= Wero =

European mobile payment service

- Website type: Mobile payment
- Headquarters: Rue de Ligne 13, 1000 Brussels, Belgium
- Area served: All of Western Europe (except Switzerland)
- Owner: EPI Company SE
- Website: wero-wallet.eu
- Launched: 2024; 2 years ago
- Native clients on: iOS; Android

Wero is a European digital wallet and instant account-to-account payment service developed by the European Payments Initiative (EPI). It was launched in Germany on 2 July 2024, followed by France and Belgium later that year. Wero is currently available in Belgium, France, Germany, Luxembourg, and the Netherlands. Leading Austrian banks are planning to introduce the service.

It was introduced as a successor to several national payment services, including Giropay in Germany, Paylib in France, Payconiq in Belgium and Luxembourg, and iDEAL in the Netherlands.

The service initially focused on person-to-person transfers, and from November 2025 expanded to e-commerce payments. In-store payments started in September 2026 through the complete switch of the established Payconiq payment network to Wero in Luxembourg.

Wero is a European alternative to established international (US-based) payment services and card networks such as PayPal, Visa and Mastercard, and as such it is often viewed as part of a European push for "payments sovereignty", i.e. a payment system that is "European" from a strategic and data-protection perspective.

The name is a portmanteau of the English personal pronoun we and the name of the European Union's common currency, the euro, but is also based on the Italian word vero, meaning 'true'.

== History ==
=== Background ===
The European Payments Initiative (EPI) was launched in July 2020 by 16 European banks to develop a unified pan-European payment solution. The initiative was intended to reduce fragmentation in European retail payments and strengthen the role of European payment providers in a market dominated in areas such as card and online payments by American companies including Visa, Mastercard and PayPal.

EPI's original plans included a payment card and a digital wallet covering in-store, online and person-to-person payments. The system was to use SEPA Instant Credit Transfer for instant payments.

In 2022, after 20 participating banks from Germany, Finland, Poland and Spain withdrew from the project, the remaining 13 shareholders abandoned plans for a separate card network and refocused EPI on a digital wallet and instant account-to-account payments.

=== 2023 ===
On 25 April 2023, EPI announced that its shareholders confirmed the development (and launch) of the wallet-based payment solution. Several European institutions, among them European Central Bank, welcomed the initiative. On 21 September 2023, EPI selected the name Wero for its upcoming payment service. In December 2023, EPI launched a pilot operation between the German Sparkasse Elbe-Elster and the French Banque Populaire, based on the fully-developed SCT-Inst SEPA payment solution.

=== 2024 ===
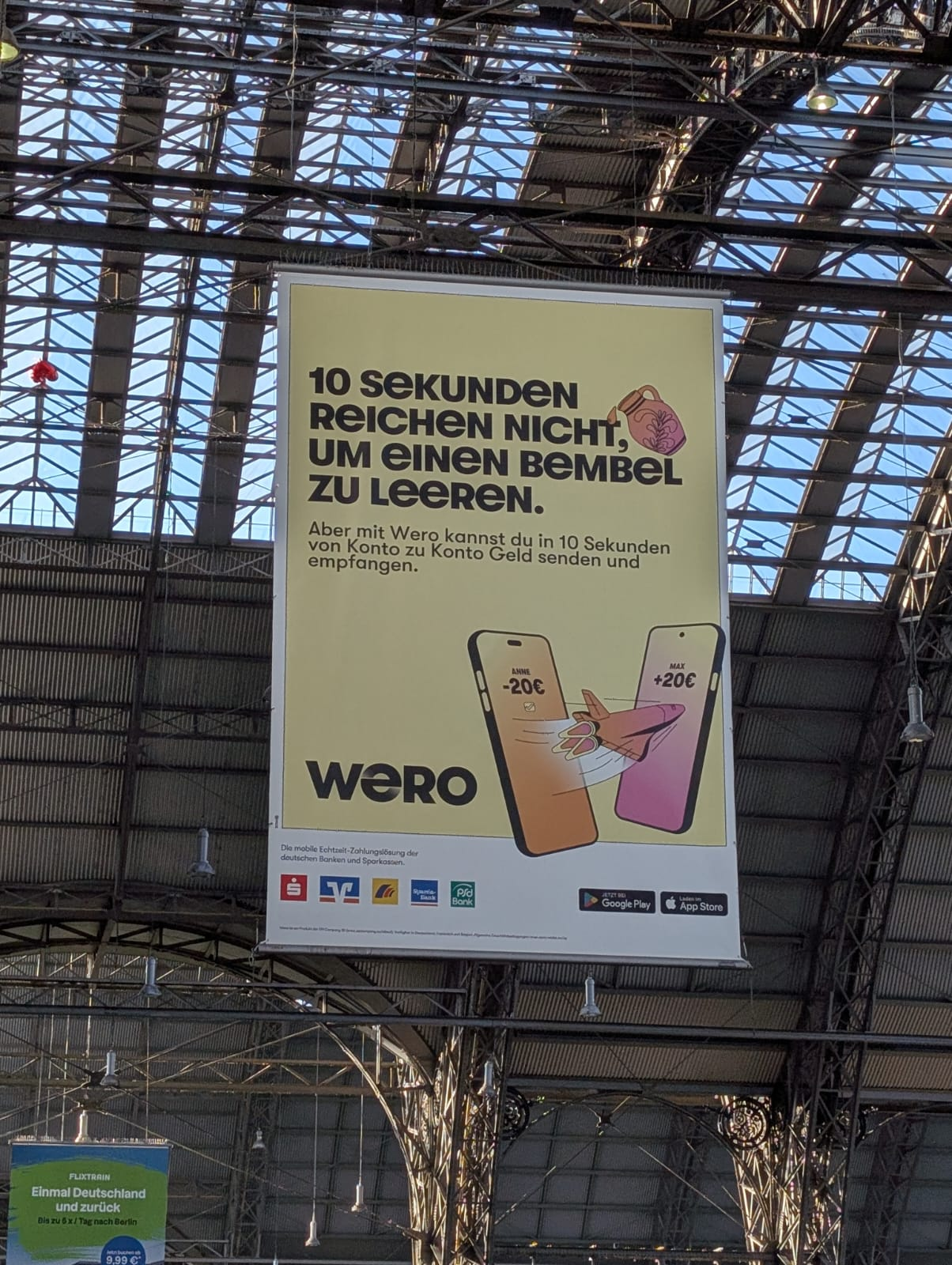
Advertisement board in Frankfurt (Main) Hauptbahnhof promoting Wero and logos of supported banks

On 2 July 2024, Wero was launched in Germany, with two German banks going live with the service. On 30 September 2024, Wero was launched in France. On 19 November 2024, Wero was launched in Belgium. As of November 2024, the service counted 14 million users and 8 million transactions had been made.

In December 2024, a first Wero e-commerce payment transaction was performed in a pilot setting. The next countries to launch Wero were slated to be, and would eventually be, Luxembourg and the Netherlands.

=== 2025 ===
During 2025, EPI expanded Wero's merchant infrastructure and banking network. Payment service providers including Nexi, Nuvei and Worldline announced integrations to enable merchants to accept Wero for online payments, while Unzer announced support for Wero through its payment platform.

In June, Revolut joined EPI to provide Wero to customers in selected European countries, and five Luxembourg banks (Banque Internationale à Luxembourg, Banque Raiffeisen, Post Luxembourg, BGL BNP Paribas and Spuerkeess) joined EPI ahead of Wero's rollout in the country. In the same month, five Belgian banks (Argenta, Bank van Breda, Beobank, Crelan and vdk bank) joined the initiative to expand availability there.

In September, EPI and the European Payments Alliance (EuroPA) announced plans to improve interoperability between European payment systems through a common technical hub. In November, CTS Eventim became the first major German online retailer to accept Wero.

=== 2026 ===
The HVV transport association’s ticket machine with WERO payment processing at the InnoTrans 2026

In January 2026, the transition from iDEAL to Wero began in the Netherlands with co-branding. In February, EPI and the operators of several other European payment systems agreed to develop interoperability for cross-border payments, while Commerzbank announced that it would join the service.

Wero expanded its e-commerce service to Belgium in March and France in April. In March, Reuters reported that it had reached 52.5 million users, while noting that it still represented only a small share of the European payments market.

In June, Erste Bank Österreich and Raiffeisen banking groups joined EPI in preparation for Wero's expansion to Austria. In July, Dutch banks and payment providers agreed on the next phase of the iDEAL migration. On 26 October, Dutch issuing banks launched online commercial payments via Wero, thereby enabling deployment of Wero for Dutch merchants, with the transition from iDEAL to Wero targeted for completion by the end of 2027.

In August, N26 launched Wero for customers in Germany and France. Wero launched in Luxembourg on 1 September (the launch was postponed from the summer). The predecessor payment service to Wero in Luxembourg, Payconiq, was discontinued on 30 September.

== Product features ==
=== Person-to-person payments ===
Wero initially focused on person-to-person payments. Users can send and request money using identifiers such as mobile phone numbers or email addresses instead of an IBAN. Payments can also be initiated through QR codes.

=== Business payments ===
Wero supports payments for businesses and self-employed users through Wero PRO. Business users can send payment requests with additional information, such as invoices and accounting references, while business accounts are identified separately from personal accounts.

=== Online payments ===
From late 2025, Wero expanded to e-commerce payments. Customers can select Wero as a payment method at checkout and authorise payments through the Wero app or a participating banking application. On desktop devices, this can involve scanning (with a mobile phone) a QR code displayed by the merchant, while mobile users can be redirected directly to payment approval.

Wero also supports token-based customer identification for merchants, allowing simplified repeat purchases without relying on browser cookies.

=== In-store payments ===
Wero supports payments at physical points of sale through QR codes. In-store QR-code payments started in September 2026 through the complete switch of the established Payconiq payment network to Wero in Luxembourg. In other countries, notably France and Germany, in-store payments are planned for 2027. In 2027, Wero also plans to provide NFC-based and other contactless payment methods.

== Current supporting banks ==
Countries and banks where Wero is being supported
Country	Bank	Start of support
Belgium	Argenta	1 January 2026
Belgium	Bank Van Breda	1 January 2026
Belgium	Belfius	26 September 2024
Belgium	Beobank	1 January 2026
Belgium	BNP Paribas Fortis (Fintro, Hello Bank! Belgium)	6 November 2024
Belgium	Crelan	1 January 2026
Belgium	ING Belgium	19 November 2024
Belgium	KBC (CBC, KBC Brussels)	26 July 2024
Belgium	Revolut	1 July 2025
Belgium	vdk bank	1 January 2026
France	BNP Paribas	24 October 2024
France	BoursoBank	TBA
France	CIC	1 November 2024
France	Crédit Agricole	26 September 2024
France	Crédit Lyonnais	14 February 2025
France	Crédit Mutuel	6 November 2024
France	BPCE Group (Groupe Caisse d'Épargne, Groupe Banque Populaire)	2 October 2024
France	Fortuneo	22 October 2025
France	Hello bank!	2 October 2024
France	La Banque Postale	28 October 2024
France	N26	11 August 2026
France	Revolut	1 July 2025
France	Société Générale	24 October 2024
Germany	BBBank	30 September 2024
Germany	Comdirect	TBA
Germany	Commerzbank	TBA
Germany	Consorsbank	December 2026
Germany	Deutsche Bank	15 December 2025
Germany	GLS Bank	16 July 2025
Germany	ING	21 August 2025
Germany	N26	11 August 2026
Germany	Postbank	31 October 2024
Germany	PSD Bank	30 September 2024
Germany	Revolut	1 July 2025
Germany	Sparkassen-Finanzgruppe	2 July 2024
Germany	Targobank	2027
Germany	Volksbanken Raiffeisenbanken (DZ Bank, Sparda-Bank)	2 July 2024
Luxembourg	Banque Internationale à Luxembourg	1 September 2026
Luxembourg	Banque Raiffeisen	1 September 2026
Luxembourg	Post Luxembourg	1 September 2026
Luxembourg	BGL BNP Paribas	1 September 2026
Luxembourg	Spuerkeess	1 September 2026

== See also ==
- Instant payment
