= PIN (debit card) =

Former Netherlands debit card brand

- Product type: Debit card
- Current owner: BeaNet (1990–1994); Interpay (1994–2005); Currence (2005–2012)
- Country: Netherlands
- Introduced: 1988 (as BeaNet); 1990 (as PIN)
- Discontinued: 2012
- Related brands: Maestro; V Pay
- Website: pin.nl

PIN was a debit card brand in the Netherlands from 1990 until 2012, owned by Currence. PIN was a magnetic stripe card, which never migrated to the EMV chip. It was therefore discontinued in 2012, after the switch-over from magnetic stripe authentication to EMV chip authentication in the Netherlands was completed. PIN was replaced by Maestro and V Pay debit cards, but as most PIN cards were already co-branded with Maestro long before 2012, consumers noticed little of the change.

Like in many neighbouring countries, the PIN debit card often doubled as a cheque guarantee card for Eurocheque until those cheques were abolished on 1 January 2002. In contrast to its neighbouring countries (e.g. Belgium's Bancontact and Germany's Girocard), the Netherlands has not operated a national debit card network since 2012.

== History ==
In 1987, the Dutch Central Bank investigated the possibility of merging the individual debit card schemes of the various banks in the Netherlands into a single system. This led in 1988 to the foundation of BeaNet, which provided a single network for all electronic payments and cash withdrawals in the Netherlands. Beginning in May 1990, merchants were provided with payment terminals linked to BeaNet, and in the autumn of 1990, BeaNet launched the PIN brand as the singular brand name for electronic payments in the Netherlands.

In 1994, BeaNet merged with Eurocard Netherlands and Bankgirocentrale into Interpay, which later became Equens. Because of increasingly stringent laws and regulations in the areas of competition and transparency, Interpay decided in 2004 to move all its payment systems into a separate company called Currence. Currence took over PIN in May 2005.

In the early 2000s, Currence aligned PIN with the regulations of the SEPA Cards Framework (SCF). A few years later, Currence decided not to move PIN to the EMV chip. As a consequence, PIN disappeared as a product on 1 January 2012, when the infrastructure for magnetic stripe cards was shut down in the Netherlands.

== In popular culture ==
After a successful advertisement campaign in late 1990, PIN quickly became synonymous with debit card payments in the Netherlands. Already in 1992, Van Dale added the verb pinnen, meaning "to pay by card", to its dictionary. Other successful campaigns included the card security-oriented campaign Jullie mogen alles van me weten, behalve mijn pincode with Dutch singer Rob de Nijs and the campaign Klein bedrag, pinnen mag ("Small amount, PIN allowed"), after the demise of Chipknip.
