= Chipknip =

Defunct Dutch stored-value payment card

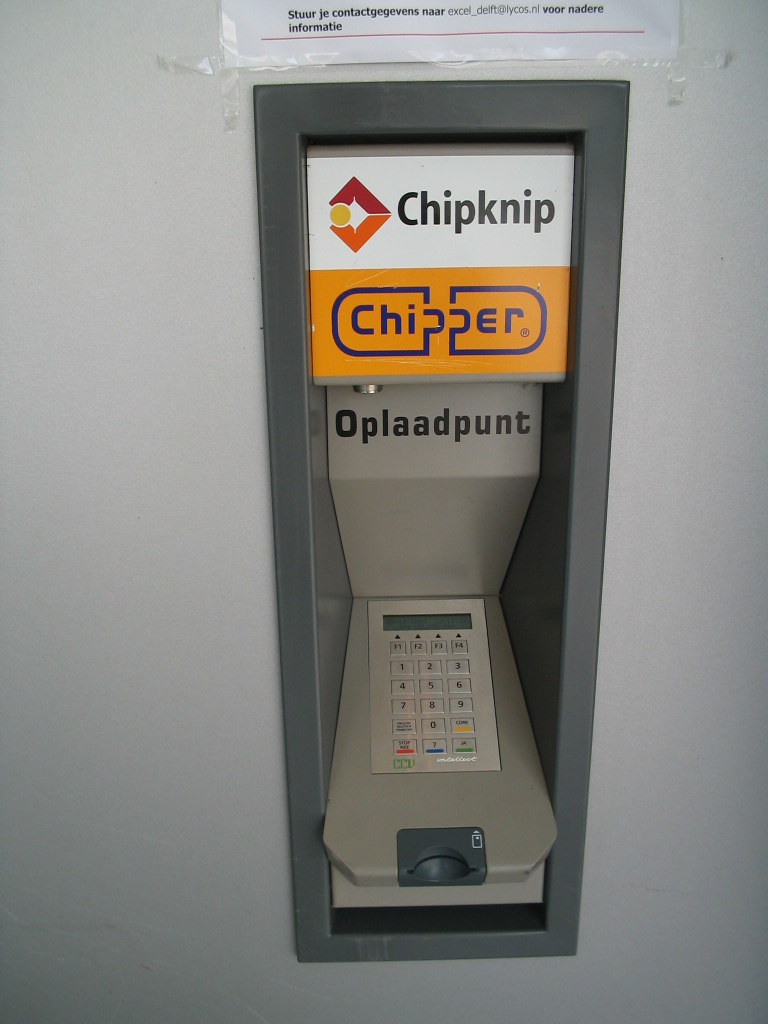
- "Oplaadpunt" (English: Top up point) for the Chipknip and Chipper where money could be deposited onto the card or withdrawn back to the bank account. Chipper was initially an incompatible alternative, but became a differently branded Chipknip after 2001.
- Location: The Netherlands
- Launched: 26 October 1995
- Discontinued: 1 January 2015
- Operator: Interpay (October 1995 – May 2005); Currence and their licensees (May 2005 – December 2014)
- Currency: Guilder, replaced by the Euro in 2001 (500 of both currencies maximum load)
- Website: chipknip.nl at the Wayback Machine (archived 16 February 2012)

Chipknip (a portmanteau of chip card and knip, Dutch for purse) was a stored-value payment card system used in the Netherlands. The Chipknip was primarily used for small retail transactions, as the card could contain a maximum value of 500 euros. The money needed to be transferred from a card holders main bank account using a loading station which were generally located next to ATMs.

Based on the Belgian Proton system, it was started by Interpay on 26 October 1995, as a pilot project in the city of Arnhem and a year later rolled out countrywide. In 1996, The Postbank left the Chipknip project and started the Chipper project with other organisations such as PTT Telecom to compete with the Chipknip until 2001, when it merged into the Chipknip system. Chipknip was taken over by Currence due to a restructuring on 17 May 2005, who managed it with their licensees until its discontinuation on 1 January 2015. Its peak was in 2010, when a total of 178 million transactions were made. Since its discontinuation, contactless payments without pin code for small transactions using Maestro or V Pay have largely become the norm.

== Background ==
In the early years of the PIN system, consumers were advised to pay small amounts with cash money and big amounts with PIN. Later, the cash was replaced by the Chipknip.

=== Proton ===
The Proton system was designed by Banksys in 1994. It was licensed to banks in Switzerland, The Netherlands, Brazil, Australia, Sweden and Canada for their programs but used a different name for each of them. American Express got a worldwide license. Banksys invested around 1 billion francs in the development of Proton, which had paid off. Interpay avoided a significant investment by licensing the Proton system developed by Banksys. The Proton architecture is largely inspired by EN 1546, but the Proton protocol is proprietary.

=== Legal ===
Various mergers and a split-off have taken place in the Dutch payment industry

BeaNet was founded in December 1988. On 1 July 1993, a merger between Bankgirocentrale, BeaNet and Eurocard Nederland was announced, which formed Interpay B.V. in 1994.

Chipknip B.V. is a daughter company of the Currence Holding B.V. company

Every payment product of Currence is put in a separate besloten vennootschap company. They are all owners of the trademarks, copyrights and other properties. These companies are contract parties with license and certification holders and are responsible for providing a licenses to other companies.

== Characteristics ==
The Chipknip was a debit card that did not require a pin code for payments. For depositing money onto the card, it did require a pin code. A maximum of 500 guilders or euros could be deposited onto the card.

A Chipknip transaction takes around two to three seconds.

In Phase I, the card manufacturer was CP8 Transac, a division of Groupe Bull. In June 1996, the choice for the CC1000 chips by Bull Benelux was made. In Phase II, the national roll-out starting in 1996, the card was manufactured by CP8 Oberthur Technologies and Philips. From Phase III and onwards it was developed by CP8 Oberthur Technologies and De La Rue Card Technology. It was based on the Belgian system named Proton. It was compatible with multiple suppliers of readers and terminals: CCV Group, Certec, DateInet, Getronics, ICL, NCR, QE and Taxameter. In Phase I and II, it used the ST16601 chip by SGS-Thomson which had 1 kilobyte EEPROM. In Phase III, it used the ST16F48 by the same company which had an 8 kilobyte EEPROM. The ST16 series is based on the Motorola 6805. The ST16F48 uses an 8-bit micro-architecture and has serial access which is compatible with ISO 7816. The CMOS-based semiconductor is manufactured using the 1 micrometer process. The development for the chip is done using the ST16XYZ-EMU development system. The Chipknip network was based on the X.25 protocol. It made use of the Data Encryption Standard and the Triple DES with RSA using a secure access module. In 2011, Currence published about the rise of skimming with the Chipknip. Skimmers modified the device in such a way that information from the card could be read. Countermeasures were taken, such as front pieces in the ATM. In July of that year, Currence stated that the skimming was reduced to zero.

The Chipper chip was manufactured by IBM and Schlumberger (of which the smart card spin-off Axalto later merged with Gemalto). It used the STM 16SF48 with 16KB of ROM, 1088 bytes RAM and 8KB of EEPROM. It used Triple DES for security.

== History ==
Chipknip loading transactions View source data.
Chipknip loading amount View source data.
Chipknip payment transactions View source data.
Chipknip payment amount View source data.

=== 1995–1996: Pilot in Arnhem ===
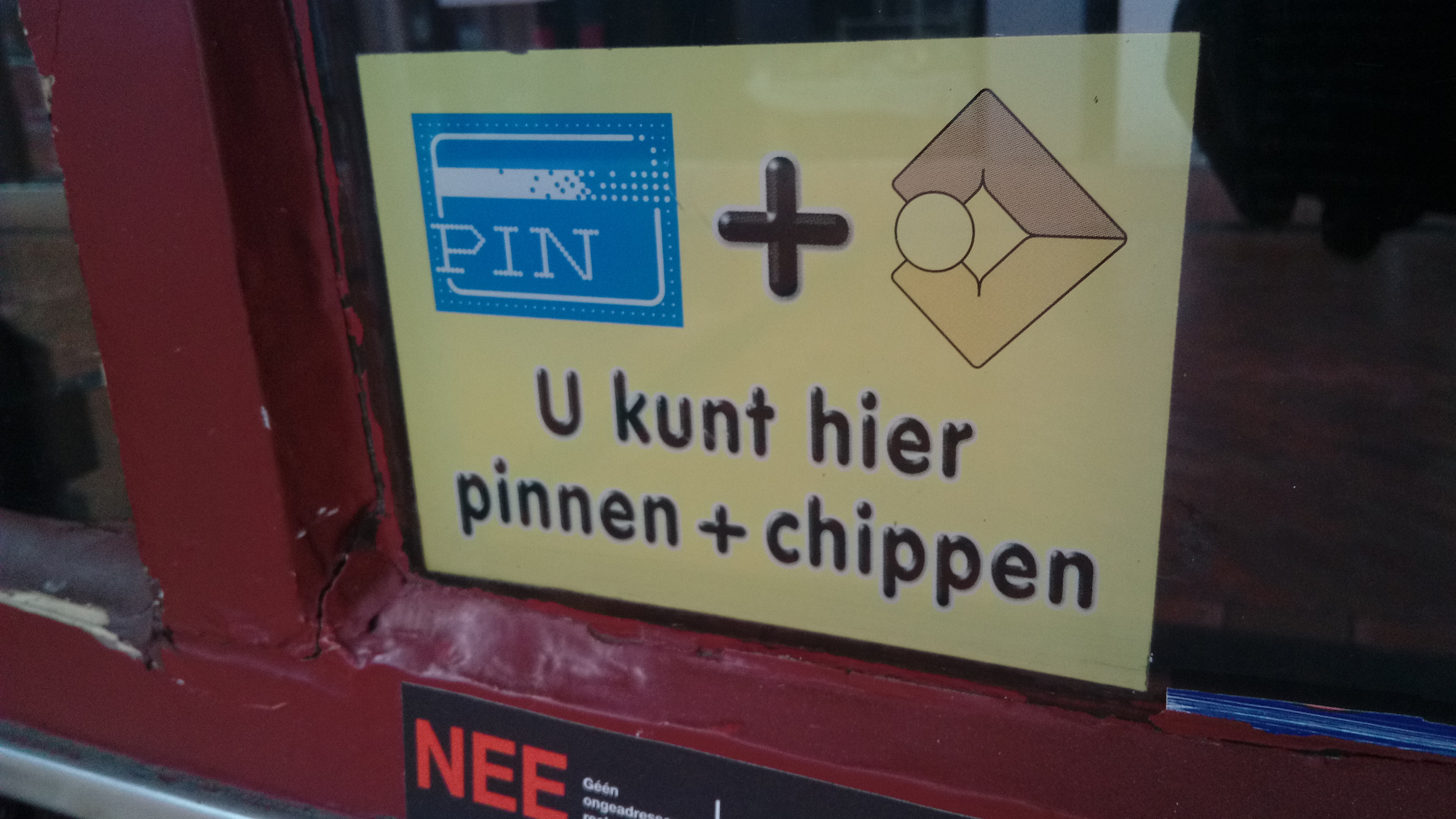
Sign outside of a merchant, stating "U kunt hier pinnen + chippen", loosely translated as "You can use pin and chip here"

The Chipknip started as a pilot project by Interpay in the city of Arnhem on 26 October 1995.

Wim Duisenberg, then president of De Nederlandsche Bank which is the central bank of The Netherlands called the Chipknip a "more or less revolutionary development". The city of Arnhem was chosen because it was most representative of The Netherlands as a whole in market research. Professor George Hendrikse and Henk de Vries noted that the representativeness may be questioned because the Postbank was a major employer in Arnhem, which might have favored adoption.

The payment limit was set at 35 Guilders.

M. Roos, the director of the Centraal Bureau Levensmiddelenhandel said in NRC Handelsblad that the Chipknip was already outdated at its introduction and should not be used. Companies that were part of Vendex or Ahold did not join the pilot. Interpay director Stolwijk was surprised by this since they changed their opinion in a few days.

=== 1996–2007: Countrywide usage ===
As of January 2000, there were 12.500.000 cards in circulation.

Intellect CEO Graeme Inchley said in August 1996 that 2500 devices were ordered at their company for initial deployment.

Banks advised using the Chipknip for payments up to 35 Guilders and PIN for payments up to 100 Guilders.

In March 1996, Rabobank released their Smartfone to deposit money on the Chipknip from home, which cost 300 Guilders. In October 1996, Rabobank announced that they planned to make their Chipknip usable for internet payments. They ordered a million Chipknip readers from the company Datelnet from 's-Hertogenbosch and planned to release it in the first months of 1997. Using the so-called Chipknipper the balance could be read, the card could be locked and money could be deposited using a phone line. Once the card was locked, it could only be unlocked at a loading station.

The countrywide deployment started at the end of the summer of 1996, a year earlier than originally planned.

NRC Handelsblad noted in November 1996 that The Netherlands was an early adopter of electronic payments and that it was mainly beneficial for the banks themselves. The Royal Dutch Mint criticized the Chipknip for the aggressive marketing, forcing large transaction fees upon small and medium enterprises.

As of 1997, over 30.000 VeriFone Smart Card systems have been installed by the Rabobank for the Chipknip.

The Dutch Advertising Standards Authority stated in 1997 that the Rabobank falsely claimed in commercials that the Chipknip already had millions users.

As of January 2000, there were 12.500.000 cards in circulation.

Rabobank marketed the Chipknip from 2001 at residents councils of retirement homes. A few years later, 350 retirement homes had implemented the Chipknip, also because Rabobank delivered a working ATM.

In 2003, then leaving director of Interpay Willem Stolwijk said that the usage of Chipknip lags behind the expectations.

In 2003, a lawsuit was filed against the municipality of Nijmegen who only allowed Chipknip payments at their parking meters. The verdict was ruled in favor of the lawyer who sued the municipality. German car-using customers avoided Nijmegen because they were unable to pay with anything except the Dutch Chipknip. A prepaid Chipcard was introduced by InterEGI (Interpay Elektronisch Geldinstelling B.V.) for foreigners who did not have a Dutch bank account.

In 2004, Rabobank introduced voice controlled Chipknip deposit devices in retirement homes.

On 4 March 2004, Interpay founded the spun off named Brands & Licences Betalingsverkeer Nederland, which would handle payment products so that Interpay could focus on transaction processing. On 17 May 2005, Currence was founded as a split-off from Interpay, who took over the Chipknip brand.

As of 2006, there were 200.000 places where the Chipknip could be used, but this number also included locations where the Chipknip was deliberately made unusable by the merchant.

Chris Hensen from NRC Handelsblad considered the Chipknip "the Lada of the payment systems".

In 2006, Ilja Bruggeman from Platform Detailhandel Nederland said that merchants were not to blame for the low adoption of the Chipknip, because for them it would have been efficient, safe and cheap to implement. He described the consumers as unwilling to make use of the system, and because they were unwilling, merchants did not adopt the system more widely, creating a vicious cycle.

In 2007, migration to an EMV chip was started, which made the chip compatible with both Chipknip and PIN.

Most Dutch banks added the Chipknip chip to their standard payment cards, but the Postbank used separate cards for Chipknip and PIN. According to a spokesperson, this made it easier for people to lend their Chipknip card to other people due to the low risk.

The Chipknip was mostly used in places where it is the only usable payment method, such as parking meters, vending machines or company cantines.

"You are investing in something that is disappearing. It is hard to use, you keep having to deposit money onto the card and cannot easily check the current balance. The Chipknip was pushed through because it was easy and cheap for merchants, it did not start from a wish by the customer."

— Steef Peters, professor Information Systems at the Vrije Universiteit Amsterdam, 2007

==== 1996–2001: Chipper ====
Logo of Chipper, the competitor of Chipknip between 1996 and 2001

On 20 April 1996, the Postbank formally left the Chipknip project. Sister company ING formally stayed in the Chipknip project, which was controversial.

Chipper was founded by Postbank and ING Bank together with KPN Telecom.

ING executive Marinus Minderhout worked on the development of the Chipper card while he was a commissioner at Interpay at the same time.

In 1998, Postbank introduced the ThuisChipper (English: HomeChipper) to deposit money from home to the Chipper card. After discontinuing the Chipper in 2001, Postbank investigated if the ThuisChipper could be made compatible with the Chipknip, which was not the case. According to the Consumentenbond, consumers could get their money back.

It was promoted with the slogan "De toekomst heeft een Chipper op zak" (English: "The future has a Chipper in its pocket").

In 1997, it was already clear that the Chipper had failed. In Zeeland, an experiment with the Zeelandkaart was conducted, but in the rest of the country the Chipknip was widely used.

In 2001, the Postbank discontinued the Chipper.

=== 2007–2014: Discontinuation ===
Due to the decreased costs of telecommunications for PIN transactions, Currence encouraged the use even for the small transactions that would previously have been done with Chipknip using the slogan "Klein bedrag? Pinnen mag" (English: Small amount? Pin allowed)

In August 2007, the Nederlandse Vereniging van Banken announced that they have stopped promoting the Chipknip. In September 2007, Currence announced that they would be repositioning the Chipknip system to the parvenca market segment (portmanteau of parking, vending and catering).

In December 2007, Mastercard announced that they planned to release a successor to the Chipknip on the Dutch market, called the Paypass, which was later rebranded to Mastercard Contactless.

Currence was the owner of the PIN brand. They expected that with their marketing campaign het nieuwe pinnen (English: the new pinning) that merchants would drop support for the Chipknip.

In January 2011, Currence predicted that the usage of Chipknip would decrease, because merchants have to sign new contracts with their banks for EMV compatibility and chipknip is not bundled in the same contract anymore. Currence decided to discontinue the Chipknip service in March 2013.

As of March 2013, Chipknip was responsible for 2% of the retail transactions. The costs to keep Chipknip operating would increase because it has to abide by European harmonisation regarding the Single Euro Payments Area. In April 2013, retail stopped accepting the Chipknip. The benefit of this is that customers no longer have to make a choice between Chipknip or Maestro and V Pay on the payment terminal.

In November 2014, it was estimated that all 12 million Chipknip owners collectively had 70 to 80 million Euros stored on their cards. First, ING, ABN AMRO and Rabobank decided to withdraw money from the cards, and later Currence decided together with all other banks to do the same. Customers of ABN AMRO had 14 million euros of debit on the cards Rabobank customers had 27 million euros of money deposited on their Chipknip cards, 7 euros on average.

Algemeen Dagblad noted that "only elderly people will mourn at the discontinuation of Chipknip", because it was still relatively commonly used in retirement homes.

The company Magna Carta Chipcard Solutions published a Chipknip transaction log that occurred on 31 December 2014, at 23:59 and stated that this was "with virtual certainty the last Chipknip transaction made before the end date that was specified by Currence".

Currence cited the decreasing usage as the reason for discontinuing it, but in reality the system was never used that much.

According to Jan van der Kolk from the company Automaten Centrale, not all vending machines have been replaced in time, which caused problems if the machines did not also accept cash. Because there was not yet a good digital replacement, devices that were made compatible with the Chipknip earlier were made compatible with cash money again although consumers had a preference for digital money. When Leiden University discontinued the Chipknip, they made coffee vending machine consumptions free until a replacement was deployed.

== See also ==
- FeliCa
- Octopus card
- Visa Cash
- Mondex
