= Banksys =

Defunct Belgian payment processor

- Merged into: Worldline SA
- Location: Belgium
- Website: banksys.be at the Wayback Machine (archived 2006-10-29)

Banksys N.V. (or Banksys SA) was a Belgian payment processor owned by Belgian banks.

It was formed in 1989 through the merge of ATM/POS networks of Bancontact and Mister cash. It also developed the Proton system, which was later spun-off into Proton World International.

The Belgian antitrust authority noted that Banksys was too dominant in the market for payment services. The Union of Self-Employed Entrepreneurs noted in 2003 that this issue has not been fixed. Banksys was merged with Atos Worldline at the end of 2006, together with the Bank Card Company.

== See also ==
- Interpay
- EquensWorldline
