= Consumer-to-business =

Business model

Consumer-to-business (C2B) is a business model in which consumers (individuals) create value and businesses consume that value. For example, when a consumer writes reviews or when a consumer gives a useful idea for new product development then that consumer is creating value for the business if the business adopts the input. In the C2B model, a reverse auction or demand collection model, enables buyers to name or demand their own price, which is often binding, for a specific good or service. Inside of a consumer to business market the roles involved in the transaction must be established and the consumer must offer something of value to the business.

Cross-border consumer-to-business (C2B) payments are transactions where an individual in one country pays a business in another country. These payments underpin global digital commerce by enabling consumers to purchase goods and services from international merchants. In emerging markets, support for local payment methods (LPMs) – such as domestic e-wallets, local card networks, bank transfers, and mobile money – is crucial. Many consumers in these regions do not have international credit cards or prefer familiar local payment options. As of 2024, over half of transactions in emerging economies are still cash-based and about 60% use payment methods other than credit cards.

Another form of C2B is the electronic commerce business model in which consumers can offer products and services to companies, and the companies pay the consumers. This business model is a complete reversal of the traditional business model in which companies offer goods and services to consumers (business-to-consumer = B2C). We can see the C2B model at work in blogs or internet forums in which the author offers a link back to an online business thereby facilitating the purchase of a product (like a book on Amazon.com), for which the author might receive affiliate revenues from a successful sale. Elance was the first C2B model e-commerce site. This makes LPM integration vital for reaching customers and facilitating financial inclusion in digital commerce.

Local payment methods provide a trusted and convenient way for consumers to pay online, often through mobile wallets, instant bank payments, or voucher systems. By offering LPMs at checkout, international businesses can improve user experience and conversion rates. Analysts note that tailoring to local preferences is essential – if global merchants fail to offer the payment options popular in a given country, they risk losing an entire segment of customers. Thus, cross-border C2B payment providers specialize in bridging global merchants to these local systems, ensuring consumers can pay in their preferred way while merchants receive funds seamlessly across borders.

== Overview ==
C2B is a kind of economic relationship that is qualified as an inverted business type. The advent of the C2B scheme is due to:

- The internet connecting large groups of people to a bidirectional network; the large traditional media outlets are one-directional relationships whereas the internet is bidirectional.
- Decreasing costs of technology; individuals now have access to technologies that were once only available to large companies (digital printing and acquisition technology, high-performance computers, and powerful software).

== Positives and negatives ==
Nowadays people have smartphones or connect to the internet through personal tablets/computers daily allowing consumers to engage with brands online. According to Katherine Arline, in traditional consumer-to-business models companies would promote goods and services to consumers, but a shift has occurred to allow consumers to be the driving force behind a transaction. To the consumers benefit, reverse auctions occur in consumer to business markets allowing the consumer to name their price for a product or service. A consumer can also provide value to a business by offering to promote a business products on a consumers blog or social media platforms. Businesses are provided value through their consumers and vice versa. Businesses gain in C2B from the consumers willingness to negotiate price, contribute data, or market to the company. Consumers profit from direct payment of the reduced-price goods and services and the flexibility of the transaction the C2B market created. Consumer to business markets have their downfall as well. C2B is still a relatively new business practice and has not been fully studied.

One weakness of the consumer-business model is that consumer information and privacy could be compromised. For example, businesses might choose to secretly analyze consumer spending by using sensitive information such as purchase history, age, race, location, etc.

== Distinguishing between traditional business models ==
Consumer to business is an up and coming business market that can be utilized as a company's entire business model or added to an already existing model. Consumer to business (C2B) is the opposite of business to consumer (B2C) practices and is facilitated by the internet or online forms of technology. Another important distinction between the traditional business to consumer market is that the consumer chooses to be a part of the business relationship inside a consumer to business market. For a relationship to exist though both parties must acknowledge that it exists, implying that the relationship is important to both participants.

Data analytics plays a role in customer-to-business (C2B) interactions by providing information about customer behavior and preferences. Businesses use such data to analyze purchasing patterns and interactions between consumers and organizations.

== Usage in technology ==
The technology industry has largely adopted the use of consumer-to-business strategies, with social media corporations taking a large part in that growth. For example, companies such as Yelp or TripAdvisor provide a C2B service due to the amount of personal data harvested for use in targeting possible advertising clients. C2B can also be theorized, in the case of review aggregators, to increase the revenue of businesses through more overall knowledge about the company at hand. For example, if a corporation receives many positive reviews on a website such as Yelp, it may help to drive traffic to the company.

=== Data aggregation ===
Aggregation of data is a common C2B practice done with many internet corporations. In this instance, the consumer is creating the value of personal information and data to better target them to the correct advertisers. Businesses such as Facebook, Twitter, and others utilize this information in an effort to facilitate their B2B transactions with advertisers. Most of these systems cannot be fully utilized without B2C or B2B transactions, as C2B is usually the facilitator of these.

== Cross-Border C2B Payments in Developed Markets ==
Cross-border consumer-to-business (C2B) payments in developed markets involve transactions where individuals in one high-income economy pay businesses in another. These markets, including North America, Western Europe, and East Asia, are characterized by mature financial systems, high card penetration, and advanced digital infrastructure. Unlike emerging markets, where local payment methods (LPMs) dominate, developed economies prioritize speed, security, and innovation. Credit/debit cards account for over 70% of online transactions in regions like the U.S. and EU, but digital wallets, account-to-account (A2A) payments, and Buy Now, Pay Later (BNPL) services are reshaping the

Despite standardization, regional preferences persist. For example, 49% of Europeans prefer bank transfers for e-commerce, while U.S. consumers lean toward digital wallets like PayPal (used by 72% of online shoppers). Real-time payment systems (e.g., SEPA Instant in Europe, FedNow in the U.S.) and open banking APIs are accelerating cross-border C2B flows by enabling instant, low-cost transactions. As of 2024, cross-border e-commerce in developed markets is projected to grow at 12% annually, driven by demand for global goods and digital services.

=== Market Landscape and Growth Trends ===
Developed markets exhibit distinct payment ecosystems shaped by regulatory frameworks, technological adoption, and consumer behavior:

North America: The U.S. and Canada are card-centric, with credit/debit cards accounting for 65% of online payments. However, digital wallets (Apple Pay, Google Pay, PayPal) now represent 30% of transactions, driven by mobile commerce and one-click checkout solutions.Automated Clearing House bank transfers remain critical for recurring payments (e.g., subscriptions), processing $18 trillion annually in the U.S. alone. Cross-border C2B payments are bolstered by platforms like PayPal and Stripe, which support multi-currency acceptance and localized checkouts. For instance, 40% of U.S. cross-border online purchases are from EU and UK merchants, facilitated by dynamic currency conversion (DCC) and fraud prevention tools.

Europe: The EU’s Payment Services Directive (PSD2) and SEPA Instant have unified cross-border payments, enabling real-time euro transfers across 36 countries. Digital wallets (38% of e-commerce) and BNPL services (e.g., Klarna, used by 150 million Europeans) are surging, particularly in Scandinavia and Germany. Local methods like iDEAL (Netherlands) and Sofort (Germany) remain popular, with iDEAL processing 1.1 billion transactions in 2023 (80% of Dutch e-commerce). Open banking adoption is rising, with A2A payments projected to grow by 29% annually, reducing reliance on card networks for cross-border transactions.

East Asia: Japan and South Korea blend traditional and digital methods. In Japan, Konbini (convenience store cash payments) still account for 15% of online transactions, but digital wallets like PayPay (55 million users) and credit cards dominate. South Korea’s KakaoPay (38 million users) and Naver Pay lead, with 62% of cross-border purchases made via mobile apps. Real-time settlement systems (Japan’s Zengin, Korea’s HOFIN) underpin instant cross-border remittances, which grew by 22% in 2023 due to regional e-commerce integration.

=== Key Players in Cross-Border C2B Payments ===
Major providers tailoring solutions for developed markets include:

- Adyen: Processes payments via 250+ methods, including SEPA Direct Debit and U.S. ACH. Its unified platform optimizes authorization rates (avg. 92%) for global merchants like eBay and Spotify.
- Klarna: The BNPL giant serves 150 million users, allowing split payments for international purchases in 45 countries.
- Stripe: Supports 135+ currencies and localized checkouts with embedded fraud detection. Stripe’s partnership with Klarna and Apple Pay enables BNPL and wallet-based cross-border payments, capturing 25% of EU C2B transactions.
- PayPal: Facilitates cross-border purchases for 426 million active accounts, offering currency conversion at point-of-sale and Honey discounts to drive conversions.

=== Role of Regional Payment Preferences in C2B Transactions Case Studies ===
Germany: Sofort and Giropay

Bank-based methods dominate German e-commerce. Sofort (now part of Klarna) allows real-time bank transfers using online banking credentials, processing 40% of cross-border purchases from German consumers. Similarly, Giropay connects 1,500 German banks, enabling direct account debits for international merchants like Zalando.

Sweden: Swish

Sweden’s mobile payment app Swish, used by 8 million users (80% population), integrates with cross-border platforms via Tink’s APIs. For example, a Swedish buyer can pay a U.S. merchant via Swish, with funds routed through Tink’s open banking network.

Japan: Konbini Payments

Global merchants like Amazon Japan accept Konbini cash payments via platforms like PayPay and 7-Eleven. Customers receive a barcode to pay in-store, bridging cash preferences with digital commerce.

== Cross-Border C2B Payments in Emerging Markets ==
=== Market Landscape and Growth Trends ===
Emerging markets in the Caucasus & CIS, Southeast Asia, and Latin America have seen rapid growth in digital payments, driven by increasing internet access, e-commerce adoption, and fintech innovation. However, each region has a distinct payment landscape with different preferred methods:

Caucasus & CIS: In Eastern Europe and the CIS, payment habits vary widely by country. On average about one-third of online transactions are paid by credit or debit card, but this hides local disparities. For example, in Kazakhstan roughly 60% of e-commerce purchases were paid in cash (only ~20% by card), whereas in Latvia nearly 49% used cards (and just 12.5% cash). This fragmentation means alternative payment methods (like e-wallets or bank transfers) and cash-on-delivery remain important in the CIS. Cross-border e-commerce is growing: over 20% of online sales in the region are from foreign websites in some markets. Payment providers serving this region focus on integrating local cards, bank transfer systems, and cash payment options to enable these cross-border sales.

Southeast Asia: Southeast Asia’s booming e-commerce sector has been accompanied by a shift to mobile and digital payments. Digital wallets are extremely popular – across Asia-Pacific, wallets now account for roughly 60% of online purchase volume. Each country tends to have its own dominant wallets and real-time bank payment apps. For instance, China’s WeChat Pay (with about 900 million users) and Southeast Asia’s GrabPay (180 million users) exemplify the scale of local wallets that global merchants must accommodate. Open banking and instant account-to-account (A2A) transfers are also on the rise, allowing real-time bank payments at checkout. Governments have played a role: in Indonesia, standardized QR code infrastructure (QRIS) has made wallets and bank apps interoperable nationally, and ASEAN countries are linking their QR payment systems cross-border. By 2023, central banks in five ASEAN nations (Indonesia, Thailand, Malaysia, Singapore, Philippines) connected their real-time payment networks, enabling users to scan each other’s QR codes for cross-border transactions without needing currency conversion through USD. These developments point to strong growth in regional C2B payment volumes. E-commerce in Southeast Asia continues to expand, and with it the use of instant bank payments and e-wallets for both domestic and cross-border purchases

Latin America: Latin America is experiencing a digital payments surge alongside e-commerce growth. Alternative payment methods now rival cards in many markets. Instant bank transfer systems are especially influential – for example, Brazil’s Pix (launched in 2020 by the Central Bank of Brazil) is used by about 75% of Brazilian adults and has even higher user penetration than credit cards. Pix quickly grew to handle around 40% of Brazil’s online transaction volume, and Brazil’s e-commerce has one of the world’s highest shares of real-time payments. In Colombia, the bank transfer network PSE overtook credit cards as the most used online payment method in 2021. Digital wallets are also rising across the region; in Argentina, for example, e-wallets have become the top payment method for online commerce. An analysis of Latin America predicted that by 2022 around 40% of the region’s e-commerce value would be paid via alternative methods (real-time transfers, wallets, cash vouchers, etc.) as consumers increasingly favor these over traditional cards. Overall transaction volumes are growing rapidly: Latin America’s digital payments revenue is projected to triple to about $300 billion by 2027. E-commerce sales in the region are expected to exceed $260 billion by 2028, accelerating the shift from cash to digital wallets, account transfers, and other alternatives. While Latin America still accounts for under 10% of global digital payment volume, its growth rate now outpaces more mature markets. This trajectory suggests that cross-border C2B payments will become ever more commonplace, with merchants needing to support methods like Pix, OXXO (Mexico’s cash voucher system), local credit schemes, and mobile money to reach Latin American consumers.

=== Key Players in Cross-Border C2B Payments ===
Several payment providers specialize in helping global businesses accept consumer payments across borders in these emerging markets. These companies focus on integrating myriad local payment methods into a single platform for merchants, ensuring funds can be collected locally and remitted internationally. Major players include:

- dLocal: dLocal is a Uruguay-founded fintech platform that focuses on emerging markets payments. It enables global merchants to accept local payment methods and send payouts in regions including Latin America, Asia, the Middle East, and Africa. Through a “One dLocal” integration (one API and one platform), merchants can process local credit/debit cards, bank transfers, e-wallets, and cash payments without setting up local entities. dLocal connects enterprise merchants with “billions of consumers” across 40+ emerging countries. For example, it supports methods like Brazil’s Boleto and Pix, Mexico’s OXXO, India’s UPI, and others. dLocal has become a prominent provider for C2B payments in high-growth markets by handling currency conversion, local settlement, and compliance for merchants.
- Volt.io: Volt.io is a fintech specializing in real-time account-to-account payments and open banking. Founded in the UK in 2019, Volt has built a global network for instant bank payments at checkout. It enables account-to-account (A2A) C2B payments, meaning consumers can pay online directly from their bank account, authenticated through their banking app, with funds moving in real time to the merchant. Volt’s infrastructure connects domestic faster payment schemes and open banking interfaces across regions (initially Europe and Brazil, with expansion into Asia-Pacific and the Americas underway. Real-time A2A payments are growing in popularity (the total value of such payments in e-commerce is forecasted to reach $757 billion by 2026) and Volt is one of the companies enabling this shift at a cross-border scale. Its solutions illustrate the move toward open banking as a key enabler of cross-border C2B payments.
- Rapyd: Rapyd is a global fintech-as-a-service platform that offers multi-rail payment solutions, connecting businesses to a wide range of local payment methods worldwide. Through Rapyd’s API and network, merchants can accept payments in local currency via hundreds of local options (cards, bank transfers, e-wallets, cash, mobile money, etc.) and disburse payouts globally. Rapyd has built an extensive payments network across 100+ countries, supporting over 1,200 payment methods as of 2023. It also provides value-added services like fraud prevention, compliance, and currency settlement. Rapyd’s focus on emerging markets was strengthened by its 2023 acquisition of PayU’s Global Payment Organization, which expanded Rapyd’s presence in over 30 countries across Central/Eastern Europe, Latin America, Africa, and Asia.
- PPRO: PPRO (pronounced “pee-pro”) is a UK-based payment technology company that provides a payment orchestration layer for alternative payments. It partners with payment service providers, banks, and merchants to give them access to local payment methods in 80+ markets via a single integration. Major payment companies like Stripe, PayPal, and Worldpay have used PPRO’s services to accelerate their support for local methods. By doing so, PPRO functions as a behind-the-scenes enabler of cross-border C2B transactions, ensuring that when a consumer chooses a local option at checkout, the payment can be authorized and routed to the merchant efficiently. This orchestration role has become increasingly important as the number of relevant LPMs worldwide continues to grow each year.
- Paymentwall: Paymentwall is a veteran global payments platform that specializes in digital commerce and has a strong focus on localized payment options. It serves merchants in industries like software, gaming, SaaS, and travel, helping them accept payments from consumers in over 200 countries and territories. Paymentwall is particularly known for aggregating over 150 local payment methods, which has helped companies enter hard-to-reach markets such as China, Brazil, Southeast Asia, and others. Paymentwall’s platform offers a customizable payment widget/API that shows local payment options based on the user’s country. This includes not only method acceptance but also risk management and compliance in those locales. By using Paymentwall, for instance, a game developer in North America can charge users in South Korea via a local e-wallet or allow a customer in Brazil to pay with a Boleto bancário. Such capabilities illustrate how cross-border C2B providers lower barriers for digital businesses to sell internationally. Paymentwall’s longstanding presence in emerging markets’ payments has made it a notable player in this ecosystem.
- Thunes: Thunes is a Singapore-headquartered B2B cross-border payments network that enables interoperability between different countries’ payment systems, with a focus on emerging markets and mobile money. Its platform allows banks, fintechs, money transfer operators, and marketplaces to send or receive funds across borders in a seamless way. Thunes connects over 100 countries and 60+ currencies, providing real-time transfers between diverse payment rails. In summary, Thunes plays a key role in C2B payments by connecting global payment platforms with local mobile wallets and bank systems, thus simplifying cross-border disbursements and collections in emerging economies.

=== Role of Local Payment Methods (LPMs) in C2B Transactions ===
Local payment methods are the linchpin of cross-border C2B payments in emerging markets. They allow consumers to use familiar, trusted mechanisms to pay international merchants, and they enable merchants to tap into new customer bases. Several case studies illustrate how specific LPMs function within the global digital commerce ecosystem:

Uzbekistan: UzumPay and Local Cards

Uzbekistan’s digital payments market is evolving with homegrown platforms. Uzum is a leading tech company in Uzbekistan that has built a digital services ecosystem, including e-commerce and fintech offerings. It launched UzumPay, a payment service that, along with Uzum’s banking arm, issues local Visa cards for consumers . In Uzbekistan, two domestic card networks – Uzcard and Humo – dominate cashless payments. These are used for everything from ATM withdrawals to online services within the country. Global merchants entering Uzbekistan (or serving Uzbek customers) often cannot rely on international card networks alone, since many Uzbek consumers hold only local Uzcard/Humo cards or prefer local e-wallets. As a result, payment providers integrate local card processing and banking connections. For instance, companies like 8B or Paymentwall enable acceptance of Uzbek cards and mobile payment apps by international digital merchants. UzumPay itself facilitates online payments for things like utilities, mobile top-ups, and online shopping within Uzbekistan’s marketplaces. The significance of these local methods is evident: most Uzbek e-commerce platforms have integrated local payment services (historically Payme and Click, two popular Uzbek payment apps) rather than traditional banks. These apps collectively had over 20 million users, indicating widespread adoption of local fintech solutions for C2B payments. By supporting UzumPay and local card schemes, global payment providers ensure that Uzbek consumers can pay for cross-border digital services – such as international subscriptions or online courses – using funds from their domestic accounts. This case underscores how a combination of local cards and wallets in Central Asia enables cross-border commerce in a region where cash has long been king.

Philippines: GCash Digital Wallet

In the Philippines, the GCash wallet has become a primary payment method for many online consumer transactions. GCash is a mobile payments service that allows Filipinos to store money, pay bills, transfer funds, and make purchases via their phones. As of 2023, GCash reported over 81 million active users in the Philippines, making it one of the largest digital wallets in Southeast Asia. Its ubiquity means that a large portion of the population can transact digitally even if they do not have credit cards. GCash is used for e-commerce checkouts, app stores, ride-hailing, and subscriptions (for example, many Filipinos pay for video streaming or gaming services through direct GCash payments). Recognizing this, global merchants and payment gateways have integrated GCash as a payment option for the Philippines. PayPal, Alipay+, and other international payment aggregators also connect to GCash, enabling cross-border C2B payments. For instance, a Philippine consumer can pay a foreign merchant and the merchant receives funds in their currency, while the user’s GCash account is debited in pesos – the payment provider handles the currency exchange and settlement. GCash’s popularity reflects a broader trend in Southeast Asia where mobile wallets have overtaken cards for online spending. It provides features like one-click QR code pay in stores and online, and even offers installment credit, which further drives usage for larger purchases. For subscription-based digital commerce (music, cloud services, etc.), wallets like GCash often allow recurring payment arrangements or easy manual renewal, acting as the functional equivalent of a credit card for users who lack one. The success of GCash demonstrates the critical role of local e-wallets in enabling C2B digital commerce in the Philippines – any cross-border payment strategy targeting Filipino consumers must include such wallets to be effective.

Indonesia: Virtual Accounts for Online Payments

Indonesia presents a unique local payment method widely used for e-commerce: the virtual bank account. Virtual accounts (VAs) are temporary, unique bank account numbers generated by a merchant or payment gateway for each transaction. When an Indonesian consumer wants to pay an online merchant (even an overseas merchant), the website can show a virtual account number affiliated with a local Indonesian bank. The consumer then transfers money (via their bank’s app or ATM) to that account, which is automatically matched to their order. Virtual accounts have become the dominant online payment channel in Indonesia. According to one Indonesian payment provider, over 91% of online transaction volumes in the country are made through virtual account transfers. This method is popular because bank transfers are trusted and widely accessible (Indonesia has tens of millions of bank users), yet normal bank transfers are hard to reconcile. VAs solve this by identifying the payer instantly. For cross-border commerce, virtual accounts allow international merchants to collect funds locally. A global payment processor or its local partner will set up virtual account arrangements with major Indonesian banks (Mandiri, BRI, BCA, etc.) When a customer pays, the money is received in Indonesia and then remitted to the merchant abroad. Consumers see it as a regular bank transfer – no credit card or foreign currency is involved on their end. This method also bypasses concerns about credit limits or fraud, since the consumer initiates the payment. Virtual accounts are used for everything from buying airline tickets on international travel sites to paying for online games, all in Indonesian rupiah. The prevalence of VAs highlights how local banking infrastructure can be leveraged to facilitate C2B payments: even without a direct global card charge, Indonesians can participate in global e-commerce by using their bank accounts. Payment providers like DOKU, Midtrans (Xendit), and global ones like dLocal or Thunes incorporate virtual account capabilities to serve Indonesia. The success of Indonesia’s virtual account system – with tens of millions of transactions monthly – shows the importance of adapting to local banking norms in cross-border payment strategies. These case studies (Uzbekistan, Philippines, Indonesia) illustrate a common theme: global merchants rely on specialized payment intermediaries to integrate local payment methods into their checkout. Whether it’s accepting an Uzbek consumer’s Uzcard via a local acquiring bank, a Filipino user’s GCash wallet, or an Indonesian bank transfer via virtual account, the cross-border payment provider ensures the transaction is completed and funds are delivered to the business, often converting the currency and navigating local banking networks in the process.

=== Challenges and Future Outlook ===
Despite the progress in connecting consumers to global businesses, there are several challenges in cross-border C2B payments across emerging markets:

- Regulatory and Compliance Barriers: Cross-border payments must comply with a patchwork of national regulations, including foreign exchange controls, anti-money laundering (AML) rules, data protection laws, and licensing requirements. Each country often requires payment providers to partner with a locally licensed entity or obtain approval to handle local payments. Navigating these rules can be complex and costly. In some cases, governments impose limits on how much money can be sent abroad or require transactions to be processed through domestic switch systems. Regulatory hurdles are frequently cited as a major challenge to scaling cross-border payments.

Providers must also perform Know-Your-Customer (KYC) and fraud checks across borders, which can delay onboarding or transactions. Ensuring compliance in multiple jurisdictions simultaneously is an ongoing effort for all key players in this space.

- Currency Exchange and Settlement: Converting local currencies to the merchant’s currency introduces cost and risk. Fluctuating exchange rates can impact pricing and settlement amounts. Many emerging market currencies are volatile or not freely convertible, meaning payment companies need to manage liquidity and possibly hold balances in various currencies. High conversion fees or unfavorable rates can make cross-border purchases expensive for consumers. Additionally, the settlement time for funds to move from one country to another (especially if relying on correspondent banking) can be slow, affecting business cash flows. Traditional cross-border banking often involved multiple intermediaries and fees, but modern fintech players try to optimize this. Still, challenges remain in achieving instant, low-cost currency conversion for every corridor. In summary, currency conversion issues and foreign exchange costs are a key pain point noted by businesses engaging in cross-border transactions.
- Infrastructure Gaps: Not all countries have advanced payment infrastructure. Some regions still lack real-time payment systems or have low banking penetration, requiring creative solutions (such as cash-in vouchers or mobile money agents) to complete digital transactions. Network connectivity issues, outages in banking systems, or lack of standardization (e.g., differing QR code standards or account number formats) can hinder cross-border interoperability. Moreover, differences in addressing (IBAN vs local account numbers) and clearing systems make automation harder. Payment providers often need to maintain multiple integrations and fail-safes to ensure reliability. In emerging markets, the risk of transaction failure due to network issues or user error (for example, a consumer making a typo in a manual bank transfer) is higher, so providers must invest in customer support and reconciliation processes.
- Consumer Trust and Awareness: When paying an overseas merchant, consumers might be wary of fraud or unfamiliar processes. Local payment methods help address this by letting users pay in a way they trust (e.g., their usual wallet or bank app), but issues like scam attempts, phishing on banking apps, or lack of clarity if something goes wrong can affect confidence. Building trust requires localized customer support and clear communication (in local language) about how cross-border charges will appear, how refunds are handled, etc. Additionally, some consumers simply may not know that they can purchase from international websites using local methods – increasing awareness is part of the challenge for merchants and payment providers expanding into these markets.

== See also ==
- Business-to-consumer
- Business-to-government
- Consumer-to-consumer
- e-Business
- Business-to-business (B2B)
