= Giropay =

German online payment system, 2005–2024

- Type: GmbH
- Industry: Banking
- Founded: 2005; 21 years ago
- Founder: Deutsche Postbank
- Defunct: December 31, 2024
- Number of locations: 1,500 German Banks
- Area served: Germany
- Owner: paydirekt
- Website: www.giropay.de

Giropay was an Internet payment system in Germany, based on online banking. Introduced in February 2006, this payment method allowed customers to buy securely on the Internet using direct online transfers from their bank account. The system was similar to the Dutch iDEAL payment system, MyBank payment system, the Interac online service in Canada, pagomiscuentas payment service in Argentina, and Secure Vault Payments in the United States.

Giropay was owned by giropay GmbH until December 2020, when it was acquired by paydirekt. The two began a merger in May 2021. On 1 July 2024 paydirekt announced that the Giropay service will be shut down on 31 December 2024. Some payment providers stopped the service on 30 June 2024.

As decided, Giropay was finally discontinued on 31 December 2024. Paydirekt recommends the European payment service Wero as its successor.

== Transaction volume ==
By May 2007, more than 100 million euro in purchases had been made.

In 2008, the system processed 3.2 million transfers, with the transactions made totalling 185 million Euros.

Over one million such transactions are processed every month.

== Scope ==
Most German Sparkassen and cooperative banks are participating in Giropay. However, the number of participating banks from the private sector is limited. In this sector, the major participating banks are Deutsche Bank, Deutsche Postbank, Commerzbank and Comdirect Bank. Nevertheless, Giropay has a reach of about 17 million German online banking customers, and about 60% of all commercial bank accounts. That number means the participating banks are serving the vast majority of the German online banking market.

== Process ==
Giropay offers merchants a real-time payment method (publicized as virtually risk-free) to accept internet payments. For customers, Giropay uses the same environment as their banks' online banking sites. The level of security depends on the participating bank. Some German Banks offer two-factor authentication (2FA), such as a challenge–response access token based on the chip embedded in the debit card or ATM card. Others, however, offer simpler PIN and TAN based online banking services. No sensitive information is being shared with the merchant, such as credit card or Giro account numbers. There is no chargeback right however, which can be considered a disadvantage for the consumer using this payment method. This is considered an advantage to the merchants.

Giropay works as follows:

1. Merchant offers Giropay as payment method, often in addition to the regular credit card payment options
2. Consumer selects Giropay and selects their bank
3. Consumer is redirected to their bank's login page
4. Participating bank displays transaction data
5. Customer enters account number, PIN, and either:
  1. A remittance slip is sent to the customer for confirming the transaction, containing a TAN (transaction number). The customer enters this number to confirm the transaction.
  2. The customer signs the transaction digitally using a 2FA token (if their bank offers that service)
6. Bank authorizes transaction in real-time, deducting the amount directly from the consumer's account (if there is not enough balance, the transaction will be refused)
7. Merchant received real-time confirmation of the payment by the bank
8. Consumer is redirected back to the merchant page with a confirmation that the payment has been successful

Payments are guaranteed for amounts up to 5000 euros.

== Costs ==
Costs are calculated on a per-transaction basis and decrease with transaction volume or value. The NetBanx payment gateway quotes figures from 1.2% to 0.9%, plus €0.08 per transaction.

== See also ==
- Elektronisches Lastschriftverfahren, a German direct debit system
- Wero, a European payment service by European Payment Initiative
