= Interpay =

Dutch payment processor

- Interpay Nederland B.V.
- Merged into: Equens together with Transaktionsinstitut für Zahlungsverkehrsdienstleistungen AG
- Formation: 1994
- Dissolved: 2006
- Merger of: BeaNet, Bankgirocentrale and Eurocard Nederland
- Purpose: Payment processing
- Location: Utrecht, Netherlands
- Region served: The Netherlands
- Official language: Dutch
- Owner: ABN Amro, Rabobank, ING Bank, Fortis Bank, SNS Bank, F. van Lanschot Bankiers, Friesland Bank and Bank Nederlandse Gemeenten.
- Website: interpay.nl at the Wayback Machine (archived 2006-01-06)

Interpay Nederland B.V. was the Dutch payment processor and payment product provider that operated from 1994 until 2006. Interpay owned the payment systems PIN, Chipknip, Acceptgiro and Incasso. The organisation was owned by a consortium of Dutch banks. In 2005, they spun off Currence which in 2006 merged with German company Transaktionsinstitut für Zahlungsverkehrsdienstleistungen AG to form Equens.

== History ==
History of Interpay

Interpay was founded as a merger between BeaNet, the Bankgirocentrale and Eurocard Nederland.

ING Group was the largest shareholder of Interpay, at around 30%.

In 1995, Interpay started with a pilot of the Chipknip.

Trouw noted in 2001 that a smooth transition to the Euro was dependent on Interpay. In 2003, Annemarie Jorritsma became a commissioner at Interpay.

In September 2003, Interpay started together with Banksys and SSB the company Sinsys for credit cards, to reduce costs. Sinsys ultimately became wholly owned by SIA in 2012.

Director Willem Stolwijk left in 2006 and was replaced by Ben Haasdijk. In 2004, Interpay was forced to lower their tariffs for the hospitality sector. The Netherlands Competition Authority fined Interpay for 30 million euros because their tariffs were 5 to 7 times too high. In 2004, Interpay sold their Document Services division to Unisys.

In September 2006, it was merged with the German Transaktionsinstitut to form Equens.

== Transaction processing ==
In 2005, Interpay processed 3.3 billion financial transactions.

== Subsidiaries ==
Interpay had two subsidiaries: Paysquare which facilitated the acceptance of credit cards, and InterEGI which distributed the prepaid Chipknip.
