= Person-to-person =

Person-to-person and person to person may refer to:

- Person-to-person call, a type of operator assisted telephone call
- Peer-to-peer lending, also called P2P or person-to-person lending

== Film and television ==
- Person to Person, a 1953–61 American television series
- Person to Person (Australian TV series), a 1959–1960 Australian television series
- "Person to Person" (Mad Men), the final episode of the TV series Mad Men
- Person to Person (film), a 2017 film directed by Dustin Guy Defa

== Music ==
- Person to Person (Mildred Anderson album), 1960
- Person to Person (George Cables album), 1995
- Person to Person!, a 1970 album by Houston Person
- Person to Person: Live at the Blue Note, a 2003 Ben E. King album
- Person to Person, a 2009 album by Foreign Born
- "Person to Person", a song by Screamin' Jay Hawkins

== See also ==
- P2P (disambiguation)
- Peer-to-peer (disambiguation)
- Peer-to-peer, a distributed computing architecture
