= Payconiq =

Mobile electronic payment platform in Belgium, The Netherlands and Luxembourg

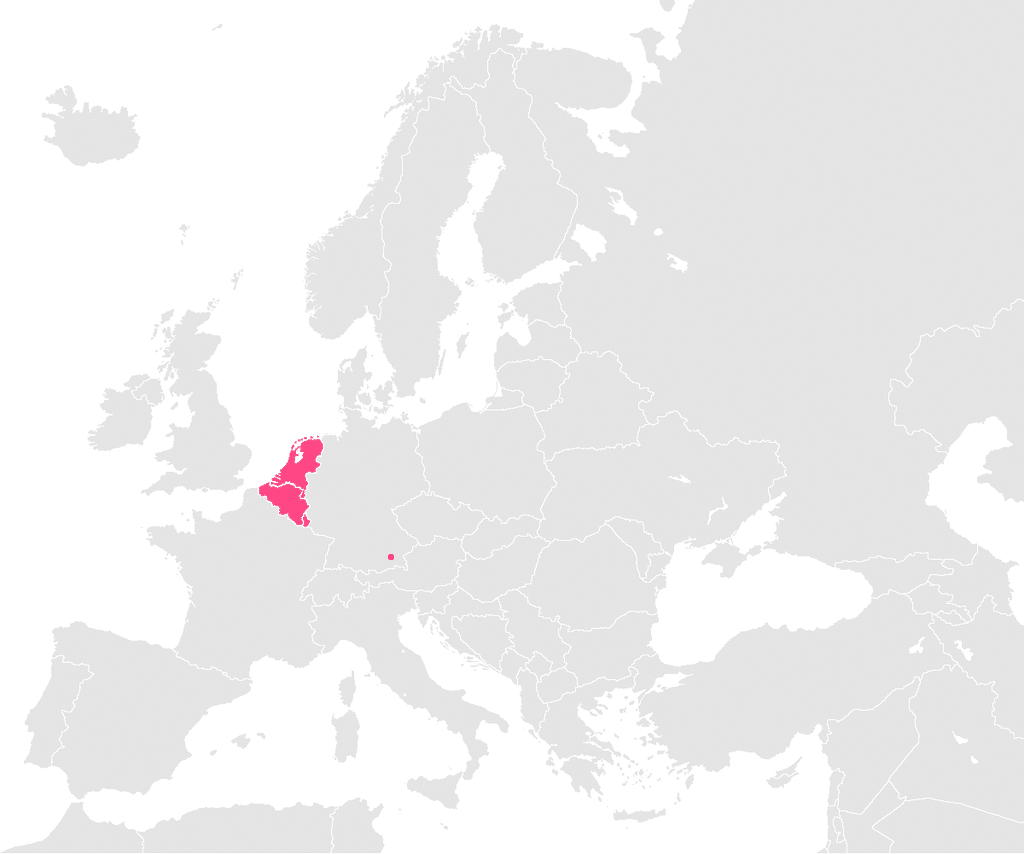
- Payconiq services are available in Belgium, Luxembourg and the city of Munich.
- Industry: Financial services
- Founded: 2015
- Founder: ING Group
- Headquarters: Luxembourg, Luxembourg
- Key people: Stijn Van Brussel (CEO)
- Products: Mobile applications
- Owner: EPI (2023–present)
- Website: payconiq.com

Payconiq International S.A. is a Luxembourg-based company developing a mobile payment and payment processing platform, active in Luxembourg and Belgium. Since October 2023, it has been controlled by The European Payments Initiative (EPI).

Payconiq had the initial support of ING Bank, which was joined later by Belgian banks KBC Bank and Belfius, and launched its first minimum-viable product in Belgium, in 2015.

The mobile app offers a multi-country payment solutions in Benelux, through different types of integration: stand-alone apps, bank app integrations and more.

== Belgium ==
Payconiq launched in 2015 with Belgium as first market. The fintech startup was part of an internal incubator project at ING. In July 2016 Belgian bank KBC joined Payconiq, in favor over its own Citylife mobile payment solution. And in December 2016 Belgium bank Belfius joined Payconiq.

Payconiq Belgium and the Belgian payment system Bancontact announced in March 2018 their intention to merge. The merger was finalized in July 2018 and the company is currently named Bancontact Payconiq Company. The new company got a capital injection of €17,6 million from its five major shareholders Belfius, BNP Paribas Fortis, ING, KBC and AXA. It then also merged its two existing payment apps called 'Payconiq' and 'Bancontact' into one app called 'Payconiq by Bancontact' which was supported by 20 Belgian banks and 290.000 stores in Belgium.

In 2019, the Payconiq payment solution was integrated in KBC's mobile bank app, followed by ING Belgium, in 2020.

== Luxembourg ==
Payconiq established in Luxembourg through the acquisition of the Luxembourgish fintech startup Digicash Payments, in 2017.

In 2019, the company received its Payment Initiation Service license from the Luxembourgish regulator CSSF and some extra financing from its shareholders, amounting to EUR 20 million.

In 2020, the five Digicash apps were rebranded to Digicash by Payconiq, as the company made all its mobile solutions in the Benelux area interoperable. From 2021 the Digicash merchants started migrating to the Payconiq platform.

Between 1 July and 30 September 2026, all Luxemburg customers of the Payconiq payment system, including merchants formerly offering payments via Payconiq, will fully switch to Wero. The Payconiq payment app will be permanently shut down on 30 September.

== The Netherlands ==
Payconiq Netherlands was established in 2018, when the Payconiq mobile payment app was launched into the market, having shareholders in the main Dutch banks: ASN Bank, ING, Rabobank, Regiobank, and SNS.

In March 2021 Payconiq International was selected as technology provider for iDEAL 2.0. The Payconiq service itself was discontinued in the Netherlands on 1 January 2022 due to supporting banks choosing to focus their efforts on the competing iDEAL service.

== Germany ==
Payconiq was launched in Germany, as pilot in Munich in January 2018. The service in Germany was stopped. (Exact sunset date unknown)

== System ==
The Payconiq platform connects banks, merchants, payment service providers and consumers, to enable Omni-channel payments online, in store, by invoice or peer-to-peer. It is an API-based platform, allowing for a fast connection and value-added services.

Consumers can download one of the stand-alone apps or use the Payconiq integration in their mobile banking apps (where available), according to their country of residence. They connect their bank account to the app and then are able to make payments to affiliated merchants by scanning a QR-code, or to friends (by e-mail address or cellphone number).

== Acquisition by EPI ==
On 31 October 2023 the European Payments Initiative announced the closure of the acquisition of Payconiq International, as well as the Dutch payment system Currence iDEAL, in line with its strategy of delivering a unified instant payment scheme for Europe.

EPI's payment solution, empowered by Payconiq and iDEAL's expertise, will incorporate a comprehensive range of use cases: person-to-person (P2P) and person-to-professional (P2Pro) payments, followed by online and mobile shopping payments and then point-of-sale payments. A wide range of transaction types will be supported, including one-off payments, subscriptions, installments, payments upon delivery and reservations.

Additionally, value-added services will be incorporated into the solution over time, including responsible ‘Buy Now, Pay Later’ (BNPL) financing, digital identity features and integration of merchant loyalty programmes.

The deployment of the new digital wallet by EPI, Wero, is scheduled for 2024 in France, Germany, and Belgium, followed by the Netherlands and other European countries at a later stage.
