= Direct to consumer =

Direct to consumer may refer to:

- Direct-to-consumer, or business-to-consumer (B2C) is the business model of selling products directly to customers and thereby bypassing any third-party retailers, wholesalers, or any other middlemen. Direct-to-consumer sales are usually transacted online, but direct-to-consumer brands may also operate physical retail spaces as a complement to their main e-commerce platform in a clicks-and-mortar business model.
- Direct-to-consumer advertising, refers to the marketing and advertising of pharmaceutical products directly to consumers as patients, as opposed to specifically targeting health professionals
- Direct selling, business model that involves a party buying products from a parent organisation and selling them directly to customers
- Direct marketing, a form of communicating an offer, where organizations communicate directly to a pre-selected customer and supply a method for a direct response

== See also ==
- Consumer-to-business
- Direct market
