= Currency (disambiguation) =

A currency is a particular authorized monetary system, monetized in specific units (e.g., euros, dollars, pesos, etc.) which may be given international value by their exchange values in foreign exchange.

Currency may also refer to:

== Economics and finance ==
Currency, in economics, may refer to:

- Banknotes, the paper or non-metal circulating medium of exchange of a country
- Banknotes and coins, all circulating media of exchange of a particular government
- Money, any generally accepted medium of exchange, including non-physical media

Some types of currency include:

- Complementary currency (or alternative currency), a currency or medium of exchange which is not a national currency (i.e., not legal tender), but which is thought of as supplementing or complementing national currencies
  - Cryptocurrency (or crypto currency), a digital asset designed to work as a medium of exchange that uses cryptography to secure its transactions, to control the creation of additional units, and to verify the transfer of asset
  - Digital currency (or digital money or electronic currency or electronic money), a type of currency available only in digital, not physical, form (such as banknotes and coins)
  - Fiat currency or fiat money, a currency without intrinsic value established as money, often by government regulation
  - Virtual currency (or virtual money), a type of unregulated, digital money, which is issued and usually controlled by its developers, and used and accepted among the members of a specific virtual community

== Arts, entertainment, and media ==
- Currency (album), an album by the rapper Lil' Keke
- Currency (film), a 2009 Malayalam film by Swathy Bhaskar
- "Currency" (Billions), a 2017 television episode
- Currency, an imprint of Crown Publishing Group

== Other uses ==
- Currency sign (generic), a character used to denote a non-specific currency
- Currency lads and lasses, colonial-born Australians

== See also ==
- Currensy (born 1981), American rapper
- Currence, Dutch payment organization
- Monopoly money
- Play money
- Scrip
