= Bancomat =

Bancomat may refer to:

- Bancomat (interbank network), in Italy
- ATM, also known as bancomat
