= Wim Scherpenhuijsen Rom =

Dutch banker (1933–2020)

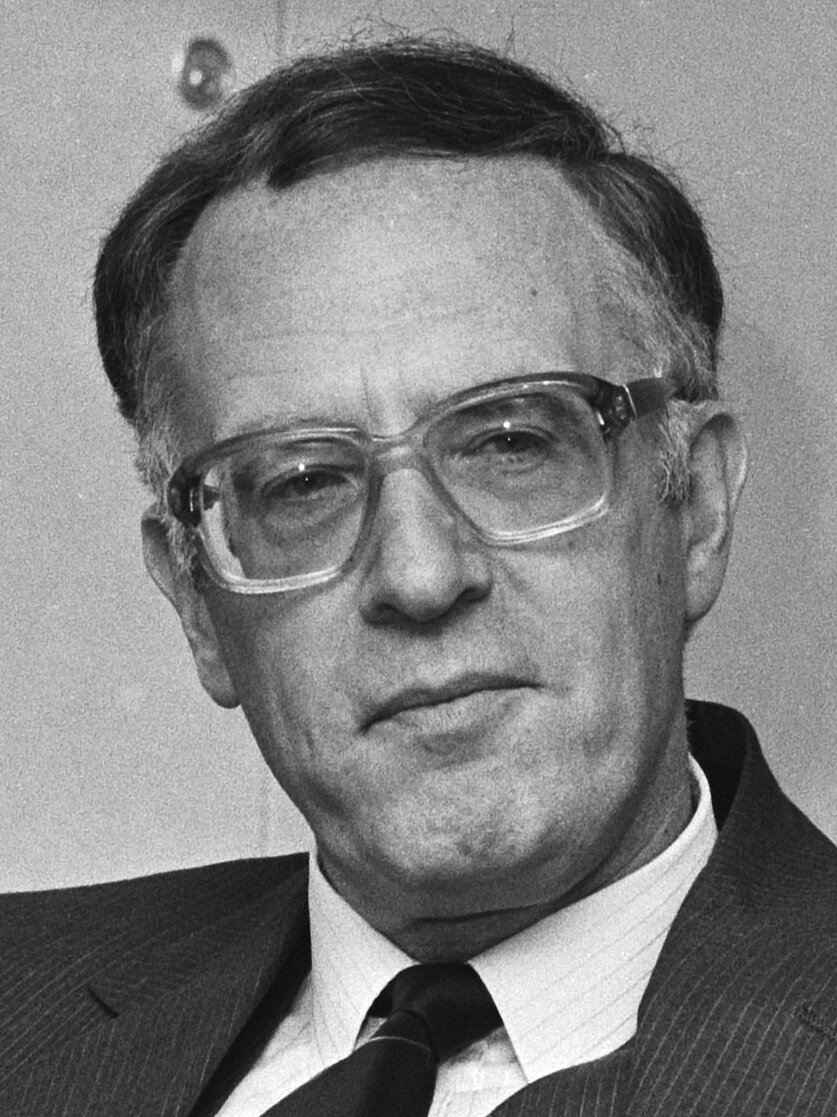
- Scherpenhuijsen Rom in 1985
- Born: Willem Elmert Scherpenhuijsen Rom; 15 March 1933; Utrecht
- Died: 31 July 2020 (aged 87)
- Occupation: Banker

Willem Elmert “Wim” Scherpenhuijsen Rom (15 March 1933 – 31 July 2020) was a Dutch banker. He was co-founder of the ING Group.

Scherpenhuijsen Rom started working at NMB Bank in 1967, the predecessor of ING. He was main person in the fusion between NMB Bank and Postbank in 1989. He became CEO of the ING Group in 1992. He was also highly involved in the merger of NMB Postbank Group and Nationale-Nederlanden in the early 1990s.

Scherpenhuijsen Rom died on 31 July 2020, aged 87.
