= Digital euro =

Central bank digital currency project

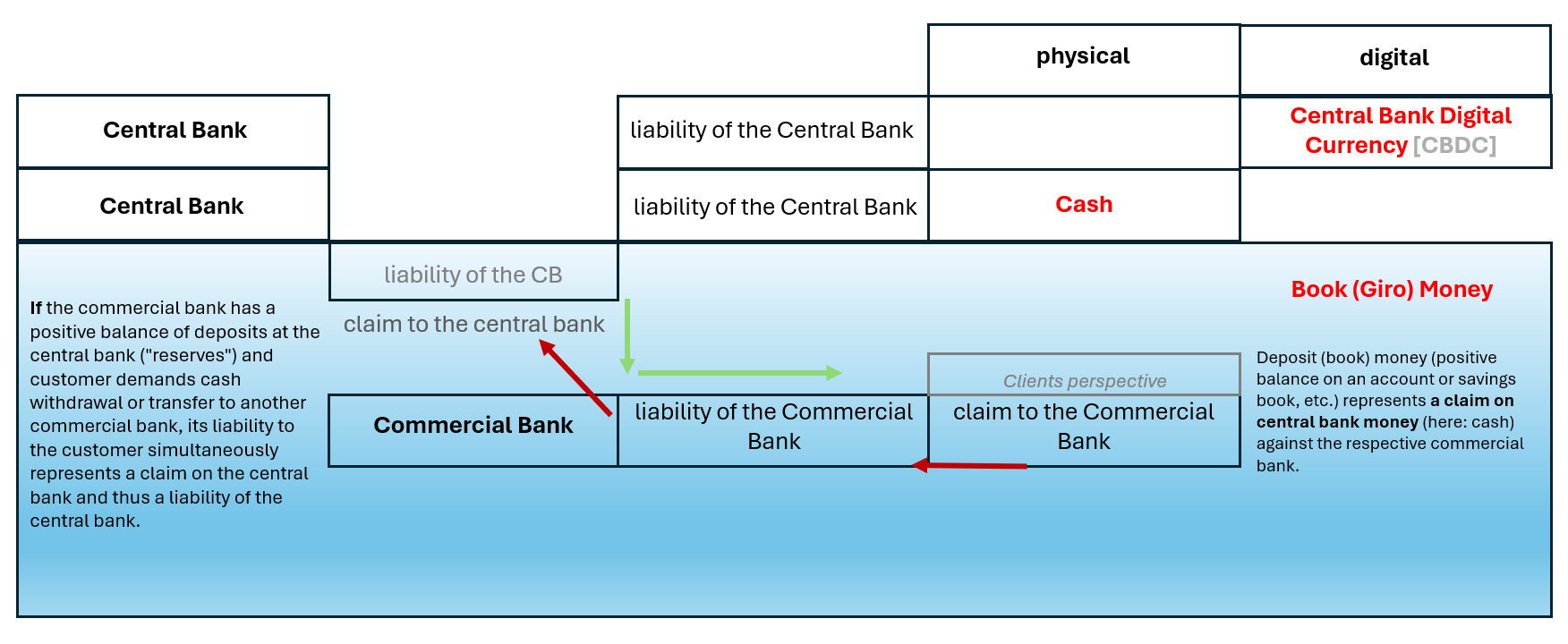
Comparing Digital Euro as a CBDC, Cash, Book Money, liabilities and asset claims

The digital euro is a project of the Eurosystem, launched in July 2021, to explore the possible introduction of a central bank digital currency (CBDC). The aim is to develop a fast and secure electronic payment instrument that would complement the euro for individuals and businesses in its existing form as cash and in bank accounts, and would be issued by the Eurosystem. The ECB has stated that the digital euro would not be based on blockchain or other distributed ledger technologies.

As of 2025, the Governing Council of the European Central Bank (ECB) has decided to move to the next phase of the digital euro project, following the completion of the preparation phase launched by the Eurosystem in November 2023. The ECB stated that, assuming EU legislation is adopted in 2026, the Eurosystem aims to be ready for a potential first issuance of a digital euro by 2029, with testing beginning from mid-2027.

== Design and proposed features ==
ECB project documents describe the digital euro as a retail payment instrument intended to complement cash and existing electronic payments, with payment services provided by supervised intermediaries under a common scheme rulebook.

The ECB has described the preparation work as covering areas including privacy protections, offline functionality and a rulebook for participating payment service providers.

European Commission proposals for a digital euro regulation describe objectives including maintaining availability of central bank money for the public and ensuring a high level of privacy in digital payments, while supporting accessibility and financial inclusion.

=== Off-line transactions ===
ECB project documents describe an offline digital euro functionality allowing close proximity payments to be made without an internet connection to support situations where connectivity is unavailable.

According to the European Commission’s proposal for a digital euro regulation, offline digital euro payments would provide a cash-like level of privacy, with transaction data remaining locally between payer and payee, while excluding full anonymity. No loss recovery will be provided for offline digital euros held in damaged, lost or stolen devices, despite of available technologies to do so.

=== Privacy and data protection ===
The digital euro is designed with a privacy-by-design approach, to ensure a high level of data protection while complying with existing EU anti-money laundering (AML) and counter-terrorist-financing (CFT) rules.

For offline payments, the ECB has stated that transaction details would be known only to the payer and the payee, offering a cash-like degree of privacy.

For online payments, the ECB has indicated that the Eurosystem would not be able to directly identify users, with payment data pseudonymised and encrypted. Supervised intermediaries would continue to carry out AML/CFT checks, similar to current electronic payment systems.

== History ==
As cash usage declined and private digital payment providers became more prominent, the European Central Bank began an investigation into the possible creation of a digital euro. According to the European Central Bank, a digital euro would ensure that citizens and businesses retain access to central bank money in digital form and complement existing electronic payment services, addressing changes in payment behaviour and the lack of a pan-European retail digital payment option.

=== 2020 ===
On 2 October 2020, the ECB published a report outlining the introduction of a digital euro from the perspective of the Eurosystem.

=== 2021 ===
After preliminary planning and presenting public consultation results in early 2021, the ECB launched the digital euro project in July 2021 to prepare for its potential introduction. No technical barriers were identified during the preliminary planning. The research, which is scheduled to run until autumn 2023, aims to shed light on the distribution to merchants and citizens, the impact on markets and the necessary European legislation. No preliminary decision has therefore been taken on the introduction of the digital euro.

=== 2022 ===
In September 2022, the ECB announces a collaboration with five companies (Amazon, CaixaBank, Worldline, EPI and Nexi) to develop potential user interfaces for the digital euro.

Burkhard Balz, a member of the Bundesbank's Executive Board, sees the digital euro not least as a means of strengthening European sovereignty in payments. In his view, the digital euro could be designed to support programmable payments in a highly automated environment.

The first "Progress on the investigation phase of a digital euro" report was published by the ECB in September 2022.

Speaking at the conference "Towards a legislative framework enabling a digital euro for citizens and businesses" held in Brussels in early November 2022, Christine Lagarde, President of the European Central Bank, reiterated that the digital euro is not a stand-alone project limited to the area of payments. Rather, it is a cross-policy and truly European initiative that has the potential to have an impact on society as a whole.

In December 2022, the ECB published the second progress report on the investigation phase.

=== 2023 ===
In January 2023, the ECB invited experts in the field of payments/finance to express their interest in contributing to the development of a set of rules for the digital euro.

At the end of May 2023, the ECB published the results of a market research and prototyping project. The market research had shown that there was a sufficiently large pool of European vendors capable of developing digital euro solutions. It had also shown that different types of architectural and technological design options were available to develop a technical solution for a digital euro. The prototyping project involved the integration of five user interfaces developed by different vendors for each use case (front-end prototypes) and a settlement system designed and developed by the Eurosystem (back-end prototype). Different design options were tested to determine whether they could be technically implemented and integrated into the Eurosystem's settlement system. The tests showed that it would be possible to integrate a digital euro smoothly into the existing payment landscape, while leaving room for the market to use innovative features and technologies in the dissemination of a digital euro. The results also confirmed that, in principle, a digital euro could function both online and offline using different technical concepts. The question remains whether an offline solution that meets the Eurosystem's requirements and achieves the necessary scale can be implemented in the short to medium term using existing technology.

On 18 October 2023 the ECB announced that a decision had been made to move forward with preparation phase.

=== 2024 ===
In December 2024, the ECB released its second progress report on the digital euro project, detailing advancements made between May and October 2024. During this period, the Rulebook Development Group (RDG) completed a review of the initial draft of the rulebook, addressing approximately 2,500 comments. Subsequently, seven new RDG workstreams were initiated to focus on critical areas such as minimum user experience standards, risk management, and implementation specifications. These efforts aim to refine the digital euro's framework, ensuring it meets the Eurosystem's objectives and aligns with legislative developments within the European Union.

=== 2025 ===
On 31 January 2025, ECB President Christine Lagarde and European Commission President Ursula von der Leyen published an op-ed in which they cited the digital euro project as part of an effort to keep Europe at the forefront of digital payment technologies.

In August 2025, with the new U.S. administration actively supporting the development of dollar-linked stablecoins and 99% of official currency-backed stablecoins being tied to the U.S. dollar, Lagarde urged European lawmakers to "seize the 'euro moment'" and rapidly put in place a legislative framework to "pave the way for the potential introduction of a digital euro," to address the risk posed by stablecoins.

On 30 October 2025, the ECB announced that the preparation phase begun in November 2023 had concluded and that the Governing Council had decided to move to the next phase of the digital euro project. The ECB said the new phase would focus on technical readiness; assuming EU legislation is adopted in 2026, a pilot exercise could begin in 2027 and the Eurosystem would aim to be ready for a potential first issuance during 2029.

=== 2026 ===
On 23 June 2026, the European Parliament voted to adopt the digital euro.

While the negotiation started in January, a group of 70 economists and academic experts, including Thomas Piketty and Paul de Grauwe, and former central bank governor Miguel Ordóñez, published an open letter to the European Parliament. In the letter, reported by the Financial Times and around thirty European news outlets, the signatories argued that a robust public digital euro is the "only defence" against Europe's deepening dependence on US-based payment systems and the associated geopolitical risks. The economists warned policymakers against "shortsighted" lobbying by the banking industry intended to scale down the project. They advocated for a digital euro designed as a public good that is universally accessible, privacy-preserving, and functional offline to ensure monetary sovereignty and resilience. This intervention stands in contrast to the position of the Parliament's lead rapporteur, Fernando Navarrete, who has advocated for a significantly scaled-down version of the project.

On 10 February, the European Parliament passed a resolution which explicitly endorsed the creation of a digital euro as "essential to strengthen EU monetary sovereignty" and emphasizes the necessity of both online and offline functionalities to "safeguard universal access to payments". Two amendments to this resolution, tabled by Pasquale Tridico, proved decisive in unblocking the separate digital euro legislative negotiations, which had been gridlocked for months: by establishing the digital euro as a single, unified online-and-offline payment system, they demonstrated that a plenary majority existed in its favour, effectively forcing through an outcome that Fernando Navarrete, the Parliament's centre-right rapporteur on the digital euro file, had blocked for months. While the vote was symbolic, it signals a clear disavowal for Navarrete, whose position appears marginalized even within his own political group (the EPP).

According to Damian Boeselager, vice-chair of the ECON Committee, MEPs agreed in June on an integrated payment system designed to enable both offline and online payments.

On 9 July, the European Parliament signaled its support for renewed negotiations to create a digital euro. Some 416 delegates voted in favor, 169 against and 22 abstentions.

== Reception and views ==
According to Reuters, EU institutions, banks, and commentators, voiced doubts about the project after an outage in the ECB's TARGET2 system, arguing the ECB would need to demonstrate that the infrastructure for a digital euro could be secure and reliable. Reuters also reported that the project has faced resistance from parts of the banking sector over concerns about deposit outflows and implementation costs, while ECB President Christine Lagarde urged lawmakers to accelerate legislation in part as a response to the growth of U.S.-dollar stablecoins. In December 2025, Reuters reported that EU governments agreed a negotiating stance that supports both online and offline functionality and endorsed the use of holding limits to address financial-stability concerns, as legislative negotiations continued.

Academic and policy commentators have also analysed the proposed design. A 2025 article in Electronic Markets described the project as complex and argued that high public adoption and sufficient incentives for intermediaries would be important to justify investment and integrate a digital euro into the existing payments landscape. In the same year, Digital Finance published a paper criticising the proposed design, pointing at GNU Taler as an implementation of a more robust design. A 2024 VoxEU column likewise argued that debate has often centred on potential risks to banks, and discussed design choices (including possible holding limits) intended to mitigate those concerns. Legal scholar Prof. Dr. Šime Jozipović has argued that the digital euro is intended to function as “a digital means of payment similar to cash”, emphasising the importance of maintaining access to public central-bank money in digital form while balancing privacy and regulatory oversight.

=== European Commission ===
The European Commission has submitted a legislative proposal for the introduction of a digital euro that should be made available as a legal tender not only to banks, but above all to the general public. Presented on 28 June 2023, this proposal outlines the fundamental requirements for its possible implementation. However, the final decision lies with EU member states and the European Parliament, who are currently —12 November 2024— negotiating this proposal. If the legislation is approved, the European Central Bank (ECB) will further develop the technical and operational aspects, aiming to create a secure and reliable digital euro, available alongside cash and traditional bank payment accounts.

Additionally, the proposal aims to protect user privacy, similar to cash, without extra oversight of individual transactions by the governments. For security purposes, there are considerations for limits on the amount individuals can hold in digital euros. All of this forms part of a preparatory phase that may take several years, with an expected implementation date from 2028 if the legislation is approved.

=== Eurogroup ===
For Paschal Donohoe, president of the Eurogroup, a body of finance ministers from euro member states, the digital euro project is about maintaining the link between citizens and central bank money: as central bank money, the digital euro would be convertible one-to-one into euro banknotes.

Unlike the industry, the Eurogroup does not want the digital euro to be equipped with additional functions.

=== Civil society organisations ===
The Verbraucherzentrale Bundesverband (Public German Consumer Protection Organisation) sees the digital euro as a public good and thus an opportunity to make digital payments more consumer-oriented.

=== German banking industry ===
From the perspective of the German Banking Industry Committee, the global trend toward central bank digital currency is unmistakable and represents both an opportunity and a challenge. The planned introduction of a digital euro is seen as an important contribution to the digitalization of the economy and society and to securing Europe's sovereignty and competitiveness. The digital money ecosystem proposed in a policy paper is intended to go beyond digital cash and consists of three elements:

- Retail CBDC for personal use
- Wholesale CBDC for banks and savings banks
- Bank money tokens for industrial use

The Association of German Banks supports the introduction of a digital euro. In a position paper published in February 2023, the private banks emphasize the evolution of cash, their role in its issuance, its openness to innovation, and their desire to minimize the risks of its introduction. Among the risks, the private banks specifically mention those affecting their business (disintermediation, diminishing returns, weakening of their customer relationship) and that a weakening of their investment capabilities could lead to the failure of the digital euro.

The Bundesverband der Deutschen Volksbanken und Raiffeisenbanken (BdV) welcomes the ECB's plans for a digital euro, but criticizes that the needs of the economy for a future digital payment method have not yet been sufficiently taken into account.

=== German industrial sector ===
In a position paper published at the end of September 2022, the Bundesverband der Deutschen Industrie (BDI, Federation of German Industries) warns that the needs of the industry must be taken into account when introducing a digital euro. The programmability of payments is a key demand.

The German Informatics Society (GI) sees the introduction of a digital euro and the simultaneous decline of cash as a threat to informational self-determination and privacy; there is a danger of the Gläserner Mensch (German metaphor for data protection, inspired by the Transparent Man in the German Hygiene Museum, representing the complete "screening" of people and their behavior by a monitoring state, which is perceived as negative).

== See also ==
- European Payments Initiative
