= Universal credit card =

2010s concept for electronic bank cards

A universal card was a concept in the early 2010s for an electronic card with the same form factor as a magnetic stripe card that was capable of emulating any magnetic stripe data card. Data would be stored either in the card, or on a smart phone that communicates with it. It would allow consumer to consolidating their credit, debit, membership, loyalty, gift cards and other forms of magnetic stripe data cards into one card. Certain universal card products also added an extra layer of security to protect their cards against theft.

As the payment industry moved away from magnetic stripe cards with EMV and contactless payments the concept became less useful for consumers. Several startups attempted to launch such a card but it failed to take off.

== History ==
The universal card movement began when near field communication-based mobile wallet solutions initially failed to gain ground and presented numerous difficulties, the two biggest being the cost of replacing hardware at the merchants point of sale and customers needing a near field communication-capable phone. Since iCache's financial blunder with their Geode card in mid-2012, a number of companies tried to perfect and capitalize on a universal card type product.

Escardgot Inc was founded in October 2011, and quietly build a prototype in the background. They were notable for having a working prototype that was demonstrated in front of a live audience at FinovateSpring 2013. While other notable players in the field were still patent-pending, Escardgot's HELIX card already had patents on its technology (US Patent: 8,313,037; US Patent: 8,376,239).

The Coin card entered into the market with hype and targeted ads, immediately opening up their own crowd sourcing page for customers to sign up to pre-order a card ahead of its release in 2014. Another company, Protean, also created a lot of buzz for their product, before its release date, following the path of Geode.

As the financial industry moved away from magnet stripe cards it became less useful and the concept failed to take off.

== Operation ==
The main distinguishing feature of the universal card was its capability of reprogramming its magnetic stripe internally, to mimic the data stored on another card. The handful of start ups with a universal card type product found different ways of achieving this, leading to different complexities and capabilities of the universal card.

Universal cards either stored data within the form factor, or within a device such as a smart phone that communicates with the card via Bluetooth. Escardgot's Helix, Protean's Echo, and Omne all had respective apps for smart phones that stores a potentially limitless number of the user's cards. Coin stores up to eight cards in a microchip inside the card itself. To scan the user's data, all of them either require manual input into a smartphone app or a use of a mini card scanner that plugged into the phone's headphone jack.

== See also ==
- Digital wallet
