= European Network for Payments =

European banking organisation

The European Network for Payments (abbreviated as ENP) is a joint venture aiming at developing a unified European payment solution and facilitating the interoperability of mobile payment solutions provided by several firms. The European Payments Alliance was created in December 2023 by Italian interbank network Bancomat, Spanish mobile payment firm Bizum and Portuguese firm SIBS (which operates the mobile payment service MB Way).

== First steps ==
In December 2023, Bancomat, Bizum and SIBS signed a letter of intention in order to create a partnership in digital payment.

In November 2024, Bancomat, Bizum and SIBS officially launched EuroPA (European Payments Alliance), a service allowing their respective users and clients to make instant payments using their mobile phones across the three countries (Italy, Spain and Portugal). The three firms also announced that they were in talks to add more firms to their partnership in order to expand their service in Europe.

On 31 March 2025, Bancomat, Bizum and MB Way launched the first instant cross-border transactions.

In May 2025, Norwegian mobile payment service provider Vipps MobilePay and Polish mobile payment system Blik signed a letter of intent to join the EuroPA-alliance, thus expanding the reach of the interoperable system to users in Denmark, Finland, Norway, Poland, Sweden. In June 2025, Greek firm DIAS (which operates the IRIS payment system) joined EuroPA.

In May 2026, Bulgarian mobile payment service provider BORICA, which operates the blink instant payment system, announced it had joined the European Payments Alliance and would "gradually expand its coverage and enable instant transfers between users in Bulgaria, Spain, Portugal, Greece, Italy, and all other countries participating in the initiative".

In July 2026, Greek IRIS payment system launched cross-border transfers with Italy, Portugal and Spain.

=== Creation of the European Network for Payments ===
In September 2026, Bancomat, Bizum, EPI Company/Wero, SIBS-MB Way and Vipps MobilePay announced the creation of the European Network for Payments (ENP).

== Partnerships ==
On 23 June 2025, the EuroPA alliance (European Payments Alliance) and European Payments Initiative announced that they will cooperate and create a partnership in order to explore solutions for developing a cross-border digital payments solution aimed at improving payment interoperability within Europe. Such a partnership would cover 15 European countries (with a combined population of around 382 million inhabitants, amounting to 84% of the European Union and Norway) and this interconnection of existing payment solutions could provide the EU with a path towards sovereignty and independence from the US in terms of payment solutions (a market dominated by US payment card services firms like Visa; Mastercard and American Express). In September 2025, EuroPA and EPI reaffirmed their intention to interconnect their respective payment solutions and announced the finalization of a feasibility study by December 2025.

== See also ==
- Euro Alliance of Payment Schemes, a previous failed European attempt to unify European payment systems
- European Payments Initiative, a similar initiative aiming at creating a European digital payment solution through a digital wallet called Wero
- Instant payment
