= Blik =

Mobile payment system

- Developer: Polski Standard Płatności S. A.
- Release: February 9, 2015; 11 years ago
- Available in: Polish, English
- Type: Mobile payment
- Website: blik.com

BLIK is a Polish mobile payment system launched in 2015. It is operated by Polski Standard Płatności (PSP).

Blik enables users to make instant payments online and in retail stores, withdraw cash from ATMs, and transfer money, primarily using their bank's mobile application.

As of June 2024, Blik reported nearly 17 million active users. For the full year 2024, it processed 2.4 billion transactions, amounting to a total value of approximately 350 billion Polish złoty (PLN).

== History ==
Polski Standard Płatności (PSP), a company established by an alliance of six Polish banks, launched Blik in February 2015. PSP is a member of the European Mobile Payment Systems Association.

Between 2019 and 2020, Polish police reported fraud incidents involving Blik ATM withdrawals. These typically occurred when perpetrators gained access to a victim's social media account, requested Blik codes from the victim's contacts under false pretenses for a loan, and then used these codes for cash withdrawals.

Between May 2022 and May 2024, Poland's Central Bureau for Combating Cybercrime dismantled a larger organized group of eleven people operating in Poland and Germany that used phishing websites mimicking well-known news portals to hijack victims' Facebook accounts and extract one-time Blik codes for fraudulent transactions.

In 2021, Blik introduced contactless payments, enabling users with NFC-equipped Android devices to make payments at POS terminals using Mastercard virtual tokens. This functionality also extends to Polish users traveling abroad.

Revolut became the first foreign financial institution to integrate Blik in November 2024. While Revolut users in the EU with a PLN account can access Blik, its use is currently restricted to transactions with Polish businesses.

In May 2025, Blik signed a letter of intent to join the European Payments Alliance (EuroPA), an initiative to provide interoperable mobile payment solutions throughout Europe, launched by Italian, Spanish and Portuguese firms.

== Services ==
The system allows users to make online and in-store purchases and to transfer money in real time between bank accounts and ATMs, including cash withdrawal from ATMs, without the need of a payment card.

Transactions are uniquely identified by 6-digit one-time codes, each time valid for up to 2 minutes, which the user obtains using their mobile banking app. The code can then be typed in online, entered on the ATM screen, or on compatible contactless payment terminals. The payment requires final authentification of the vendor and transaction amount in the app and is instantaneous.

Blik allows instant transfers between users by binding phone numbers to bank accounts. These transfers are similarly free and instantaneous, even between accounts from different banks. Some online shopping platforms, like Allegro, can connect a customer account to a Blik-compatible app instance, allowing for payment confirmation with just a notification prompt and pin code or biometric login.

== Participating banks ==
The Blik service is available from more than a dozen banks, including:

- Alior Bank
- Bank Millennium
- BNP Paribas
- Citi Handlowy
- Crédit Agricole
- ING Bank Śląski
- Nest Bank
- mBank
- Bank Pocztowy
- Bank Pekao
- PKO Bank Polski & Inteligo
- Revolut
- Santander Bank Polska
- Bank Polskiej Spółdzielczości (BPS)
- Spółdzielcza Grupa Bankowa (SGB)

== See also ==
- Bizum
- iDEAL
- Swish (payment)
