= Currence =

Dutch payments organization

- Currence Holding B.V.
- Currence Logo
- Formation: January 1, 2005; 21 years ago
- Founders: Major Dutch banks
- Type: Trade association
- Location: Amsterdam, Netherlands
- CEO: Daniel van Delft
- Website: www.currence.nl/en

Currence Holding B.V. is a Dutch trade association set up by banks that coordinates the payment systems in the Netherlands. Its aim is to "facilitate and provide market transparency while maintaining the quality and safety of the payment systems of the Netherlands."

Currence is the brand owner of a number of the Dutch payment systems that included PIN, Chipknip until these were discontinued, Acceptgiro, Incasso/Machtigen and up until 2023 iDEAL.

== History ==
Currence was founded on 1 January 2005 through an initiative by eight Dutch banks (ABN AMRO, Rabobank, ING Groep, Fortis, SNS Bank, BNG, Friesland Bank and Van Lanschot Kempen). It was originally known as Brandts & Licences Betalingsverkeer Nederland B.V. during its development stage and was renamed as Currence from the 17 May 2005.

Currence's CEO was Piet Mallekoote between 2013 and 2021 when he retired, he was followed by Daniel van Delft as CEO.

In April 2023, Currence agreed for European Payments Initiative (EPI) to acquire the iDEAL payment system to build a European wide system. The key members of the Currence and shareholders in iDeal are also shareholders in EPI.
