= Fernando Navarrete =

Spanish politician (born 1976)

Fernando Navarrete MEP
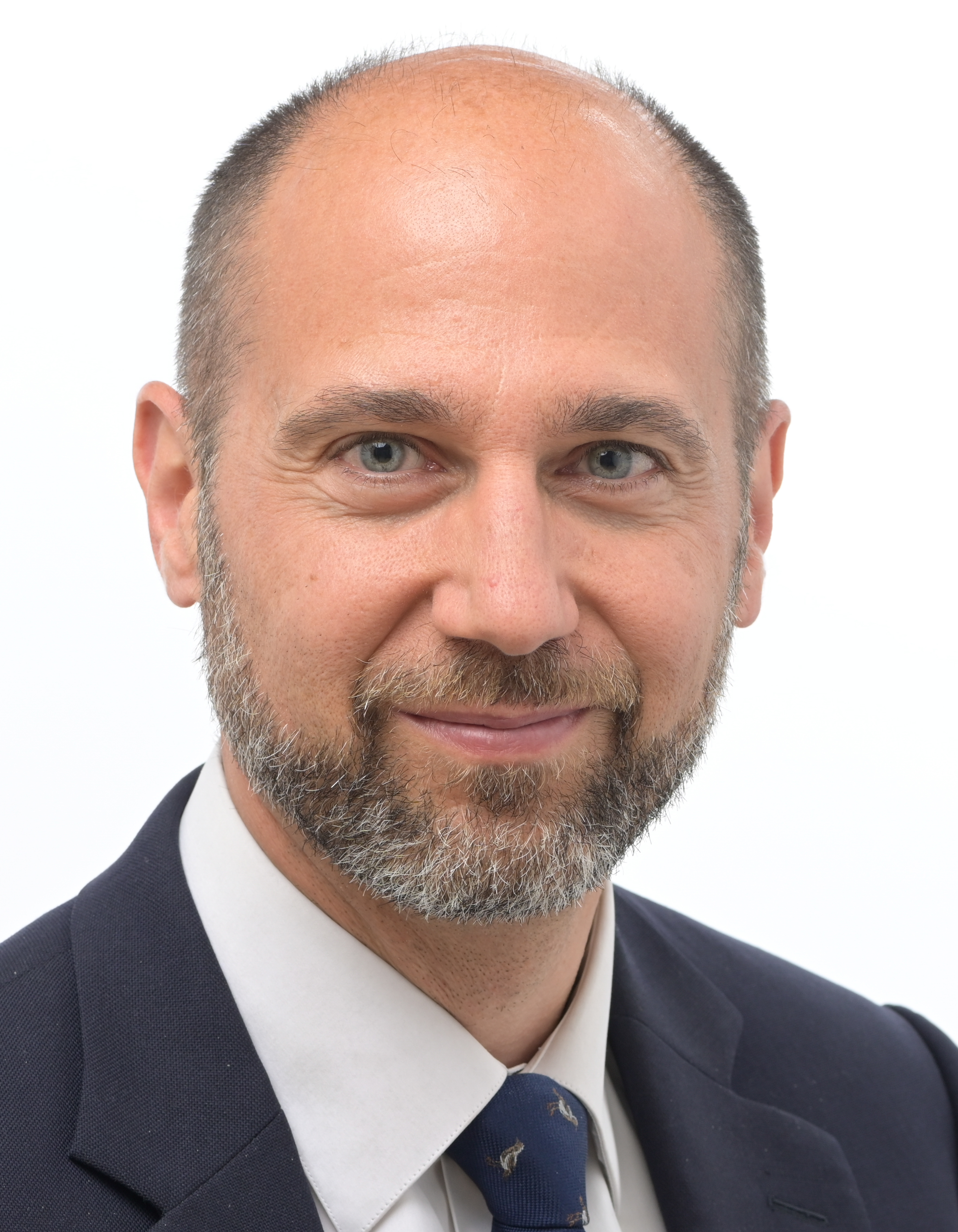

Member of the European Parliament
- Incumbent
- Assumed office 16 July 2024
- Constituency: Spain

Personal details
- Born: Fernando Francisco Navarrete Rojas; 24 January 1976 (age 50)
- Party: People's Party
- Other political affiliations: European People's Party

Fernando Francisco Navarrete Rojas (Spanish pronunciation: [feɾˈnando naβaˈrete]; born 24 January 1976) is a Spanish economist and politician of the People's Party who was elected member of the European Parliament in 2024. He was previously chief of staff to the governor of the Bank of Spain, Pablo Hernández de Cos, and director general of the Official Credit Institute.

== Parliamentary work ==
As the European Parliament's lead rapporteur on the digital euro file, Navarrete has advocated for a significantly scaled-down version of the European Central Bank's proposal.
