= Bancomat (interbank network) =

Italian interbank network and debit card

Bancomat/PagoBancomat
- Operating area: Italy
- Members: 561
- ATMs: 53,000
- Founded: 1983
- Owner: Bancomat S.p.A.
- Website: bancomat.it

Bancomat is an Italian interbank network for cash withdrawals widely used in Italy. It was first introduced in 1983 for use with automated teller machines.

The network is owned by the Rome-based Bancomat, S.p.A. and its cards are issued by Italian banks. The service is only used in Italy and the word “bancomat” is used in Italy as a synonym for automated teller machine.

In 1986, an associated debit card network called PagoBancomat was introduced, which is based on the Bancomat service and is intended for PIN-based POS transactions.

Since the Bancomat network is not used outside Italy, almost every Bancomat/PagoBancomat debit card is co-branded with a multinational service, such as Mastercard, Maestro, Visa, Visa Electron or V Pay, for use abroad.

Old Bancomat logo

A new service called Bancomat Pay was introduced in January 2019. It is intended for electronic payment for online transactions.

In December 2023, Bancomat signed a letter of intent with Spanish mobile payment firm Bizum and Portuguese firm SIBS (which operates the mobile payment service MB Way) to create a partnership in order to develop a unified European payment solution and facilitate the interoperability of their respective mobile payment solutions as a first step. In November 2024, Bancomat, Bizum and SIBS launched the European Payments Alliance (EuroPA), a service allowing users to make instant payments using their mobile phones across the three countries (Italy, Spain and Portugal), and the three firms announced that they are in talks to add more firms to their partnership in order to expand their service in Europe. On 31 March 2025, Bancomat, Bizum and MB Way launched the first instant cross-border transactions.

In February 2026, Bancomat, Bizum, SIBS and Vipps signed a memorandum of understanding with the European Payments Initiative (EPI) with the goal to create an interoperable payment ecosystem. At launch, the payment network will be available in 13 European countries.

== See also ==
- ATM card
- Point of sale
