= Bizum =

Spanish mobile payments system

Bizum S.L.
- Company type: Sociedad limitada
- Industry: Fintech
- Founded: 27 June 2016; 9 years ago
- Headquarters: Calle Francisco Sancha, 12, Madrid, Spain
- Area served: Spain
- Website: bizum.com/es/en/

Bizum is a payment service provider launched in 2016 as an initiative of the Spanish banking system.

== History ==
Constituted on 27 June 2016, Bizum was jointly launched by 27 Spanish banking entities, including CaixaBank, BBVA, and Banco Sabadell. Originally a payment system between people (P2P), it later allowed transfers between people and e-commerce and institutions. Bizum joined the European Mobile Payment Systems Association in 2022.

In 2024, it had 27.6 million active users. In 2024, Bizum also announced plans to launch Bizum Pay in 2025, allowing for NFC payments.

In 2024, Bizum joined forces with Italy's Bancomat Pay and Portugal's MB Way to launch the European Payments Alliance (EuropPA), an agreement that enables inter-operability of payments among clients of Santander, ABANCA and Openbank in Spain, Italy, Portugal, and Andorra starting on 31 March 2025.

== Shareholders ==
In 2022, the shareholding structure was as follows:

- CaixaBank 24%
- Santander 20.91%
- BBVA 18,2%
- Banco Sabadell 11.82%
- Unicaja Banco 4.43%
- Kutxabank 3.61%
- Banco Cooperativo Español (Grupo Caja Rural) 3.56%
- Ibercaja 2.65%
- Banco de Crédito Cooperativo (Grupo Cajamar) 2.64%
- Abanca 2.53%
- Bankinter 2.44%
- Laboral Kutxa 1.2%

== See also ==
- Instant payment
- Blik in Poland
- iDEAL in the Netherlands
- Swish (payment) in Sweden
- TWINT in Switzerland
