= Postbank N.V. =

Defunct Dutch bank

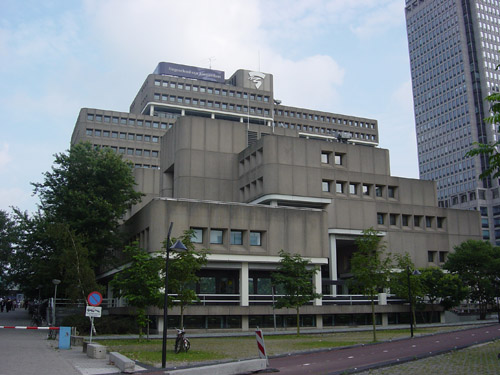
- Leeuwenburg, the former administration office of Postbank N.V. at the Amstel station in Amsterdam
- Type: N.V.
- Industry: Financial services
- Predecessors: Postcheque- en Girodienst; Rijkspostspaarbank
- Founded: 1881; 145 years ago (as Rijkspostspaarbank); 1986 (as Postbank)
- Defunct: February 10, 2009; 17 years ago
- Fate: Merged with ING Bank
- Headquarters: Weesperzijde 190, Amsterdam, Netherlands
- Products: Banking, insurance, mortgages, pensions
- Parent: ING Group
- Website: postbank.nl at the Wayback Machine (archived 2008-10-02)

Postbank N.V. was a large Dutch bank, which went on to become part of ING Group. It had 7.5 million private account holders and was one of the largest providers of financial services in the country. It provided current and savings accounts, loans, mortgages, insurance, investments and pensions.

As opposed to other banks, it had no branches but operated completely through land mail, telephone and online banking, although some operations have traditionally been available through post offices.

== History ==
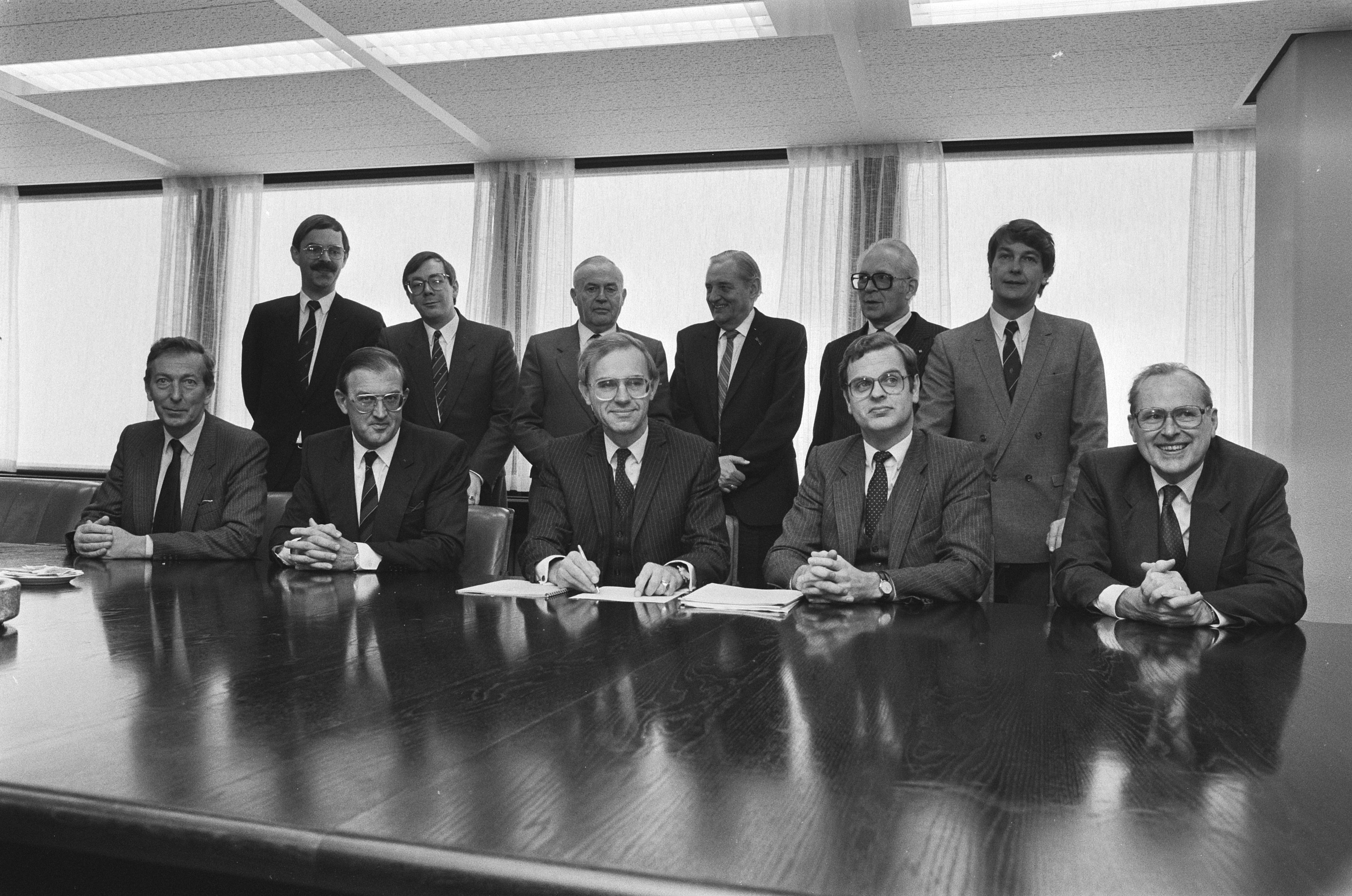
Minister Ruding signing the founding act of the Postbank, 1985

It was founded in 1881 by the national government as the Rijkspostspaarbank (National Postal Savings Bank). In 1986 it was privatised, together with the Postgiro service, as the Postbank.

A merger in 1989 with the NMB Bank led to the creation of NMB Postbank Groep, and a further merger with insurer Nationale Nederlanden in 1991 created the ING Group.

On 16 May 2007, ING Group announced plans to merge its ING Bank subsidiary with Postbank to form a single brand. The new organisation, launched in February 2009, is called ING and has approximately 8.3 million unique private account holders.

== See also ==
- Wim Scherpenhuijsen Rom
- Hans van der Noordaa
- BeaNet
