= Proton (debit card) =

Bank card

- Location: Belgium
- Launched: 1995; 30 years ago
- Discontinued: December 31, 2014; 10 years ago
- Website: proton.be at the Wayback Machine (archived 1999-04-21)

Proton was a stored-value card payment system in Belgium from 1995 until 2014. It was introduced with the goal to replace cash primarily for small transactions around €15. For security, the card was limited to storing 125 EUR of available electronic cash (originally 5,000 BEF).

The card was used for small payments without a pin code or signature, and users ran the same risk as with cash in that if the card was lost the cash value allocated to it would also be lost.

The advantage to merchants was that they could accept payments without the necessity for a bank terminal to be connected to a centralised system for approving the transaction (the transaction was approved by the card itself), and the transaction was very quick.

In August 1998, Proton World International was founded, a joint venture between Banksys, Visa, American Express and EGR. The goal was to promote the Proton technology worldwide. In 2001, the Australian company ERG bought the remaining shares of Proton World and became the sole shareholder, making a $50 million loss two years later by selling it to STMicroelectronics.

Proton saw limited success in Belgium, possibly due to a poor understanding of the system, despite being commonly available on parking meters and pay phones, and within convenience stores. Despite this, the system was also implemented in other countries such as Chipknip in the Netherlands, and was considered for other markets such as Australia.

Security was based on the message authentication code.

The system was retired on 31 December 2014. Customers are requested to offload the charged amount back onto their bank account before the expiration date.
