= Peer-to-peer (disambiguation) =

Peer-to-peer computing or networking is a distributed application architecture that partitions tasks or workloads between peers.

Peer-to-peer may also refer to:

== Economics ==
- Peer-to-peer banking
- Peer-to-peer carsharing
- Peer-to-peer lending
- Peer-to-peer economy, another name for the sharing economy

== Other uses ==
- Peer-to-peer file sharing
- Social peer-to-peer processes
  - P2P economic system

== See also ==
- P2P (disambiguation)
- Anonymous P2P systems in which participants remain anonymous
- Peer production
- Private peer-to-peer
