= Digital wallet =

Electronic wallet

A digital wallet, also known as an e-wallet or mobile wallet, is an electronic device, online service, or software program that allows one party to make electronic transactions with another party by exchanging digital currency units for goods and services. This can include purchasing items either online or at the point of sale in a brick-and-mortar store, either using a smartphone or other mobile device to make a mobile payment or (for online buying only) using a laptop or other personal computer. Money can be deposited in the digital wallet prior to any such transactions; alternatively, an individual's bank account can be linked to the digital wallet. Users may also have their driver's license, health card, loyalty card(s) and other ID documents stored within the wallet. The credentials can be passed to a merchant's terminal wirelessly via near field communication (NFC).

Increasingly, digital wallets are being made not just for basic financial transactions but to also authenticate the holder's credentials. For example, a digital wallet could verify the age of the buyer to the store while purchasing alcohol. The system has already gained popularity in Japan, where digital wallets are known as "wallet mobiles". In addition, a few US states have adapted digital driver's licenses and state IDs to be added to digital wallet instead of the physical card and it can be used at selected Transportation Security Administration checkpoints at airports, banking or enterprise. As of January 2025 the UK government is launching a GOV.UK wallet which will allow users to hold digital versions of various government documents within a mobile phone.

A cryptocurrency wallet is a digital wallet where private keys are stored for cryptocurrencies like bitcoin.

== Technology ==
A digital wallet has both a software and information component. Secure and fair electronic payment systems are an important issue. The software provides security and encryption for the personal information and for the actual transaction. Typically, digital wallets are stored on the client side and are easily self-maintained and fully compatible with most e-commerce websites. A server-side digital wallet, also known as a thin wallet, is one that an organization creates for and about its members and maintains on its servers. Server-side digital wallets are gaining popularity among major retailers due to the security, efficiency, and added utility it provides to the end-user, which increases their satisfaction of their overall purchase. The information component is basically a database of user-input information. This information consists of a user's shipping address, billing address, payment methods (including credit card numbers, expiry dates, and security numbers), and other information.

Digital wallets are composed of both digital wallet devices and digital wallet systems. There are dedicated digital wallet devices such as the biometric wallet by Dunhill, a physical device that holds cash and cards along with a Bluetooth mobile connection. Presently there are further explorations for smartphones with NFC digital wallet capabilities, such as smartphones utilizing Google's Android and Apple's iOS operating systems to power wallets such as Google Wallet and Apple Pay.

Digital wallet systems enable the widespread use of digital wallet transactions among various retail vendors in the form of mobile payments systems and digital wallet applications. The M-PESA mobile payments system and microfinancing service has widespread use in Kenya and Tanzania, while the MasterCard PayPass application has been adopted by a number of vendors in the U.S. and worldwide.

Amazon India and Flipkart introduced their own digital wallet. A 2025 systematic review found that digital wallet and mobile payment technologies play a significant role in expanding financial inclusion by lowering access barriers and improving the availability of financial services for underserved populations.

== European Payments Initiative ==
With the acquisition of iDEAL, European Payments Initiative Company has announced that it will create an all European digital wallet.

== See also ==
- Online wallet
- Universal credit card
