= Unzer =

Unzer is a surname. Notable people with the surname include:

- Johann August Unzer (1727–1799), German physician
- Johanna Charlotte Unzer (1724–1782), German writer
