= P2P =

P2P may refer to:

- Pay-to-play, where money is exchanged for services
- Peer-to-peer, a distributed application architecture in computing or networking
  - List of P2P protocols
- Phenylacetone, an organic compound commonly known as P2P
- Point-to-point (telecommunications), a communications connection between two communication endpoints or nodes
- Pollen Street Secured Lending, formerly P2P Global Investments, a British investment trust
- Premium Point-to-Point Bus Service, in the Philippines
- Procure-to-pay, software systems for procurement business processes
- Purchase-to-pay, business process in procurement
- Social peer-to-peer processes, interactions with a peer-to-peer dynamic

== See also ==
- Peer-to-peer (disambiguation)
- Point-to-point (disambiguation)
- People to People Student Ambassador Program, a cultural and educational travel program for students
- Pier to Pub, an Australian open water swimming race
