= IDEAL =

Dutch e-commerce payment system

iDEAL
- Developers: Currence (Payconiq, ABN AMRO, Friesland Bank, ING Bank, Knab, Rabobank, Triodos Bank, Van Lanschot, De Volksbank)
- Release: 2005
- Website: www.ideal.nl

iDEAL is an e-commerce payment system used for online banking in the Netherlands. Previously controlled by the Dutch e-commerce organization Currence since 2006, the company became owned by the European Payments Initiative (EPI) from October 2023.

It is an online payment method that enables consumers to pay online through their own bank. In addition to online merchants, other organisations that are not part of the e-commerce market also offer iDEAL.

== History ==
The system was conceived by the Dutch banks ABN Amro, ING Bank, Postbank N.V. and Rabobank, to develop a single system for online payments that could be used by all banks.

The payment platform was opened to consumers in October 2005.

In 2006, the consortium moved the iDEAL brand to the Dutch banking organization Currence. Nine years after claiming to be responsible for 54% of the country's online payments, iDEAL reported having 70% of this market in 2023.

In the same year, the European Payments Initiative acquired iDEAL and Payconiq International, as well as new shareholders, for the upcoming launch of its instant payment solution. iDEAL is to become a European payment account-to-account (A2A) instant payment scheme and a multi-faceted digital wallet.

EPI will initially enable person-to-person (P2P) and person-to-professional (P2Pro) payments, followed by online and mobile shopping payments and then point-of-sale payments. A comprehensive range of transaction types will be supported, including one-off payments, subscriptions, installments, payments upon delivery and reservations. Additionally, value-added services will be incorporated into the solution over time, including responsible ‘Buy Now, Pay Later’ (BNPL) financing, digital identity features and integration of merchant loyalty programmes.

=== Wero ===
The European Payments Initiative (EPI) announced in 2023 that iDEAL will be replaced by its Wero payment service. Wero is launched in Germany, France and Belgium in mid-2024 as a P2P payment solution, but the service will offer e-commerce/m-commerce payments from mid-2025.

In October 2025, EPI presented a phased migration plan from iDEAL into Wero, that would span from early 2026 until the end of 2027. Unlike iDEAL, Wero is usable exclusively through Google or Apple's ecosystem.

== Transaction statistics ==
The number of transfers processed:

Annual payments
Year	Transactions
2006	4.4 million
2007	14.9 million
2008	27.8 million
2009	45.4 million
2010	68.8 million
2011	93.9 million
2012	117.2 million
2013	142.5 million
2014	180.2 million
2015	222.0 million
2016	282.6 million
2017	378.1 million
2018	523.8 million
2019	666.9 million
2020	890.3 million
2021	1.14 billion

== See also ==
- Bizum
- Swish (payment)
- TWINT
- Payment Service Provider
- POLi Payments
