= BeaNet =

BeaNet (abbreviation of Betaalautomaten Netwerk, Dutch for payment terminal network) was a Dutch system and organization for electronic payments, which was founded in 1988.

== Adoption ==
In March 1990, Esso included the possibility to pay with BeaNet. In January 1992, Albert Heijn was the first large supermarket in the Netherlands that adopted the usage of BeaNet.

== Criticism ==
Yvonne van Rooy, the staatssecretaris of economic affairs in the Third Lubbers cabinet, wanted to get rid of the monopolistic position of BeaNet in 1992.

== Merger ==
In 1993, a merger was announced between BeaNet, Bankgirocentrale and Eurocard Nederland. In 1994, they formed Interpay.

== See also ==
- Chipknip
