= Comdirect Bank =

German direct bank

Comdirect Bank Aktiengesellschaft

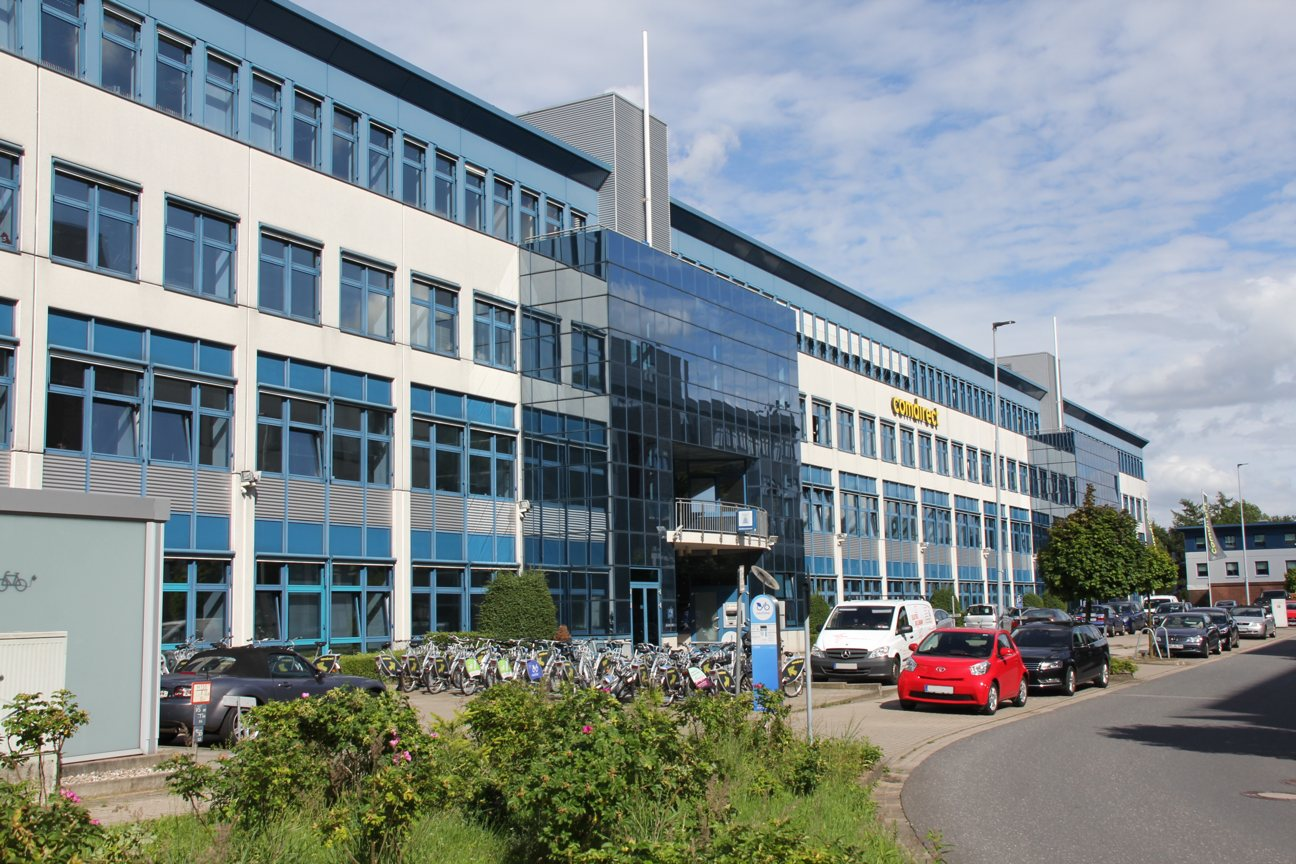
- Headquarters of the Comdirect Bank
- Type: Public
- Traded as: FWB: COM
- ISIN: DE0005428007
- Industry: Financial services
- Founded: 1994; 32 years ago
- Founder: Commerzbank
- Defunct: November 1, 2020
- Headquarters: Quickborn, Germany
- Area served: Germany
- Key people: Frauke Hegemann (CEO); Jochen Sutor (chairman of the Supervisory Board)
- Products: Retail banking, Savings, Securities, Asset management
- Operating income: ▼€70.723 million (2018)
- Net income: ▼€50.369 million (2018)
- Total equity: ▼€634 million (2018)
- Number of employees: 1,534 (2018)
- Parent: Commerzbank (82%)
- Subsidiaries: Onvista
- Website: comdirect.de

Comdirect Bank Aktiengesellschaft was the third-largest German direct bank and was based in Quickborn, Schleswig-Holstein. Founded by Commerzbank in 1994, the company went public in 2000. Commerzbank integrated the company on November 1, 2020.

== History ==
Previous logo.

=== Foundation ===
In 1994, Commerzbank desired to expand its business and customer base and therefore decided to establish a direct bank. Commerzbank founded Comdirect, which was registered in December 1994 as a private limited company. It began operations with 50 employees and 50 million Deutsche Marks in equity in January 1995. The company positioned itself not as a traditional direct bank, but instead as a universal bank for private customers with a wide range of specialized products. One of the first products of Comdirect Bank was a money market account. Securities trading became also one of its top priorities.

=== Public offering ===
Within the first few months, Comdirect Bank gained tens of thousands of customers. In the late 1990s, Comdirect Bank expanded to other European countries. Commerzbank and Deutsche Telekom agreed on the cooperation of their subsidiaries, Comdirect Bank and T-Online International. Comdirect Bank became a public company in November 1999 and went public in June 2000. Commerzbank sold a minority stake in the company. The stock was oversubscribed several times and later became part of the Nemax 50 index and the Prime Standard of Frankfurt Stock Exchange. The proceeds of the initial public offering were used to build, for example, the investment banking of Comdirect Bank. The company doubled its workforce to cope with the growing number of customers.

=== Consolidation ===
In 2000, the burst of the dot-com bubble hit the financial industry. Comdirect Bank was also affected and, as a result, growth slowed. After several successful years, the bank announced losses in 2001. As Comdirect Bank fell into financial difficulties, the board launched a savings program. At the end of 2001, Comdirect Bank announced a focus on Germany and the United Kingdom. The company put its loss-making branches up for disposal; the subsidiaries in France and Italy were sold and closed. Finally, in 2004, Comdirect Bank sold its British subsidiary, too.

From then on, Comdirect Bank exclusively focused on its home market in Germany. The company accelerated the expansion of its product range and, in particular, focused more about customer advisory services. The new strategy stabilized the business. The first dividend was distributed in 2004 and, in 2005, the German retail banking of American Express was acquired, which helped to grow the customer base significantly.

To profit more from the performance of Comdirect Bank, Commerzbank increased its investment to almost 80% in June 2005. The group purchased the remaining share from T-Online International.

=== Acquisitions ===
Even during the 2008 financial crisis, the business remained stable; Comdirect Bank profited from the increase in transactions in securities trading.

In 2009, Comdirect Bank acquired the European Bank for Financial Services (EBASE) from Commerzbank, doubling the number of managed securities accounts. At the same time, the bank extended its position in financial services and asset management. During the following years, Comdirect Bank repositioned the European Bank for Financial Services as a business-to-business bank. In July 2018, Comdirect Bank agreed to sell EBASE to London-based financial technology provider FNZ Group, to focus more on its core business, and completed the sale in July 2019.

In 2016, Comdirect Bank announced the acquisition of the Onvista Group. Both Onvista Bank and Onvista Media, operator of a high-reach financial portal, became part of Comdirect Bank. With this investment, Comdirect Bank strengthened its securities trading and financial information business at the same time. While Onvista Bank merged with Comdirect Bank, Onvista Media continued operations as a subsidiary.

=== Digitalization ===
In later years, Comdirect Bank invested heavily in digital technologies. For example, in 2010, the company published the first online banking app with support for accounts from other institutions. In 2015, it launched the "startup garage" for financial technology startups. The company was the first bank in Germany to publish an Amazon Alexa skill and later added support for Google Home. In 2017, Comdirect Bank launched a robo-advisor named Cominvest.

In late 2019, Commerzbank entered into talks with Petrus Advisers to buy its 7.5% stake in Comdirect and take over the entire online bank.

=== Merger with Commerzbank ===
In early 2020, Commerzbank successfully completed the acquisition of the remaining shares of Comdirect Bank, leading to a squeeze-out of the minority shareholders. The legal merger of Comdirect Bank AG into Commerzbank AG was finalized in November 2020. Since then, Comdirect Bank has no longer existed as an independent legal entity but has been continued as a primary brand of Commerzbank.

Under this two-brand strategy, Commerzbank continues to offer digital banking and brokerage services under the "Comdirect" name. While the technical systems and the banking license were consolidated, the product portfolio and the specific online portal remain active for both existing and new customers.

== Structure ==
Onvista Media is a subsidiary of Comdirect bank in Germany.

== Products ==
Comdirect Bank offers current accounts, online brokerage and several types of credits and loans.

== Responsibility ==
In 2009, Comdirect Bank and the Stuttgart Stock Exchange founded the Stiftung Rechnen, a non-profit foundation with a registered office in Hamburg and headquarters in Quickborn. Its primary goal is to support knowledge of mathematics, with a focus on young people, in order to encourage joy in numbers and calculation. Johanna Wanka, former Federal Minister of Education and Research, is the patron of the Stiftung Rechnen; Christian Rach, a star-rated chef and author, is one of its prominent ambassadors.

== Controversies ==
Comdirect Bank accidentally reported 200 million euros to an account of a customer in 2012. The bank justified the error with a technical problem in the sale of funds, which could not be seen before. After the reversal, there was a negative balance, which caused lending rates that Comdirect Bank had to reimburse.

In 2016, an error occurred after a software update, leading to a small number of customers of the Comdirect Bank being able to view the account balances of other customers for a very short time. However, third parties were not able to do wire transfers. Though there was no financial or material damage, the company regretted the mistake, apologized to all affected customers and informed them about the extent of third-party access.

Since 2017, the bank has been targeted by activist investor Petrus Advisers. The investor is questioning the cost structure (cost-income-ratio is over 70%), the governance, incentive structure, and the management quality among other things.

== See also ==
- List of banks in Germany
