= Bancontact Payconiq Company =

Belgian financial services company (e. 2018)

Bancontact Company
- Industry: Financial services
- Predecessors: Bancontact Payconiq Company, Belgium
- Founded: 2018
- Headquarters: Brussels, Belgium
- Key people: Nathalie Vandepeute (CEO)
- Products: Mobile applications
- Website: bancontact.com

Logo of Bancontact/MisterCash, the former payment product

Bancontact Company is a Belgian company that was founded in 2018 as the merger of Bancontact Company and Payconiq Belgium. The company is the Belgian market leader in financial services. Company headquarters are in Brussels, Belgium.

== History ==
In March 2018 the companies declared their intention to merge with each other. The merger was finalized in July. Nathalie Vandepeute became the CEO.

In August, the company got a capital injection from its five major shareholders from 17 to more than 32 million euros.

In January 2019 the company merged its payment applications called "Bancontact" and "Payconiq" into an app called "Payconiq by Bancontact". The app is supported by 20 Belgian banks and 290,000 Belgian stores. Next to the app, the company issues debit cards under the "Bancontact" branding that can be used in physical stores and online. Bancontact Payconiq is a member of the European Mobile Payment Systems Association.

Since March 2026 the company has been renamed to Bancontact Company.
