= EquensWorldline =

European payment processing company

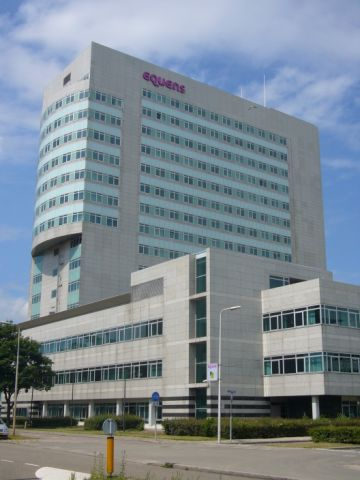
- Equens building in Utrecht
- Predecessor: Interpay, Transaktionsinstitut für Zahlungsverkehrsdienstleistungen AG
- Founded: 2006 as equens, 2016 as equensWorldline
- Area served: Single Euro Payments Area
- Website: worldline.com/financial-institutions

equensWorldline SE (formerly Equens) is a payment card and payment processor headquartered in Utrecht, Netherlands which serves the European market. Since 2019, it has been a wholly owned subsidiary of Worldline. As of 2020, equensWorldline had additional branch offices in Belgium, Finland, France, Germany, Italy, Luxembourg and sales representatives in the UK.

== History ==
Former logo of Equens

Equens was established in 2006 as Europe's first pan-European payment processor. This followed the merger of Europe's two largest payment processors: Interpay from The Netherlands and the Transaktionsinstitut für Zahlungsverkehrsdienstleistungen AG from Germany.

In July 2008, Equens SE was formed as Societas Europaea, initially operating as a holding company. In September 2008, Equens SE extended its activities to Italia, by forming Equens Italia, a 50:50 joint venture with Italy's Istituto Centrale delle Banche Popolari Italiane. In 2011, Equens Italia became a wholly owned subsidiary of Equens SE, and in 2013 it turned into a permanent establishment of Equens.

In 2016, equensWorldline was created, following the merger between Equens SE and Financial Services and Merchant Services activities of Worldline in the Benelux and Germany, and to a lesser extent France

Initially, Worldline hold 63.6% of the shares, the rest (36.4%) being held by Dutch, German and Italian banks. However, Worldline had a call option on the minority shares, which it exercised in 2019, hence becoming the sole owner of equensWorldline.
