= European Payments Initiative =

Pan-European payment system

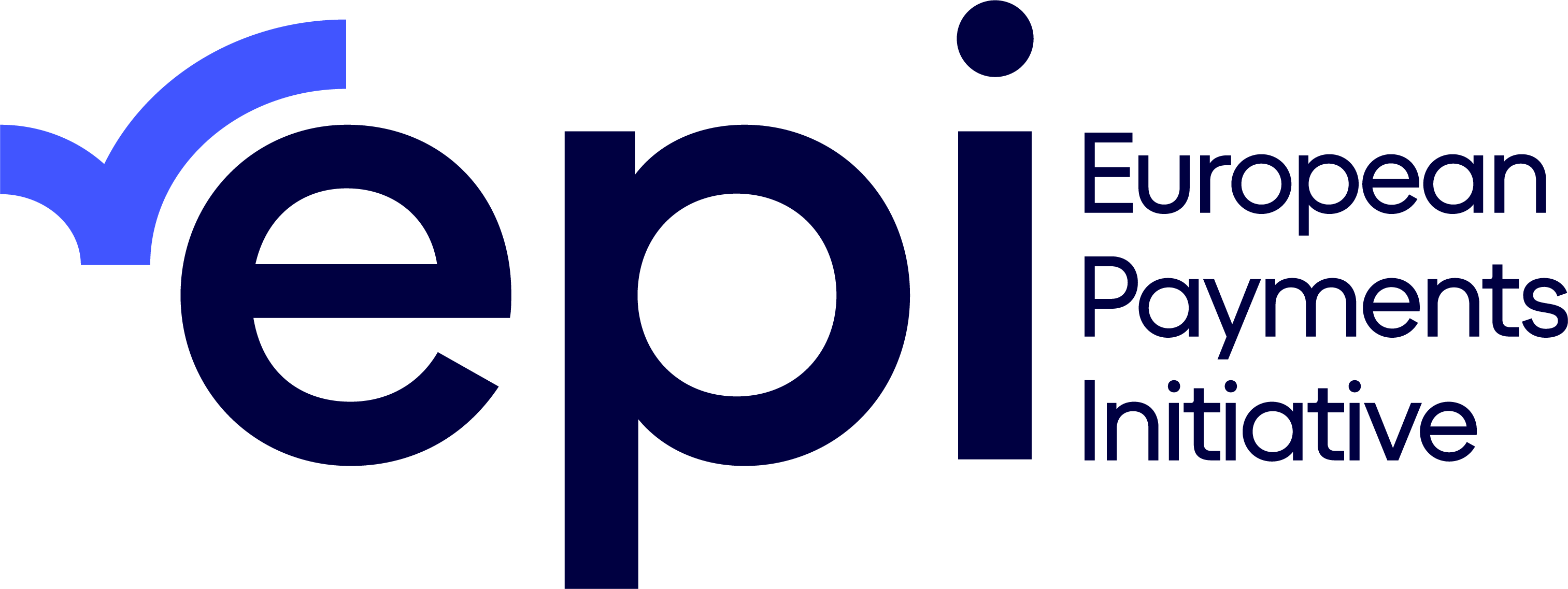
- Operating area: Single Euro Payments Area
- Members: 20 major European banks
- Founded: 2020; 6 years ago
- Owner: EPI Company SE (Societas Europaea)
- Website: www.epicompany.eu

The European Payments Initiative (EPI), previously known as the Pan-European Payments System Initiative (PEPSI), is a unified digital payment service launched in 2020 and backed by sixteen founding European banks and payment service providers. Its aim is to allow European consumers and merchants to make next-generation payments for all types of person-to-person transfers and retail transactions via a digital wallet, called Wero. Wero is based on instant account-to-account payments and will eliminate intermediaries in the payment chain and associated costs.

It is supported by the European Commission, and currently comprises fourteen major European banks and two acquirers (including all the major French banks and Deutsche Bank in Germany). In early 2026, the movement to reduce dependence, and thus geopolitical vulnerability, on US-based Visa and Mastercard accelerated. The European Central Bank also plans to introduce the digital euro by 2029.

== First attempt ==
The EPI scheme is not the first attempt to set up a European interbank payment and card network. The Monnet Project was initiated in 2008 by around twenty European banks, but abandoned in 2012.

The European Payments initiative was first suggested as a response to threats to the independence of international financial service infrastructure which could force the American companies Mastercard and Visa to cut off access to their networks in Europe. These threats led European institutions to launch a second initiative to create an independent payment system.

== Members and participants ==
The EPI project is backed by the European Commission. It has 16 founding shareholders based in Belgium, France, Germany and the Netherlands: ABN Amro, Belfius, Crédit Mutuel, BNP Paribas, Groupe BPCE, Crédit Agricole, Deutsche Bank, Sparkassen-Finanzgruppe, DZ Bank, ING Group, KBC Bank, La Banque Postale, Nexi, Rabobank, Société Générale, Worldline.

== Partnerships ==
On 23 June 2025, EPI and the European Payments Alliance (EuroPA) announced that they will cooperate and create a partnership in order to explore solutions for developing a cross-border digital payments solution aimed at improving payment interoperability within Europe. Such a partnership would cover 15 European countries (with a combined population of around 382 million inhabitants, amounting to 84% of the European Union and Norway, and this interconnection of existing payment solutions could provide the EU with a path towards sovereignty and independence from the US in terms of payment solutions (a market dominated by US payment card services firms like Visa; Mastercard and American Express). In September 2025, EuroPA and EPI reaffirmed their intention to interconnect their respective payment solutions and announced the finalization of a feasibility study by December 2025.

== Infrastructure ==
The EPI system is based on the SEPA instant credit transfer (SCT Inst) scheme, allowing it to capitalise on existing infrastructures such as the Eurosystem's TARGET Instant Payment Settlement (TIPS). Wero, with its payment network, digital wallet and international instant payments scheme, aims to replace European domestic solutions such as Swish, iDEAL, Bizum and Blik. QR code payments will be available for both money transfers and payments, with plans for more payment options in the future.

Wero is available both through the mobile apps of most member banks or, for some banks, via a standalone Wero app. It offers currency conversion throughout Europe.

=== Wero ===
The European Payments Initiative (EPI) announced its intention to launch Wero, its wallet-based payment method in Germany in mid-2024, followed by France and Belgium later in that year and the Netherlands in 2025. The rest of Europe will follow in subsequent years.

Wero initially allows person-to-person (P2P) and person-to-professional (P2Pro) payments, which will be followed by online and mobile shopping payments and then point-of-sale payments. It will offer a range of transaction types, including one-off payments, subscriptions, installments, payments upon delivery and reservations.

Value-added services will be incorporated into the solution over time, including responsible ‘Buy Now, Pay Later’ (BNPL) financing, digital identity features (allowing the tracking of consumers in every EU country and the blocking of payments when needed) and the integration of merchant loyalty programmes.

In October 2024, seven French banks deployed Wero. It replaces Paylib for them.

=== iDEAL & Payconiq ===
EPI Company acquired the payment providers Currence iDEAL BV and Payconiq International SA in October 2023. The payment methods iDEAL in the Netherlands, Payconiq in Luxembourg and Payconiq by Bancontact in Belgium are offerings in their local markets, but set to be fully integrated into Wero in 2026–2027.

== See also ==
- Euro Alliance of Payment Schemes, a previous failed European attempt to unify European payment systems
- Instant payment
- ECB digital euro project
