= Friesland Bank =

Friesland Bank N.V.
- Company type: Private
- Industry: Banking
- Founded: 1913
- Headquarters: Leeuwarden, Netherlands
- Products: Banking; Insurance
- Revenue: € 379.7 million (2006)
- Net income: € 106.9 million (2006)
- Number of employees: 1,000
- Website: www.frieslandbank.nl

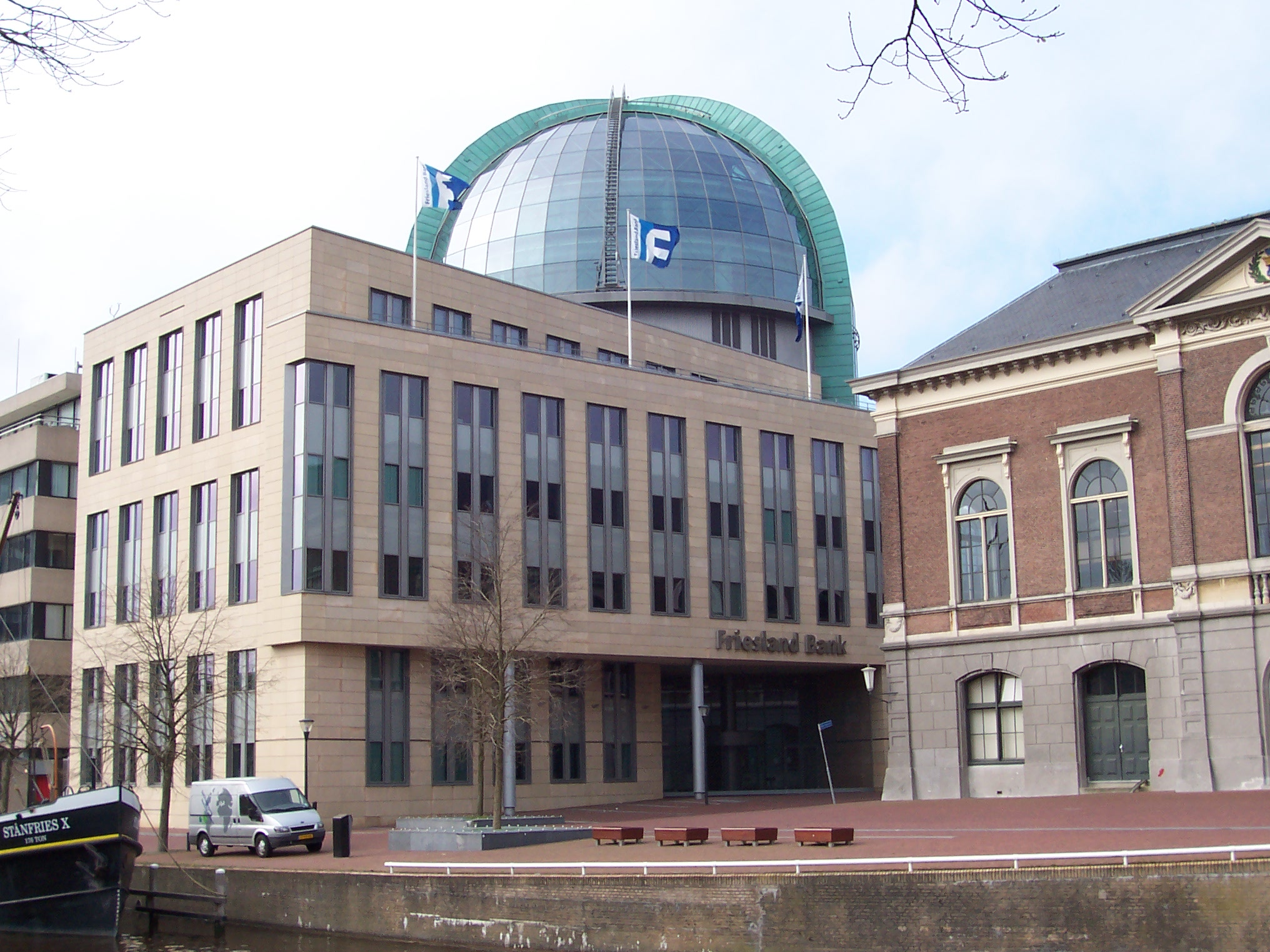
Friesland Bank

Friesland Bank was a Dutch retail bank originally focusing on the northern provinces of the Netherlands, Friesland, Groningen, Drenthe, Overijssel, and North Holland. On 2 April 2012 Friesland Bank announced that it would become a subsidiary of Rabobank after a merger plan with NIBC was blocked by De Nederlandse Bank. This ended the era of a 100-year-old regional bank for the Northern Netherlands. In connection with the revocation of Friesland Bank N.V.'s banking license as of December 15, 2014, the name of Friesland Bank N.V. was changed to Friesland Zekerheden Maatschappij N.V.

== History ==
Founded in 1913 as the Coöperatieve Zuivelbank (Co-operative Dairy bank), it affiliated with "Raiffeisenbank". However, as Raiffeisenbank merged with the Boerenleenbank to form Rabobank, the Coöperatieve Zuivelbank was once again fully independent. In 1970, the company changed its name to Friesland Bank. Originally operating only in Friesland itself, Friesland Bank started opening branches in the northern Netherlands in the 1990s.

In 2011, the bank was in dire straits, suffering a loss of € 350 million, partly as a result of an extra write-down on the interest in Van Lanschot and loan losses. Van Lanschot's planned sales plans were not realised. The solvency ratios fell below the established standards. The BIS ratio fell to 6.1%, which is far below the standard of 8% and the Tier1 ratio more than halved to 4.2%.

== See also ==
- List of banks in the Netherlands
