= Mobile commerce =

Commerce via hand held devices

The term mobile commerce was originally coined in 1997 by Kevin Duffey at the launch of the Global Mobile Commerce Forum, to mean "the delivery of electronic commerce capabilities directly into the consumer’s hand, anywhere, via Wireless technology." Some choose to think of mobile commerce as meaning "a retail outlet in your customer’s pocket."

== History ==
The Global Mobile Commerce Forum, which came to include over 100 organisations, had its fully minuted launch in London on 10 November 1997. Kevin Duffey was elected Executive Chairman at the first meeting in November 1997. The meeting was opened by Dr Mike Short, former chairman of the GSM Association, with the very first forecasts for mobile commerce from Kevin Duffey (Group Telecoms Director of Logica) and Tom Alexander (later CEO of Virgin Mobile and then of Orange). Over 100 companies joined the Forum within a year, a number of them forming mobile commerce teams of their own, e.g. MasterCard and Motorola. Among these one hundred companies, the first two were Logica and Cellnet (which later became O2). Member organisations such as Nokia, Apple, Alcatel, and Vodafone began a series of trials and collaborations.

Mobile commerce services were first delivered in 1997, when the first two mobile-phone-enabled Coca-Cola vending machines were installed in the Helsinki area in Finland. The machines accepted payment via SMS text messages. This work evolved into several new mobile applications, such as the first mobile phone-based banking service launched in 1997 by Merita Bank of Finland, also using SMS. Finnair mobile check-in was also a major milestone, first introduced in 2001.

The m-Commerce server developed in late 1997 by Kevin Duffey and Andrew Tobin at Logica won the 1998 Financial Times award for "most innovative mobile product," in a solution implemented with De La Rue, Motorola and Logica. The Financial Times commended the solution for "turning mobile commerce into a reality." The trademark for m-Commerce was filed on 7 April 2008.

In 1998, the first sales of digital content as downloads to mobile phones were made possible when the first commercial downloadable ringtones were launched in Finland by Radiolinja (now part of Elisa Oyj).

Two major national commercial platforms for mobile commerce were launched in 1999: Smart Money in the Philippines and NTT DoCoMo's I-Mode Internet service in Japan. I-Mode offered a revenue-sharing plan where NTT DoCoMo kept 9 per cent of the fee users paid for content, and returned 91 percent to the content owner.

Mobile-commerce-related services spread rapidly in the early 2000s. Norway launched mobile parking payments. Austria offered train ticketing via mobile devices. Japan offered mobile purchases of airline tickets.

In April 2002, building on the work of the Global Mobile Commerce Forum (GMCF), the European Telecommunications Standards Institute (ETSI) appointed Joachim Hoffmann of Motorola to develop official standards for mobile commerce. In appointing Mr Hoffman, ETSI quoted industry analysts as predicting "that m-commerce is poised for such an exponential growth over the next few years that could reach US$200 billion by 2004".

As of 2008, UCL Computer Science and Peter J. Bentley demonstrated the potential for medical applications on mobile devices.

In order to exploit the potential mobile commerce market, mobile phone manufacturers such as Nokia, Ericsson, Motorola, and Qualcomm are working with carriers such as AT&T Wireless and Sprint to develop WAP-enabled smartphones. Smartphones offer fax, e-mail, and phone capabilities.

"Profitability for device vendors and carriers hinges on high-end mobile devices and the accompanying killer applications," said Burchett. Perennial early adopters, such as the youth market, which are the least price sensitive, as well as more open to premium mobile content and applications, must also be a key target for device vendors.

Since the launch of the iPhone in 2007, mobile commerce has moved away from SMS systems and into actual applications. SMS has significant security vulnerabilities and congestion problems, even though it is widely available and accessible. In addition, improvements in the capabilities of modern mobile devices make it prudent to place more of the resource burden on the mobile device.

Unlike online banking using bank websites, mobile banking allows a smaller number of operations based on short messages or applications installed on mobile devices. At present, it is estimated that by 2022, the number of customers adopting mobile banking will increase to 2 billion, and banks are investing more and more in improving mobile applications to improve security and customer satisfaction.

More recently, brick and mortar business owners, and big-box retailers in particular, have made an effort to take advantage of mobile commerce by utilizing a number of mobile capabilities such as location-based services, barcode scanning, and push notifications to improve the customer experience of shopping in physical stores. By creating what is referred to as a 'bricks & clicks' environment, physical retailers can allow customers to access the common benefits of shopping online (such as product reviews, information, and coupons) while still shopping in the physical store. This is seen as a bridge between the gap created by e-commerce and in-store shopping, and is being utilized by physical retailers as a way to compete with the lower prices typically seen through online retailers. By midsummer 2013, "omnichannel" retailers (those with significant e-commerce and in-store sales) were seeing between 25% and 30% of traffic to their online properties originating from mobile devices. Some other pure play/online-only retail sites (especially those in the travel category) as well as flash sales sites and deal sites were seeing between 40% and 50% of traffic (and sometimes significantly more) originate from mobile devices.

Platforms such as Wix, Dorik, and Duda are cloud-based website builders that enable businesses to create mobile-optimized storefronts without coding expertise. These services provide no‑code, template‑driven e-commerce site builders with AI tools.

The Google Wallet Mobile App launched in September 2011 and the m-Commerce joint venture formed in June 2011 between Vodafone, O2, Orange and T-Mobile are recent developments of note. Reflecting the importance of m-Commerce, in April 2012 the Competition Commissioner of the European Commission ordered an in-depth investigation of the m-Commerce joint venture between Vodafone, O2, Orange and T-Mobile. A recent survey states that 2012, 41% of smartphone customers have purchased retail products with their mobile devices.

== Products and services available ==
=== Mobile money transfer ===
In Kenya money transfer is mainly done through the use of mobile phones. This was an initiative of a multimillion-shillings company in Kenya named Safaricom. Currently, the companies involved are Safaricom and Airtel. Mobile money transfer services in Kenya are now provided by the two companies under the names M-PESA and Airtel Money respectively.

A similar system called MobilePay has been operated by Danske Bank in Denmark since 2013. It gained considerable popularity with about 1.6 million users by mid-2015. Another similar system called Vipps was introduced in Norway in 2015.

A mobile automated teller machine (ATM) is a special type of ATM. Most ATMs are usually stationary, and they're often found attached to the side of financial institutions, in stores, and in malls. A mobile ATM, on the other hand, is meant to be moved from location to location. This type of ATM is often found at special events for which ATM service is only needed temporarily. For example, they may be found at carnivals, fairs, and parades. They may also be used at seminars and workshops where no regular ATM is nearby.

Mobile ATMs are usually self-contained units that don't need a building or enclosure. Usually, a mobile ATM can be placed in just about any location and can transmit transaction information wirelessly, so there's no need to have a phone line handy. Mobile ATMs may, however, require access to an electrical source, though there are some capable of running on alternative sources of power. Often, these units are constructed of weather-resistant materials, so they can be used in practically any type of weather. Additionally, these machines typically have internal heating and air conditioning units that help keep them functional despite the temperature of the environment.ion of mobile money services for the unbanked, operators are now looking for efficient ways to roll out and manage distribution networks that can support cash-in and cash-out. Unlike traditional ATMs, sicap Mobile ATMs have been specially engineered to connect to mobile money platforms and provide bank-grade ATM quality. In Hungary, Vodafone allows cash or bank card payments for monthly phone bills. The Hungarian market is one where direct debits are not standard practice, so the facility eases the burden of queuing for the postpaid half of Vodafone's subscriber base in Hungary.

=== Mobile ticketing ===
Tickets can be sent to mobile phones using a variety of technologies. Users are then able to use their tickets immediately, by presenting their mobile phone at the ticket check as a digital boarding pass. Most numbers of users are now moving towards this technology. The best example would be IRCTC where the ticket comes as an SMS to users. New technology such as RFID can now be used to directly provide a single association digital ticket via the mobile device hardware associated with relevant software.

=== Mobile vouchers, coupons and loyalty cards ===
Mobile ticketing technology can also be used for the distribution of vouchers, coupons, and loyalty cards. These items are represented by a virtual token that is sent to the mobile phone. A customer presenting a mobile phone with one of these tokens at the point of sale receives the same benefits as if they had the traditional token. Stores may send coupons to customers using location-based services to determine when the customer is nearby. Using a connected device and the networking effect can also allow for gamification within the shopping experience.

=== Content purchase and delivery ===
Currently, mobile content purchase and delivery mainly consist of the sale of ring-tones, wallpapers, apps, and games for mobile phones. The convergence of mobile phones, portable audio players, and video players into a single device is increasing the purchase and delivery of full-length music tracks and videos. The download speeds available with 4G networks make it possible to buy a movie on a mobile device in a couple of seconds.

=== Location-based services ===
The location of the mobile phone user is an important piece of information used during mobile commerce or m-commerce transactions. Knowing the location of the user allows for location-based services such as:

- Local discount offers
- Local weather
- Tracking and monitoring of people
- Data-driven mashups targeting at a hyper-local level

=== Information services ===
A wide variety of information services can be delivered to mobile phone users in much the same way as it is delivered to PCs. These services include:

- News
- Sales quotes
- Sports scores
- Financial records
- Traffic reporting
- Emergency Alerts
- Location Based Notifications

Customized traffic information, based on a user's actual travel patterns, can be sent to a mobile device. This customized data is more useful than a generic traffic-report broadcast but was impractical before the invention of modern mobile devices due to the bandwidth requirements.

=== Mobile banking ===
Banks and other financial institutions use mobile commerce to allow their customers to access account information and make transactions, such as purchasing stocks, and remitting money. This service is often referred to as mobile banking, or m-banking.

=== Mobile brokerage ===
Stock market services offered via mobile devices have also become more popular and are known as Mobile Brokerage. They allow the subscriber to react to market developments in a timely fashion and irrespective of their physical location.

=== Auctions ===
Over the past three years mobile reverse auction solutions have grown in popularity. Unlike traditional auctions, the reverse auction (or low-bid auction) bills the consumer's phone each time they place a bid. Multiple mobiles SMS commerce solutions rely on a one-time purchase or one-time subscription; however, reverse auctions offer a high return for the mobile vendor as they require the consumer to make multiple transactions over a long period of time.

=== Mobile browsing ===
Using a mobile browser—a World Wide Web browser on a mobile device—customers can shop online without having to be at their personal computer. Multiple mobile marketing apps with geo-location capability are now delivering user-specific marketing messages to the right person at the right time.

=== Mobile purchase ===
Catalog merchants can accept orders from customers electronically, via the customer's mobile device. In some cases, the merchant may even deliver the catalog electronically, rather than mailing a paper catalog to the customer. Consumers making mobile purchases can also receive value-add upselling services and offers. Some merchants provide mobile web sites that are customized for the smaller screen and limited user interface of a mobile device.

=== In-application mobile phone payments ===
Payments can be made directly inside an application running on a popular smartphone operating system, such as Google Android. Analyst firm Gartner expects in-application purchases to drive 41 percent of app store (also referred to as mobile software distribution platforms) revenue in 2016. In-app purchases can be used to buy virtual goods, new and other mobile content and is ultimately billed by mobile carriers rather than the app stores themselves. Ericsson's IPX mobile commerce system is used by 120 mobile carriers to offer payment options such as try-before-you-buy, rentals and subscriptions.

=== Mobile marketing and advertising ===
In the context of mobile commerce, mobile marketing refers to marketing sent to mobile devices. Companies have reported that they see better responses from mobile marketing campaigns than from traditional campaigns. The primary reason for this is the instant nature of customer decision-making that mobile apps and websites enable. The consumer can receive a marketing message or discount coupon and, within a few seconds, make a decision to buy and go on to complete the sale - without disrupting their current real-world activity.

For example, a busy mom tending to her household chores with a baby in her arm could receive a marketing message on her mobile about baby products from a local store. She can, within a few clicks, place an order for her supplies without having to plan ahead for it. There is no need to reach for her purse to find credit cards, no need to log into her laptop to recall the store's web address, and no need to find a babysitter while she runs to the store.

Research demonstrates that consumers of mobile and wireline markets represent two distinct groups who are driven by different values and behaviors, and who exhibit dissimilar psychographic and demographic profiles. What aspects truly distinguish between a traditional online shopper from home and a mobile on-the-go shopper? Research shows that how individuals relate to four situational dimensions- place, time, social context and control determine to what extent they are ubiquitous or situated as consumers. These factors are important in triggering m-commerce from e-commerce. As a result, successful mobile commerce requires the development of marketing campaigns targeted to these particular dimensions and according to user segments.

== Influence on youth markets ==
Mobile media is a rapidly changing field. New technologies, such as WiMax, act to accelerate innovation in mobile commerce. Early pioneers in mobile advertising include Vodafone, Orange, and SK Telecom. An empirical study shows that over 70% of mobile commerce users are under the age of 25, as of 2019.

Mobile devices are heavily used in South Korea to conduct mobile commerce. Mobile companies in South Korea believed that mobile technology would become synonymous with the youth lifestyle, based on their experience with previous generations of South Koreans. "Profitability for device vendors and carriers hinges on high-end mobile devices and the accompanying killer applications," said Daniel Longfield.

== Payment methods ==
Consumers can use multiple forms of payment in mobile commerce, including:

- Contactless payment for in-person transactions through a mobile phone (such as Apple Pay or Google Pay). In a system like EMV, these are interoperable with contactless credit and debit cards.
- Premium-rate telephone numbers, which apply charges to the consumer's long-distance bill
- Mobile-Operator Billing allows charges to be added to the consumer's mobile telephone bill, including deductions to pre-paid calling plans
- Credit cards and debit cards
  - Some providers allow credit cards to be stored in a phone's SIM card or secure element
  - Some providers are starting to use host card emulation, or HCE (e.g. Google Wallet and Softcard)
  - Some providers store credit card or debit card information in the cloud; usually in tokenized. With tokenization, payment verification, authentication, and authorization are still required, but payment card numbers don't need to be stored, entered, or transmitted from the mobile device
- Micropayment services
- Stored-value cards, often used with mobile-device application stores or music stores (e.g. iTunes)

== App design ==
Interaction design and UX design has been at the core of the m-commerce experience from its conception, producing apps and mobile web pages that create highly usable interactions for users. However, much debate has occurred as to the focus that should be given to the apps. In recent research, Parker and Wang demonstrated that within fashion m-Commerce apps, the degree that the app helps the user shop (increasing convenience) was the most prominent function. Such use examples might be through design cues that help the user find their products with minimal search. Additionally, shopping for others was a motivator for engaging in m-commerce apps with a great preference for close integration with social media. Research shows that culture makes a significant difference in people's motivation to engage in shopping, where Western consumers - for example - have significantly different motivations to Chinese consumers.

== App commerce ==
The popularity of apps has given rise to the latest iteration of mobile commerce: app commerce. This refers to retail transactions that take place on a native mobile app. App commerce is said to perform better than both desktop and mobile web when it comes to browsing duration and interactions. Average order value is reportedly greater with retail apps than traditional ecommerce, and conversion rates on apps are twice that of mobile websites. The convenience and tailored user experience of apps make them a preferred shopping channel for mobile-savvy consumers.

== Mobile Device Shopping Trends ==
Shopping search behavior also differs between mobile and non-mobile devices. An analysis of Google Shopping search data found that the mobile share of shopping searches was higher on weekends and holidays, particularly for products associated with more impulsive purchases or greater privacy needs. Mobile applications serve as a means to ensure positive user experience, seamless interaction, and increased revenues for e-commerce. According to a DesignRush report, mobile applications are expected to generate $189 billion by 2020. Moreover, a study by Forrester shows that mobile devices will be leveraged to facilitate over $1 trillion in sales in 2018.

== See also ==
- E-commerce
- Mobile banking
- Mobile commerce service provider
- Mobile dial code
- Mobile marketing
- Mobile payment
- Mobile ticketing
- Mobile app
