= European Mobile Payment Systems Association =

Mobile payments organisation

- Industry: Mobile payments
- Founded: 3 September 2019
- Headquarters: Zurich, Switzerland
- Area served: Albania, Austria, Belgium, Bulgaria, Denmark, Finland, Germany, Greece, Italy, Kosovo, Norway, Poland, Portugal, Romania, Spain, Sweden, Switzerland
- Key people: Søren Mose, Anna-Lena Wretman, Anton Stadelmann, Bjørn Skjelbred, Christian Pirkner, Mark Majgaard Wraa-Hansen, Nathalie Vandepeute, Tiago Bianchi de Aguiar
- Products: Mobile applications
- Members: Bancontact Payconiq Company, Bluecode, MobilePay, SIBS/MB WAY, Swish, Vipps
- Website: https://empsa.org/

The European Mobile Payment Systems Association (EMPSA) is an association that aims to foster collaboration and to enable the use of different mobile payments systems internationally. EMPSA is headquartered in Zurich, Switzerland and chaired by Søren Mose, the Chairman of the TWINT Board of Directors.

== History and future plans ==
European Mobile Payment Systems Association was founded on 3 September 2019.

In January 2022 EMPSA demonstrated a working system where test users of TWINT could pay in selected shops in Austria accepting Bluecode.

== Members ==
EMPSA was founded by seven mobile payment providers, including the three Scandinavian providers which at that time had more than half their population as users.

Current members include:

Service	Provider	Country	Joined
Bancontact Pay	Bancontact Company	Belgium	2019
Bluecode	Blue Code International AG	Worldwide (Note: Through partnerships with local and international payment networks, such as Alipay, Diners Club International and Discover Network.)	2019
MobilePay	Vipps MobilePay AS	Denmark; Finland; Greenland	2019
MB WAY	SIBS	Portugal	2019
Swish	Getswish AB	Sweden	2019
TWINT	Monexio AG	Switzerland	2019
Vipps	Vipps MobilePay AS	Norway; Sweden	2019
Bancomat Pay	Bancomat, S.p.A.	Italy	2020
BLIK	Polski Standard Płatności S. A	Poland	2020
Blink	BORICA	Bulgaria	2021
Bizum	Bizum, S.L.	Spain; Andorra	2022
IRIS Payments	DIAS Interbanking Systems S.A.	Greece	2022
RoPay	TRANSFOND	Romania	2025
KUIK	MPAY Sh.p.k	Albania; Kosovo	2025
