= Healthcare in Sweden =

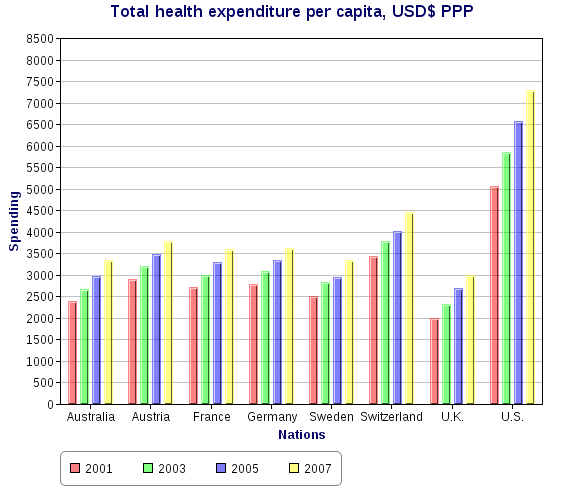
Total health spending per capita, in U.S. dollars PPP-adjusted, of Sweden compared amongst various other first world nations.

The Swedish health care system is mainly government-funded, universal for all citizens and decentralized, although private health care also exists. The health care system in Sweden is financed primarily through taxes levied by county councils and municipalities. A total of 21 councils are in charge with primary and hospital care within the country.

Private healthcare is a rarity in Sweden, and even those private institutions work under the mandated city councils. The city councils regulate the rules and the establishment of potential private practices. Although in most countries care for the elderly or those who need psychiatric help is conducted privately, in Sweden local, publicly funded authorities are in charge of this type of care.

== Management ==
Sweden's health care system is organized and managed on three levels: national, regional and local. At the national level, the Ministry of Health and Social Affairs establishes principles and guidelines for care and sets the political agenda for health and medical care. The ministry, along with other government bodies, supervises activities at the lower levels, allocates grants, and periodically evaluates services to ensure correspondence to national goals.

Regional responsibility for financing and providing health care is decentralized to the 21 county councils. A county council is a political body whose representatives are elected by the public every four years on the same day as the national general election. The executive board or hospital board of a county council exercises authority over hospital structure and management and ensures efficient health care delivery. County councils also regulate prices and the level of service offered by private providers. Private providers are required to enter into a contract with the county councils. Patients are not reimbursed for services from private providers who do not have an agreement with the county councils. According to the Swedish health and medical care policy, every county council must provide residents with good-quality health services and medical care and work toward promoting good health in the entire population.

At the local level, municipalities are responsible for maintaining the immediate environment of citizens, such as water supply and social welfare services. Recently, post-discharge care for the disabled and elderly and long-term care for psychiatric patients was decentralized to the local municipalities.

County councils have considerable leeway in deciding how care should be planned and delivered. This explains the wide regional variations.

It is informally divided into 7 sections: "Close-to-home care" (primary care clinics, maternity care clinics, out-patient psychiatric clinics, etc.), emergency care, elective care, in-patient care, out-patient care, specialist care, and dental care.

Since March 2018, all citizens have online access to their own electronic health records. Many different record systems are used, which has caused problems for interoperability. A national patient portal, 1177.se, is used by all systems, with both telephone and online access. As of June 2017, about 41% of the population had set up their own accounts to use personal e-services using this system. A national Health Information Exchange platform provides a single point of connectivity to the many different systems.

=== Provision ===
Private companies provide a significant portion of health care services, particularly in primary care. In 2023, approximately 46% of all primary care centers (vårdcentraler) in Sweden were privately run. However, hospital and specialist care remain largely public. Overall, private actors performed 19% of all publicly funded health care activities in 2023.

Public opinion regarding private profits in tax-funded welfare has historically been negative. Repeated surveys by the SOM Institute have shown that a clear majority of Swedes are opposed to allowing private companies to profit from providing tax-funded education and health care.

== Financing ==
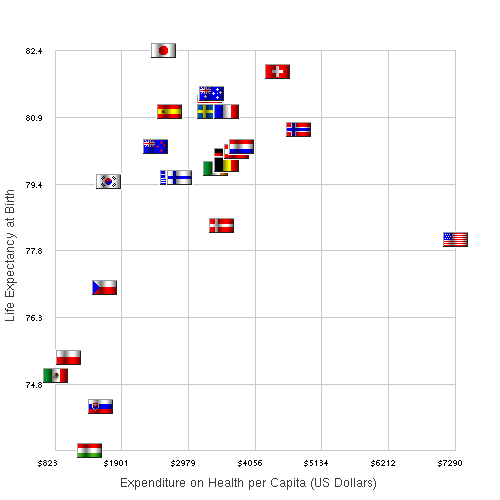
Healthcare spending vs life expectancy for some countries in 2007

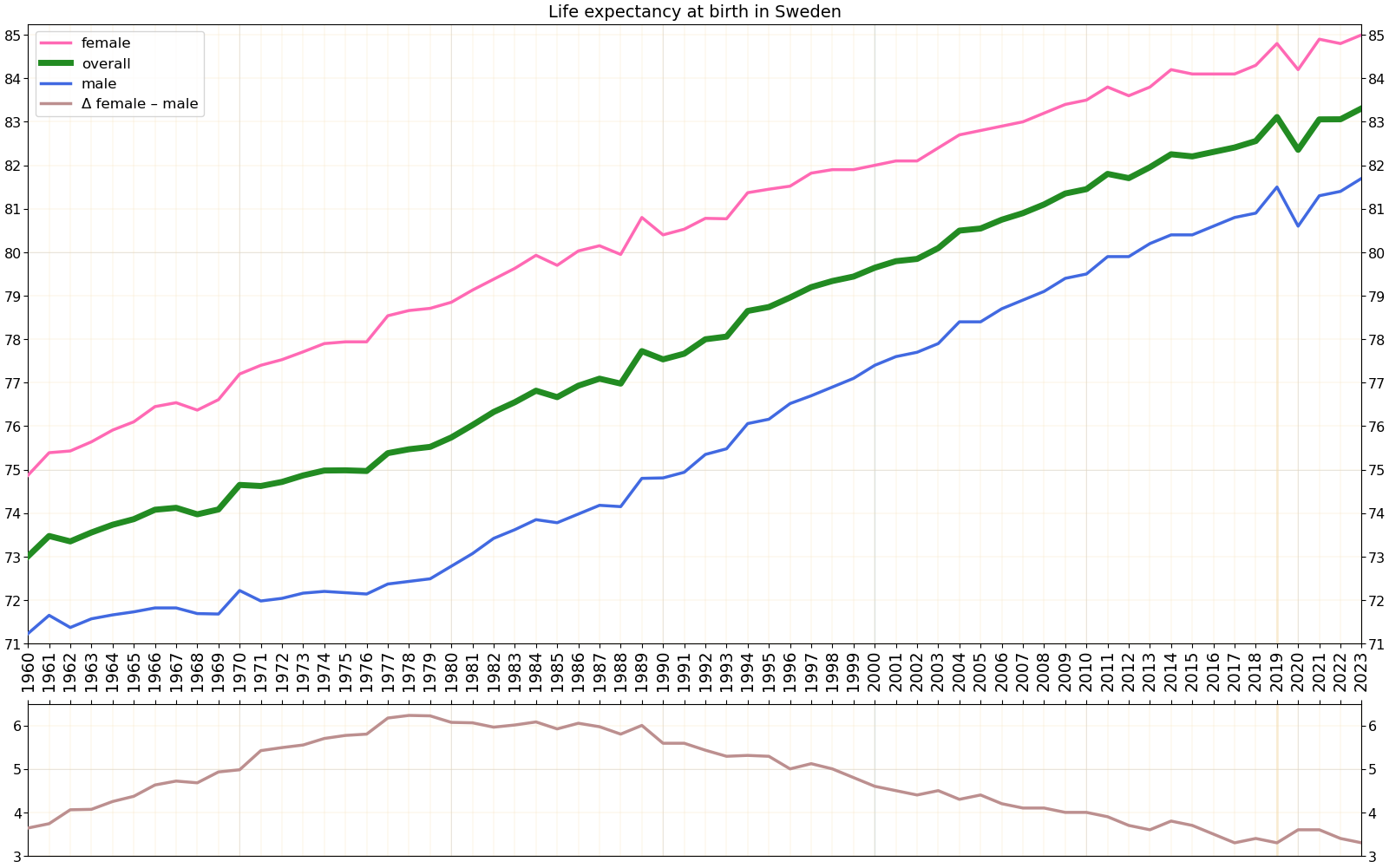
Life expectancy development in Sweden by gender

Costs for health and medical care amounted to approximately 9 percent of Sweden's gross domestic product in 2005, a figure that remained fairly stable since the early 1980s. By 2015 the cost had risen to 11.9% of GDP -the highest in Europe. Seventy-one percent of health care is funded through local taxation, and county councils have the right to collect income tax. The state finances the bulk of health care costs, with the patient paying a small nominal fee for examination. The state pays for approximately 97% of medical costs.

When a physician declares a patient to be ill for whatever reason (by signing a certificate of illness/unfitness), the patient is paid a percentage of their normal daily wage from the second day. For the first 14 days, the employer is required to pay this wage, and after that the state pays the wage until the patient is declared fit.

The funding and cost of keeps healthcare affordable and accessible to all Swedish citizens. Local taxes equate for about 70% of the budgets for councils and municipalities, while overall 85% of the total health budget come from public funding.

=== Details and patient costs ===
Prescription drugs are not free but fees to the user are capped at 2350 SEK per annum. Once a patient's prescriptions reach this amount, the government covers any further expenses for the rest of the year. The funding system is automated. The country's pharmacies are connected over the Internet. Each prescription is sent to the pharmacy network, which stores information on a patient's medical history and on the prescriptions fulfilled previously for that patient. If the patient's pharmaceutical expenses have exceeded the annual limit, the patient receives the medication free of charge at the point of sale, upon producing identification.

In a sample of 13 developed countries Sweden was eleventh in its population weighted usage of medication in 14 classes in 2009 and twelfth in 2013. The drugs studied were selected on the basis that the conditions treated had high incidence, prevalence and/or mortality, caused significant long-term morbidity and incurred high levels of expenditure and significant developments in prevention or treatment had been made in the last 10 years. The study noted considerable difficulties in cross border comparison of medication use.

A limit on health-care fees per year exists; 150-400 SEK for each visit to a doctor, regardless if they are a private doctor or work at a local health-care center or a hospital. When visiting a hospital, the entrance fee covers all specialist visits the doctor deems necessary, like x-ray, rheumatism specialist, heart surgery operations and so on. The same fee is levied for ambulance services. After 1150 SEK have been paid, health-care for the rest of the year will be provided free of charge.

Dental care is not included in the general health care system, but is partly subsidized by the government. Dental care is free for citizens until the end of the year in which they turn 19.

Mental health care is an integrated part of the health care system and is subject to the same legislation and user fees as other health care services. If an individual has minor mental health issues, they are attended to by a GP in a primary health setting; if the patient has major mental health issues they are referred to specialized psychiatric care in hospitals.

== Performance ==
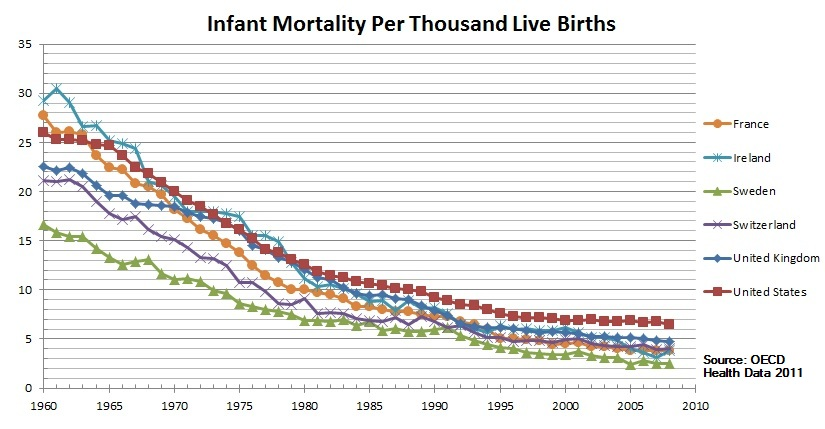
The reduction in infant mortality between 1960 and 2008 for Sweden in comparison with Ireland, France, Switzerland, the United Kingdom, and the United States.

The system of investigating incidents in maternity care has been very successful. It starts with a no-blame investigation, which is completed quickly. There is then a consideration of whether the problem was avoidable, and if they were how the learning from the incident can be used. Families get compensation if it was avoidable, usually without going to court.

=== Waiting times ===
Urgent cases are always prioritized and emergency cases are treated immediately. The national guarantee of care, Vårdgaranti, lays down standards for waiting times for scheduled care, aiming to keep waiting time below 7 days for a visit to a primary care physician, and no more than 90 days for a visit to a specialist.

According to the Euro health consumer index the Swedish score for technically excellent healthcare services, which they rated 10th in Europe in 2015, is dragged down by access and waiting time problems, in spite of national efforts such as Vårdgaranti. It is claimed that there is a long tradition of steering patients away from their doctor unless they are really sick.

A shortage of medical personnel is a major problem.

== Private healthcare ==
According to Insurance Sweden (the industry organization of Swedish insurance companies), by the end of 2024 just over 800,000 swedes had a private health insurance, which make up approximately 7.5% of the Swedish population. The number has increased steadily since 1990, when 23,000 swedes were covered by private insurance.

== Criticisms ==
The Swedish health system is mainly effective but there are some problems within the system. The decentralized healthcare system in Sweden leads to this inefficiency, because of decentralization the counties are granted an extreme amount of flexibility. The coordination between regions and municipalities is affected because of this constant shifting and flexibility. Variation between outcomes and access to care in different regions has been highlighted as a weakness of the system by Socialstyrelsen.

In recent years the health care system of Sweden has been heavily criticized for not providing the same quality of health care to all Swedish citizens. The disparity of health care quality in Sweden is growing. Swedish citizens of other ethnicities than Swedish, and citizens who are of a lower socio-economic class, receive a significantly lower quality of health care than the rest of the population. This was especially brought to light during the COVID-19 pandemic, as Swedish media and public health researchers pointed out that Swedish citizens of other ethnicities than Swedish, and people living in working class areas, were dying from COVID-19 at a significantly higher rate than the rest of the population, due to the fact that they were not provided with the same quality of health care.

In January 2023, IVO, the Swedish Health and Social Care Inspectorate released a report based on its inspections of 27 hospitals. This report concluded that the current system could not adequately guarantee patient safety in any of the hospitals inspected. By October, only 4 of the hospitals were confirmed to have corrected all issues noted by IVO.

== See also ==
- Health in Sweden
- Health care compared - tabular comparisons with the US, Canada, and other countries not shown above.
- Vårdguiden 1177
