= Micropayment =

Financial transaction involving a very small sum of money

A micropayment is a financial transaction involving a very small sum of money and usually one that occurs online. Several micropayment systems were proposed and developed in the mid-to-late 1990s that were ultimately unsuccessful. A second generation of micropayment systems emerged in the 2010s.

While micropayments were initially envisioned to involve very small sums of money, practical systems to allow transactions of less than US$1 have seen little success. One problem that has prevented the emergence of micropayment systems is the need to keep costs for individual transactions low, which is impractical when transacting such small sums even if the transaction fee is just a few cents.

== Definition ==
There are several different definitions of what constitutes a micropayment. PayPal defines a micropayment as a transaction of less than £5 while Visa defines it as a transaction under 20 Australian dollars.

== History ==
The term was coined by Ted Nelson long before the invention of the World Wide Web. Initially, this was conceived to pay the various copyright holders of a compound work. Micropayments, on the Web, were initially devised as a way of allowing the sale of online content and as a way to pay for very low-cost network services. They were envisioned to involve small fractions of a cent, as little as US$0.0001 to a few cents. Micropayments would enable people to sell content on the Internet and would be an alternative to advertising revenue. During the late 1990s, there was a movement to create microtransaction standards, and the World Wide Web Consortium (W3C) worked on incorporating micropayments into HTML, even going as far as to suggest the embedding of payment-request information in HTTP error codes. The W3C has since stopped its efforts in this area, and micropayments have not become a widely used method of selling content over the Internet.

=== Early research and systems ===
Established companies such as IBM and Compaq had microtransaction divisions in the late 1990s. Research on micropayments and micropayment standards was performed at Carnegie Mellon and by the World Wide Web Consortium.

==== IBM Micro Payments ====
IBM's Micro Payments was established c. 1999, and were it to have become operational would have "allowed vendors and merchants to sell content, information, and services over the Internet for amounts as low as one cent".

==== iPIN ====
An early attempt at making micropayments work, iPIN was a 1998 venture-capital-funded startup that provided services that allowed purchasers to add incremental micropayment charges to their existing bill for Internet services. Debuting in 1999, its service was never widely adopted.

==== Millicent ====
Millicent, originally a project of Digital Equipment Corporation, was a micropayment system to support transactions from as small as 1/10 of a cent up to $5.00. It grew out of The Millicent Protocol for Inexpensive Electronic Commerce, which was presented at the 1995 World Wide Web Conference in Boston, but the project became associated with Compaq after that company purchased Digital Equipment Corporation. The payment system employed symmetric cryptography.

==== NetBill ====
The NetBill electronic commerce project at Carnegie Mellon university researched Distributed transaction processing systems and developed protocols and software to support payment for goods and services over the Internet. It featured pre-paid accounts from which micropayment charges could be drawn. NetBill was initially absorbed by CyberCash in 1997 and ultimately taken over by PayPal.

== Online gaming ==
The term micropayment or microtransaction is sometimes attributed to the sale of virtual goods in online games, most commonly involving an in-game currency or service bought with real-world money and only available within the online game.

== Recent systems ==
Current systems either allow many micropayments but charge the user's phone bill one lump sum or use funded wallets.

=== Dropp ===
Dropp is a micropayments platform that allows consumers and merchants to make and accept payments as low as $0.01 for physical or digital goods and services. Dropp accepts both FIAT and cryptocurrencies: the US dollar, AED, HBAR, and USDC. Dropp's platform is designed to provide a Pay-Per-Use alternative to flat fee paid subscriptions as a solution to consumer subscription fatigue. Dropp provides an alternative monetization model to digital merchants while maintaining complete privacy for consumer transactions. Dropp's fee is 5 cents for a $1 transaction, with an average fee of 1% + 25 cents on all transactions above $5. Dropp is currently supported on mobile and web browsers and has Shopify and WordPress user plugins for accepting micropayments.

=== Flattr ===
Flattr is a micropayment system (specifically, a microdonation system) launched in August 2010. Actual bank transactions and overhead costs are involved only in funds withdrawn from the recipient's accounts.

=== Jamatto ===
Jamatto is a micropayments and microsubscriptions system that allows websites and publishers to accept payments as small as 1¢ by modifying their HTML source code. Jamatto is used by newspapers across three continents.

=== M-Coin ===
A service provided by TIMWE, M-Coin allows users to make online micropayments. The mobile network operator then charges the user's phone bill.

=== PayPal ===
PayPal MicroPayments is a micropayment system that charges payments to users' PayPal accounts and allows transactions of less than US$12 to take place. As of 2013, the service is offered in selected currencies only. The PayPal charge for a micropayment from a U.S. account is a flat five cents per transaction plus five percent of the transaction (as compared with PayPal's normal 2.9% and 30 cents for larger sums).

=== Swish ===
Swish is a payment system between bank accounts in Sweden that was introduced in 2012. It is designed for small instant transactions between people, instead of using cash (cash has largely dropped in use in Sweden since 2010), but is also used by small businesses such as sports clubs that don't want to deal with the cost of a credit card reader. A cell phone number is used as a unique user identifier and must have been registered at a Swedish bank. A smartphone app is used to send money, but any cell phone can be used as a receiver.

The lowest permitted payment is 1 SEK (around 0.09 EUR) and the highest is 10,000 (around 950 EUR), although 150,000 SEK can be transferred if the transaction is preregistered in the internet bank. The fee is generally zero for private people, but when the receiver is an organisation, e.g., a sports club or a company, there is a fee of 2 SEK.

Similar apps with zero fee for small instant private transactions, Vipps and MobilePay have become popular in Norway and Denmark.

=== Tikkie ===
Tikkie is a Dutch payment system in the Netherlands, Belgium and Germany, run by the ABN AMRO bank. It is available to anyone with a Dutch bank account and a Dutch, Belgian or German phone number. It was originally marketed as a way to share costs between friends, e.g. when sharing a ride, at a restaurant or buying movie tickets. Still, there is now also a business variant for, e.g., paying toll fees or congestion charges, and a restaurant variant whereby the restaurant sends payment requests to the individual people at the table. Tikkie is free for private transactions (even for users of other banks, since Dutch banks typically charge annual banking fees instead of per-transaction fees), but there is a transaction cost for business clients.

A Tikkie payment request consists of a generated hyperlink (which may be encoded as a QR code) that redirects to the iDeal payment system used by most banks in the Netherlands. If the payer has a banking app for any Dutch bank on their mobile device, the Tikkie link can open the banking app directly. Alternatively, the payment can be made using a web browser. Payment requests are generated by an Apple or Android mobile app, and payment requests are typically sent via messaging systems like WhatsApp or Telegram.

In 2017, there were 1 million users and 150,000 payment requests per week. By 2018, Tikkie reported 2 million users and 440,000 payment requests per week. By 2019, there were about 5 million users, with 200,000 daily payment requests. 50% of Tikkie payment requests are honoured within 1 hour, and 80% are paid within 24 hours. In 2017, the average payment request was EUR 12. By 2018, the average payment request was EUR 27.50. A sender may send no more than EUR 750; a recipient may receive no more than EUR 2500 per Tikkie.

=== Blendle ===
Blendle is an online news platform that aggregates articles from various newspapers and magazines and sells them on a pay-per-article basis, leading Nieman Lab to describe it as a "micropayments-for-news pioneer". It operates in the Netherlands, Germany and the US. In 2019, five years after its launch, it announced that it would change its business model from micropayments to premium subscriptions. Nieman Lab commented that "micropayments keep not panning out".

== Obsolete systems ==
=== Zong ===
Zong mobile payments was a micropayment system that charged payments to users' mobile phone bills. The company was acquired by eBay and integrated with PayPal in 2011.
