= DigiD =

Identity management platform

Stable release(s)
- Android: 6.15.0 / 20 June 2025
- iOS: 6.15.1 / 2 July 2025
- Operating system: Android, iOS
- Type: Electronic identification
- Website: www.digid.nl/en/

DigiD is an identity management platform which government agencies of the Netherlands, including the Tax and Customs Administration and Dienst Uitvoering Onderwijs, can use to verify the identity of Dutch residents on the Internet. In 2022, it was used for 557 million authentications by 16.5 million citizens. The system is tied to the Dutch national identification number (burgerservicenummer, BSN). The system has been mandatory when submitting tax forms electronically since 2006.

== Security ==
In July 2011, DigiNotar, the company that was providing the certificates used for DigiD under the PKI root-CA PKIoverheid, suffered the theft of hundreds of certificate codes. Although not directly linked to certificates used by DigiD, the result of the hack was that the government lost its trust in certificates issued by the company, both under their own root CA and the certificates under the governments' root PKIoverheid. Prosecutors said they would investigate the U.S.-owned, Netherlands-based DigiNotar.

In 2014, it was discovered that many DigiD phishing websites existed, which were taken offline. 24 websites of municipalities had weak passwords that allowed hacking DigiD credentials.

== See also ==
- Electronic identification
