= Wireless payment =

Wireless payment can refer to:

- Contactless payment in close physical proximity
- Mobile payment on a remote mobile device
