= National identity card (Algeria) =

National identity card of Algeria

Algerian national identity card بطاقة التعريف الوطنية الجزائرية
- Type: Personal identification document
- Issued by: Algeria; Ministry of the Interior (Municipality)
- First issued: 11 July 1967 (Decree N° 67-126); 2016 (biometric card)
- Purpose: Identification
- Valid in: People's Democratic Republic of Algeria
- Eligibility: Algerian nationals (mandatory at age 18, optional for minors)
- Expiration: 10 years (5 years for minors)
- Cost: Free of charge the first time. In case of loss or damage, renewal costs 1000 DA (~US$7)
- Website: interieur.gov.dz

The Algerian national identity card (Arabic: بطاقة التعريف الوطنية الجزائرية) is Algeria's official identity document issued to Algerian citizens by the Ministry of the Interior. It serves as proof of identity, nationality, and residence and is mandatory for accessing a wide range of administrative services in Algeria. The card is issued in a credit card–sized format with biometric features, including a digital chip, and is valid for ten years. It is required for voting, opening bank accounts, and other legal procedures, and can also be used as a travel document for entry into certain neighboring countries without a passport.

== Requirements ==
The following documents are required for issuing or renewing a biometric national identity card in Algeria:

- A completed application form, signed by the applicant or their legal guardian (for minors);
- An extract of birth certificate "S-12" (special form);
- Certificate of Algerian nationality (for first-time applicants or if nationality is in doubt);
- Certificate of residence not older than six months;
- Proof of occupation or status (school certificate, work certificate, etc.);
- Several recent identical passport-style photographs meeting biometric standards;
- Copy of blood type card;
- The old national identity card in case of renewal, or a declaration of loss, theft, or damage;
- For Algerians residing abroad: proof of consular registration and proof of residence abroad;
- A tax stamp or fee may be required in cases of renewal due to loss, theft, or deterioration.

== History ==
Prior to Algeria's independence, earlier versions of the identity card were issued by the French colonial administration in Algeria.

The back of the old national paper ID card

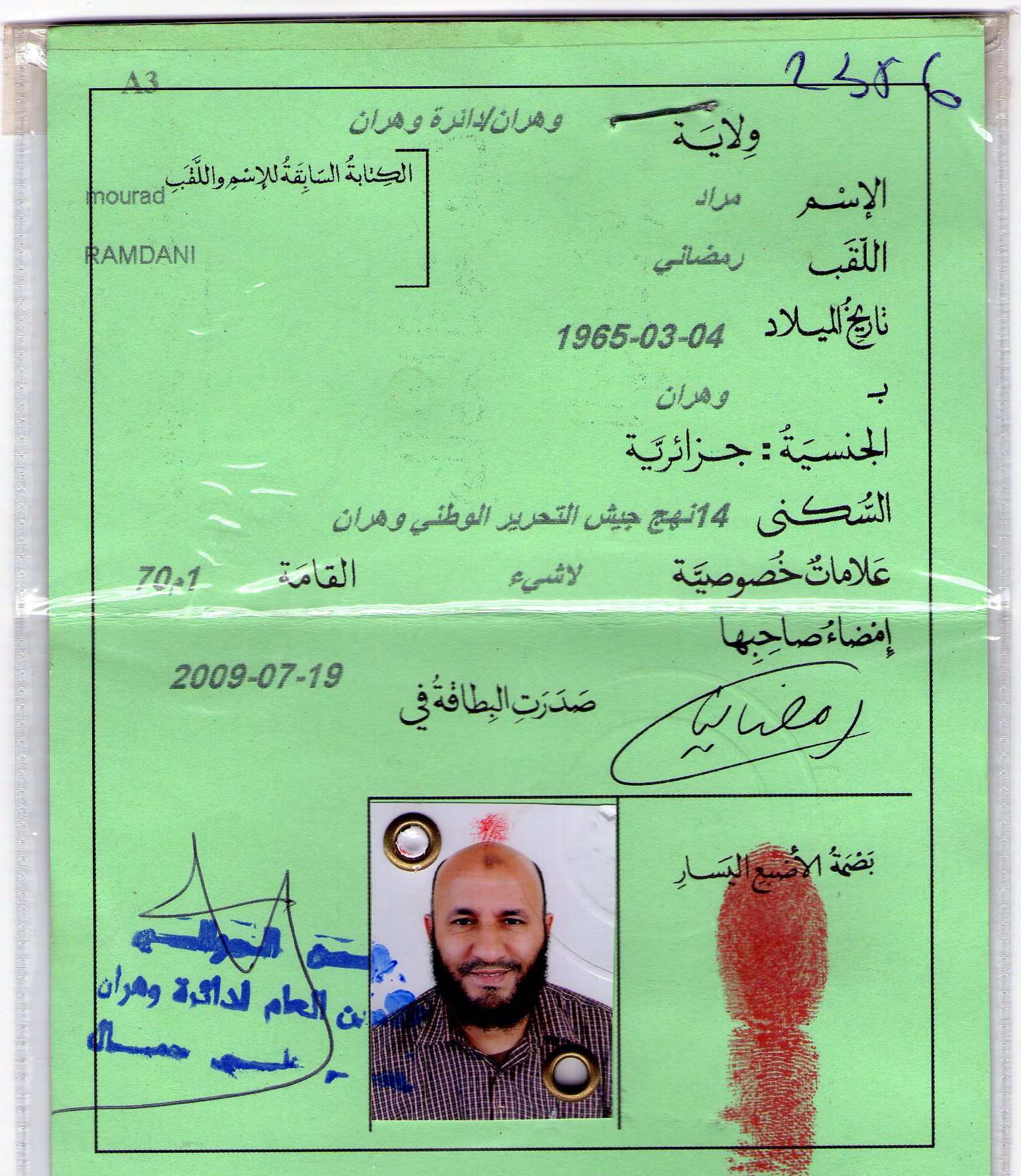
The front of the old national paper ID card

== See also ==
- Algerian passport
- Algerian nationality law
- List of national identity card policies by country
- Identity document
