= BankID =

BankID or Bank ID may refer to:

- BankID (Sweden), a widely used electronic identification system in Sweden.
- BankID (Norway), a similar electronic identification system used in Norway.
- Bank iD, a similar electronic identification system used in the Czech Republic
