= Fox-IT =

Information security company in the Netherlands

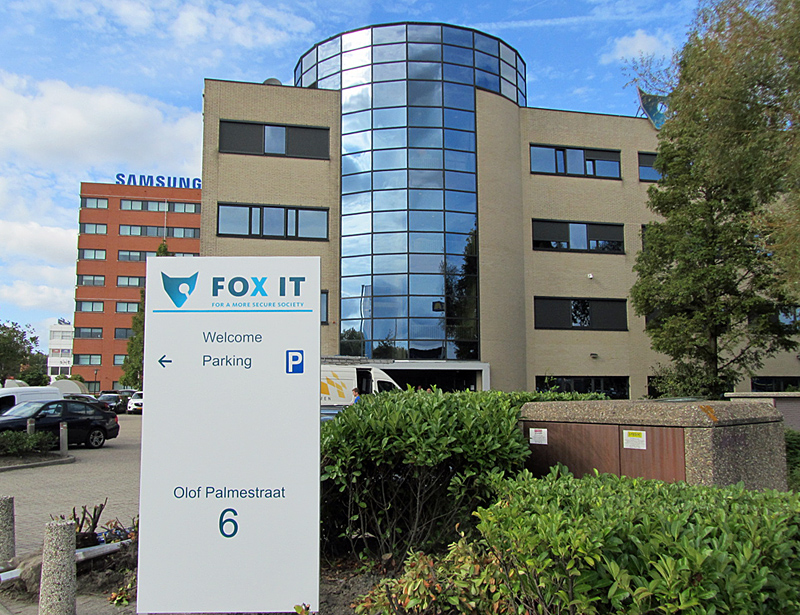
- Headquarters in Delft, the Netherlands
- Company type: Private
- Industry: Information security
- Founded: 1999
- Owner: NCC Group (2015-current)
- Website: fox-it.com

Fox-IT is an information security company specialized in digital forensics and penetration testing. It was founded in 1999 and has been a subsidiary of NCC Group since 2015.

The company is a major advisor to the government of the Netherlands.

== History ==
Logo as of 2001
Logo as of 2006
Logo as of 2015

In 2003, Fox-IT partially acquired Philips-Crypto, an independent cryptography company within Philips. Between 2007 and 2011, Fox-IT promoted their technology in Middle Eastern countries. In 2011, Fox-IT did the investigation of the DigiNotar hack, a Dutch certificate authority that went defunct afterwards. In 2011, it sold Fox Replay Analyst to NetScout Systems. In 2015, the founders of the company sold the company to NCC Group. In 2022, it released incident response software under an open source license. In 2024, it sold their cryptographic subsidiary Fox Crypto to CR Group and renamed the company to Sentyron.
