= Transfond =

- Company type: Public
- Industry: Finance
- Founded: 2000
- Headquarters: Bucharest, Romania
- Products: Financial services
- Parent: National Bank of Romania (majority)
- Website: transfond.ro

Transfond is a Romanian financial services company, consisting of 25 banks, which hold 66.67% of the shares. The largest shareholding is controlled by the National Bank of Romania, with one third of the capital.

The company was established in 2000, following the commitments made to the European Union regarding the modernization of the financial and banking infrastructure. Transfond is the operator of the Electronic Payment System: administrator and operator of the SENT system (automatic clearing house), technical administrator and operator of the ReGIS system (real-time gross settlement system), according to the mandate granted by the National Bank of Romania, technical operator of the SaFIR system (the deposit and settlement system for government securities operations).

Transfond is responsible for processing interbank payments in Romania. The main field of activity is the provision of clearing and settlement services for non-cash payments in national currency, for credit institutions, the National Bank of Romania and other financial institutions.

== History ==
In November 2022, the Beneficiary Name Display Service (SANB) was introduced, which verifies the identity of the holder of a specific IBAN.

== RoPay ==
The company is managing and operating RoPay, the instant mobile payment service that allows direct account-to-account transfers from one bank account to another in the Romanian banking system without the intermediation of card operators .

== Card Hotline ==
Transfond launched, starting with September 1, 2009, the Card Hotline (LUC), a service intended for card issuers in Romania, which provides customers of enrolled institutions with a single contact number, available 24/7/365, for blocking lost or stolen cards. The system ensures that the call is taken within a maximum of 30 seconds and allows the simultaneous processing of a maximum of 90 calls. In June 2010, the service was used by only five banks, namely: Banca Comercială Română, BRD-SocGen, Bancpost, Banca Transilvania and CEC Bank, which had a 60% share of the Romanian bank card market. The system operated as a pilot program for nine months, during which the service recorded a monthly average of 700-800 calls, and was officially launched on 25 June 2010.
