= Vårdgaranti =

Swedish healthcare standard

The Vårdgaranti (National Guaranteed Access to Healthcare) is a standard established in Sweden for public healthcare services. It applies to planned visits and surgery within specialist care. It applies to all planned care that is medically justifiable. It does not apply to emergency care.

It was established on 1 November 2005 from which date patients have the right to see a doctor at the health center within seven days from the day they sought help, to see a specialist doctor within 90 days, and initiation of treatment should take place within a further 90 days if the specialist considers this justified. From the day you seek help from a doctor at the health center, you are then "guaranteed" treatment, if needed, in a maximum of 187 days.

It does not regulate whether care shall be provided, or what care may be considered.

With the enlargement of the care guarantee, there are now clear targets for the availability of the greater part of the continuum of care. The goals are usually expressed with the number series 0-7 - 90 - 90, indicating the national care guarantee legal time limits in the number of days for the various steps in continuum of care. There are counties and regions that have shorter time limits than the national care guarantee.

- 0 days: Primary Care will offer contact in the phone or on site the same day ....
- 7 days: and a doctor - if necessary - in no more than seven days.
- 90 days: After the decision on referral / demand for care, a visit to the specialist care should be offered in more than 90 days from the decision date ....
- 90 days: ... and an approved treatment in more than 90 days from the decision date.

The waiting period may exceed 90 days, provided that the patient and physician agree to this.

In the first instance, visits and treatments are offered in their own county. If the county council can not meet the legal time limits, the patient should be helped to care within the guarantee period of another caregiver. The homeland Parliament will help with all the contacts and this must not entail additional costs for the patient.

For monitoring of the care guarantee and the availability of care looks in the county councils / regions have a website: where details of waiting times are available. Contact information for each county council care guarantee function is available on the website.
