= Vårdguiden 1177 =

Swedish healthcare company

Vårdguiden 1177 is a Swedish service providing healthcare by telephone and the central national infrastructure for Swedish healthcare online.

== Services ==
=== 1177's e-services ===
==== Electronic identification log in requirement ====
From December 10, 2019, 1177.se began requiring patients to log in with BankID or Freja eID. Telia e-identification, and login with foreign eID via software for countries that have joined the EU regulation Electronic Identification, Authentication and Trust Services (eIDAS) regulation also work.

=== 1177's phone services ===
==== Incidents ====
In February 2019, Computer Sweden revealed that all calls made to 1177 since 2013 that were answered by the subcontractor Medicall were stored as audio files on a server that lacked both encryption and user authentication.

The Integrity Protection Authority decided that a total of five actors would pay a fine. Medhelp must pay a fine of SEK 12 million in total, eight million for the exposed audio files and three million for the incorrect agreement with Medicall and 500,000 each for not having provided information and not backing up. Voice Integrate must pay SEK 650,000 for not having taken appropriate measures to protect the audio files. The Stockholm region must pay SEK 500,000 and the regions Sörmland and Värmland SEK 250,000 each for breaching their information to those who call 1177.

== See also ==
- Health care in Sweden
