= BankAxept =

Norwegian national payment system

- Current owner: Stø AS
- Country: Norway
- Introduced: 1991
- Website: bankaxept.no

BankAxept is the national payment system in Norway, used both physically and eventually digitally. The security of BankAxept is accomplished with the use of chip technology and PIN codes. Payments of less than NOK 500 can be carried contactless and without use of a PIN code. By using BankAxept, the money is charged from the cardholder's account immediately, and it is always verified whether or not there is money on the account.

A payment card with BankAxept can be used in all ATMs, most payment terminals in Norway, and online shopping as well. Most stores in Norway, around 110,000, are tied up to the BankAxept system, and it is the most used payment solution in the country. More than eight out of ten card payments in physical stores are paid with a BankAxept enabled card. According to Finans Norge, Norway is full speed ahead towards the first cash free society in a few years.

To be able to accept payment with BankAxept cards, the merchant must sign an agreement directly with BankAxept AS. Additionally, the merchant has to have an agreement with their bank connection of redemption of BankAxept transactions.

BankAxept is owned by Norwegian banks, and has the task of developing new payment solutions for a constantly changing world.

== History ==
Bank cards in Norway was established as a standardized solution for all banks after an agreement between Sparebankforeningen (The Savings Bank Union) and Den norske Bankforening (The Norwegian Bank Union). In the beginning of the 1990s, the different payment solutions in Norway were merged, and the banks formed a common, electronic payment solution (EFTPOS) via the company BankAxept AS that made it possible to pay with bank cards in businesses. BankAxept AS was owned by the banks in common. The BankAxept service was launched the same year by Bankens BetalingsSentral (The Bank's Payment Central), BBS for short. In 2010, BBS merged with Pengeinstitutternes BetalingsSystemer in Denmark, forming the Danish-Norwegian financial company Nets, one of Northern Europe's largest providers of payment cards and payment solutions. Today, the brand BankAxept is managed by Finansnæringens Fellesorganisasjon (FNO). FNO also administers the agreements for BankAxept.

From 1 December 2011, it was no longer possible to use the magnet strip on BankAxept cards in payment terminals in Norway. From then on, you had to use the chip.

To meet the challenges from new actors and new payment solutions, BankID BankAxept AS was founded in April 2014 as BankAxept AS. It develops new payment solutions in new channels. In this lies, among other things, contactless payments with card and mobile phone, and online payments. It is owned by the banks.

== Use of the service ==
BankAxept is a public service that makes it possible for a buyer to approve charge of their bank account in favour of a seller with an account in another bank. Any Norwegian bank card with BankAxept functionality and can, in addition to ATM withdrawals, be used in any business that supports BankAxept. Most banks operating in Norway provide BankAxept cards, and therefore, most of the card transactions and money flow happen via BankAxept. International payment systems such as Visa and Mastercard are supported, but play a much smaller role. The usage of credit cards are relatively small, but increasing.

BankAxept is cheaper for the merchants to accept compared to international payment systems. Part of the cause of this is that BankAxept cards are attached to low risk and following has low costs attached to security.

In Norway, payments made with bank cards over a payment terminal is often combined with withdrawal of up to 1000 NOK (USD 120) without paying a fee. For withdrawal of cash from a bank card in an ATM it can be charged fees outside the bank's opening hours or if the account is in another bank than the ATM's owner.

Because the customers have to use a PIN code in the BankAxept system, but not with many other systems, it is also much more frequent that stolen debit cards are abused in card fraud with merchants that only have an agreement with the international payment systems and online.

== See also ==
- BankID (Norway)
