= Mi-Pay =

NFC-based mobile payment system

Mi Pay
- Developer(s): Xiaomi
- Operating system: MIUI 10 and above
- Type: Online payment
- License: Proprietary
- Website: shanfu.mipay.com

Mi-Pay is a contactless NFC-based mobile payment system that supports credit, debit and public transportation cards in China. The service was launched by Xiaomi in partnership with UnionPay.

In December 2018 Xiaomi launched Mi Pay in India in partnership with ICICI Bank. Apart from sending and receiving money, one can pay utility bills and mobile and broadband recharges.

On 28 October 2022, the company suddenly decided to wound up its financial services in India, including mi pay and mi credit and decided to focus only on their core strength.

== Xiaomi Pay ==
Xiaomi Pay is the NFC cashless payment service supported by Xiaomi wearable products is listed below with the applicable banks. The availability of NFC may vary by country and region. Please see below for a list of countries or regions and banks that support cashless payments for each Xiaomi wearable product. Supported devices: Xiaomi Watch S1 Pro, Xiaomi Smart Band 7 NFC and Xiaomi Smart Band 6 NFC.

=== Supported countries ===
Xiaomi Pay can be used with cards issued in 34 countries and territories worldwide.

Date launched	Support for payment cards issued in
May 31, 2018	China
June 16, 2020	Russia
September 24, 2020	Belarus
September 24, 2020	Ukraine
October 6, 2021	Austria
October 6, 2021	Belgium
October 6, 2021	Bulgaria
October 6, 2021	Croatia
October 6, 2021	Cyprus
October 6, 2021	Czech Republic
October 6, 2021	Denmark
October 6, 2021	Estonia
October 6, 2021	Finland
October 6, 2021	France
October 6, 2021	Germany
October 6, 2021	Greece
October 6, 2021	Hungary
October 6, 2021	Iceland
October 6, 2021	Ireland
October 6, 2021	Italy
October 6, 2021	Latvia
October 6, 2021	Liechtenstein
October 6, 2021	Lithuania
October 6, 2021	Luxembourg
October 6, 2021	Malta
October 6, 2021	Netherlands
October 6, 2021	Norway
October 6, 2021	Poland
October 6, 2021	Portugal
October 6, 2021	Romania
October 6, 2021	Slovakia
October 6, 2021	Slovenia
October 6, 2021	Spain
October 6, 2021	Sweden
October 6, 2021	United Kingdom
August 15, 2022	Moldova

== See also ==
- Apple Pay
- Samsung Pay
