= Electronic identification =

Digital proof of identity

An electronic identification ("eID") is a digital solution for proof of identity of citizens or organizations. They can be used to view to access benefits or services provided by government authorities, banks or other companies, for mobile payments, etc. Apart from online authentication and login, many electronic identity services also give users the option to sign electronic documents with a digital signature.

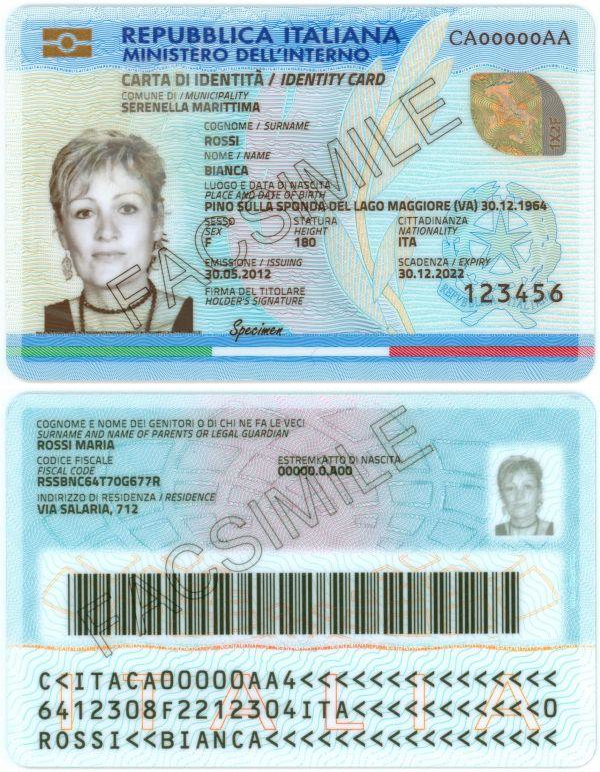
Italian electronic identity document.

One form of eID is an electronic identification card (eIC), which is a physical identity card that can be used for online and offline personal identification or authentication. The eIC is a smart card in ID-1 format of a regular bank card, with identity information printed on the surface (such as personal details and a photograph) and in an embedded RFID microchip, similar to that in biometric passports. The chip stores the information printed on the card (such as the holder's name and date of birth) and the holder's photo(s). Several photos may be taken from different angles along with different facial expressions, thus allowing the biometric facial recognition systems to measure and analyze the overall structure, shape and proportions of the face. It may also store the holder's fingerprints. The card may be used for online authentication, such as for age verification or for e-government applications. An electronic signature, provided by a private company, may also be stored on the chip.

Countries which currently issue government-issued eIDs include Afghanistan, Bangladesh, Belgium, Bulgaria, Chile, Estonia, Finland, Guatemala, Germany, Iceland, India, Indonesia, Israel, Italy, Latvia, Lithuania, Luxembourg, the Netherlands, Nigeria, Morocco, Pakistan, Peru, Portugal, Poland, Romania, Saudi Arabia, Spain, Slovakia, Malta, and Mauritius. Germany, Uruguay and previously Finland have accepted government issued physical eICs. Norway, Sweden and Finland accept bank-issued eIDs (also known as BankID) for identification by government authorities. There are also an increasing number of countries applying electronic identification for voting (enrollment, issuing voter ID cards, voter identification and authentication, etc.), including those countries using biometric voter registration.

== eID in Europe ==
=== European Union ===
According to the EU electronic identification and trust services (eIDAS) Regulation, described as a pan-European login system, all organizations delivering public digital services in an EU member state shall accept electronic identification from all EU member states from 29 September 2018.

=== Austria ===
Austria has initially issued eIDs ("Bürgerkarte") via its national health insurance card (eCard), but has later introduced an app-based solution ("Handy-Signatur"). Electronic signatures were deemed equivalent to handwritten signatures since January 2000. As of 5 December 2023, the Handy-Signatur and the Bürgerkarte (Citizen Card) have been upgraded and replaced by "ID Austria", which offers enhanced digital identification and authentication capabilities. More than 2 Million people are enrolled in ID Austria. It interconnects with eIDAS systems from other EU Member States. It is widely used for government online services, but also increasingly by the private sector.

=== Belgium ===
Belgium has been issuing eIDs since 2003, and all identity cards issued since 2004 have been electronic, replacing the previous plastic card.

==== Chip contents ====
The eID card contains a chip containing:

- the same information as legible on the card
- the address of the card holder
- the identity - and signature keys and certificates
- fingerprints
- place of birth

==== Using the eID ====
At home, the users can use their electronic IDs to log into specific websites (such as Tax-on-web, allowing them to fill in their tax form online). To do this the user needs

- an eID card
- a smartcard reader
- the eID middleware software

When other software (such as an Internet Browser) attempts to read the eID, the users are asked for confirmation for this action, and potentially even for their PIN.

Other applications include signing emails with the user's eID certificate private key. Giving the public key to your recipients allows them to verify your identity.

==== Kids ID ====
Although legally Belgian citizens only have to carry an ID from the age of 12, as of March 2009, a "Kids ID" has been introduced for children below this age, on a strictly voluntary basis. This ID, beside containing the usual information, also holds a contact number that people, or the child themselves, can call when they, for example, are in danger or had an accident. The card can be used for electronic identification after the age of six, and it does not contain a signing certificate as minors cannot sign a legally binding document. An important goal of the Kids-ID card is to allow children to join "youth-only" chat sites, using their eID to gain entrance. These sites would essentially block any users above a certain age from gaining access to the chat sessions, effectively blocking out potential pedophiles.

=== Bulgaria ===
Bulgaria introduced a limited scale proof-of-concept of electronic identity cards, called ЕИК (Eлектронна карта за идентичност), in 2013.

=== Croatia ===
Croatia introduced its electronic identity cards, called e-osobna iskaznica, on 8 June 2015.

=== Denmark ===
Electronic identities in Denmark, issued by banks and the government jointly, is named MitID. The former eID, NemID, was deprecated as of October 2023. MitID authentication allows larger payments in MobilePay - a service used by more than half of the population as of 2017.

=== Estonia ===
The Estonian ID card, issued since 2002, is also used for authentication for Estonia's Internet-based voting system. In February 2007, Estonia was the first country to allow for electronic voting for parliamentary elections. Over 30,000 voters participated in the country's e-election.

At end of 2014 Estonia extended the Estonian ID Card to non-residents. The target of the project is to reach 10 million residents by 2025, which is 8 times more than the Estonian population of 1.3 million.

=== Finland ===
The Finnish electronic ID was first issued to citizens on 1 December 1999. Electronic identities in Finland are issued by banks. They make it possible to log into Finnish authorities, universities and banks, and to make larger payments using the MobilePay mobile payment service. The mobiilivarmenne is utilizing the mobile phone SIM card for authentication, and is financed by a fee to the mobile network operator for each authentication.

=== France ===
Since 2021, France has rolled out a physical chip enabled ID card (Carte Nationale d'Identité or CNI as a short) with a ISO ID-1 profile. The mobile application France Identité provides eID mobile features such as authentication on the identity federation portal (France Connect) as well as multiple factor authentication thru another portal (France Connect +) to access multiple administration and non administration websites in France. The app is initiated using the CNI. It also serves as a digital wallet to store personal credentials (driving licences, car documents, etc) and it can generate a document to prove identity in a secure way without sending a copy of the documents (Justificatif d'identité à usage unique). Previous ID cards are being phased out and new cards are being provided free.

=== Germany ===
Germany introduced its electronic identity cards, called Personalausweis, in 2010.

=== Greece ===
Greece introduced a new generation of electronic identity cards (Δελτίο Ταυτότητας νέου τύπου) starting in 2023, replacing the older paper-based identity cards. The new cards include an embedded contactless electronic chip containing the holder’s personal and biometric data, and are compliant with ICAO and EU security standards. The electronic Greek ID card is intended for secure identification and authentication, both in physical and digital contexts, and is designed to support access to e-government services. In parallel, Greece has developed a digital identity framework through the government platform gov.gr, including mobile-based digital credentials via Gov.gr Wallet, which can be used for identification in selected public and private sector services. The rollout of the new electronic identity cards is being carried out gradually nationwide.

=== Iceland ===
In Iceland, electronic IDs (Icelandic: Rafræn skilríki) are extensively used by the public and private sector today and were first introduced in 2008. The most widely used version today is on a mobile phone - with the authentication key held on a SIM card. In Iceland 95% of the eligible population (13 years or older) has an active eID, including 75% of over 75s. Icelandic eID holders used their eID more than 20 times a month in 2021.

During enrollment, users create a PIN. Each time they need to identify, verify or sign something online, a prompt via flash SMS is initiated and the PIN code is validated. Today this system is used by all banks, government services (island.is portal), healthcare, eductation, document signing and over 300 private companies using for customer page logins (linked to the Icelandic ID no.). Since the only thing to remember is one's PIN code and their phone, it is very prevalent, and works as a sort of single-sign-on service. They are administered by Auðkenni hf., which was initially created by a consortium of banks but is now owned by the government.

The first form of the system in 2008 was a special smartcard with an EMV chip, paired with a smartcard reader on the client's computer. The smartcard was first introduced in late 2008 for employees of government departments, large companies and the healthcare system. It was rolled out to all departments and companies handling sensitive data. It was also possible to store one's eID on a debit card. In November 2013 the SIM card implementation for mobile phones was introduced, which led to a much quicker take-up of eIDs due to its ease of use. By 2014, 40% of Icelanders were using eIDs.

=== Italy ===
Italy introduced its electronic identity cards, called Carta d'Identità Elettronica (in Italy identified with the acronym CIE), to replace the paper-based ID card in Italy. Since 4 July 2016, Italy is in the process of renewing all ID cards to electronic ID cards.

=== Latvia ===
eID and eSignature service provider in Latvia is called eParaksts

=== Malta ===
Since 12 February 2014, Malta is in the process of renewing all ID cards to electronic ID cards.

=== Netherlands ===
Electronic identities in Netherlands are called DigiD and Netherlands is currently developing an eID scheme.

=== Norway ===
Electronic identities in Norway issued by banks are called BankID (different than Sweden's BankID). They make it possible to log into Norwegian authorities, universities and banks, and to make larger payments using the Vipps mobile payment service, used by more than half of the population as of 2017.

=== Romania ===
Since 25 May 2023, Romanians are able to use their national ID to sign up to the RoEID application which allows them to access public services

=== Spain ===
Electronic identity cards in Spain are called DNIe and have been issued since 2006.

=== Switzerland ===
SwissID, developed by SwissSign, is a certified digital ID in Switzerland offered since 2017 (2010–17 as SuisseID). As a base for a new Federal Act on Electronic Identification Services (e-ID Act), an eID-concept had been developed by the authorities, yet experts criticized its technology part. The law was accepted by the Swiss parliament on 29 September 2019. It would have updated current legislation and would have continued to allow private companies or public organizations to issue eIDs if certified by a new federal authority. However, an optional referendum called for a public vote on this issue in the weeks until Sunday, 7 March 2021. The vote resulted in 35.6% Yes and 64.4% No, rejecting the proposed new law. In 2025, a revised version of the law was approved by the public with the eID becoming available in 2026.

SwissSign might develop the SwissID further, to make it compatible with future E-ID regulations.

=== Sweden ===
The most widespread electronic identification in Sweden is issued by banks and called BankID (different than Norwegian BankID). The BankID may be in the form of a certificate file on disk, on card or on smart phones. The latter (Swedish mobile BankID service) was used by 84 percent of the Swedish population in 2019. A Mobile BankID login does not require a fee since the service is provided by banks rather than mobile operators. It can be used both for authentication within various apps and web services on the same smart phone, and also for web pages on other devices. It also supports fingerprint and face recognition authentication on compatible iOS and Android devices.

Electronic IDs are used for secure web login to Swedish authorities, banks, health centers (allowing people to see their medical records and prescriptions and book doctors visits), and companies such as pharmacies. Mobile BankID also allows the Swish mobile payment service, utilized by 78 percent of the Swedish population in 2019, at first mainly for payments between individuals. BankID was previously used for university applications and admissions, but this was prohibited by Swedbank since universities utilized the system for distribution of their own student logins. Increasingly, BankID is used as an added security for signing contracts.

=== Usage of eID systems in Europe ===
The adoption of eIDs varies per EU Member State. While some countries mainly rely on government eID systems, others have dominant private or public-private systems, like eIDs managed by banks. The table below provides an overview over eID adoption in various countries.

Country	System Name	Type	Users	Notes
Austria	ID Austria	eIDAS	2,000,000	Replaced previous eIDs on 5 December 2023.
Belgium	itsme	eIDAS	7,000,000	
Denmark	MitID	eIDAS	5,400,000	
Finland	FTN	Bank Login	5,500,000	The Finnish Trust Network (FTN) is a network of banks, allowing to log into public and private services.
Estonia	ID-kaart, Mobiil-ID		1,405,000	
France	France Identité		43,000,000	Combination of a physical chip enabled ID card (Carte Nationale d'Identité or CNI as a short) with a ISO ID-1 profile and the mobile application France Identité that is setup thru a CNI. It also provides identity federation portal thru France Connect as well as multiple factor authentication thru France Connect + to access multiple administration websites. The app is also used as a digital wallet to store your credentials (driving licences, car documents, etc) and it can generate a document to prove your identity in a secure way without sending a copy of your documents (Justificatif d'identité à usage unique).
Germany	Personalausweis	eIDAS	11,600,000	Germany still relies on video identification and identification at postal offices. While every new ID card has an eID function, only 14% used the eID function in 2023.
Ireland	MyGovID	eIDAS	740,000	Limited to public services.
Italy	SPID	eIDAS	33,500,000	
Luxembourg	LuxTrust	eIDAS	500,000	
Netherlands	eDIN	Bank Login	16,000,000	
Norway	BankID	Bank Login	4,300,000	
Poland	e-dowod	eIDAS	13,800,000	
Poland	mojeID	Bank Login	22,000,000	
Spain	DNIe	eIDAS	38,000,000	
Sweden	BankID	Bank Login	8,500,000	

== eID in other countries ==
=== Afghanistan ===
Afghanistan issued its first electronic ID (e-ID) card on 3 May 2018. Afghan President Ashraf Ghani was the first to receive the card. Afghan President was accompanied by First Lady Rula Ghani, his VP, Head of Afghan Senate, Head of Afghan Parliament, Chief Justice and other senior government officials, and they also received their cards. As of January 2021, approximately 1.7 million Afghan citizens have obtained their e-ID cards.

=== Costa Rica ===
Costa Rica plans to introduce facial recognition data into its national identification card.

=== Guatemala ===
Guatemala introduced its electronic identity card called DPI (Documento Personal de Identificación) in August 2010.

=== Indonesia ===
Indonesia introduced its electronic identity cards, called e-KTP. Indonesian electronic ID was trialed in six areas in 2009 and launched nationwide in 2011.

=== Israel ===
Electronic identity cards in Israel have been issued since July 2013.

=== Kazakhstan ===
Kazakhstan introduced its electronic identity cards in 2009.

=== Mauritius ===
Mauritius has had electronic identity cards since 2013.

=== Mexico ===
Mexico had an intent to develop an official electronic biometric ID card for all youngsters under the age of 18 years and was called the Personal Identity Card (Record of Minors), which included the data verified on the birth certificate, including the names of the legal ascendant(s), a unique key of the Population Registry (CURP), a biometric facial recognition photograph, a scan of all 10 fingerprints, and an iris scan registration.

=== Nigeria ===
General Multi-purpose Electronic Identity Cards are issued by the National Identity Management Commission (NIMC), a Federal Government agency under the Presidency. The NeID Card complies with ICAO standard 9303, ISO standard 7816–4., as well as GVCP for the MasterCard-supported payment applet. NIMC plans to issue 50m multilayer-polycarbonate cards, the first set being contact only, but also dual-interface with DESFire Emulation in the near future.

=== Pakistan ===
Pakistan officially began its nationwide Computerized National Identity Card (CNIC) distribution in 2002, with over 89.5 x CNICs issued by 2012. In October 2012, the National Database and Registration Authority (NADRA) introduced the smart national identity card (SNIC), which contains a data chip and 36 security features. The SNIC complies with ICAO standard 9303 and ISO standard 7816–4. The SNIC can be used for both offline and online identification, voting, pension disbursement, social and financial inclusion programmes and other services. NADRA aims to replace all 89.5 million CNICs with SNICs by 2020.

=== Serbia ===
Serbia has its first trustful and reliable electronic identity since June 2019. The first reliable service provider is The Office for IT and eGovernment, through which citizens and residents of Serbia can access services on eGovernment Portal and eHealth portal. The electronic identification offers two levels of security, first basic level with authentication of only user name and password, and medium level of two-factor of authentication.

=== Sri Lanka ===
Since on 1 January 2016, Sri Lanka is in the process of developing a Smart Card based RFID E-National Identity Card which will replace the obsolete 'Laminated Type' cards by storing the holders information on a chip that can be read by banks, offices etc. thereby reducing the need to have documentation of these informations physically by storing in the cloud.

=== Turkey ===
In Turkey the e-Government (e-Devlet) Gateway is a largely scaled Internet site that provides access to all public services from a single point. The purpose of the Gateway is to present public services to the citizens, enterprises and public institutions effectively and efficiently with information and communication technologies.

=== Uruguay ===
Uruguay has had electronic identity cards since 2015. The Uruguayan eID has a private key that allows to digitally sign documents, and has the user fingerprint stored in order to allow to verify the identity. It is also a valid travel document in some South American countries. As of 2017 the old laminated ID coexists with the new eID.

== Manufacturing ==
Electronic identification can also be attributed to the manufacturing sector, where the technology of electronic identification is transferred to individual parts or components within a manufacturing facility in order to track, and identify these parts to enhance manufacturing efficiency. This can also be referred to location detection technologies within the Fourth Industrial Revolution.

== See also ==
- List of national identity card policies by country
- Digital wallet
- Mobile driver's license
- Self-sovereign identity
