= GoPago =

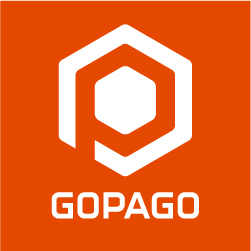
- Company type: Subsidiary
- Website type: Mobile Payments
- Headquarters: Pasadena, California, United States
- Founders: Leo Rocco; Vincenzo Di Nicola
- Parent: Verifone
- Website: gopago.com
- Launched: August 2011

GoPago (pronounced ‘go’-’PAY’-’go’) was a cloud-based mobile payment platform with an integrated point of sale system, based in Pasadena, CA. GoPago's payment platform allows customers to purchase orders in advance of arriving at brick-and-mortar merchants and merchants to manage orders in real-time. In August 2012, GoPago released GoPago LIVE, an application-based tablet point of sale system, which are free to merchants. GoPago's mobile payments platform is cloud-based, which allows transactions processing without near-field communications or QR-code technologies. On December 11, 2013, Amazon (Global Payment Services) reached an agreement with GoPago to buy a license to its technology and hire certain members of its engineering team. On December 20, 2013, mobile commerce company DoubleBeam acquired all of the assets of GoPago, including all customers, systems, products, brand name and IP portfolio. On February 20, 2015, DoubleBeam was acquired by Verifone, Inc, and GoPago was subsequently rebranded as Verifone Cloud POS.

== History ==
GoPago was originally conceived in 2007. Rocco believed there was a need to bridge the gap between merchants and customers. Specially, enabling consumers to skip the line and not have to wait to put in their order. This was the first true order ahead experience. For merchants it helped streamline operations and create more orders beyond walk in traffic. Customers should be able to easily and quickly order and purchase goods in advance through their mobile device, while merchants should be able to easily access and manage potential customers.

GoPago launched its mobile app on August 9, 2011, as Pago, in Mountain View, CA. After piloting with restaurants in Mountain View, Pago rebranded as GoPago and went live in San Francisco on April 3, 2012. GoPago has plans to expand to Dallas, New York, and cities across the U.S. GoPago also made an appearance working with food trucks inside the Microsoft Bing area at SxSW Interactive in March 2012.

== Products ==
=== Mobile Payments ===
GoPago's mobile app is available for iOS and Android. GoPago allows users to find participating merchants, browse their offerings, pre-order and pay from their smartphones. Users who pick up orders from brick-and-mortar merchants bypass the line and in-store preparation and payment process.

=== Mobile Storefront ===
Merchants manage a ‘mobile storefront,’ which is a digitized version of their brick-and-mortar offerings. Merchants are provided with a receipt printer and 4G-enabled tablet, through which they receive order details and manage their mobile storefront. Merchants track customer activity through the tablet and communicate back to customers about order status and special offers or discounts.

=== Point of Sale ===
GoPago LIVE launched on August 7, 2012. GoPago LIVE is a point of sale system that includes all necessary components to function as a plug-and-play POS. GoPago LIVE includes a tablet that runs GoPago POS software, Verizon 4G internet connection, a cash drawer, credit card reader and receipt printer. GoPago's POS includes functionality to manage inventory, customer loyalty, reporting and is integrated with the mobile app and storefront, enabling merchants allow mobile ordering capabilities. GoPago LIVE is a cloud-based POS and charges a flat percent fee for each credit card transaction.

== Promotions ==
In July 2012, GoPago launched social media campaigns in partnership with San Francisco Giants pitcher Tim Lincecum and again in September 2012 with 49ers tight end Vernon Davis. Lincecum and Davis thanked their fans with a free lunch through Facebook and Twitter, providing promotional codes that users could redeem at any merchant on GoPago's platform.

== Awards and recognition ==
On October 25, 2012, GoPago was recognized by the San Francisco Chamber of Commerce as one of San Francisco's most innovative companies. GoPago received the 2012 Comcast Innovation Through Technology Excellence in Business Award at the 21st Annual Ebbies Awards Gala. On March 21, 2013, GoPago received the PYMNTS.com Innovator Award for Best POS.

== Financials ==
On February 22, 2012, JPMorgan Chase announced an investment of an undisclosed amount in GoPago as the first financial services company to partner with GoPago. Chase Paymentech is the processor for GoPago transactions.
