= BankID (Sweden) =

Electronic personal identification service in Sweden

- Developer: Finansiell ID-Teknik BID AB
- Release: 2003; 23 years ago
- Operating system: Android (and Android Go), iOS, Mac OS X, Windows
- Available in: Swedish and English
- Type: Electronic identification
- Website: bankid.com

Finansiell ID-Teknik BID AB
- Industry: Information technology
- Founded: 2001; 25 years ago
- Headquarters: Stockholm, Sweden
- Products: BankID
- Owner: Danske Bank; Handelsbanken; Ikano Bank; Länsförsäkringar Bank; SEB; Skandiabanken; Swedbank
- Number of employees: 22 (2018)
- Website: bankid.com/om-oss
- Footnotes; Organization number: 556630-4928

BankID is an electronic identification system in Sweden. With a usage rate of 94% (2019) among smartphone users, it is the single largest such service in Sweden by a large margin, and is administered by Finansiell ID-Teknik BID AB that is owned by several Swedish and Scandinavian banks. In 2022, Bank-id had about 8.4 million active users and was supported by over 6000 web services. Only individuals with a Swedish personal identity number can acquire Bank-id.

Bank-id has existed in following variations:

- Bank-id on file (on computer)
- Bank-id on card (connected to a token device)
- Mobile Bank-id (mobile based implementation)
- Bank-id in mobile (a discontinued SIM card based implementation)

Example of usage areas are Swish payments, bank login, login to e-government, and access to medical records via Vårdguiden 1177.

There is also a separate personal electronic identification service in Norway that goes by the name BankID developed and released by Norwegian banks in 2004, and while it functions similarly, it is completely independent from the Swedish BankID.

== Variations ==
=== Bank-id on file ===
The service BankID, also called BankID på fil, was launched in 2003. A soft certificate and a secret encryption key is stored on the computer's hard drive, and still works even if the files are moved between computers, which might be a security risk.

To use Bank-id on a personal computer it is required that Bank-id säkerhetsprogram (BISP) is installed on the system where the files are stored. Criticism has pointed out that it is an overly platform dependent solution that requires the customers to either have Microsoft Windows or Mac OS X. Early versions included support for Linux, but were phased out in 2014.

=== Bank-id on card ===
Bank-id på kort (English: Bank-id on card) was launched in 2005. A secret cryptographic key is stored in the smart card's chip, that works like a hard certificate, which is regarded as more secure as it usually will require physical access to the card for it to work. The card can be a bank card or a pure bank-id card. It can be delivered with or without a photograph, and can work as an identity document. This card works in tandem with a special card reader, called bankdosa or säkerhetsdosa, with a numeral keyboard to enter codes. Some banks have the chip integrated in the card reader so it works without a card. Bank-id on card works without any special software in the computer or mobile, but long codes need to be entered into the device. There is a special software to transfer codes via a USB cable.

=== Mobile bank-id ===
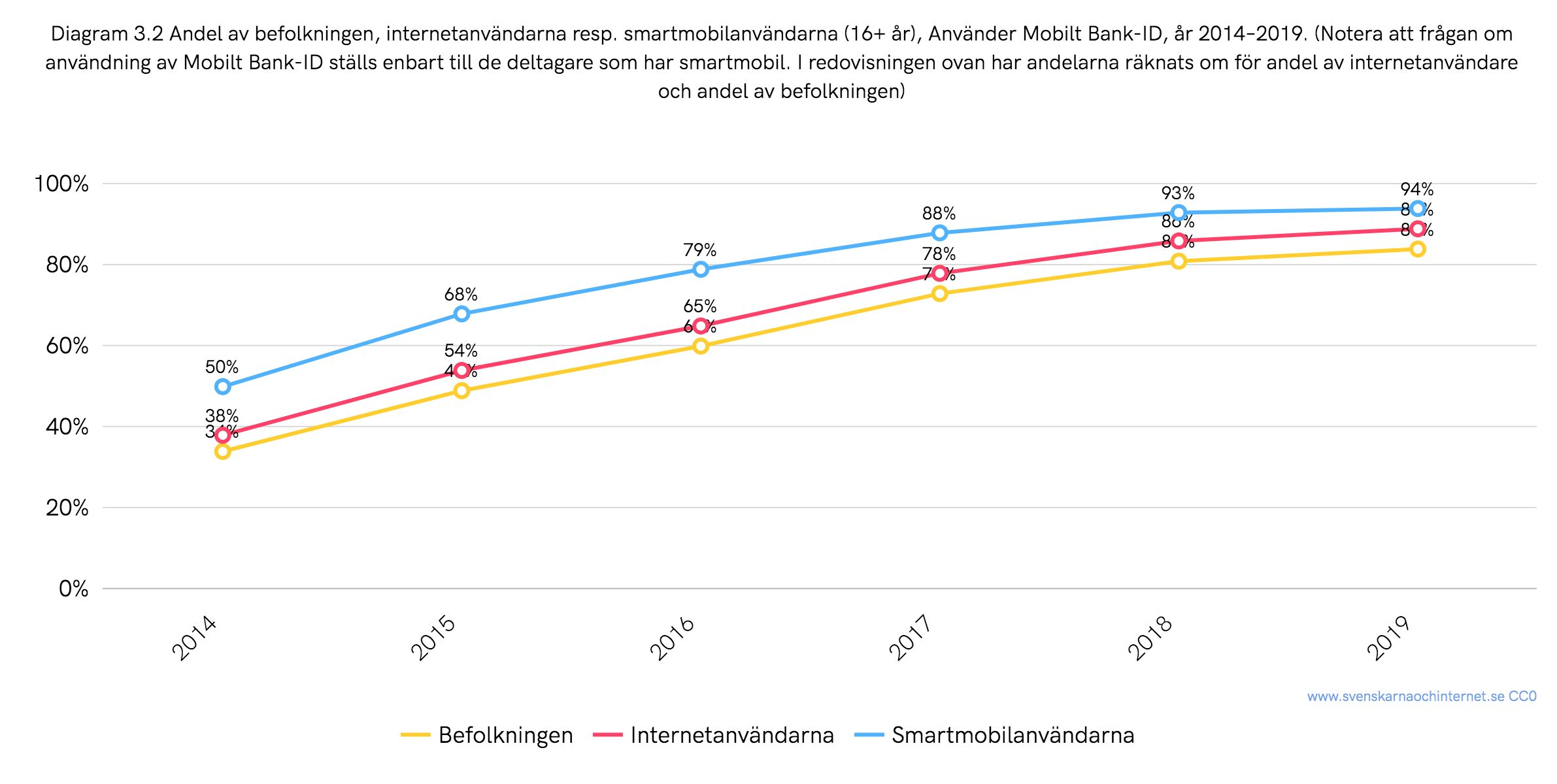
Percentage of Sweden's population (16+ years), Internet users, and smart mobile users, who use Mobilt Bank ID in the years 2014–2019. Figures from the survey "Swedes and the Internet".

Mobilt bank-id (English: Mobile bank-id) was launched in October 2011, and is an electronic identification for modern smartphones from certain manufacturers that is combined with a mobile application. It can be used as login or signing via the web on an ordinary PC, where the mobile device works as a separate security device ("säkerhetsdosa"), and for login via bank and government mobile applications. The secret cryptographic key is stored in the mobile application (Bank-id säkerhetsapp), that works as a soft certificate. The e-service supplier (the business or government the user shall identify themselves towards) have a validation server.

In 2014, about half of all smartphone users in Sweden used Mobile Bank-id. In five years the number of users almost doubled to 94 percent of all smartphone users. In 2019 all participating banks issued Mobile Bank-id, which does not apply to the other two implementations.

In 2022, the banking system in Sweden has introduced new security measures which in practice prevent most people who are not Swedish citizens (whether EU or non-EU) from renewing their mobile BankIDs. According to newspaper The Local, around 10% of the population (around 1 million individuals in Sweden) are affected.
