= Swish (payment) =

Mobile payment service

- Website type: Mobile payment
- Area served: Sweden
- Website: www.swish.nu
- Launched: 2012
- Native clients on: iOS, Android, Windows Phone

Swish (Swedish pronunciation: [swɪʂː] or [svɪʂː]) is a mobile payment system in Sweden. The service was launched in 2012 by six large Swedish banks, in cooperation with Bankgirot and the Central Bank of Sweden. It had 8 million users as of July 2022 (total Swedish population: 10.2 million).

== Overview ==
The service works through a smartphone application, through which the users' phone numbers are connected to their bank accounts, which makes it possible to transfer money in real time, a few seconds until confirmation is received by both parties. The user must have a second mobile application called Mobilt BankID Säkerhetsapp, which is an electronic identification issued by several banks in Sweden. This requires that the user has a bank account in a Swedish bank participating in the system, and also a national ID number. Users who have a Swedish bank account but no suitable phone can register for reception only of payments. The phone number can be of another country. The actual transfer is done by the Bankgirot clearing system, which developed instant payments for the Swish system.

Swish was originally intended for transactions between individuals, but soon it started to be used for flea markets and collections at church services, and by sports clubs and other organisations as payment at small events where a credit card reader would be too expensive or otherwise impractical. Small companies who wished to avoid credit card charges and simplify online payments soon followed suit. In 2014 organisations could register for receiving payments, although some organisations used a private bank account of someone in the organisation before that. In January 2017 Swish was launched for web based sales which quickly became popular, for example used by the train operator SJ. It is possible to pay by scanning a QR code.

Prior to the implementation of Swish, cash was the primary means for many of these types of real-time transactions. As such, Swish is used for transactions that used to be mostly cash-based.

The service is free for private users since the start 2012. Companies and registered organisations pay around 1–3 SEK (depending on bank) per received payment in addition to a small yearly fee, and are not allowed to charge the customer for their Swish fee. Since Swish has a near monopoly on instant phone payments in Sweden, banks must set fees independently to ensure competitive pricing. Since the minimum Swish payment (currently 1 SEK but depends on the bank) may be lower than the fee, an organisation may lose money if many small Swish payments are made to it. In some cases of media attention towards such cases banks have donated their Swish profit to the organisations.

The lower age limit has by several banks been removed for Swish and card usage, as part of the plans from banks to remove cash usage. There are limitations for children below 16, such as max 2000 kr per day for Swish.

Swish is a member of the European Mobile Payment Systems Association. All Swish payments are settled through RIX-INST, a settlement system for instant payments that is operated by Sveriges Riksbank and connected to the Eurosystem's TARGET Instant Payment Settlement (TIPS) system.

== See also ==
- Vipps – another mobile payment service available in Sweden and Norway
- MobilePay – mobile payment service available in Denmark and Finland
- PayPal
- Single Euro Payments Area (SEPA)
- Venmo – mobile payment service available in the US
- Wero – mobile payment service available in Belgium, France, Germany, and Luxembourg
