= SOM Institute =

The SOM Institute is a survey research organisation at the University of Gothenburg. It was started in 1986.
