= NCC Group =

British technology company

NCC Group PLC
- Type: Public limited company
- Traded as: LSE: NCC; FTSE 250 component
- ISIN: GB00B01QGK86
- Industry: Cyber security
- Founded: 1999
- Headquarters: Manchester, United Kingdom
- Number of locations: Over 35 (2020)
- Area served: Worldwide
- Key people: Chris Stone (Chairman); Guy Ellis (CEO)
- Revenue: ▼£238.9 million (2025)
- Operating income: ▲£(6.1) million (2025)
- Net income: ▲£17.1 million (2025)
- Number of employees: 2,140 (2025)
- Website: www.nccgroup.com

NCC Group is an information assurance firm headquartered in Manchester, United Kingdom. Its service areas cover cyber security consulting and managed services. NCC Group claims over 15,000 clients worldwide. The company is listed on the London Stock Exchange and is a constituent of the FTSE 250 Index.

== History ==
=== Formation and growth ===
NCC Group was formed in June 1999, when the National Computing Centre sold its commercial divisions to its existing management team supported by private equity firm ECI Ventures. This new company was named NCC Services Ltd and was renamed NCC Group Ltd in May 2000. In 2000, Rob Cotton was hired as finance director and subsequently took responsibility for the Group's escrow division. In 2003 he led a secondary management buyout and became chief executive of NCC Group Ltd. This valued the Group at £30 million and was supported by Barclays Private Equity.

On 12 July 2004, NCC Group was admitted to trading on AIM, with the flotation raising £38.1 million before expenses. After rapid expansion, in July 2007 the Group made the move to the London Stock Exchange's main market.

In August 2020, training materials, from NCC Group, a founding member of the cyber security certification body CREST, including practical examination “cheat sheets” for the CREST CCT INF and CCT APP examinations were leaked on to the GitHub and Dropbox platforms. The leaked documents described internal training procedures involving “cloned examination rigs” and offered step by step walkthroughs of CREST examinations. Due to the breach of exam integrity CREST suspended practical examinations and in a statement said it "will be appointing an independent investigative panel.”

In May 2026, NCC Group completed the sale of its Escode business to TDR Capital.

On 27 October 2026, it was announced by the company that the former CFO, Guy Ellis, would be appointed CEO.

=== Top level domain operations ===
In 2012 NCC Group announced the investment of £6 million over 15 months in a wholly owned subsidiary, Artemis Internet. This was used to apply for a new .secure generic Top Level Domain (gTLD) and develop an associated security programme. The application was subsequently abandoned and .secure was assigned to a different applicant. In 2014 NCC Group acquired the right to operate the generic Top Level Domain (gTLD) .trust from Deutsche Post.

=== Acquisitions ===
NCC Group has expanded through a mixture of organic growth and acquisitions:

- 2006 Recall Total Information Management's escrow division
- 2006 Source Harbor
- 2007 Secure Test
- 2007 Site Confidence
- 2008 Escrow Europe
- 2008 Next Generation Security Software (NGS)
- 2010 iSEC Partners Inc
- 2010 SDLC Solutions
- 2010 Meridian Services International
- 2011 Axzona Ltd
- 2011 Escrow Associates
- 2012 Matasano Security
- 2012 Intrepidus Group
- 2014 FortConsult A/S
- 2015 Open Registry Group
- 2015 Accumuli
- 2015 Fox-IT
- 2016 Payment Software Company, Inc.
- 2016 VSR, Inc.
- 2021 Iron Mountain's Intellectual Property Management business
- 2022 Adelard LLP
