= Vipps =

Mobile payment application

- Industry: Mobile payment
- Founded: 2015; 11 years ago
- Headquarters: Oslo, Norway
- Area served: Norway and Sweden
- Owner: Vipps MobilePay AS
- Number of employees: 256
- Website: vipps.no (Norway) vipps.se (Sweden)

Vipps is a Norwegian mobile payment application designed for smartphones originally developed by DNB. Vipps was released May 30, 2015 and, having reached 1 million users by November 5, 2015, Vipps became Norway's largest payment application. Although Vipps was developed by DNB, customers of any Norwegian bank can use it. Vipps is a member of the European Mobile Payment Systems Association.

Vipps merged with MobilePay of Denmark and Finland in 2022 to form Vipps MobilePay. The headquarters of the new company is in the Norwegian capital of Oslo, but all locations in other countries and the separate brand names are maintained. A collection of Norwegian banks own 72.2% of Vipps MobilePay, while Danske Bank owns 27.8%.

As of 2022, Vipps had 4.2 million users in Norway (total population: 5.4 million), whereas MobilePay had more than 4.4 million users in Denmark (total population: 5.8 million) and more than 2 million users in Finland (total population: 5.5 million).

In May 2025, Vipps signed a letter of intent to join the European Payments Alliance (EuroPA), an initiative to provide interoperable mobile payment solutions throughout Europe, launched by Italian, Spanish and Portuguese firms.

== Service ==
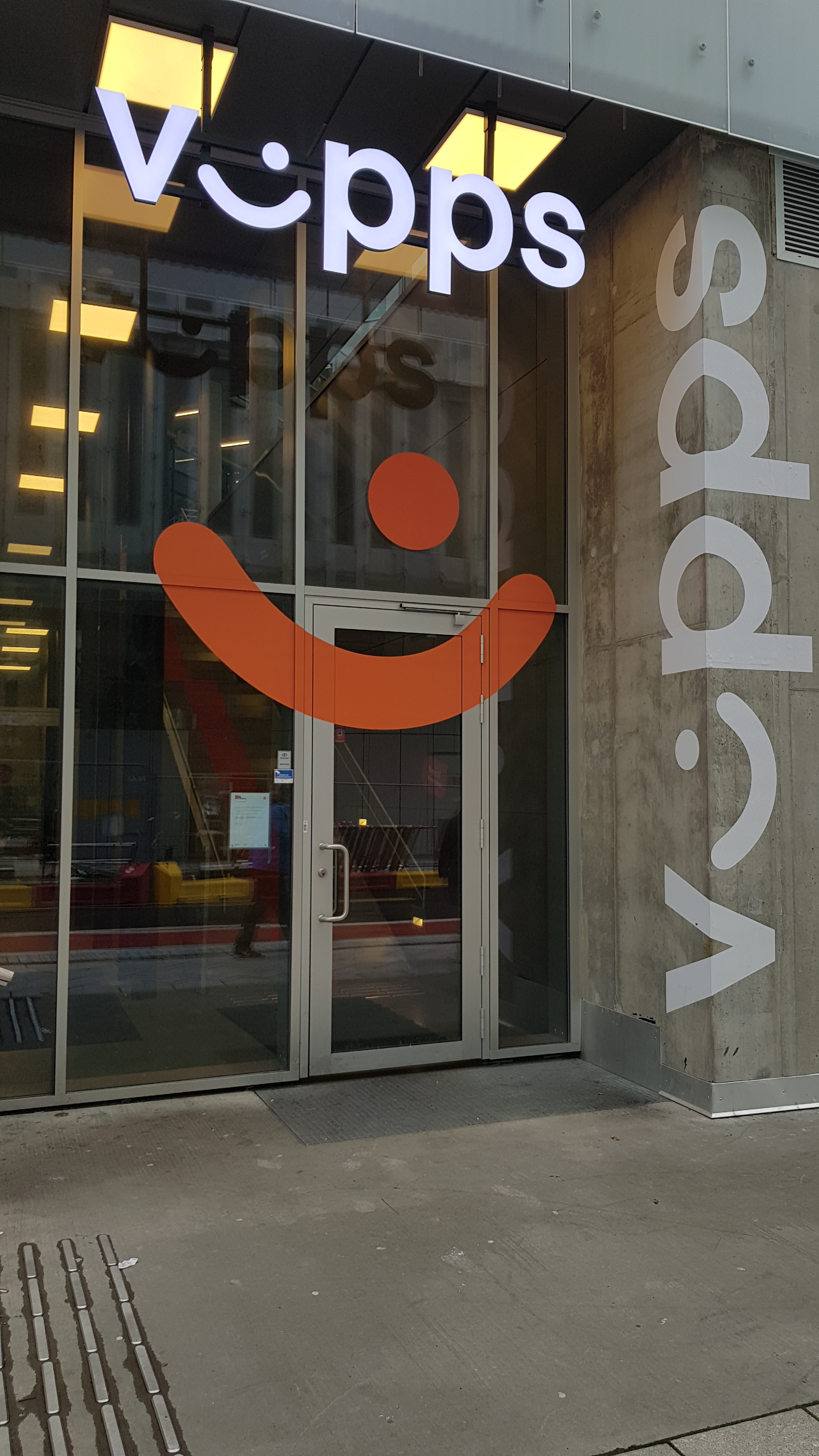
Vipps headquarters in Oslo, 2019

Vipps is an application that gives the user the ability to make payments to a receiver's telephone number instead of an account number. If the receiver has a bank account in one of the owner banks of Vipps, the money is confirmed and available for the receiver within seconds. Other receivers have to register their credit card in Vipps and will get the money the next bank day. If a payment is made to a phone number not connected to Vipps, the receiver will get an SMS instructing them to download the application. If they do not, the payment will be cancelled. It is possible to send a request for payment, a kind of bill.

The application is designed for smartphones (newer iOS or Android versions, not Windows anymore). After downloading the Vipps application, there is an onboarding-process where the user assigns a credit- or debit card (Visa/MasterCard), personal- and account information. After registration, the user's account information is connected to the user's mobile telephone number. Each user must register a phone number, bank account, credit card and identity number, and all must be Norwegian.

Transfers under 5000 NOK are free. For larger transfers, Vipps charges the sender 1% of the total amount. The receiver never pays any fees.

== Security ==
Vipps is protected by a user-defined four-digit identification code. For payments exceeding 2000 NOK, the application launches the Norwegian BankID electronic identification for user authentication. There are also security checks in the applications during registration and payment. The phone numbers have no check digit but the name of receiver is shown before the payment is confirmed, provided the receiver has a Vipps account. If the receiver has no Vipps account, the sender must make sure the phone number is correct.

== Social Payments ==
The users can add a user-image to their profile which will be visible to other users and in addition to payments the application lets users chat with each other.

== History ==
- November 2022 - Merger between Vipps and MobilePay is finalized.
- June 2021 - It is announced that Vipps, the Danish service MobilePay (also used in Finland) and the Finnish service Pivo will join into one company and one technical solution, however keeping brand names. However, Pivo withdrew from the merger in September 2022 due to competition concerns raised by the European Commission.
- October 2017 - Danske Bank and Nordea gets partial ownership of Vipps. They owned the competing system MobilePay which is leading in Denmark, but now gets closed down in Norway.
- February 2017 – Ownership of Vipps is transferred from DNB to a separate company, owned by multiple bank, but still DNB as the leading owner.
- December 14, 2015 – Update V1.2 making Vipps available on Apple Watch, but this is later closed down.
- November 5, 2015 – Vipps reaching 1 million users making it the largest payment-app in Norway.
- October 5, 2015 – First update V1.1 included TouchID, multiple cards and “demand payment”.
- September 18, 2015 – Dinside.no announced Vipps “best in test" when Din Side tests Norway's 3 largest payment applications; Vipps, MobilePay and mCash.
- June 2, 2015 – Dinside.no writes the article "This is why you don't need Vipps"
- May 30, 2015 – Vipps is released and made available in the App Store, Google Play and the Windows Store.

== See also ==
- Swish – Another mobile payment service available in Sweden
