= PKIoverheid =

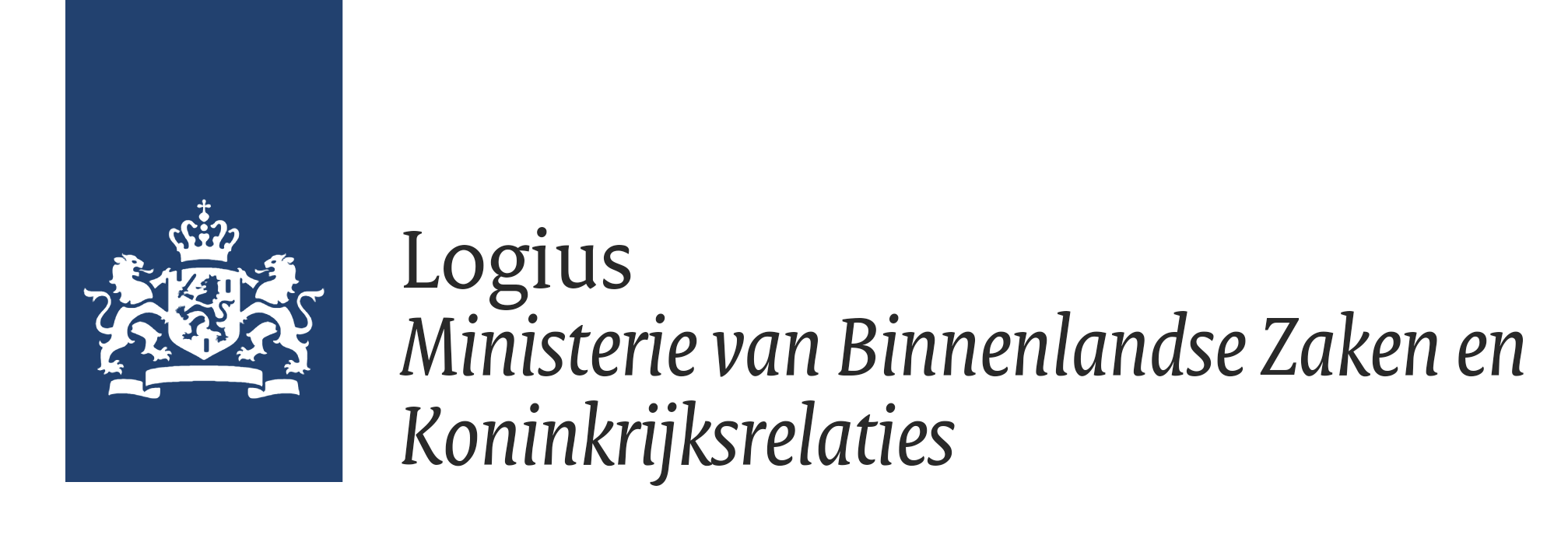
- Developer: Logius
- Type: Certificate authority
- Discontinued: 2021
- Status: Operating
- Website: pkioverheid.nl

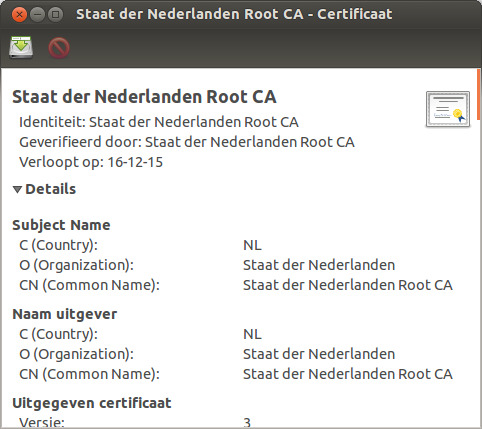
PKIoverheid certificate hierarchy

Earlier logo

PKIoverheid is the public key infrastructure (PKI) from the Dutch government. Like any other PKI, the system issues and manages digital certificates such that they can be realized. PKIoverheid is run by Logius.
