= MobilePay =

Payment application in Denmark and Finland

- Industry: Mobile payment
- Founded: 2013
- Headquarters: Oslo, Norway
- Area served: Denmark and Finland
- Owner: Vipps MobilePay AS
- Website: mobilepay.dk (Denmark) mobilepay.fi (Finland)

MobilePay is a mobile payment application used in Denmark and Finland. The service allows payments by means of a smartphone application and was first introduced in 2013 by Danske Bank. It was introduced to Finland later in the same year and since 2017 it has been used by all banks in Denmark. As of 2022, MobilePay had more than 4.4 million users in Denmark (total population: 5.8 million) and more than 2 million users in Finland (total population: 5.5 million). This corresponds to 75.86% of the Danish population and 36.36% of the Finnish one. In 2022, MobilePay merged with Vipps of Norway to form Vipps MobilePay, but they maintain their separate brand names in each country (until 2027). MobilePay is a member of the European Mobile Payment Systems Association.

== Function ==
MobilePay is an application for phones with operating systems iOS and Android. MobilePay is a digital wallet covering all payment needs. Payments can be made to friends, smaller physical shops, supermarkets and larger chains, recurring payments, ecommerce and mcommerce and donations. By downloading this application, users are required to connect a credit card and account information to their mobile number. Money transfers are performed by entering a mobile phone number which is registered in the system. The funds are then transferred to this account, while the amount is deducted from the sender's credit card. There are no fees for private MobilePay accounts.

=== Security ===
The application is protected by a user-selected four-digit PIN code or a fingerprint. Initially, the login id was either the CPR-number (national id number) or the more secure NemID, but since 2023 either NemID or the newer MitID (using CPR-number is no longer possible).

=== Requirements in Denmark and Finland ===
Users must be resident in Denmark, have an Android or iPhone smartphone with a Danish phone number, a Danish CPR-number, a Danish bank account with a card, and be at least 13 years old. Private people can only have one MobilePay account. Companies and people doing business can have a business account, which has fees (around DKK 0.30-0.80 per transaction).

Users in Finland must be at least 15 years old, have a mobile phone with a Finnish phone number, a Finnish Personal Identity Code, a permanent address in the European Economic Area and a working email address. Means for strong authentication are also required, for example banking credentials, an ID card or the mobile certificate.

== History ==
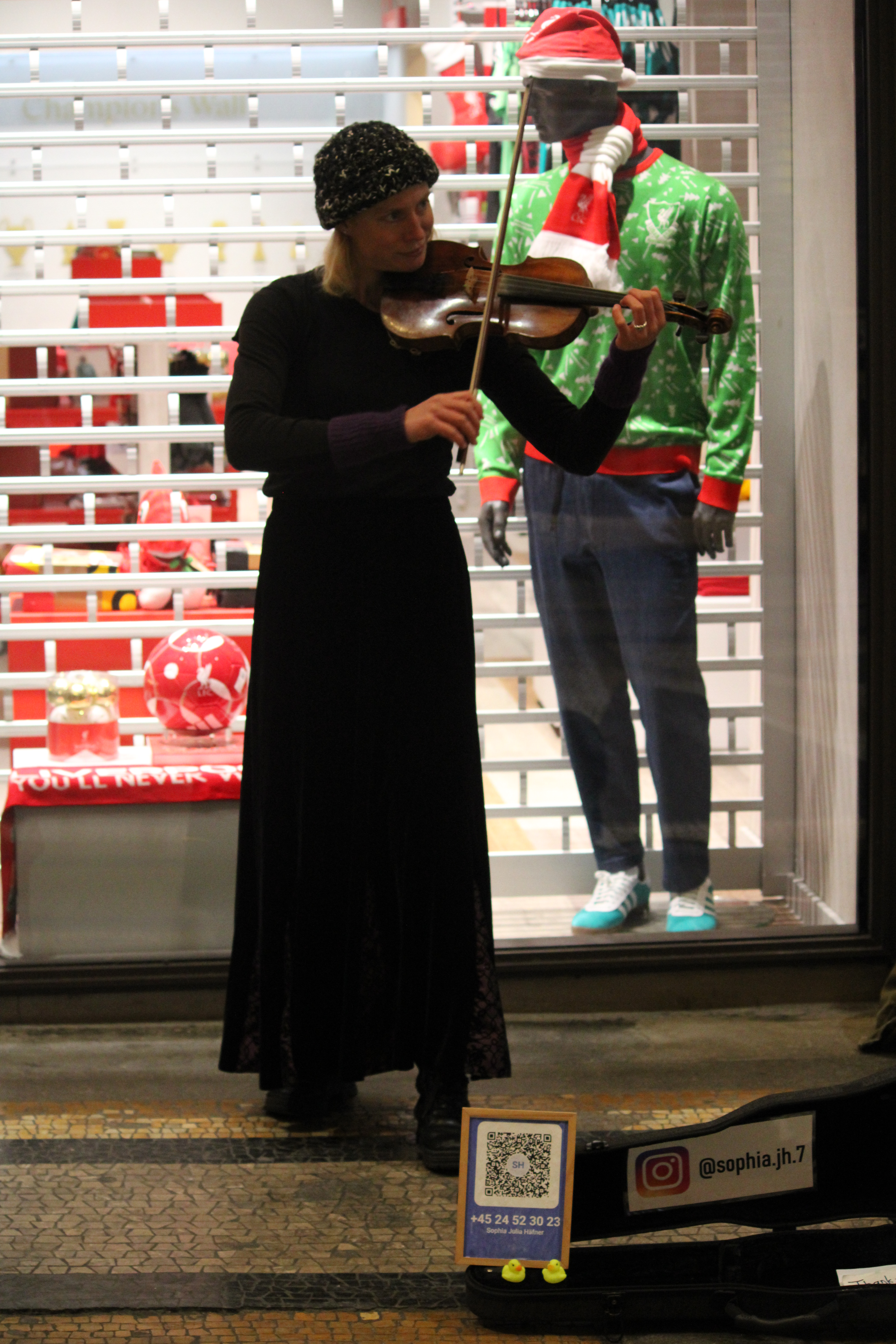
A street violinist accepting MobilePay in Copenhagen, 2025

Payment via mobile phones first became popular in Denmark, when DSB and the other traffic operators in the Copenhagen metropolitan area launched ticketing via SMS in January 2009, which worked as an extension of a similar system in Funen.

In 2012, the banks in Denmark started a joint project for a new system. Danske Bank chose to discontinue the cooperation at the end of 2012, quoting among other reasons that the joint system would not be usable outside of Denmark. Originally, Danske Bank intended to offer MobilePay free of charge until the end of 2013, but then decided to let the system remain free of charge for private users even after this date.

On 7 May 2013, Danske Bank launched MobilePay, which by the end of 2013 had been installed 877.000 times. The cooperation between the other banks was named Swipp and was launched on June 13, 2013. In February 2017, Swipp closed and all Danish banks transferred to using MobilePay.

=== Expansion beyond Denmark and merger with Vipps ===
MobilePay was introduced in Finland in December 2013, in Norway in August 2015 and in Greenland in August 2020. In January 2018, MobilePay discontinued all services in Norway. Mobile pay is not available in the Faroe Islands (an autonomous part of the Danish Realm, like Greenland).

In June 2021, it was announced that MobilePay, the Norwegian service Vipps and the Finnish service Pivo were planning on merging into one company and one technology, however keeping their separate brand names. In 2022, it was announced that following a review by the European Commission's Directorate-General for Competition, Finnish service Pivo would not be part of the merger. The new company is named Vipps MobilePay. As of 2022, MobilePay had more than 4.4 million users in Denmark and more than 2 million users in Finland, whereas Vipps of Norway had 4.2 million users. In comparison, each of these three countries have 5.4–5.8 million inhabitants.

== See also ==
- Vipps – Mobile payment service in Norway and Sweden
- Swish – Another mobile payment service in Sweden
