= Bold =

Bold most commonly refers to:

- Bold (typography), a font style used for emphasis, also known as boldface
- Boldness, or being bold, a human attitude, the opposite of being shy

Bold or BOLD may also refer to:

== Businesses and products ==
- Bold (detergent), a brand of laundry detergent
- BlackBerry Bold, a smartphone

== Military ==
- HMS Bold (1801), a gun-brig that ran aground and was broken up in 1811
- HMS Bold (1812), a gun-brig that was wrecked in 1813
- HMS Manly (1804) or HMS Bold, a ship that was sold in 1814
- USS Bold (BAT-8) or HMS Bold (W114), a tugboat transferred to the United Kingdom in 1942
- USS Bold (AMc-67), a minesweeper laid down in 1941
- USS Bold (AM-424), a minesweeper launched in 1953
- USNS Bold (T-AGOS-12)
- Bold (decoy), a German World War II sonar decoy

== Places ==
- Bold, St Helens, a civil parish in Merseyside, England
- Bold Cove, Falkland Islands
- Bold Street, Liverpool
- Bold Park, an urban bushland area in Perth, Western Australia
- Bold (river), a tributary of the Buzău in Romania

== Television ==
- Bold (TV channel), a Canadian television channel
- 10 Bold, an Australian television channel
- The Bold and the Beautiful or Bold, a TV soap opera

== People ==
- List of people known as the Bold
- Bold (surname), a surname, includes a list of people with the surname
- Bold (Mongolian name), a given name, includes a list of people with the name
- Bolad (given name) or Bold, an Inner Asian given name

== Music ==
- Bold (Angie & Debbie Winans album), a 1997 religious music album
- Bold (band), an American hardcore punk band
- Bold (EP), by Mary Lambert, 2017
- "Bold", a song by Kerfuffle from Links, 2006
- "Bold", a song by Jane Zhang from Reform, 2011
- "Bold", a song by The Alchemist from My 1st Chemistry Set, 2013
- "Bold", a song by Liam Gallagher from As You Were, 2017
- "Bold", a song by Jen Ledger from Ledger, 2018
- "Bold", a song by Wrest, 2021

== Science and technology ==
- Barcode of Life Data System, a DNA sequence database
- Blood-oxygen-level dependent, a method used in functional magnetic resonance imaging
- Bureau of Legal Dentistry, a forensic dentistry organization in Vancouver, British Columbia
- Biological Oxidant and Life Detection, a proposed spacecraft

== Other uses ==
- Bold (book) or Bold: How to Go Big, Create Wealth, and Impact the World, a book by Peter Diamandis
- Bold (horse), an American Thoroughbred racehorse
- Black Organization for Leadership Development, a Louisiana political group

== See also ==
- Bald (disambiguation)
- Boldi
