= Bold (surname) =

Bold is a surname. Notable people with the name include:

- Aaron Bold (born 1985), Canadian lacrosse player
- Alan Bold (1943–1998), Scottish writer
- Charlie Bold (1894–1978), Swedish baseball player
- Edgar Bold (1899–1965), New Zealand cricketer
- Emily Bold (born 1980), German writer
- Gary Bold (1938–2018), New Zealand physicist
- Gina Bold (born 1959), English artist
- Harold Charles Bold (1909–1987), American botanist
- Hugh Bold (1731–1809), Welsh lawyer
- Samuel Bold (1649–1737), English clergyman
- William Bold (1873–1953), Australian urban planner

== See also ==
- Adolfo J. de Bold (1942–2021), Argentinian-born Canadian cardiovascular researcher
- Kathleen DeBold (1955–2022), American LGBT activist and advocate
- Bold (Mongolian name)
- List of people known as the Bold
