= USS Bold =

Four ships of the United States Navy have been named Bold.

- USS Bold (AMc-67), originally named Chief, was a minesweeper laid down on 27 August 1941 at South Bristol, Maine.
- USS Bold (BAT-8), was a tugboat transferred to the United Kingdom on 29 June 1942.
- USS Bold (AM-424), was a minesweeper laid down 12 December 1951 and launched 14 March 1953.
- USNS Bold (T-AGOS-12), was an ocean surveillance ship, commissioned as USNS Vigorous in 1989 and later renamed.
