= Project SCUM =

Tobacco industry marketing plan

Project SCUM was a plan proposed in 1995 by R. J. Reynolds Tobacco Company (RJR) to sell cigarettes to members of the "alternative lifestyle" areas of San Francisco, in particular the large number of gay people in the Castro and homeless people in the Tenderloin. The acronym "SCUM" officially stood for "subculture urban marketing". Perhaps recognizing the offensive nature of its label, the marketing plan was later renamed Project Sourdough.

== Project ==
An anti-smoking campaign called Truth targeted R. J. Reynolds for Project SCUM, arguing that it not only showed the usual exploitative tobacco marketing techniques but added to them an explicit contempt or even hatred for the people it was trying to market its products to. SF Weekly reported:

"This is a hate crime, plain and simple," said Kathleen DeBold, director of the Washington, D.C.–based Mautner Project for Lesbians With Cancer. "What else do you call it when a group thinks of gays and lesbians as 'scum', and then targets us with something that kills?"

San Francisco Supervisor Chris Daly, who represents the Tenderloin District, is equally upset. "It's racist, it's classist, it's oppressive. And it is really disheartening to hear. But I can't say that I am surprised. Low-income communities and people of color have always been derided and taken advantage of. Obviously, the tobacco companies feel like they can make money off other people's misery."

Project SCUM documents came to light after a court order forced R. J. Reynolds to hand them over during the State of California's litigation against tobacco companies. R. J. Reynolds's marketing in the 1990s of its Camel and Winston cigarette brands drew the attention of attorneys representing California cities and counties. Project SCUM highlighted how tobacco companies in the 1990s were targeting young adults to be lifetime smokers.

Revelations about Project SCUM were among the mountains of evidence ensuring that anti-tobacco litigation would continue. In 1998, a resolution of the litigation came about in the Master Settlement Agreement between more than 40 state attorneys general and the tobacco industry.

== See also ==
- American Legacy Foundation
- Operation Berkshire
- "Truth" ad campaign
- Tobacco Master Settlement Agreement
