= Warren Braren =

Warren Braren (September 2, 1931 – August 17, 2015) was a consumer protection advocate in the United States.

In his early career Braren worked at Ted Bates advertising firm. In 1960 he began work as manager at the National Association of Broadcasters where he stayed till 1969. While there, Braren began to criticize that the industry self-regulation regarding tobacco advertising was ineffective and that it led to youth smoking. In June 1970 Braren testified to the United States Congress by sharing confidential industry documents which demonstrated industry awareness that the tobacco ads targeted young people. Braren said that broadcasters were unwilling to regulate themselves, and would do whatever benefited the financial interests of those who purchased advertising. This led to the ban on tobacco ads on television, in the Public Health Cigarette Smoking Act of 1970. In 1971 Braren worked at the National Citizens Committee for Broadcasting. After leaving the National Association of Broadcasters Braren worked at Consumers Union were among other things, he advocated for restrictions on advertising to children. Later Braren worked at the Times Mirror Company.

Braren spoke on behalf of Consumers Union on various occasions, including in 1971 about advertising to children, in 1973 about the safety of microwave ovens, in 1977 at a meeting of the National Cable & Telecommunications Association regarding cable television in the United States.
