= INFOTAB =

Lobbying group for the cigarette industry

The International Tobacco Information Center, known as INFOTAB, was an international lobbying organisation for the cigarette industry, based in Brussels.

== History ==
INFOTAB developed through four main stages. The initial program to set up a joint lobby by the competing cigarette manufacturers was known by the code-name Operation Berkshire, and was established in 1977.

The first organisation with staff was established by Mary Covington on loan from Philip Morris, and was named the International Committee on Smoking Issues (ICOSI). Its main operating subcommittee was the Social Acceptability Working Party (SAWP) which sought ways to make smoking more acceptable to non-smokers. The Director was Julian Doyle, a former MP in the Australian parliament.

ICOSI was transformed into INFOTAB in 1984, when funding and staffing for the organisation was increased, and it was tasked to resist the growing political pressure on the tobacco industry from the European Community, the World Health Organization (WHO) and the International Labour Organization (ILO). The WHO in particular had a highly active anti-smoking program. The main director of INFOTAB was Bryan C. Simpson, an Australian newspaper executive.

In the November 1998, the Master Settlement Agreement was signed between the Clinton Administration, the US States Attorneys General and the tobacco industry. INFOTAB was supposed to be wound up as part of this agreement, but many of its functions were simply transferred to the Tobacco Documentation Center, which was by then a global organisation with database operations in various countries, based initially on the Brussels INFOTAB database division.
