= Operation Berkshire =

Disinformation campaign by the tobacco industry

Operation Berkshire is the name of a program initiated in 1976 by seven of the world's major tobacco companies aimed at promoting "controversy" over and to cast doubt on the link between smoking and disease, for the purpose of delaying or undermining attempts at instituting tobacco control laws.

== Description ==
At the invitation of Tony Garrett, the Chairman of Imperial Tobacco, the CEOs of the seven largest tobacco companies met in secret in June 1977 at Shockerwick House in the United Kingdom "to develop a defensive smoking and health strategy, to avoid our countries and/or companies being picked off one by one, with a resultant domino effect." They agreed to create a front organization, the International Committee on Smoking Issues (ICOSI) (renamed the International Tobacco Information Centre, INFOTAB, in 1981), which operated through an internationally coordinated network of national manufacturers' associations to delay measures for tobacco control.

The purpose of ICOSI/INFOTAB is described in a document entitled "Conspiracy Notebook" produced by Brown & Williamson in the context of the US racketeering lawsuit against tobacco companies:

The American tobacco industry, working with its counterparts in other countries around the world, organised ICOSI, later renamed INFOTAB for the purpose of coordinating the worldwide response of the industry to anti-tobacco activities. INFOTAB was used to formulate and publish a consensus position on the part of the industry. It monitored anti-tobacco organizations. It created an information service for the purpose of accumulating and disseminating intelligence on anti-smoking activities. It was used to identify and enlist allies around the world for the tobacco industry, to perform studies and research whose results would be helpful, and to rebut data and allegations from anti-smoking forces. The organization worked closely with TI [the Tobacco Institute, an industry front organization disbanded in 1998] in carrying out this mission.

Tobacco companies, via their participation in the National Cancer Institute Tobacco Working Group, opposed the funding of such projects as tobacco cessation programs and also withheld knowledge about the effects of cigarettes.

The conspiracy was discovered in November 1998, as part of the Tobacco Master Settlement Agreement in the U.S. between the tobacco industry and various states' attorneys general. U.S. tobacco companies were compelled to publicly disclose approximately 40 million pages of previously confidential documents. During the course of the litigation by the Minnesota Attorney General (State of Minnesota, et al.), the district court ordered the domestic parties to establish a document depository in Minnesota for the documents produced in that action.

It was revealed that Operation Berkshire was created as a unified defensive strategy among international tobacco companies against anti-smoking legislation. The code name was initially suggested in a confidential memorandum to the then President of Philip Morris International, Hugh Cullman, by the then Chairman of Imperial Tobacco in the UK, Tony Garrett.

They agreed that they would not voluntarily make certain concessions about smoking and, if legislation was passed to force them, agreed they would sue. In particular, they decided that they would not concede the point that smoking has adverse health effects and would instead attempt to create controversy and doubt, lest they be held legally liable for the deaths of smokers. They also formulated coordinated activities to promote the social acceptability of smoking.

Similar behavior was demonstrated by the top seven biggest U.S. tobacco company CEOs, dubbed the "seven dwarfs", when they testified together before the U.S. Congress during a hearing on the regulation of tobacco products on April 14, 1994, when they collectively denied, under oath, the addictive nature of nicotine, despite at the time there being at least one published New York Times report claiming that nicotine has the ability to be more addictive than heroin, cocaine, or amphetamines. Several of the tobacco executives also further lied under oath, falsely stating that their companies did not manipulate the nicotine levels in their cigarettes.

== See also ==
- The Insider (film)
- Master Settlement Agreement
- Project SCUM
- Propaganda
- "Truth" ad campaign
