= Polat =

Polat is a Turkish name of Persian (Persian: پولاد) origin, meaning "steel". It may refer to:

== Given name ==
- Polat Kemboi Arıkan (born 1990), Turkish long distance runner of Kenyan origin
- Polat Keser (born 1985), German–Turkish football player
- Polat Kocaoğlu (born 1979), Turkish basketball player
- Polat Alemdar (born 1973), Main character of cult Turkish drama Valley of the Wolves
- Polat Yaldır (born 2003), Turkish footballer

== Surname ==
- Adnan Polat (born 1953), Turkish businessman and former president of the Galatasaray sports club
- Elif Polat (born 1999), Turkiah female sprinter
- Filiz Polat (born 1978), German politician of Turkish descent
- Lokman Polat (born 1956), Turkish-Swedish writer of Kurdish origin
- Mehmet Polat (born 1978), Turkish football player
- Rojin Polat (born 2004), Australian-Turkish women's footballer
- Uğur Polat (born 1961), Turkish actor
- Zümeyran Polat (born 1996), Turkish female wheelchair basketball player

== See also ==
- Bolad (given name)
- Polat Dam in Turkey
- Polat power station in Turkey
- Poladtuğay, a village in Azerbaijan
