= Operation Sweep Clear V =

Operation Sweep Clear V was a U.S. Navy fleet operation in Canadian waters during the Fall of 1960.

== See also ==
- USS Bold (AM-424)
