= InJustice =

- Directed by: Brian J. Kelly
- Produced by: Brian J. Kelly
- Release date: July 11, 2011
- Running time: 60 minutes
- Country: United States
- Language: English

InJustice is a 2011 documentary film produced and directed by Brian Kelly. The film features the impact of tort reform on the United States judicial system. The documentary focuses on how the class action lawsuit, born from the Civil Rights Act of 1964, was skillfully managed by a small group of trial attorneys who manipulated legal rules, procedures — and even their own clients — to become an international enterprise that rivals the scope and profits of Fortune 500 corporations. How lawyers managed to maneuver their way into millions and billions by scamming the judicial system via class action lawsuits.

== Cases discussed ==
The documentary portrays how trial attorneys set up for huge fees, luring ill or fearful plaintiffs into filing suit after suit are revealed. Later on, the scams were discovered and wiretapped conversations revealed evidence which resulted in sending three of the involved lawyers to federal prison.

Covered in the film are the cases related to asbestos and silicosis, Fen-Phen, and the tobacco settlements. The film features abuses done in the past by lawyers. Some cases like Dickie Scruggs of Mississippi who pleaded guilty to attempted bribery of a judge; Melvyn Weiss of New York who pleaded guilty to making illegal client kickbacks; and William Lerach of California who pleaded guilty to obstruction of justice are presented in the film.

== Critical reception ==
According to the American Bar Association's magazine ABA Journal, InJustice was created to offer a counterpoint to the documentary Hot Coffee, which aired on HBO and at Sundance in 2011. Most of the people portrayed in this film are lawyers and journalists. The movie was backed by the U.S. Chamber of Commerce.

== Screenings ==
- InJustice Executive Producer Brian Kelly was interviewed on CNBC’s Kudlow Report to discuss his film.
- The Fox News Radio program Kilmeade and Friends host Brian Kilmeade Brian interviewed Brian Kelly.
- In an article in Forbes magazine, Steve Forbes is cited as calling the film "riveting, fascinating," and "a revealing look under the hood of the American lawsuit industry."
