= Truth (anti-tobacco campaign) =

Anti-tobacco campaign

- Product type: Youth smoking prevention public education campaign
- Current owner: Truth Initiative
- Introduced: April 1998; 28 years ago
- Markets: United States
- Website: thetruth.com

Truth (stylized as truth) is an American public-relations campaign aimed at reducing teen smoking in the United States. It is conducted by the Truth Initiative (formerly called the American Legacy Foundation until 2015) and funded primarily by money obtained from the tobacco industry under the terms of the 1998 Master Settlement Agreement reached between 46 U.S. states and the four largest companies in the tobacco industry.

The Truth campaign includes television and digital content to encourage teens to reject tobacco and to unite against the tobacco industry. When the campaign was launched in 1998, the teen smoking rate was 23%. By 2023, the use of combustible tobacco products was down to 11.2%, but overall tobacco use was at 22.2% due to the rise of e-cigarette use among teens. In August 2014, a variation called "Finish It" was launched to assert that the current youth cohort should be the generation that ends smoking.

== History ==
=== Florida Tobacco Program 1998–2003 ===
The initial Truth campaign was developed by the Florida Tobacco Program, which ran from 1998 to 2003.

Through their marketing campaign, the program set out to drive a wedge between the tobacco industry's advertising and a youth audience. The program assembled a team of advertising and public relations firms and collaborated with Florida youth to develop a campaign that would effectively speak to their generation. Youth articulated their frustrations with the manipulative marketing tactics used by the tobacco industry and described their ideal campaign as one that would give them facts and the truth about tobacco. From this emerged the concept of uniting youth in a movement against tobacco companies promoted through grassroots advocacy and a youth-driven advertising campaign.

In March 1998, student delegates at a meeting sponsored by Florida's Office of Tobacco Control voted to change the theme of the campaign to "truth, a generation united against tobacco". In April 1998, Florida launched a $25 million advertising campaign that included 33 television commercials, seven billboards, eight print ads and four posters. With a target audience of youth aged 12–17, the Florida Truth campaign modeled their approach after commercial marketing to teens, and used messages that "attacked the [tobacco] industry and portrayed its executives as predatory, profit hungry, and manipulative". The ads attempted to re-frame tobacco as an addictive drug promoted by an adult establishment, and tobacco control as a hip, rebellious, youth-led movement. The campaign involved teenagers taking on the tobacco industry as part of the 13-day "Truth Train" tour across the state. However, reduced funding for the program, among other factors, ultimately led to the demise of Florida's Truth campaign. One of the notable leaders of this campaign was Cleveland Robinson, who was the first of 10 student leaders to lead the statewide campaign and part of the Truth Train leadership team.

=== American Legacy Foundation Truth campaign ===
As Florida's campaign diminished, in early 2000, the American Legacy Foundation adopted Florida's strategy and converted the Truth campaign into a national campaign. Generally consistent with Florida's campaign, the Truth Initiative's version of the campaign featured messages highlighting the deceptive practices of tobacco companies and facts about the deadly effects of tobacco.

== Campaign strategy and style ==
The campaign aims for a light-hearted tone in its advertisements. In contrast to the heavier tone adopted by many anti-tobacco campaigns, the strategy behind the Truth campaign is to emphasize the facts about tobacco products and industry marketing practices, without preaching or talking down to its target audience. The underlying theme is one of tobacco industry manipulation. With advertisements featuring youths confronting the tobacco industry, the Truth Initiative built a brand focused on empowering youth to construct positive, tobacco-free identities. Above all, the campaign avoids making directive statements telling youth not to smoke, and instead highlights alleged deceptive advertising practice and negative effects of tobacco use in order to persuade them to make that decision themselves. The campaign attempts to manipulate youths' desire to rebel and to assert their independence towards its tobacco use reduction goal.

Many of the advertisements produced for the Truth campaign focus on selectively chosen facts about the ingredients in cigarettes and the consequences of smoking, including addiction, disease, and death. A large portion of the material included in the Truth campaign advertisements were are highlights from tobacco industry documents that were made publicly accessible following the 1998 Master Settlement Agreement. The Truth Tobacco Documents Library, created in 2002 and managed by the University of California San Francisco, houses millions of formerly secret tobacco industry internal corporate documents.

=== Initial tactics and campaigns ===
The Truth campaign's initial objective was to "change social norms and reduce youth smoking." In building a strategy to accomplish this goal, the campaign designers looked to marketing and social science research and evidence from other successful campaigns and engaged in conversations with teen audiences. This research revealed that although youth were aware of the deadly nature of cigarettes, they were attracted to smoking as a tool for rebellion and empowerment. The campaign designers wanted to counter the appeal of cigarettes by encouraging teens to rebel against the duplicity and manipulation exhibited by tobacco companies.

Since the launch of the campaign in 1998, the campaign's management team has "utilized many different forms of media and evolved its tactics to ensure it reached the teen audience most effectively."

Arguably, the most recognized media produced for the Truth campaign are its television advertisements. For example, the Truth advertisement "1200" portrays a mass of youth walking up to a major tobacco company building, then suddenly collapsing as if dead while a single youth remains standing with a sign that reads, "Tobacco kills 1,200 people a day. Ever think about taking a day off?" In the "Body Bags" commercial, youth pile body bags on the sidewalk outside of Philip Morris's (now former) headquarters in New York City. One youth steps forward with a megaphone to shout up at the workers in the building, "...Do you know how many people tobacco kills every day? This is what 1200 people actually looks like." Another campaign advertisement, "Singing Cowboy", portrays a cowboy who has a breathing stoma (opening) in his neck singing, "you don't always die from tobacco, sometimes you just lose a lung", and other similar lyrics. A third commercial, "1 out of 3", uses "fantasized scenes such as an exploding soda can" to convey the message that tobacco is the only legal product that prematurely kills one out of three users. Perhaps one of truth's best-known campaigns, "Shards O' Glass", aired during Super Bowl XXXVII. The commercial showed an executive for a popsicle company, "Shards O' Glass", that provided disclaimers for their product – a popsicle with shards of glass in it, clearly unsafe and deadly – and posed the question, "What if all companies advertised like big tobacco?"

Through social media feedback and focus group testing, the campaign's designers concluded that teens respond best to "up-front and powerful messages that display courage and honesty in a forceful way."

Other advertisements with various themes were produced between 2000 and 2014, including "Connect truth", "The Sunny Side of truth", "Unsweetened truth", and "Ugly truth."

Prior to the launch of the Food and Drug Administration's "Real Cost" campaign in February 2014, Truth was the only national youth tobacco prevention campaign not directly sponsored by the tobacco industry (although the funding from the Truth campaign also came from the tobacco industry via the Master Settlement Agreement).

=== Campaign re-launch strategy and examples ===
In August 2014, truth launched the "Finish It" campaign targeting the next generation of U.S. youth aged 15 to 21. Along with a revamped campaign design, web presence, and series of ads, the Finish It campaign challenges the current youth cohort to be the generation that ends the practice of smoking. In research with its target audience, campaign designers concluded that teenagers had become less interested in protesting against tobacco industry manipulation, and more interested in driving positive collective action. "Finish It" was developed to make use of their desire to be agents of social change. The goal of the campaign is to convince 94 percent of teenage nonsmokers, and 6 percent of teen smokers, to take an active role in ending tobacco use.

The first campaign ad released, "Finishers", was shot in the style of a video manifesto and tells the youth, "We have the power. We have the creativity. We will be the generation that ends smoking. Finish it." The spot encouraged youth to get involved in the "Finish It" movement by superimposing the campaign logo, an "X" in an orange square, onto their Facebook profile picture. This online activism tactic is similar to that used by the Human Rights Campaign when they asked individuals to change their profile pictures in support of marriage equality.

In another series of "Finish It" ads, "Unpaid Tobacco Spokesperson" and "Unpaid Tobacco Spokesperson Response", the campaign tries to shed light on the way smokers, especially celebrity smokers, give tobacco companies free marketing as "unpaid spokespeople" when their photos are posted. As a response, Finish It told youth to "think before you post a smoking selfie." The campaign also encouraged youth to "erase and replace" cigarettes from photos on social media with various props from the Truth campaign website.

In 2015, "Left Swipe Dat", a lengthy song and music video created as part of the "Finish It" campaign, debuted at the 57th Annual Grammy Awards and connected smoking to dating. The video featured Becky G, Fifth Harmony, King Bach and other famous people. The lyrics said that people whose profile picture on dating apps show smoking get half as many matches on dating apps as those who don't. "Left Swipe Dat" encouraged teens to avoid smoking so they could avoid being "left swiped", that is, passed over, on a dating app.

In another effort to connect smoking to a teen passion point, "CATmageddon" told teens that smoking is bad for pets and set up the scenario that if there were no cats (due to smoking-related illness and disease) there would be no cat videos and therefore there would be a "CATmageddon", a "world devoid of furry kittens and the adorable, hilarious videos that come with them." The ad launched at the 58th Annual Grammy Awards and featured partnerships with Petco, Adult Swim, and BuzzFeed.

In 2017, the Truth campaign focused on how the tobacco industry has targeted African-Americans, low-income communities, LGBTQ individuals, members of the military, and those with mental health conditions. The campaign highlighted the connection between the tobacco industry's advertising tactics and the tobacco-related health disparities across these demographics. Initial documentary-style videos created for this campaign featured comedian and actress Amanda Seales and premiered at the 59th Annual Grammy Awards. Later videos, premiered at the 2017 MTV Video Music Awards and featured journalists Kaj Larsen and Ryan Duffy, as well as rapper Logic.

In 2018, anti-vaping campaign ads became part of the campaign.

=== Grassroots tours ===
In addition to its television advertisements, the campaign maintains an online presence and employs guerrilla "on-the-street" marketing. Grassroots marketing is done via a team of "truth tour riders" who are sent to popular music and sporting events across the country every summer, including the Warped Tour, Mayhem Festival and High School Nation.

=== Merchandise ===
A line of custom merchandise for the campaign is produced and distributed at summer events. Each piece of merchandise features a design that highlights a fact about smoking. Items are often created in partnership with artists, such as a pair of custom sneakers made in collaboration with Kevin Lyons and Vans shoes. That partnership also included promotion of a contest called "Custom Culture" where students competed in design challenges relevant to the campaign's merchandise and subject matter.

== Evaluation and effectiveness ==
Truth Initiative employs an internal research and evaluation team, and evaluation studies of the Truth campaign have been published in peer-reviewed literature since the launch of the campaign in 2000. The studies have included evaluation of televised ads as well as digital, gaming and "grassroots" campaign components. Between 1999 and 2004, Truth Initiative (known at the time as the American Legacy Foundation) conducted a nationally representative Media Tracking Survey of youth aged 12–17 to inform its Truth campaign evaluation. The Legacy Media Tracking Survey (LMTS) measured tobacco-related attitudes, beliefs, and behaviors, exposure to smoking influences including Truth, sensation seeking, and openness to smoking.

Cross-sectional studies on the effectiveness of the Truth campaign provided evidence that the campaign "had a significant impact on tobacco industry-related attitudes, beliefs, and other behavioral precursors, as well as a significant impact on youth smoking prevalence in the United States." Exposure to Truth advertisements was also associated with a statistically significant reduction in nonsmokers' intentions to smoke in the future. Another study of the Truth program from 2000 to 2004 examined whether campaign awareness and receptivity differed for youth across socioeconomic backgrounds. In 2005, a study published in the American Journal of Public Health conducted by RTI International, Columbia University, and Truth Initiative used a pre/post quasi-experimental design to relate changes in national youth smoking prevalence to exposure to the Truth campaign over time. The study's statistical analyses showed that smoking rates among youth in the U.S. declined at a faster rate after the launch of the Truth campaign. A similar study published in the American Journal of Preventive Medicine in 2009 found a direct association between youth exposure to Truth messaging and a decreased risk of taking up smoking.

A 2009 study examined whether the $324 million investment in the Truth campaign could be justified by its effect on public health outcomes. Researchers asserted that the campaign was economically efficient because it saved between $1.9 and $5.4 billion in medical care costs to society between 2000 and 2002. In this way, the authors argued that the campaign is a cost-effective public health intervention.

A study evaluating the "Finish It" campaign indicated lower intentions to smoke in the next year as well as anti-tobacco attitudes with higher ad awareness. Ad recall remained high, even when the campaign aired lower levels of television targeted rating points as compared with earlier Truth advertising campaigns.

== Awards and praise ==
The Truth campaign has been praised by some federal and state public health officials, as well as the U.S. Centers for Disease Control and Prevention, and the U.S. Department of Health and Human Services. The campaign has also been recognized for its achievements in marketing with numerous awards in advertising efficacy, such as Emmy, Clio Healthcare, and Effie awards. The Truth campaign has also been featured in some academic marketing and communications textbooks.

In 2014, Advertising Age named Truth one of the top 10 ad campaigns on the 21st century.

In 2016, the Monitoring the Future study, which surveys national samples of over 45,000 youth in grades 8, 10 and 12, reported historically low levels of current cigarette use amongst youth – only 6 percent of teens still smoke. This may be more attributable to the rising prevalence of vaping than the success of the campaign.

== Litigation ==
A Truth campaign radio ad called "Dog Walker" prompted Lorillard Tobacco Company to threaten litigation against Truth Initiative (then the American Legacy Foundation). Under the threat of litigation from Lorillard, the foundation pre-emptively sued Lorillard in Delaware, and Lorillard followed by suing the foundation in North Carolina. The dispute ran from July 2001 until a court decision in July 2006. The Truth advertisement notes that cigarettes are manufactured with chemical additives, and emphasizes the idea that urine and cigarettes both contain urea (an odorless chemical that is basically non-toxic, although urea is best known to the general public as a component of urine). The ad features a prank phone call from an actor portraying a dog walker offering to sell dog urine to Lorillard as a source of urea for use in manufacturing their cigarettes. Lorillard alleged that the ad was misleading and violated a provision in the Master Settlement Agreement that prohibits parties from engaging in "vilification" and "personal attacks".

A judge in the case noted that the foundation was "in the position of targeting ads against the very companies that are funding its existence", and said "Moreover, the risk of litigation could be directly related to the effectiveness of the ads. Therefore, in order to succeed in fulfilling its mandate, ALF needed to put itself at risk of litigation."

The matter was decided by the Delaware Supreme Court on July 17, 2006, which ruled unanimously that the campaign did not violate the Master Settlement Agreement.

== See also ==
- Truth Initiative
- Tobacco Master Settlement Agreement
- Tobacco control
- Project SCUM
