= Tobacco bond =

In finance, a tobacco bond is a type of US bond issued by a state to obtain immediate cash backed up with a won lawsuit against a tobacco company. The typical tobacco bond lasts 30 years or less and pays interest every year.

By 2014, tobacco bonds made up $94 billion of the $3.7 trillion municipal bond market. They share a revenue stream from the Tobacco Master Settlement Agreement, a 1998 national settlement in which Philip Morris, Lorillard and Reynolds American agreed to make annual payments to states in perpetuity to resolve liabilities for health-care costs related to smoking. Some states — Alaska, California, Iowa, Michigan, New Jersey, New York, Ohio, Rhode Island, West Virginia, as well as Washington, D.C., Puerto Rico and Guam — borrowed against the funds, which are based on cigarette shipments.

== Issued ==
=== California ===
The state of California issued $3.1 billion in tobacco bonds in 2005.

=== Rhode Island ===
The state of Rhode Island issued $618 million in tobacco bonds in March 2015.

== See also ==
- Tobacco Master Settlement Agreement
