= Truth Initiative =

Nonprofit tobacco control organization

- Formation: 1999; 27 years ago
- Type: Nonprofit organization
- Purpose: Tobacco control, community outreach, research, smoking cessation, public health
- Headquarters: Washington, D.C., U.S.
- Location: United States
- Key people: Kathy Crosby, CEO and president Mike Moore, chair, board of directors
- Staff: 133 (2017)
- Website: truthinitiative.org
- Formerly called: American Legacy Foundation (1999–2015)

Truth Initiative (formerly the American Legacy Foundation or Legacy) is a nonprofit tobacco control organization "dedicated to achieving a culture where all youth and young adults reject tobacco". It was established in March 1999 as a result of the Tobacco Master Settlement Agreement between the attorneys general of 46 states, the District of Columbia and five United States territories, and the tobacco industry. Truth Initiative is best known for its youth smoking prevention campaign. Its other primary aims include conducting tobacco control research and policy studies, organizing community and youth engagement programs and developing digital cessation and prevention products, including through revenue-generating models. The organization changed its name from the American Legacy Foundation to Truth Initiative on September 8, 2015, to align its name with that of its Truth campaign. As of 2016, the organization had more than $957 million in assets and a staff of 133 based primarily in its Washington, D.C., office.

== History ==
Truth Initiative was founded in 1999 as a result of the Tobacco Master Settlement Agreement (MSA). The MSA was announced in 1998, resolving the lawsuits brought by 46 U.S. states, the District of Columbia and five territories against the major U.S. cigarette companies, to recover state Medicaid and other costs from caring for sick smokers. The four other states settled separately. The tobacco industry agreed to pay the states billions of dollars in perpetuity, making the MSA the then-largest civil litigation settlement in U.S. history. The states directed that a portion of the money they received from the settlement should be used to establish a national public health foundation dedicated to prevent youth smoking and helping smokers quit: the American Legacy Foundation, now Truth Initiative.

In 2018, the Truth Initiative partnered with Office of National Drug Control Policy and the Ad Council to combat opioid addiction.

== Activities ==
=== Truth Campaign ===
Truth Initiative's signature program is its Truth campaign, a youth smoking prevention mass media public education program that has been widely credited with contributing to a significant drop in teen smoking. In 2000, 23% of American 8th, 10th and 12th graders smoked. As of 2016, that figure was 6%. The campaign exposed tobacco industry practices as well as the health effects and social consequences of smoking.

=== Truth Initiative Schroeder Institute ===
Researchers in the Truth Initiative Schroeder Institute publish dozens of peer-reviewed research articles each year with the goal of identifying methods to minimize the harms of tobacco use, measure the effectiveness of interventions and identify best practices for tobacco control. Research is also done to assess the Truth campaign's efforts, both pre-and post-market, including the use of the longitudinal Truth Longitudinal Cohort (TLC) survey of more than 10,000 young people and a continuous tracking study to assess campaign awareness and message receptivity.

In the early 2000s the American Legacy Foundation (as the Truth Initiative was then known) gave around $10 million of the settlement funds it managed to the University of California San Francisco (UCSF) to help it formalize and expand the collection of internal tobacco industry documents that its library already hosted; the collection was then named the Legacy Tobacco Documents Library. As of May 2017, the library contained 14.7 million internal documents (nearly 89 million pages) created by major tobacco companies related to their advertising, manufacturing, marketing, sales and scientific research activities.

=== Community and Youth Engagement ===
Truth Initiative provides individuals, coalitions, and organizations information and methods to reduce tobacco use in their communities. The organization trains and educates young people interested in tobacco control and partners with community-serving organizations to reduce tobacco use. This includes a grant program for community colleges and historically black colleges and universities to create tobacco-free campuses.

Examples of youth activism programs include:

- National Summit on Youth Activism: A training program for high school students that provides activism strategies, media training and approaches to community engagement
- Youth Activism Fellowship: A year-long training program for young adults that prepares participants to carry out a tobacco control project in his or her community

These community engagement programs are often an "on the ground" extension of the Truth campaign's work. Supporters of the campaign are called upon to support other anti-tobacco issues, such as a 2017 rally outside a Walgreens shareholders meeting in New York that was organized to pressure the pharmacy's board of directors to stop selling tobacco in its stores.

=== Innovations, 2008-2017 ===
The innovations center within Truth Initiative designs, builds and markets digital smoking cessation and prevention products that are centered around online social networks, text messaging and web and mobile applications. Any revenue generated by the innovations programs helps support other work at the organization.

Examples of these programs include:

- BecomeAnEX: Created in 2008, BecomeAnEX is a free online resource for individuals who want to quit smoking. Its website hosts a community forum and features blogs written by other smokers and ex-smokers that discuss quit strategies, challenges and successes. In addition to the online community, the site offers cessation tools, counseling, medication information and other cessation support services.
- EX Program: Launched in 2017 in collaboration with Mayo Clinic, the EX Program is a digital quit smoking program based on BecomeAnEx that health systems, health plans and employers can purchase and offer to their employees and members. In April 2025, EX Program announced its exclusive partnership with Blip, an emerging FDA-approved nicotine replacement therapy (NRT) brand targeting young adults.
- This Is Quitting: Designed for young adults, This Is Quitting is a mobile app that relays evidence-based text messages and other user-generated content to assist users in the process of quitting smoking.

== Leadership ==
=== Staff ===
As of 2018, Truth Initiative was led by a senior leadership team with representatives from each of its functional program areas. Headed by CEO and President Kathy Crosby, this team included:

- Barbara Schillo, chief research officer, Truth Initiative Schroeder Institute
- Liz Kenny, chief marketing officer
- Amanda L. Graham, chief of innovations
- Tricia Kenney, chief communications officer
- Anthony O'Toole, chief financial and investment officer
- Anna M. Spriggs, chief of human resources and administration
- Amy Taylor, chief of community engagement
- Robert Falk, general counsel

=== Board of directors, 2017 ===
Name	Position	Role	Location
Kathy Crosby	CEO and president	Director ex officio Truth Initiative	Washington, D.C.
Mike Moore	Chair	Principal, Mike Moor Law Firm, LLC	Flowood, MS
Doug Peterson	Treasurer	Nebraska Attorney General	Lincoln, NE
Georges C. Benjamin, MD	Director	Executive Director, American Public Health Association	Washington, D.C.
Nancy Brown	Vice Chair	CEO, American Heart Association	Dallas, TX
Herb Conaway, MD	Director	Member, New Jersey General Assembly	Delran, NJ
Mike DeWine	Director	Governor of Ohio	Columbus, OH
James (Jim) Dunnigan	Director	Representative, Utah State Legislature	Salt Lake City, UT
Mary T. Bassett, MD, MPH	Director	Commissioner, New York City Department of Health and Mental Hygiene	New York City, NY
Steve Oyer	Director	President, i[x] Investments	New York City, NY
Josh Stein	Director	Attorney General of North Carolina	Raleigh, NC
Gina Raimondo	Director	Secretary of Commerce	Providence, RI
Giana Darville	Youth Board Liaison	Oakwood University Alum	Memphis, TN
J'Pierre Bolling	Youth Board Liaison	Georgia State University	Brooklyn, NY

== Awards and recognition ==
In addition to awards for its Truth campaign, including being named among the top 10 ad campaigns of the 21st century, Truth Initiative has also been recognized with the following:

- 2005 Latino Marketing Awards - Public Relations Public Education Program
- 2010 Communicator Awards Award of Excellence - Integrated Campaign
- 2012 Hermes Creative Awards Platinum Award - Publications/Annual Report and PR Campaign
- 2012 PR Daily Awards Best Annual Report (Print) honorable mention
- 2012 Nonprofit PR Awards Annual Publication or Brochure honorable mention
- 2012 PRWeek Awards In-House PR Team of the Year honorable mention
- 2013 Telly Awards Online Video Silver Telly and Bronze Telly
- 2016 North American Effie Index top five most effective marketer
- 2017 Inc. magazine top 10 Washington, D.C. companies with the coolest perks
- 2017 honoree, Center for Positive Organizations' Positive Business Project
- 2017 Alliance for Workplace Excellence Health & Wellness Seal of Approval

== See also ==
- Truth (anti-tobacco campaign)
