= Tony Garrett =

British business executive, chairman of Imperial Tobacco (1918-2017)

Richard Anthony Garrett CBE (4 July 1918 – 24 October 2017) was a British business executive, chairman of Imperial Tobacco (1973–1979).

He was born near Cardiff, grew up near Bristol, and educated at the King's School, Worcester.

He joined Imperial Tobacco in 1936, initially working as a junior at the Wills plant (W.D. & H.O. Wills being a subsidiary of Imperial Tobacco) in Bristol.

Already a territorial soldier, Garrett was called up at the start of World War II, and commissioned into the 2nd Royal Gloucestershire Hussars in January 1941. As a captain with the 22nd Dragoons, he participated in the Normandy landings, landing on D+2 and fighting across the Low Countries into Germany with his tank squadron.

He was chairman of John Player & Sons (also a subsidiary of Imperial Tobacco) from 1968, and chairman of Imperial Tobacco from 1973 to 1979.

Cigarette advertising on television had been banned in the UK in 1965. Himself a keen sportsman, Garrett instead promoted tobacco products through sports sponsorship deals, attaching the John Player brand name to the John Player League in cricket and to rugby league and golf tournaments, and sponsoring the Lotus F1 racing team. Garrett also led Imperial Tobacco to sponsor classical music extensively, and collaborated in the founding of the Association for Business Sponsorship of the Arts (later Arts & Business).

In June 1977, Garrett invited executives of the world's leading tobacco companies to a secret meeting at Shockerwick House to formulate a defensive strategy against anti-smoking health campaigns, a programme known as Operation Berkshire.

He was later chairman of the diary publisher Dataday, the Bath International Music Festival, and the National Association of Boys' Clubs (1980–1987). He was a trustee of the Royal Opera House and Glyndebourne.

He was appointed CBE in 1987.
