= Poladtuğay =

- Municipality
- Location within Azerbaijan
- Coordinates: 39°50′36″N 48°54′00″E
- Country: Azerbaijan
- Rayon: Sabirabad

Population
  - Total: 1,201
- Time zone: UTC+4 (AZT)
  - Summer (DST): UTC+5 (AZT)

Poladtuğay (also, Polat-Tagay and Polat-Tugay) is a village and municipality in the Sabirabad Rayon of Azerbaijan. It has a population of 1,201.
