= Harold Charles Bold =

American botanist (1909–1987)

Harold Charles Bold (1909–1987) was an American botanist.

== Early life ==
Bold was born on June 16, 1909, in New York City to Edward Bold and Louise (Krüsi) Bold. He earned his Bachelor of Arts from Columbia University in 1929, Phi Beta Kappa., his Master of Science from the University of Vermont in 1931, and his Ph.D. in botany in 1933 at Columbia. He married Mary E. Douthit on June 8, 1943.

He worked at the University of Vanderbilt from 1932 to 1939 and again from 1945 to 1957. From 1939 to 1945 he was at Columbia. After 1957 he taught botany at the University of Texas at Austin. He was the director of the Botanical Society of America in 1955 and the director of The American Journal of Botany from 1958 to 1965. His work focused on sub-aerial and soil algae.

== Publications ==
- Morphology of Plants (1957)
- The Plant Kingdom (1960)
- Exploratory studies of texas soil algae (with Temd R. Deadson) (1960)
- Some algae from arid soils (with Srisumon Chantanachat) (1962)
- The taxonomy of certain Ulotrichacean algae (with KR Mattox) (1962)
- Some soil algae from enchanted rock and related algae species (with Harry W. Bischoff) (1963)
- Comparative studies of the algal genera Tetracystis and Chlorococcum (with Malcolm R. Brown & Richard N. Lester) (1964)
- Investigations of the algal genera Eremosphaera and Oocystis (with Richard L. Smith) (1966)
- Taxonomic investigations of Stigeoclonium (with Elenor R. Cox) (1966)
- Algae and Fungi (1967)
- The taxonomy and comparative physiology of the Chlorosarcinales and certain other edaphic algae (with Robert D. Groover) (1969)
- Morphological and taxonomic investigations of Nostoc and Anabaena in culture (with Thomas Kantz) (1969)
- Taxonomic studies in the Oscillatoriaceae (with Ailsie F. Baker) (1970)
- The genus Chlorococcum Meneghini (with Patricia A. Archibald) (1970)
- Characium and some characium-like algae (with Kwok W. Lee) (1974)
- Introduction to the Algae: Structure and Reproduction (1978)
