= Emily Bold =

German author

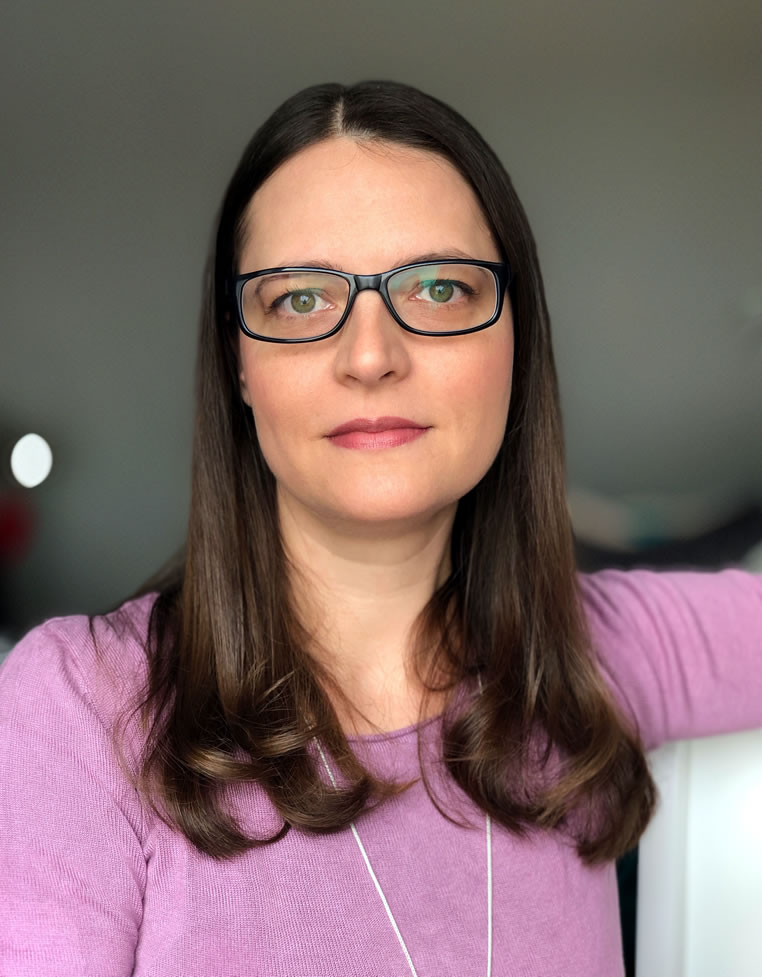
Emily Bold

Emily Bold (born 2 March 1980) is a German writer who lives in Bavaria. She writes romantic historical novels and stories for young adults, some of which have been translated into English. She became a best selling author in 2011 with Gefährliche Intrigen (Dangerous Intrigue).

Bold has been writing novels since 2008. In May 2011, she published her first novel, Gefährliche Intrigen, on Kindle. As a result, it soon became a best seller. Her other works are also available as eBooks as well as paperbacks. When publishing on Kindle, she handles all the formatting and cover design herself. She also makes use of Facebook and other social media sites to promote the marketing of her works.

== Works ==
=== English translations ===
- The Curse: Touch of Eternity (The Curse Series), Skyscape, 2013
- The Curse: Breath of Yesterday (The Curse Series Book 2), Skyscape, 2014
- Midnight Kisses (Midnight Series Book 1), Amazon Digital Services
- Midnight Tears (Midnight Series Book 2), Amazon Digital Services
- Midnight Dreams (Midnight Series Book 3), Amazon Digital Services

=== Windham Series ===
1. Vergessene Küsse. 2012, ISBN 978-1-4811-5442-0.
2. Verborgene Tränen. 2013, ISBN 978-1-4823-8986-9.
3. Verlorene Träume. 2013, ISBN 978-1-4848-4780-0.

=== The Curse ===
1. Vanoras Fluch. 2012, ISBN 978-1-4776-7860-2.
2. Im Schatten der Schwestern. 2012, ISBN 978-1-4792-9746-7.
3. Das Vermächtnis. 2013, ISBN 978-1-4923-7673-6.

=== The Darkest Red ===
1. Aus Nebel geboren. 2013, ISBN 978-1-4947-1034-7.
2. Von Flammen verzehrt. 2014, ISBN 978-1-4953-8785-2.
3. Im Dunkel verborgen. 2014, ISBN 978-3-8450-1479-1.

=== Other works ===
- Blacksoul – In den Armen des Piraten. 2012, ISBN 978-1-4775-8352-4.
- Gefährliche Intrigen. 2012, ISBN 978-1-4775-8864-2.
- Mitternachtsfalke – Auf den Schwingen der Liebe. 2012, ISBN 978-1-4775-9369-1.
- Zwei Seelen. 2012.
- Klang der Gezeiten. 2014, ISBN 978-1-4778-2458-0.
