= Boldi =

Boldi is an Italian surname. Notable people with the surname include:

- Benito Boldi (1934–2021), Italian footballer
- Massimo Boldi (born 1945), Italian stand-up comedian and actor
