= List of people known as the Bold =

The Bold is an epithet which may refer to:

== People ==
- Albert III, Duke of Saxony (1443–1500)
- Bolesław II the Bold (c. 1041 or 1042–1081 or 1082), King and Duke of Poland
- Brendan the Navigator (c. 484–c. 577), Irish monastic saint
- Charles the Bold (1433-1477), Duke of Burgundy
- Mstislav Mstislavich (died 1228), prince of Kievan Rus
- Philip III of France, le Hardi (the Bold) (1245-1285), King of France
- Philip the Bold (1342-1404), Duke of Burgundy
- Uhtred of Bamburgh (died 1016), ealdorman of Northumbria
- Ulfcytel (died 1016), East Anglian military leader
- Vladimir the Bold (1353-1410), a prince of Serpukhov (in present-day Russia)

== Legendary figures ==
- Vadim the Bold, a chieftain of the Ilmen Slavs

== See also ==
- Bold (disambiguation)
