= Bold (detergent) =

American laundry detergent brand

Bold is a laundry detergent brand owned by Procter & Gamble.

== History ==
Bold was originally introduced in the United States in 1965, and was launched in 1974 as the UK's first low suds biological detergent. In 1982, it was relaunched as the country's only combined detergent and conditioner, and has been a popular product since.

In 2004, the Bold 2-in-1 detergent and conditioner product packaging was updated.
