= MitID =

Login solution in Denmark

MitID is the state-run digital identification system for online platforms in Denmark. It is used to prove a person's identity when logging in to websites, especially those of the public administration, and at the end of 2021 it replaced the NemID system, which had established itself as the national eID solution.

It was developed by the company Nets in cooperation with the Ministry of Digital Affairs and the Danish banks, and it is used by all public and private-sector services, such as insurance companies.

Together with the personal identification number, NemID and MitID significantly advanced digitalization in many areas, making many administrative visits unnecessary and even greatly reducing postal correspondence.

== History ==
As early as 1999, the Danish government initiated a study on digital signatures, which formed the basis for NemID, introduced in 2010 and subsequently established as the national solution for digital identification. NemID was based on the iTAN method.

Because the system was state-funded and not subject to market competition, and because the eIDAS Regulation required higher security standards, the NemID contract was terminated and the development of MitID was initiated. The rollout of MitID began in October 2021, marking the transition phase from NemID to MitID. From 22 September 2022, all citizens were required to use MitID to access public administration platforms, including the tax system (skat.dk), citizen services portals (borger.dk and LifeInDenmark.dk), and the healthcare system (sundhed.dk).
