= Wrest =

Scottish folk rock band

- Wrest playing at The Thekla, Bristol in April 2024

Background information
- Origin: Dumfries and Falkirk, Scotland
- Genres: Folk rock, Indie rock, indie folk
- Years active: 2017–present
- Members: Stewart Douglas; Stephen Whipp; Craig Robertson; Jonny Tait
- Website: wrest.band

Wrest are a Scottish folk rock band, formed in 2017. Singer and guitarist Stewart Douglas hails from Falkirk, whilst the remaining members are from Dumfries; the band is now based in Edinburgh. The band is unsigned and release their own music; they set up their own promotions company to book shows which now manages bookings for many other acts in the UK. They have released three full-length albums and a number of EPs and singles.

== History ==
Wrest released their first single "Adventurers", in 2017. Two further singles, "Hope Springs" and "Human" followed, the latter being placed by Spotify on playlists which widened the band's reach, prior to the release of debut album Coward of us All in 2019. Despite a number of fine reviews, including being named "Scotland's best new band" by the Border Telegraph the band's plans were interrupted by the COVID-19 pandemic, which cancelled nearly all their shows for 18 months.

The band used the time to record a second album, End All The Days. and toured it across the UK and Europe for the next two years, including sold-out shows in the UK - such as Edinburgh's 900-capacity Queen's Hall and Glasgow Garage - as well as places such as Berlin, Hamburg and Dusseldorf.

In 2024 the band released their third album, Everything's Nothing Forever Again, and culminated a tour by selling out Glasgow's 1,900-capacity Barrowland Ballroom. Douglas commented that "Opportunities like headlining Barrowlands simply would not be available to us if we were relying on promoters and industry backing." In 2025, the band played their biggest show to date, at the 2,200 capacity Usher Hall in Edinburgh.

== Discography ==
All music is self-released.

=== Albums ===
- Coward of Us All (2019)
- End All The Days (2022)
- Everything's Nothing Forever Again (2024)

=== EPs ===
- A World That Has Left You Unspoken (2020)
- Bedtime Rhymes (2023)

=== Singles ===
- "Adventurers" (2017)
- "Hope Springs" (2018)
- "Human" (2019)
- "A Perfectly Spherical World" (2020)
- "Blood" (2020)
- "Second Wind" (2021)
- "Medicine" (2021)
- "Bold" (2021)

== Members ==
- Stewart Douglas - vocals, guitar
- Stephen Whipp - guitar
- Craig Robertson - bass guitar
- Jonny Tait - drums
