= Tobacco Master Settlement Agreement =

1998 US lawsuit settlement

The Tobacco Master Settlement Agreement (MSA), entered on November 23, 1998, was between the four largest U.S. tobacco companies—Philip Morris, R. J. Reynolds, Brown & Williamson and Lorillard (the "original participating manufacturers" or "Majors")—and the attorneys general of 46 states. It resolved state Medicaid lawsuits seeking recovery of tobacco-related health-care costs. In exchange, the companies agreed to limit certain marketing practices and to pay the states indefinitely for some medical expenses related to smoking, committing at least $206 billion over the first 25 years. The MSA also created the anti-smoking advocacy group, the Truth Initiative, which maintains a public document archive, and led to the dissolution of the Tobacco Institute, the Center for Indoor Air Research, and the Council for Tobacco Research.

== History of adoption ==
=== Private lawsuits before the settlement ===
In September 1950, an article was published in the British Medical Journal linking smoking to lung cancer and heart disease. In 1954 the British Doctors Study confirmed the suggestion, based on which the government issued advice that smoking and lung cancer rates were related. In 1964 the United States Surgeon General's Report on Smoking and Health likewise began suggesting the relationship between smoking and cancer.

By the mid-1950s, individuals in the United States began to sue the companies responsible for manufacturing and marketing cigarettes for damages related to the effects of smoking. In the forty years through 1994, over 800 private claims were brought against tobacco companies in state courts across the country. The individuals asserted claims for negligent manufacture, negligent advertising, fraud, and violation of various state consumer protection statutes. The tobacco companies were successful against these lawsuits. Only two plaintiffs ever prevailed, and both of those decisions were reversed on appeal. As scientific evidence mounted in the 1980s, tobacco companies claimed contributory negligence as they asserted adverse health effects were previously unknown or lacked substantial credibility.

=== State litigation ===
In the mid-1990s, more than 40 states commenced litigation against the tobacco industry, seeking monetary, equitable, and injunctive relief under various consumer-protection and antitrust laws. The first case was declared in May 1994 by Mississippi Attorney General Mike Moore.

The general theory of these lawsuits was that the cigarettes produced by the tobacco industry contributed to health problems among the population, which in turn resulted in significant costs to the states' public health systems. As Moore declared, "[The] lawsuit is premised on a simple notion: you caused the health crisis; you pay for it." The states alleged a wide range of deceptive and fraudulent practices by the tobacco companies over decades of sales. Other states soon followed. The state lawsuits sought recovery for Medicaid and other public health expenses incurred in the treatment of smoking-induced illnesses. Importantly, the defenses of personal responsibility that were so effective for the tobacco industry in suits by private individuals were inapplicable to the causes of action alleged by the states.

=== Proposed "Global Settlement Agreement" ===
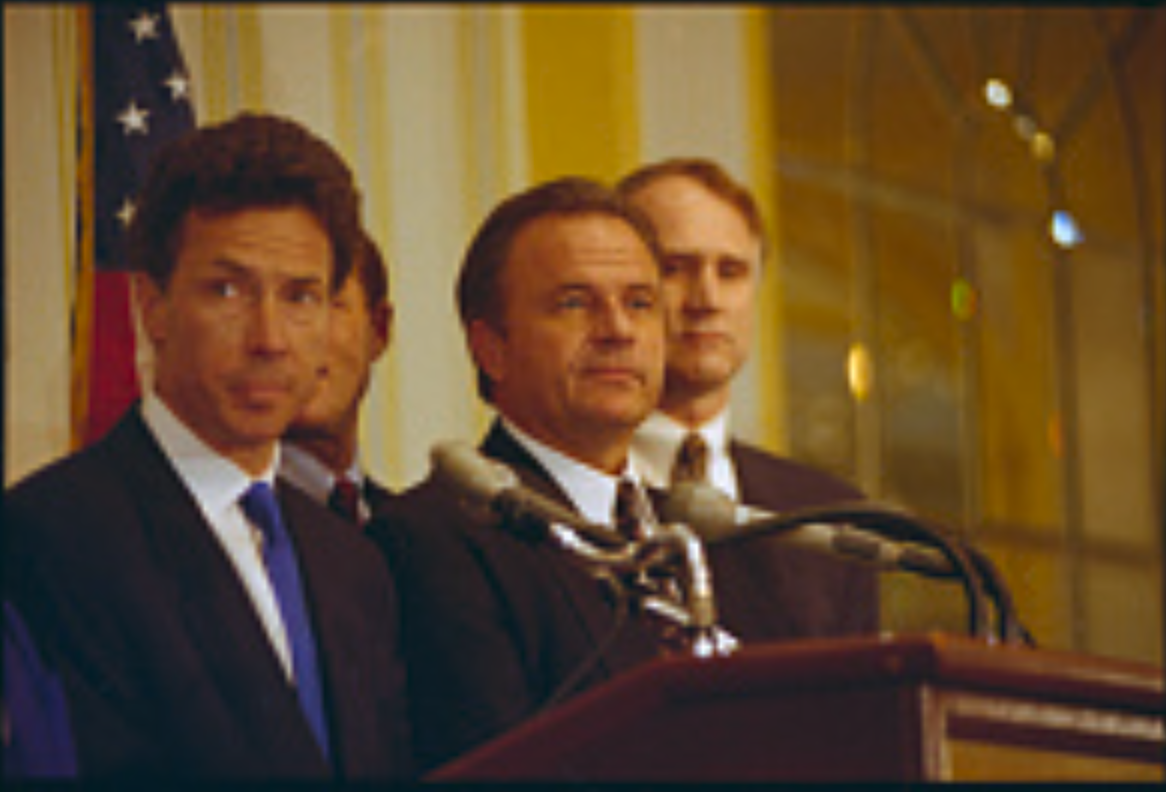
Mike Moore (left) announcing the tobacco settlement agreement

Faced with the prospect of defending multiple actions nationwide, the Majors sought a congressional remedy, primarily in the form of a national legislative settlement. In June 1997, the National Association of Attorneys General and the Majors jointly petitioned Congress for a global resolution. On June 20, 1997, Mississippi Attorney General Michael Moore and a group of other attorneys general announced the details of the settlement. The settlement included a payment by the companies of $365.5 billion, agreement to possible Food and Drug Administration regulation under certain circumstances, and stronger warning labels and restrictions on advertising. In exchange the companies would be freed from class-action suits and litigation costs would be capped.

This proposed congressional remedy (1997 National Settlement Proposal (NSP), a.k.a. the "June 20, 1997 Proposal") for the cigarette tobacco problem resembled the eventual Multistate Settlement Agreement (MSA), but with important differences. For example, although the congressional proposal would have earmarked one-third of all funds to combat teenage smoking, no such restrictions appear in the MSA. In addition, the congressional proposal would have mandated Food and Drug Administration oversight and imposed federal advertising restrictions. It also would have granted immunity from state prosecutions; eliminated punitive damages in individual tort suits; and prohibited the use of class actions, or other joinder or aggregation devices without the defendant's consent, assuring that only individual actions could be brought. The congressional proposal called for payments to the states of $368.5 billion over 25 years. By contrast, assuming that the Majors would maintain their market share, the MSA provides baseline payments of about $200 billion over 25 years. This baseline payment is subject to

the Inflation Adjustment, the Volume Adjustment, the Previously Settled States Reduction, the Non-Settling States Reduction, the NPM Adjustment, the offset for miscalculated or disputed payments described in subsection XI(i), the Federal Tobacco Legislation Offset, the Litigating Releasing Parties Offset, and the offsets for claims over described in subsections XII(a)(4)(B) and XII(a)(8).

— MSA § IX(c).

The attorneys general did not have the authority to grant all this by themselves: the Global Settlement Agreement would require an act of Congress. Senator John McCain of Arizona carried the bill, which was much more aggressive than even the global settlement. However, in the spring of 1998, Congress rejected both the proposed settlement and an alternative proposal submitted by McCain.

While the proposed legislation was being discussed in Congress, some individual states began settling their litigation against the tobacco industry. On July 2, 1997, Mississippi became the first. Over the next year, Florida, Texas, and Minnesota followed, with the four states recovering a total of over $35 billion.

=== Adoption of the "Master Settlement Agreement" ===
On November 23, 1998, the Attorneys General of the remaining 46 states, as well as of the District of Columbia, Puerto Rico, and the Virgin Islands, entered into the Master Settlement Agreement with the four largest manufacturers of cigarettes in the United States. (Florida, Minnesota, Texas and Mississippi had already reached individual agreements with the tobacco industry.) The four manufacturers—Philip Morris USA, R. J. Reynolds Tobacco Company, Brown & Williamson Tobacco Corp., and Lorillard Tobacco Company—are referred to in the MSA as the Original Participating Manufacturers (OPMs).

This settlement process yielded two other national agreements:

==== Smokeless Tobacco Master Settlement Agreement ====
In the Smokeless Tobacco Master Settlement Agreement, which was executed at the same time as the Master Settlement Agreement, the leading manufacturer in the smokeless tobacco market (United States Tobacco Company, now known as U.S. Smokeless Tobacco Company) settled with the jurisdictions who signed the MSA, plus Minnesota and Mississippi.

==== Phase II settlement ====
The next year, the major cigarette manufacturers settled with the tobacco-growing states to compensate tobacco growers for losses they were expected to suffer due to the higher cigarette prices resulting from the earlier settlements. Called the "Phase II" settlement, this agreement created the National Tobacco Growers' Settlement Trust Fund. Tobacco growers and quota holders in the 14 states that grow flue-cured and burley tobacco used to manufacture cigarettes are eligible to receive payments from the trust fund. The states are Alabama, Florida, Georgia, Indiana, Kentucky, Maryland, Missouri, North Carolina, Ohio, Pennsylvania, South Carolina, Tennessee, Virginia, and West Virginia.

==== Subsequent signatories ====
At the time the Master Settlement Agreement became effective, the OPMs collectively controlled approximately 97% of the domestic market for cigarettes. In addition to these "originally settling parties" (OSPs), the Master Settlement Agreement permits other tobacco companies to join the settlement; a list of these "subsequently settling parties" (SSPs) is maintained by the National Association of Attorneys General. Since 1998, approximately 41 additional tobacco companies have joined the Master Settlement Agreement. These companies, referred to as the Subsequent Participating Manufacturers (SPMs), are bound by the Master Settlement Agreement's restrictions and must make payments to the settling states as set forth in the Master Settlement Agreement. Collectively, the OPMs and the SPMs are referred to as the Participating Manufacturers (PMs). Any tobacco company choosing not to participate in the Master Settlement Agreement is referred to as a Nonparticipating Manufacturer (NPM).

As an incentive to join the Master Settlement Agreement, the agreement provides that, if an SPM joined within ninety days following the Master Settlement Agreement's "Execution Date," that SPM is exempt ("exempt SPM") from making annual payments to the settling states unless the SPM increases its share of the national cigarette market beyond its 1998 market share, or beyond 125% of that SPM's 1997 market share. If the exempt SPM's market share in a given year increases beyond those relevant historic limits, the MSA requires that the exempt SPM make annual payments to the settling states, similar to those made by the OPMs, but based only upon the SPM's sales representing the exempt SPM's market share increase.

SPMs joining the Master Settlement Agreement after this ninety-day exempt period must, instead, make annual payments based upon all of the SPM's national cigarette sales for a given year. In addition to its annual payment obligations, in order [**9] to join the Master Settlement Agreement now, a non-exempt SPM must, "within a reasonable time after signing the" Master Settlement Agreement, pay the amount it would have been obligated to pay under the Master Settlement Agreement during the time between the Master Settlement Agreement's effective date and the date on which the SPM joined the agreement.

The addition of the Subsequent Participating Manufacturers meant that nearly all of the cigarette producers in the domestic market had signed the Multistate Settlement Agreement. Their addition was significant. The Majors allegedly feared that any cigarette manufacturer left out of a settlement (Non-Participating Manufacturers or NPMs) would be free to expand market share or could enter the market with lower prices, drastically altering the Majors' future profits and their ability to increase prices to pay for the settlement.

== Summary of terms ==
The Original Participating Manufacturers (OPMs) agreed to several broad categories of conditions:

- to restrict their advertising, sponsorship, lobbying, and litigation activities, particularly as those activities were seen as targeting youth;
- to disband three specific "Tobacco-Related Organizations," and to restrict their creation and participation in trade associations;
- generally to make available to the public documents the OPMs had disclosed during the discovery phase of their litigation with the settling states;
- to create and fund the National Public Education Foundation, dedicated to reducing youth smoking and preventing diseases associated with smoking.
- to make annual payments to the settling states in perpetuity.

A section on enforcement gave jurisdiction to individual state courts to implement and enforce the term, and established a state enforcement fund ($50 million one-time payment). The participating manufacturers also paid the states' Attorney Fees.

=== Restrictions on youth targeting ===
Generally, the participating manufacturers agreed not to "take any action, directly or indirectly, to target Youth within any Settling State in the advertising, promotion or marketing of Tobacco Products, or take any action the primary purpose of which is to initiate, maintain or increase the incidence of Youth smoking within any Settling State." (§III(a))

The restrictions specified included bans on outdoor billboards, advertising on transit vehicles, as well as restrictions on sports marketing, event sponsorships and promotional products.

=== Financial provisions ===
==== Receipts by the states ====
States were to receive over $206 billion over 25 years:

- Up-front payments – $12.742 billion.
- Annual Payments, beginning April 15, 2000 – $183.177 billion estimated through 2025. 9 billion per year from 2018 into perpetuity.
- Strategic Contribution Fund, 2008–2017 – $8.61 billion.
- National Foundation ($250 million over 10 years).
- Public Education Fund (at least $1.45 billion 2000–2003).
- State Enforcement Fund ($50 million, one-time payment).
- National Association of Attorneys General ($1.5 billion over next 10 years).

==== Payments by the Participating Manufacturers (PMs) ====
The amount of money that the PMs are required to annually contribute to the states varies according to several factors. All payments are based primarily on the number of cigarettes sold.

For the OPMs (Original Participating Manufacturers), the payments are determined in accordance with their relative market share as of 1997. The payment amount of a particular OPM is also dictated by the "Volume Adjustment," which compares the number of cigarettes sold in each payment year to the number of cigarettes sold in 1997. If the number of cigarettes sold by an OPM in a given year is less than the number it sold in 1997, the Volume Adjustment allows that OPM to reduce its payment to the settling states. In other words, a reduction in the amount of cigarettes sold by the OPMs results in the settling states receiving less money.

The MSA sets forth specific amounts that the OPMs have agreed to pay the settling states each year. Those annual amounts are subject to a number of adjustments. The OPMs each pay a portion of the total annual payment according to each OPM's "Relative Market Share" for the preceding year.

For the SPMs (Subsequent Participating Manufacturers), the payments are determined by their relative market share as compared to other SPMs. For the SPMs that joined the MSA within 90 days of its execution, the annual payments are determined by the number of cigarettes an SPM sells beyond the "grandfathered" volume—calculated as the higher of either the individual SPM's market share in 1998 (the year the MSA was executed) or 125% of the SPM's market share in 1997. If an SPM's sales volume or market share declines below the grandfathered amount, then it is not required to make any payments to the settling states. SPMs that failed to join the MSA within 90 days of its execution do not receive the benefit of any grandfathered amount.

Both exempt and non-exempt SPMs' annual payment obligations under the MSA are "calculated on the basis of the percentage of the four original participating manufacturers' total domestic market share represented by the SPM[s'] domestic market share. ... In other words, the denominator in the calculation is the total OPM market share, not the total OPM and SPM market share." Furthermore, the parties agree that the amount the SPMs pay per cigarette is roughly the same as the per-cigarette amount that the OPMs pay under the MSA. To the extent the amount differs, the OPMs pay slightly more than the SPMs on a per cigarette basis.

==== Escrow account ====
The payments from all the PMs are deposited into an escrow account until disbursement to the settling states.

The MSA includes a model escrow (or qualifying) act and provides strong incentives for settling states to adopt it. "[A] Qualifying Statute ... is one that effectively and fully neutralizes the cost disadvantages that the Participating Manufacturers experience vis-a-vis Nonparticipating Manufacturers within the state."

The MSA encouraged settling states to adopt the model escrow act by providing that a settling state's allocated payment—that is, the portion of the annual MSA payment that a particular state receives in a given year—could be reduced by applying a non-participating manufacturers ("NPM") adjustment. That adjustment lowers a state's allocated share of the annual MSA payment if the OPMs lose market share to NPMs and if "a nationally recognized firm of economic consultants" determines that the MSA was "a significant factor contributing to the Market Share Loss for the year in question." The NPM adjustment does not apply to any state that has enacted and has in "full force and effect" a "qualifying" or model escrow statute. All settling states have enacted qualifying statutes.

The escrow statute is premised on the legislative finding that, in light of the MSA settling the states' claims against the major cigarette manufacturers, [i]t would be contrary to the policy of the State if tobacco product manufacturers who determine not to enter into such a settlement could use a resulting cost advantage to derive large, short-term profits in the years before liability may arise without ensuring that the State will have an eventual source of recovery from them if they are proven to have acted culpably. It is thus in the interest of the State to require that such manufacturers establish a reserve fund to guarantee a source of compensation and to prevent such manufacturers from deriving large, short-term profits and then becoming judgment-proof before liability may arise.

In light of that, the model escrow statute requires an NPM selling cigarettes in [*1122] a given state to do one of two things: 1) join the MSA, agreeing to "become a participating manufacturer (as that term is defined in section II(jj) of the [MSA]) and generally perform its financial obligations under the [MSA]," or 2) make similar annual payments into a state "liability reserve" escrow account, the funds of which can only be used to pay a judgment or settlement on a claim against the NPM. (After 25 years, any amount remaining in the escrow account is returned to the NPM.) An NPM's annual escrow payments in a particular state are calculated by multiplying a per-cigarette amount, established by the state's legislature and set forth in the statute, by the number of cigarettes the NPM sold in that state in the year for which payment is being made. The parties agree that this per-cigarette amount is roughly equivalent to the per-cigarette amount the MSA requires from OPMs and SPMs for sales which are not exempt. To the extent it differs, the OPMs pay slightly more than the SPMs, which pay slightly more than the NPMs.

The escrow statute specifically requires that the NPM place into a qualified escrow fund by April 15 of the year following the year in question the following amounts (as such amounts are adjusted for inflation)—

- (A) 1999: $.0094241 per unit sold after the effective date of this act;
- (B) 2000: $.0104712 per unit sold;
- (C) for each of 2001 and 2002: $.0136125 per unit sold;
- (D) for each of 2003 through 2006: $.0167539 per unit sold;
- (E) for each of 2007 and each year thereafter: $.0188482 per unit sold.

==== Allocable share ====
Each state receives a payment equal to its "Allocable Share," a percentage of the funds held in escrow that has been agreed upon by the settling states and memorialized in the MSA. This "Allocable Share" (as measured by a percentage of the total funds in escrow) does not vary according to how many cigarettes are sold in a particular state in a given year.

During the drafting of the MSA, the OPMs and the settling states contemplated that many of the smaller tobacco companies would choose not to join the MSA. This failure to join posed a potential problem for both the OPMs and the settling states. The OPMs worried that the NPMs, both because they would not be bound by the advertising and other restrictions in the MSA and because they would not be required to make payments to the settling states, would be able to charge lower prices for their cigarettes and thus increase their market share.

==== NPMs ====
Although the settling states' motivation was different from that of the OPMs, these states also were concerned about the effect of the tobacco companies that refused to join the MSA. The settling states worried that the NPMs would be able to regulate their sales so as to stay afloat financially while at the same time being effectively judgment-proof. As a result of these twin concerns, the OPMs and the settling states sought to have the MSA provide these other tobacco companies with incentives to join the agreement.

One such incentive, called the NPM Adjustment, provides that the payments by the PMs to the settling states may be adjusted according to the "NPM Adjustment Percentage." According to this provision, if a nationally recognized firm of economic consultants determines that the PMs have lost market share as a result of compliance with the MSA, the PMs' required payments to the settling states will be reduced to account for the loss. The NPM Adjustment therefore gives the settling states an incentive to protect the market dominance of the PMs, because [*551] otherwise the settling states themselves will receive less funds. The MSA also provides a safe harbor from the NPM Adjustment if a settling state "diligently enforces" the provision of a Model Statute attached to the MSA and enacted by all of the settling states.

Most of the settling states have also voluntarily adopted "complementary" legislation to provide additional enforcement tools to compel compliance with the Model Statute.

==== Allocable Share Release Repeal ====
The original escrow statutes provided that NPM payments would remain in escrow for 25 years, but authorized an early release of any escrow amount which was greater than the allocable share which that state would have received if the NPM had been an SPM. The originally enacted escrow statutes permitted an NPM to obtain a refund of the amount the NPM paid into the escrow fund to the extent that a tobacco product manufacturer establishes that the amount it was required to place into escrow in a particular year was greater than the State's allocable share of the total payments that such manufacturer would have been required to make in that year under the [MSA] ... had it been a participating manufacturer. This "Allocable Share Release Provision" was intended to create substantial equivalence between the escrow obligation of NPMs under the escrow statutes and the amounts the NPMs would have paid if they had they joined the MSA.

The settling states agreed to divide the annual MSA payment among themselves according to each state's preset allocable share, rather than according to the volume of sales made in a particular state in a given year. An NPM's payments into a state's escrow fund, on the other hand, were dependent on the number of cigarettes that the NPM sold in that state in a given year. Nevertheless, the originally enacted escrow statute based any refund of those escrowed funds payments on that state's allocable share of the national MSA payment. This refund provision, then, assumed an NPM would sell its cigarettes nationally.

If an NPM made the bulk of its sales in a few states, however, it could obtain a refund of those escrow payments in excess of what it would have paid each of those States had it been an SPM. For example, an NPM which made 50 per cent of its sales in Kansas (which has a relatively low allocable share) would obtain a release from its Kansas escrow fund of more than 49 per cent of its full escrow payment. In other words, the original allocable share release provision created an unintended loophole: it only operated as intended if the NPMs distributed their products nationally. In that circumstance, the NPMs' total escrow obligations to all states with similar tobacco statutes approximately totaled the payments those NPMs would have made under the MSA. If an NPM concentrated its sales in a few state with low allocable share percentages, however, the NPM could obtain a refund of much of its escrow payments. Because the Kansas percentage was so low—roughly 0.8 per cent—NPMs concentrated their sales within Kansas and a few other states to receive immediate escrow refunds from those states.

Rather than selling cigarettes nationally, several NPMs instead concentrated their sales in just a few states. Because the originally enacted escrow statute refunded escrow funds to the extent those funds exceeded each state's "allocable share" of the national MSA payment, NPMs were able to obtain refunds of most of the monies they had paid into a state's escrow fund. To illustrate, if an NPM only sold cigarettes in Kansas in 2006, the Kansas escrow statute would require that NPM to pay into the Kansas escrow fund $.0167539 for each cigarette the NPM sold in that state. Pursuant to the refund provision in the originally enacted Kansas escrow statute, however, the NPM could obtain a refund of all but .8336712% of those payments.

One commentator further explains that the calculations under the [originally enacted escrow] statutes were based on an assumption that a nonparticipating manufacturer sold cigarettes nationally. When this was the case, the statutes functioned as intended, permitting the NPM to obtain a refund of excess amounts placed in escrow in each state. However, when an NPM followed a regional sales strategy, as several did, the original escrow statutes allowed the NPM to obtain a refund that was much larger than intended.

To close this loophole, in late 2002, the National Association of Attorneys General ("NAAG") introduced the Allocable Share Release Repealer ("ASR Repealer"), a model statute which eliminated the ASR. In a memo dated September 12, 2003, Attorney General William H. Sorrell of Vermont, Chairman of the NAAG Tobacco Project, underscored the urgency of "all States taking steps to deal with the proliferation of NPM sales, including enactment of complementary legislation and allocable share legislation and consideration of other measures designed to serve the interests of the States in avoiding reductions in tobacco settlement payments." He stressed that "NPM sales anywhere in the country hurt all States," that NPM sales in any state reduce payments to every other State," and that "[a]ll States have an interest in reducing NPM sales in every State."

The "Allocable Share Release Repeal" ("ASR Repeal") revised the originally enacted escrow statute's refund calculation to remove the reference to the enacting state's "allocable share" of the annual MSA payments. HN2The amended statute, therefore, now provides that an NPM will be entitled to a refund[t]o the extent that a tobacco product manufacturer establishes that the amount it was required to place into escrow, based on units sold in the state ... in a particular year, was greater than the [MSA] payments, as determined pursuant to section IX(i) of that agreement including, after final determination of all adjustments, that such manufacturer would have been required to make based on such units sold had it been a participating manufacturer, the excess shall be released from escrow and revert to such tobacco product manufacturer.

Thus, an NPM still has to pay annually into a state's escrow fund an amount calculated by multiplying the number of cigarettes the NPM sells in that state during the year in question by the same per-cigarette amount for that year as set forth in the state's escrow statute. The NPM can obtain a refund to the extent those escrowed funds are greater than the amount that the NPM would have had to pay under the MSA for that same year, based upon that same number of cigarettes sold.

== Criticism ==
Some anti-smoking advocates, such as William Godshall, have criticized the MSA as being too lenient on the major tobacco companies. In a speech at the National Tobacco Control Conference, Godshall stated that "[w]ith unprecedented future legal protection granted by the state A.G.s in exchange for money, it appears that the tobacco industry has emerged from the state lawsuits even more powerful".

An article in the Journal of the National Cancer Institute described the MSA as an "opportunity lost to curb cigarette use", citing public health researchers' views that not enough of the MSA money was being spent on anti-smoking measures. Dr. Stephen A. Schroeder wrote in the New England Journal of Medicine that "Although U.S. smoking rates are slowly declining, progress toward that end [decreasing smoking] would be faster if federal policymaking matched both the rigor of the scientific evidence against tobacco use and the resolve of antitobacco advocates." In 2005, cigarette sales reached a 55-year low and had fallen by over 21 percent since the settlement was negotiated. State governments have used the settlement money to fill budget holes, build golf courses or even subsidize the tobacco industry. Less than 3% of every dollar is being spent on tobacco prevention programs with childhood smoking programs the most underfunded. As of 2020, more than $138 billion has been paid out.

Another criticism is the alleged favoritism shown to the major tobacco companies over smaller independent tobacco growers and sellers. Proponents of this argument claim that certain restrictions on pricing make it more difficult for small growers to compete with "Big Tobacco". Twelve states have successfully fought against this argument in court during the last two years and the enforcement of the MSA continues throughout the United States in perpetuity.

Fellows within the Cato Institute, which has received multiple donations from the tobacco industry and been one of the "national allies" of tobacco company Philip Morris, such as Robert Levy, assert that the lawsuit that brought on the tobacco settlement was instigated by a need to make beneficiary payments to Medicaid recipients. Following the passage of laws that eliminated the tobacco companies' ability to provide evidence in court for their defense, the tobacco companies were forced to settle. The big four tobacco companies agreed to pay the state governments several billion dollars but the government in turn was to protect the big four tobacco companies from competition. The Master Settlement Agreement, they argue, created an unconstitutional cartel arrangement that benefited both the government and big tobacco.

Robert Levy states:

For 40 years, tobacco companies had not been held liable for cigarette-related illnesses. Then, beginning in 1994, led by Florida, states across the country sued big tobacco to recover public outlays for medical expenses due to smoking. By changing the law to guarantee they would win in court, the states extorted a quarter-trillion-dollar settlement, which was passed along in higher cigarette prices. Basically, the tobacco companies had money; the states and their hired-gun attorneys wanted money; so the companies paid and the states collected. Then sick smokers got stuck with the bill.

The argument the Master Settlement Agreement created a cartel of the major U.S. cigarette makers, allowing them to charge "supracompetitive" prices for their product, was rejected by the U.S. Court of Appeals for the Ninth Circuit in 2007. The appellate court concluded that the Plaintiffs had not alleged sufficient facts to show that the MSA and two related state laws violated the federal Sherman Act.

== Securitization ==
In the ten years following the settlement, many state and local governments have opted to sell so-called Tobacco bonds. They are a form of securitization. In many cases the bonds permit state and local governments to transfer the risk of declines in future master settlement agreement payments to bondholders. In some cases, however, the bonds are backed by secondary pledges of state or local revenues, which creates what some see as a perverse incentive to support the tobacco industry, on whom they are now dependent for future payments against this debt.

Tobacco revenue has fallen more quickly than projected when the securities were created, leading to technical defaults in some states. Some analysts predict that many of the bonds will default entirely. Many of the longer-term bonds have been downgraded to junk ratings. More recently, financial analysts began raising concerns that the rapid growth of the electronic cigarette market is accelerating the decline of $97 billion outstanding in tobacco bonds. States with large populations, such as New York and California, are affected to a greater degree than others. Lawmakers in several states proposed measures to tax e-cigarettes like traditional tobacco products to offset the decline in TMSA revenue. They anticipate that taxing or banning e-cigarettes would be beneficial to the sale of combustible cigarettes.

== See also ==
- Howard Engle
- InJustice, a 2011 documentary about lawyers manipulating class action lawsuits, including tobacco settlements
- Operation Berkshire
- Project SCUM
- Tobacco in the United States
- Tobacco Settlement Financing Corporation
- "Truth" ad campaign
- Truth Initiative
- United States v. Philip Morris

== Bibliography ==
- Michael Pertschuk (2001). Smoke in Their Eyes: Lessons in Movement Leadership from the Tobacco Wars. Vanderbilt University Press. ISBN 9780826513939.
- Smoke in Their Eyes focuses on public health leadership. About the tobacco companies, see Ashes to Ashes by Richard Kluger; for the attorneys general litigation, see The People vs. Big Tobacco by Carrick Mollenkamp, Jeffrey Rothfeder, Adam Levy and Joseph Menn, as well as Cornered by Peter Pringle; and for the role of the administration, see A Question of Intent by David Kessler.
