= Bolad (given name) =

Bolad (alternatively spelled Pulad, Pulat, Polat, or Polad in Persian and Turkic languages) is common given name among the Inner Asian peoples. The meaning of the word Bolad is "steel". In Khalkha Mongolian form of the word is Bold.

Notable people with the name include:

- Bolad, the medieval Mongolian intellectual and representative of the Khagan in Iran
- Pulad, Khan of the Golden Horde in the 15th century
- Bars Bolud Jinong, Mongolian leader and prince in the 16th century

== See also ==
- Bold (Mongolian name)
