= USS Bold (AM-424) =

Minesweeper of the United States Navy

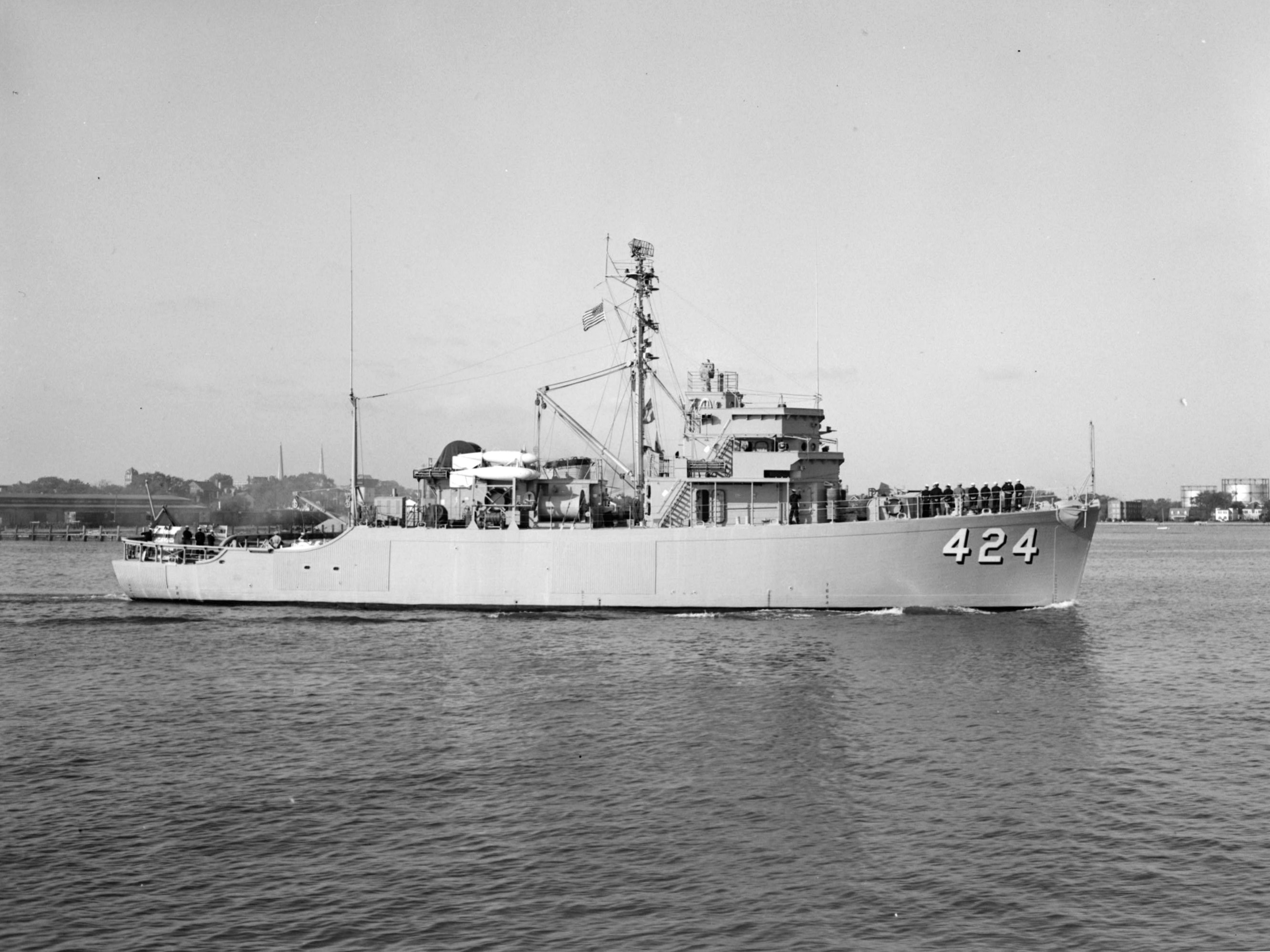

History

United States
- Builder: Norfolk Naval Shipyard
- Laid down: 12 December 1951
- Launched: 14 March 1953
- Acquired: 5 October 1953
- Commissioned: 25 September 1953
- Decommissioned: 2 July 1971
- Reclassified: MSO-424, 7 February 1955
- Stricken: 28 February 1975
- Fate: Sold, June 1981

General characteristics
- Class & type: Agile-class minesweeper
- Displacement: 775 tons
- Length: 172 ft (52.43 m)
- Beam: 36 ft (10.97 m)
- Draught: 10 ft (3.05 m)
- Propulsion: Four Packard ID1700 diesel engines, two shafts, two controllable pitch propellers
- Speed: 14 knots
- Complement: 70
- Armament: 1 40 mm., 2 .50 cal (12.7 mm) mg

USS Bold (MSO-424) was an Agile-class minesweeper acquired by the United States Navy for the task of clearing mines that had been placed in the water to prevent the safe passage of ships.

Bold was laid down on 12 December 1951 by the Norfolk Naval Shipyard; launched on 14 March 1953; sponsored by Mrs. Porter Hardy Jr.; and commissioned on 25 September 1953.

== Special sea trials ==
Bold did not report for normal duty with the Mine Force for 17 months after her commissioning. Instead, following outfitting at Norfolk, Virginia, and a brief training period in Chesapeake Bay, she began a series of special trials in conjunction with the Bureau of Ships, the Norfolk Naval Shipyard, and the New York Naval Shipyard. Those trials lasted from early October 1953 to early June 1954.

== East Coast operations ==
At the end of the first week in June 1954, Bold finally embarked upon her delayed shakedown cruise that she conducted off the New England coast. At the end of the summer of 1954, the minesweeper entered the Norfolk Naval Shipyard for five months of modifications and post-shakedown repairs. On 7 February 1955 near the end of the overhaul, Bold was reclassified an ocean minesweeper and redesignated MSO-424.

On 15 February 1955, after nearly a year and a half of active duty, the warship entered port at the home of the Atlantic Fleet Mine Force, Charleston, South Carolina, for the first time in her career. That spring, after three weeks of intensive training, Bold participated in her first annual minesweeping exercise. On 2 May, she stood out of Charleston in company with the other ships of Mine Division (MinDiv) 83 to embark on her first deployment to the Mediterranean Sea. She and her division mates arrived in Lisbon, Portugal, on 18 May and, soon thereafter, joined the 6th Fleet in the Mediterranean. During the ensuing four months, the minesweeper made port visits and conducted bilateral minesweeping exercises with units of the navies of Italy, Greece, and Spain. Bold concluded that tour of duty in the latter part of September and reentered Charleston, South Carolina, on 4 October.

After five weeks of the relative inactivity that usually follows a deployment, she steamed south early in November to enter the drydock of a civilian contractor at Jacksonville, Florida. When those repairs were completed in mid-December, Bold moved to the Naval Mine Defense Laboratory at Panama City, Florida, where she spent the first five months of 1956 assisting in the development of technology and tactics relative to mine warfare. In June, the minesweeper returned to Charleston, where she began a four-month overhaul at the Charleston Naval Shipyard. She completed that repair period in October and embarked upon a schedule of training missions in the local operating area in preparation for deployment to the Mediterranean again in January 1957.

== Second Mediterranean cruise ==
Midway through the first week in January, Bold set out across the Atlantic with the other units of MinDiv 83. She entered the Mediterranean during the last week of the month and began five months of the usual drills, exercises, and port calls associated with a 6th Fleet assignment. She arrived back in Charleston, South Carolina, on 16 June and remained there through the middle of July for the normal post-deployment leave and upkeep period.

At that time, the minesweeper sailed north to Yorktown, Virginia, where she served as a training vehicle for the Mine Warfare School and whence she participated in a major Atlantic Fleet mine warfare exercise in the vicinity of the Virginia Capes. Bold returned south at the beginning of September, made a brief visit to Charleston, and then continued south to Key West, Florida, where she carried out missions for the Mine Development Detachment located there. She completed that assignment in mid-October and reentered Charleston on the 20th. For the remainder of 1957, the warship pursued a routine schedule of independent ship's exercises out of her home port.

== Overhaul at Charleston ==
Normal operations out of Charleston occupied her time during the first quarter of 1958 as well. On 28 March 1958, however, Bold began an overhaul at the Charleston Naval Shipyard that consumed the next 16 weeks. The minesweeper devoted the balance of the summer to refresher training and preparations for overseas movement. She stood out of Charleston on 29 September and arrived at Gibraltar on 16 October. She made port visits and conducted exercises in the "middle sea" for a little less than four months before heading back to the United States early in 1959. Bold sailed back into her home port on 11 February 1959 and commenced post-deployment standdown.

The warship resumed normal activity at the beginning of March. She carried out a special project for the Commander, Mine Force, Atlantic Fleet, between 8 and 10 March and then visited Savannah, Georgia, for St. Patrick's Day. Bold spent the first 10 days of April undergoing repairs at a civilian drydock in Charleston and then took up the usual training evolutions in the local operating area once again. She continued so employed through the end of the year and during the first two months of 1960.

== Norfolk shipyard overhaul ==
On 2 March 1960, the minesweeper entered the Norfolk Naval Shipyard for regular overhaul. She completed the repairs early in May and returned to Charleston on the 12th. Refresher training and minesweeping drills took up the balance of May and most of June. On 28 June, Bold departed Charleston for a midshipman training cruise to the West Indies that lasted through the summer. She arrived back in Charleston on 13 September but, after two weeks alongside a tender, got underway again on 2 October. The ship steamed north to Canadian waters where she participated in Operation Sweep Clear V. Bold returned to Charleston from that exercise on 26 October and resumed the familiar roles of training vehicle and test platform, for the Mine Warfare School and the mine service tests, respectively.

Normal duty along the Atlantic seaboard continued into the early months of 1961. On 10 April 1961, Bold departed Charleston in company with the rest of MinDiv 83 on her way to another tour of duty with the United States Sixth Fleet. Over the ensuing six months, she operated as an element of Task Force (TF) 62, conducting exercises and visiting a number of Mediterranean ports. The minesweeper returned to Charleston in October and spent the remainder of 1961 in port preparing for and executing a yard overhaul.

Bold completed repairs early in February 1962 and devoted the rest of the month and most of March to refresher training. In April, the minesweeper participated in amphibious exercises at Vieques Island, near Puerto Rico, and at Onslow Beach, North Carolina. The month of May brought upkeep in Charleston and, in June, she traveled to Panama City, Florida, where she provided services to the Navy's Mine Defense Laboratory.

== West Indies cruise ==
On 20 July, after nearly three weeks back at her home port, USS Bold got underway for a four-month cruise to the West Indies. When not engaged in exercises, she made liberty calls at such places as Guantánamo Bay, San Juan, Santo Domingo in the Dominican Republic, and Ocho Rios in Jamaica. Bold returned to Charleston on 9 November and, following a tender availability, resumed local operations on the 21st. Though occasionally called upon to perform special missions at various locations along the east coast, the minesweeper generally stayed close to her home port for the next 18 months.

That employment came to an end late in the spring of 1964. On 15 May, she stood out of Charleston in company with her division mates for another deployment to the Mediterranean Sea. She made a stop along the way at Bermuda and arrived at Málaga, Spain, on 3 June. Bold participated in several amphibious exercises and other training evolutions and visited a number of ports on the shores of the Mediterranean. After about five months of such duty, she departed Huelva, Spain, on 30 October to return to the United States. Arriving back in Charleston on 17 November, Bold spent the remainder of the year in port.

== Drydock period in Savannah ==
Bold began 1965 with normal operations out of Charleston. Early in February, however, she entered the yard at the Savannah Machine & Foundry for an interim drydock period. The minesweeper completed those repairs at the beginning of March and resumed normal duty at Charleston. At the end of June, Bold departed her home port in company with her colleagues of MinDiv 83 and set a course for the Gulf of Mexico, where she occupied the following month carrying out missions in support of the Mine Defense Laboratory at Panama City, Florida. She and her division mates left the Florida panhandle on 1 August and, after making a port call at Veracruz, Mexico, reentered Charleston on the 17th. The minesweeper spent most of what remained of 1965 in port at Charleston preparing for a regular overhaul projected for the beginning of 1966.

The overhaul began on schedule in mid-January, and Bold emerged from the Jacksonville Shipyard at Charleston on 19 April. After sea trials, she resumed local operations out of Charleston and remained so occupied until the beginning of August. On 5 August, the minesweeper put to sea for three weeks of special operations near Puerto Rico. She returned to Charleston on 29 August. On 26 September, Bold plunged into two months of intensive exercises, three weeks of refresher training followed by another four weeks of type training. That demanding schedule ended with her return to Charleston on 20 November. The warship concluded the year with an extended period of relative inactivity in her home port.

== Tour of duty with the Sixth Fleet ==
She began 1967 with type training carried out in cooperation with her colleagues of MinDiv 83. Between early February and mid-March, the minesweeper underwent repairs at the Jacksonville Shipyard in Charleston in preparation for another tour of duty with the 6th Fleet. Bold embarked upon that deployment on 30 March. She and her division mates arrived at Gibraltar on 16 April and became elements of Task Unit (TU) 61.7.3. For almost five months the minesweeper ranged the length and breadth of the Mediterranean Sea, participating in a variety of exercises both multinational and unilateral in character. When not so engaged, the warship made liberty calls and goodwill visits to ports throughout the Mediterranean. Following turnover formalities at Rota, Spain, Bold headed back to the United States on 2 September. She returned to Charleston on the 16th and stood down for about a month to allow her crew ample opportunity to take post-deployment leave.

Bold resumed local operations late in October but did not really accelerate to a normal pace until the beginning of 1968 when she began service as a training platform for the Mine Warfare School. She alternated duty as a school ship with periods of type training and independent ship's exercises during the first four months of 1968. On 6 May, the minesweeper entered Detyen's Shipyard at Mt. Pleasant, South Carolina, for an 11-week overhaul. Bold left the yard on 22 July and took up normal operations at the end of the month. Early in October while carrying out a mission in support of the Naval Ordnance Laboratory Test Facility at Fort Lauderdale, Florida, she suffered damage to her main propulsion plant that put her in the Jacksonville Shipyard for two months. Bold returned to active service in December just in time to put to sea with USS Bulwark (MSO-425) on the 20th to search for an aircraft that had gone down at sea off the Virginia Capes. The search proved unsuccessful, and she returned to Charleston late Christmas Eve.

The minesweeper began 1969 with refresher training out of her home port. In February, she assisted Atlantic Fleet destroyers in quality assurance testing on their weapons systems. Type training conducted along the coasts of South Carolina and Florida occupied the month of March. On 1 May, Bold departed Charleston with MinDiv 83 bound for a month of exercises in the Caribbean Sea codenamed Operation Halcon Vista IV. Upon her return to Charleston at the beginning of June, she resumed local operations. During the fall, she underwent an interim drydocking at the Jacksonville Shipyard and participated in quality assurance testing on weapons for Atlantic Fleet destroyers once again.

== Decommissioning ==
In January 1970, Bold embarked upon her final year of active service with the United States Navy. In those last 12 months, the minesweeper carried out normal operations along the southern portion of the Atlantic seaboard. In January 1971, she began preparations for inactivation. Bold was decommissioned at Charleston on 2 July 1971, and she remained there, in reserve, until early in 1975. Her name was struck from the Navy list on 28 February 1975, and she was sold to Tucson One Hour, Inc., of Cincinnati, Ohio, in June 1981.
