= Bold (Mongolian name) =

Bold is a Mongolian name, and Boldyn is the patronymic of Bold. Notable people with the name include:

- Bold Dorjsuren (born 1978), Mongolian singer, producer, and television personality
- Buyandelgeriin Bold (born 1960), Mongolian wrestler
- Nomin Bold (born 1982), Mongolian painter
- Boldbaataryn Bold-Erdene (born 1983), Mongolian cyclist
- Boldyn Byambadorj (born 1991), Mongolian cross-country skier
- Boldyn Buman-Uchral (born 1971), Mongolian footballer
- Boldyn Gankhaich (born 1995), Mongolian judoka

== See also ==
- Bolad (given name)
