= USS Bold (BAT-8) =

Favourite-class tugboat of the United States Navy

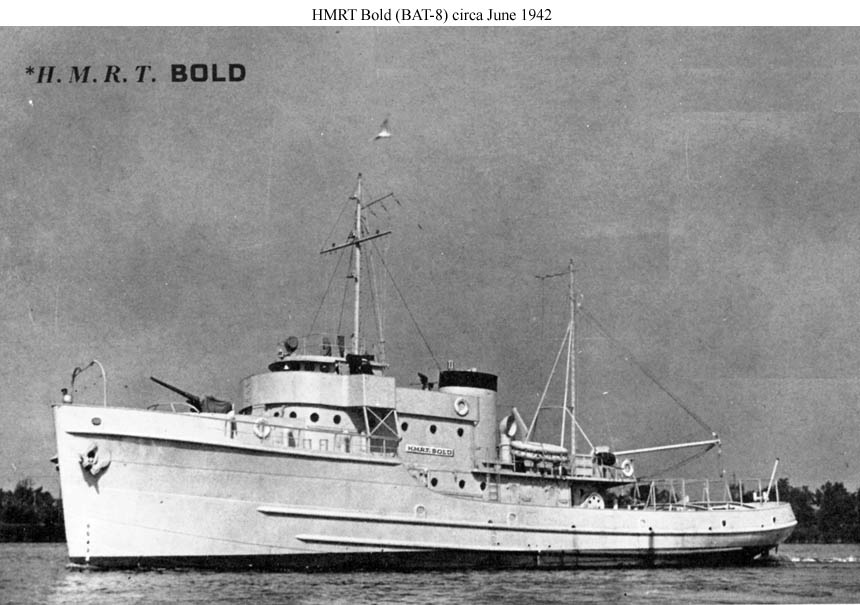

History

United Kingdom
- Name: HMS Bold (W114)
- Acquired: 29 June 1942
- Fate: Returned to the United States Navy, January 1946

United States
- Name: USS Bold (BAT-8)
- Acquired: from Royal Navy, January 1946
- Stricken: 17 July 1947
- Fate: Sold for scrap, 29 June 1948

General characteristics
- Type: Favourite classTugboat
- Displacement: 835 tons full
- Length: 143 ft
- Beam: 33 ft 10 in (extreme)
- Draft: 13 ft 2 in (limiting)
- Propulsion: one General Motors Diesel-electric model 12-278A single Fairbanks Morse Main Reduction Gear Ship's Service Generators one Diesel-drive 60 kW 120 V D.C. one Diesel-drive 30 kW 120 V D.C. single propeller, 1,500shp
- Speed: 13 knots
- Complement: 45
- Armament: 1 x 3"/50 caliber gun 2 x single 20mm gun mounts

USS Bold (BAT-8), was a Favourite class tugboat built for the British along the lines of American ATR-1-class rescue tugs. She was transferred to the United Kingdom on 29 June 1942 and was operated as HMS Bold (W114) by the Royal Navy.

She was returned to the United States Navy at Subic Bay in the Philippines in January 1946. Bold was struck from the Navy List on 17 July 1947. On 29 June 1948, she was sold to Bosey, Philippines, though never delivered. On 2 October 1948, Bosey resold her to T. Y. Fong.
