= Youth smoking =

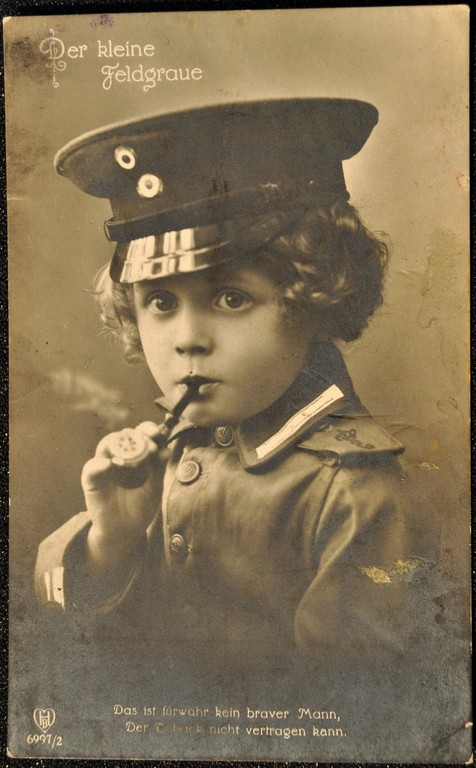
A German postcard from the First World War, which reads: "He is verily not a brave man, if he cannot stand tobacco."

Youth smoking is an issue that affects countries worldwide. While the extent to which smoking is viewed as a negative health behavior may vary across different nations, it remains an issue regardless of how it is perceived by different societies. The United States has taken numerous measures—ranging from changes in national policy surrounding youth cigarette access to changes in media campaigns—in attempts to eliminate the use of tobacco products among adolescents. Approximately 90% of smokers begin smoking prior to the age of 18.

== History ==
By the late 19th century, youth smoking in the United States and the United Kingdom became linked to "physical deterioration". A great number of prominent medical figures argued that smoking caused the British population to degenerate physically, as it was believed to interfere with the strength of growing boys.

The children's act of 1908, often called the "Children's Charter", was one of the earliest government measures to regulate youth smoking. By law it became a criminal offence to sell cigarettes, tobacco, or cigarette papers to anyone under the age of 16. The act also expanded police powers, constables and park-keepers in uniform were authorized to seize tobacco from any person "apparently under the age of sixteen" smoking in a public place.

=== Statistics ===
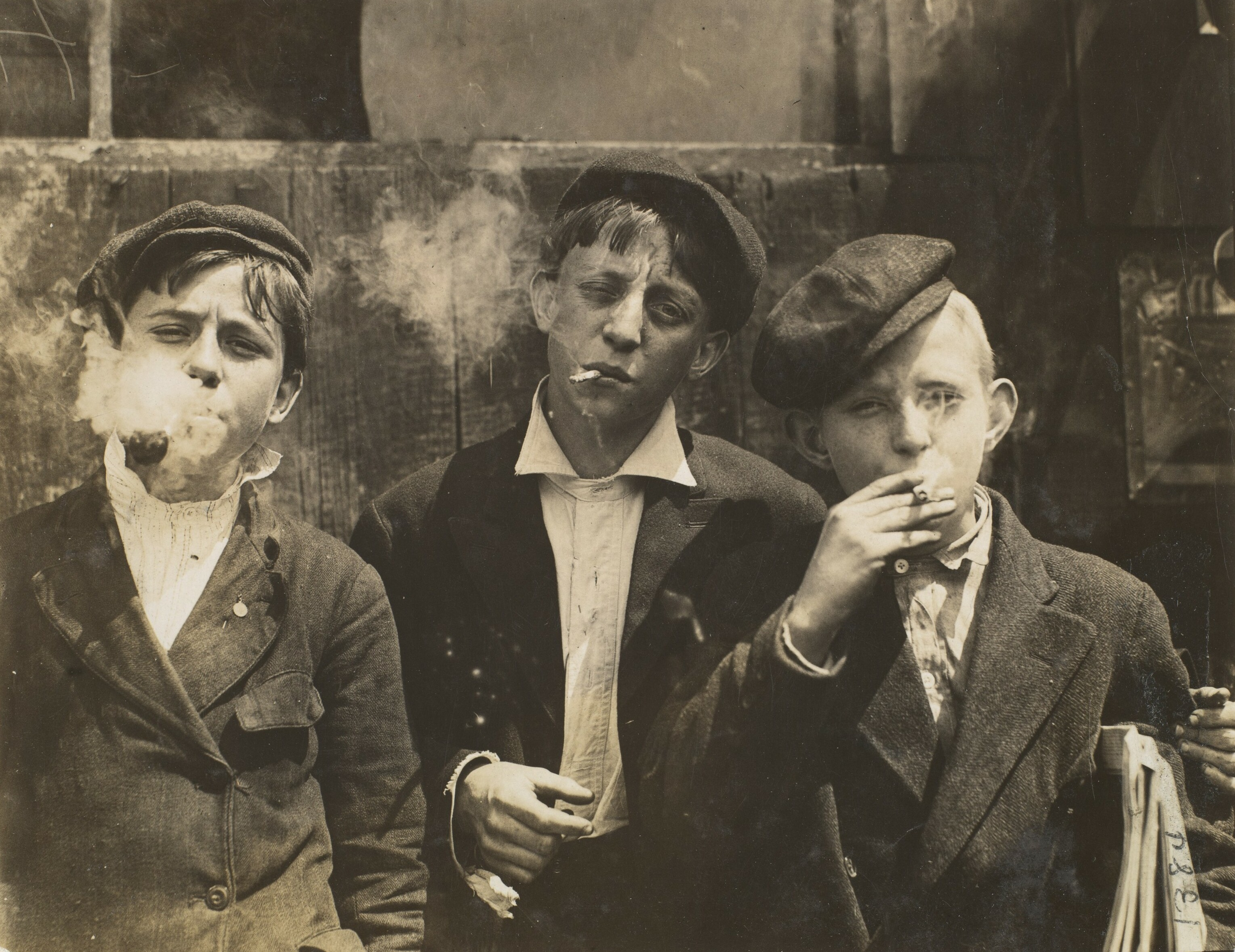
Newsboys in St. Louis, 1910

While the rates of cigarette smoking among adults and adolescents have declined in the past ten years in the United States, a considerable number of adolescents continue to smoke cigarettes. The Surgeon General's Warning released in 1964 was a major impetus for this change. In 1965, approximately 45% of Americans smoked, however by 2022, an estimated 11.6% of adults (about 28.8 million people) were current cigarette smokers, reflecting a substantial decline over time. The pattern of smoking among youth has had a slightly different trajectory, such that smoking rates for high school students began to increase in the early 1990s and did not begin to decrease until the end of the decade. If the current smoking trends continue, 5.6 million youths alive today will die prematurely. According to economist Kenneth Warner, the tobacco industry needs 5,000 new young smokers every day to maintain the total number of smokers.

In 2020, the Center for Disease Control and Prevention (CDC) estimated that upwards of 4 million middle school and high school students in the United States currently used tobacco products.

Survey data from the National Youth Tobacco Survey from 2015–2024 show that e-cigarettes were the most commonly reported tobacco product among both middle school and high school students throughout the period. E-cigarette use rose sharply in the late 2010s and reached a peak in 2019, when 27.5% of high school students and 10.5% of middle school students reported current (past 30-day) use. After 2019, e-cigarette use declined overall, falling to 7.8% among high school students and 3.5% among middle school students by 2024.The same survey data also show a substantial decline in cigarette smoking over the 2015–2024 period. Among high school students, cigarette use decreased from 9.3% (2015) to 1.7% (2024). Among middle school students, it declined from 2.3% (2015) to 1.1% (2024), with rates remaining near or below roughly one to two percent in the early 2020s.

National epidemiological surveys often deliver key findings on the proportion of youth that are consuming tobacco. The National Youth Tobacco Surveys (NYTS) was designed to provide data on middle school and high school students tobacco behaviors, as well as attitudes, beliefs, and exposure to pro- and anti- tobacco influences. Results from the 2011-2016 NYTS revealed that approximately 20.2% of high school students (grades 9-12) reported current tobacco use, which was defined as having used any tobacco product in the past 30 days. In further support of these findings, the National Survey on Drug Use and Health (NSDUH) is a prominent epidemiological survey that assesses national and state-level information on alcohol, tobacco, illicit drug use, as well as mental health, in the United States. The NSDUH defines current cigarette smoking as smoking all or part of a cigarette over the past 30 days. The 2012 NSDUH survey revealed that 6.6% of youth between the ages of 12 and 17 were current cigarette smokers. Females and males had similar prevalence estimates, 6.3% and 6.8% respectively. The demographic breakdown was such that Caucasian youth exhibited the greatest prevalence of smoking (8.2%), followed by Hispanic or Latino youth (4.8%) and African-American youth (4.1%). Breakdown by age revealed the age range between 16 and 17 had highest prevalence (13.6%), followed by the 14 to 15 age range (4.6%), and the 12 to 13 age range (1.2%). In terms of socioeconomic status, there was a greater prevalence of youth currently smoking below the poverty level (7.6%) than at or above the poverty level (6.2%). An examination of regional differences across the United States demonstrated the highest prevalence of smoking among adolescents in the Midwest (7.8%) and South (7.2%) regions, followed by the Northeast (5.7%) and West (5.1%) regions. Results from these epidemiological studies underscore the continued prevalence of cigarette smoking among adolescents. Prevention and control measures that reduce smoking in among adolescents can improve the nation's short- and long-term health.

=== Tobacco laws and regulation ===
In most developed countries, the minimum age of tobacco usage and purchase is 18, or the age of majority. IThe Public Health Cigarette Smoking Act of 1969 banned all tobacco marketing advertising on television and radio, with many countries following in later years in the US. In 2012, Australia became the first country in the world to mandate standardized plain packaging intended to make cigarettes less appealing to new and existing smokers, especially adolescents and those focused on a personal brand image. Since then, more countries have adopted plain packaging and large warning labels, especially European countries like Belgium, France, and the United Kingdom, among others.

== Stages in youth smoking ==
Youth who begin smoking pass through various stages, each influenced by a variety of factors, before becoming a daily smoker. The stages can progress in any direction and stop or restart any number of times.

Stage 1: Pre-contemplation/preparation – Youth in this stage have never smoked and most likely have minimal desires to begin smoking. Adolescents in this stage are likely impervious to the effects of social pressures for smoking or do not view smoking in a positive light.

Stage 2: Contemplation/Preparation – An adolescent's beliefs about smoking are beginning to change as they begin to contemplate smoking. Youth will often develop attitudes or envision what smoking will be like before engaging initiating. Notably, these attitudes towards smoking may often be negative, but are not as salient nor impactful to the adolescent because of either positive media messages or role models (i.e. parents who are smokers). Adolescents in this stage begin to consider the function of smoking, with popular reasons including smoking to be cool or independent, reduce social anxiety, and regulate emotions.

Stage 3: Initiation – This stage consists of an adolescent trying an initial cigarette(s). Typically, there are stronger peer or familial influences motivating this initial behavior. Adolescents may also desire to improve their self-image if they are receiving minimal approval from their desired peers further increasing the chances of initiation.

Stage 4: Experimentation – During this stage, there is a steady increase in the frequency of cigarette use, as well as the various situations in which cigarettes are used. There is an imbalance between positive and negative values placed on cigarettes, such that an adolescent adopts increasingly positive views on cigarette smoking. An adolescent smoker in this stage is not guaranteed to be a regular smoker and still has the option of quitting. Among smokers in this category who are likely to become regular smokers, the negative aspects of smoking such as the burning sensation or heat are reduced, and more positive benefits are emphasized. While there can be acute initial positive effects from smoking (i.e. increased heart rate and nervous system stimulation), smoking during this and the subsequent stage may be associated with some of the more severe physiological consequences of smoking. Additionally, youth in this stage may begin to associate themselves with a personal identity of being a smoker as they are learning how to smoke (i.e. how to handle a cigarette, inhale correctly, etc.).

Stage 5: Regular Smoking – Smoking throughout this stage becomes less infrequent and more regular. Regular smoking in youth can vary from smoking at social gatherings or smoking on a majority of weekdays. Adolescents in this category are not characterized as smoking daily or in high rates.

Stage 6: Established/Daily Smoking – Not all adolescent smokers from the previous stage move to this stage, although a large proportion do progress to daily smoking. Adolescent smokers in this stage may begin to experience symptoms associated with nicotine dependence such as strong cravings or withdrawal symptoms. At this point, a combination of physiological and biological factors maintains the smoking behavior as part of the adolescent's self-regulation.

Previous research has examined the differential effects various influences can have at different stages of smoking. Connectedness to one's family, and being a member of a Hispanic or Asian ethnic group, were found to be protective against smoking across never smokers, experimenters, and regular smokers. Risk factors across all three smoking status' included maternal smoking or greater depressive symptoms. Maternal smoking may be a greater risk factor among daughters than sons. An additional major risk factor is alcohol use, which has been demonstrated as being more influential during the earlier stages of smoking. Research shows that smoking and alcohol use often co-occur in adolescents.

== Causes ==
=== Demographic factors ===
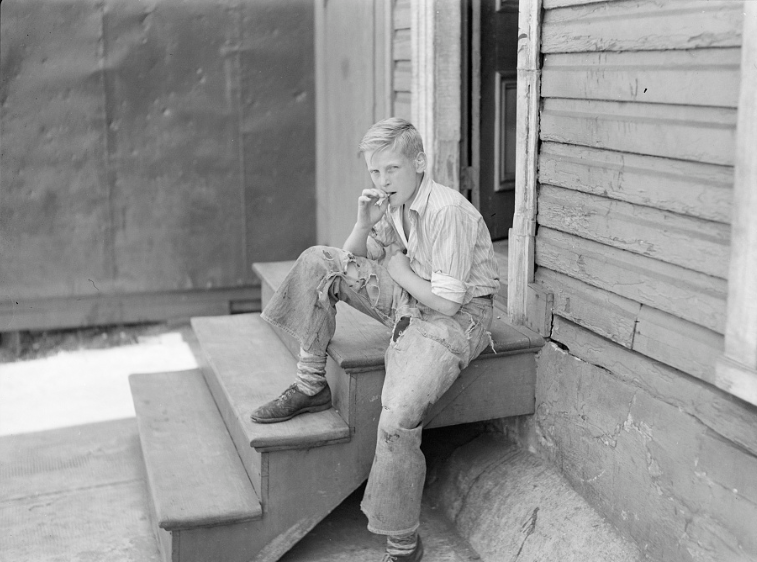
Smoking boy in Baltimore slum area during the Great Depression, 1938

Research has shown that there are certain personal factors that are correlated with higher usage of cigarettes and other tobacco products. Age has been identified as a risk factor, such that older adolescents are more likely to have higher rates of regular cigarette and other tobacco product use than younger adolescents. However, older adolescents have a reduced risk of initiation smoking with reasoning stemming around an older adolescent being less susceptible than a younger adolescent in engaging in the initial smoking process. In terms of gender, males smoke more cigarettes per day, use cigarettes with higher nicotine content, and inhale smoke more deeply. Males have also demonstrated increased satisfaction from their cigarette, as well as shorter latency between the time they wake up in the morning and when they have their first cigarette, which are signs of greater nicotine dependence. Females continue to experience environmental pressure to smoke. In an examination of gender differences in adolescent smoking, Branstetter and colleagues (2012) found that females were more often surrounded by family members and romantic partners that smoked cigarettes.

Ethnicity and educational status have also been associated with differential rates of cigarette smoking. Results from the 2014 NSDUH revealed that Caucasian adolescents are more likely to smoke cigarettes than African-American adolescents. These results are consistent with previous results of African-American adolescents having consistently lower rates of smoking initiation and progression to daily smoking. Hispanic youth have also been shown to have an increased risk of smoking onset as well. For educational status, youth who did not endorse pursuing higher education, such as attending college, were more likely than their peers to be smokers. Furthermore, adolescents whose parents with minimal college education were more likely to become smokers.

=== Psychosocial factors ===
Certain interpersonal social factors have been associated with cigarette smoking. Adolescents who are involved in antisocial behaviors, such as fighting, stealing, and using other drugs are more likely to smoke than those who do not engage in antisocial behaviors. Parents exert a highly robust effect on a child's smoking behavior. An examination of parental influences found that youth whose parents smoked cigarettes had a greater likelihood of smoking cigarettes, and this effect increased with the number of smoking parents in the home. The timespan in which a child is exposed to parental smoking has also been associated with increased risk of smoking. A negative association does appear to exist between parental smoking and an adolescent's first cigarette such that parents who smoked had a stronger negative response to a child's first cigarette. Notably, the effect of parental smoking can differ by a few important factors. There was a greater effect of father smoking on boys than girls, the effects of the father smoking depended on if the father lived at home with the adolescent, and there was a greater effect of parental smoking on youth under the age of 13. Extending beyond parents, siblings may also exert an effect on adolescent smoking. An examination over 400 families with at least two adolescents between the ages of 13 and 17 found that adolescents with an older sibling who smoked were more likely begin smoking themselves approximately one year later. However, younger adolescents smoking behavior did not affect older adolescents smoking behavior. If either older or younger sibling had a best friend that smoked, they were more likely to smoke approximately one year later.

An additional realm of risk factors falls underneath that of stress. Specifically, youth who experience numerous highly stressful events throughout childhood are at increased risk of beginning to smoke by the age of 14. Particularly important stressors that contribute to this early onset of cigarette smoking include experiencing parental separation, being witness or victim to abuse, or residing in a household with a family member that is incarcerated or has a mental disorder. An adolescent's home environment may also influence the perceptions they have about cigarette use. Since tobacco use among youth reached a peak in the 1990s, perceptions that cigarettes are harmful has increased, which has been a critical contributor the declining rates over the past twenty years. However, many adolescent smokers view themselves as having minimal to no risk from smoking cigarettes throughout the first few years that they are smoking. While many adolescent smokers acknowledge that there are risks to cigarette smoking, they do not seem to understand the imminent risk and thus continue to smoke. The perceived risks associated with smoking that youth often adopt have been associated with various indicators of nicotine dependence. In a study examining the association between perceived tobacco dependence and smoking susceptibility among adolescent who were minimal smokers, perceived mental dependence on tobacco, and not perceived physical dependence, was associated with smoking susceptibility. Thus, adolescents perceived psychological dependence appears to be an important risk factor for vulnerability to smoking. Adolescents place less weight on the physical dependence to nicotine that can develop and perpetuate their smoking behavior.

=== Biological factors ===
While many of these environmental risk factors may exert a strong effect, there are also a series of biological risk factors that may increase the likelihood of an adolescent becoming a cigarette smoker. An examination of adolescents ranging in age from 12 to 19 found that heritability estimates for initiation of smoking ranged from 36% to 56% across varying samples, with similar heritability estimates for regular smoking ranging from 27% to 52%. Genome wide association studies and sequencing are still in progress to examine which relevant genetic variants exert robust contributions to cigarette smoking behavior. These genetic risk factors do not operate in isolation from environmental risk factors, rather they often function synergistically to influence smoking behavior. For example, school environment (i.e. school smoking norms, prevalence of student smoking, etc.) has been shown to moderate the genetic risk factor for smoking in adolescents.

== Consequences ==
Numerous health consequences for cigarette smoking have been thoroughly documented. The top negative health causes that have been causally linked to cigarette smoking include cancers of the upper digestive tract, lung cancer, and chronic diseases including diabetes, coronary heart diseases, pneumonia, and overall poorer immune function. While many of these cancers and diseases can develop when an individual is of an older age, changes in one's physical well-being contributing to these diseases may begin during adolescence. In a study examining nearly 10,000 males and females ranging in age from ten to eighteen across the United States, adolescents who smoked cigarettes exhibited impaired pulmonary function. Adolescent smokers exhibited delayed growth in lung function, as well as mild airway obstruction. While heart disease and stroke are consequences more commonly seen in adulthood, early signs of these effects can often be found in adolescent smokers. In addition, resting heart rate of young adult smokers is estimated to beat two to three minutes faster than non-young adult smokers. Youth smokers are also less likely to visit a doctor regularly, and suffer from greater shortness of breath and build up phlegm, than non-youth smokers.

In addition to physical negative health consequences, adolescent smoking has also been linked to negative psychological consequences. Heavy cigarette smoking throughout adolescence was associated with increased risk of generalized anxiety disorder, panic disorder, and agoraphobia in early adulthood. They are also less likely to visit a mental health care provider for emotional or psychological concerns that may arise. In addition to psychological consequences, adolescent cigarette use has also been linked with subsequent drug use. The Gateway Hypothesis proposes that drug use develops in stages, with early drug use consisting of drugs such as alcohol and tobacco and later dug use consisting of more illicit drug use. Nicotine use itself has been shown to be an early 'gateway' drug that increases risk for subsequent cocaine use.

== Alternative tobacco products ==
=== E-cigarettes ===
One popular trend among adolescent cigarette smokers is the recent rise of e-cigarettes. This phenomenon is also known as vaping but has many other names as well. In 2020, it was estimated that approximately 1.3 million children in the United States smoke. For the first time in 2014, e-cigarette use was higher among adolescents than smoking traditional cigarettes. The most common reasons for using e-cigarettes was to experiment, followed by others reporting e-cigarettes taste good and e-cigarettes to aid in quitting smoking conventional cigarettes. Less students associate e-cigarette with serious risk in comparison to smoking conventional cigarettes. In a nationwide examination as part of the National Youth Tobacco Survey 2011 and 2012 cohort, e-cigarette use was associated with a greater likelihood of having a history or currently being an active cigarette smoker. For individuals that were current smokers, e-cigarette use was associated with higher odds of planning to quit smoking. Among cigarette experimenters, defined in this particular study as having less than one puff of a cigarette, e-cigarette use was associated with lower odds of remaining abstinent from conventional cigarettes. A study of nearly 2,000 high school students found that students who used both e-cigarettes and regular cigarettes had a significantly greater amount of risk factors associated with smoking. In comparison to students who did not smoke, students who used e-cigarettes only or used both e-cigarettes and regular cigarettes more often viewed e-cigarettes as healthier than regular cigarettes. Additionally, there is little disapproval for the use of e-cigarettes among adolescents. The role of e-cigarettes as being primarily a risk or protective factor for traditional cigarette smoking is debatable, however adolescents are very susceptible to the lure that accompanies e-cigarettes. E-cigarettes companies design flavors that make their products seem less harmful than they appear to be. They also associate these products with everyday food items. In 2019, Juul, another e-cigarette company, stopped selling their best-selling flavor pods amid the Trump administration decision on the sale of flavored e-cigarettes. CDC reported that current e-cigarette use among U.S. middle declined from 7.7% in 2023 to 5.9% in 2024, and high school students from 10.0% to 7.8%; a statistically significant decrease overall.

Ultimately, e-cigarettes may play the role of a 'gateway drug' to smoking traditional cigarettes. A new trend among youth is using e-cigarettes to vaporize liquid marijuana which can increase the potency of strain of THC increasing the potential consequences to adolescent brain development.

=== Cigars ===
Following e-cigarettes, the next most commonly used tobacco product among youth are cigars. In 2016 it was estimated that 7.7% of high school students smoked cigars. From 2000 to 2012 there was a surge in adolescent cigar use, with total consumption of cigars nearly doubling among youth. National estimates of current cigar use revealed that while traditional cigarette use is on the decline, cigar use remains as high as 13% among high school students. As of 2024, cigars, cigarillos or little cigars were used by about 1.2% of U.S. middle and high school students (an estimated 330,000 youth) substantially lower than earlier years when high school cigar use exceeded 7%. Co-use between cigarettes and cigars is very common. One study found that of youth who experimented with cigarettes and cigars, approximately 40% of adolescents smoked cigarettes and cigars regularly. Furthermore, cigar use was higher among individuals who smoked multiple tobacco products in comparison to adolescents who only smoked cigars. In terms of individual differences, African-American youth are more likely to use cigars than Caucasian youth. Cigar uses are also more likely to be male and use other tobacco and alcohol products.

While many adolescents may suspect cigars to be less harmful than cigarettes, cigars may be more harmful than cigarettes because they contain far more tar, a higher level of toxins, and contain a higher level of cancer-causing substances. Cigar use is associated with a range of negative health consequences including oral, lung, and esophageal cancer.

=== Smokeless tobacco products ===
Snus is a smokeless tobacco product that was first distributed in Sweden decades ago. There is evidence that shows Swedish snus has successfully emerged as healthier alternative to cigarettes. In Sweden, use of snus is proposed to have lowered the rates of smoking as more individuals are using snus as opposed to traditional cigarettes. This product is only recently coming to market in the United States as the cigarette company Camel launched their Camel Snus product in 2009. Snus use among adolescent groups has worried many leading public health officials. Snus may aid youth in cessation of smoking or in harm reduction, but it can also be used in conjunction with cigarettes and thus increase risk for disease. While snus is often advertised as having less harm than cigarettes, the most significant health effects snus can have include maintaining dependence to cigarettes and using snus as an initial tobacco product before trying other tobacco products. Attractive qualities of snus products to adolescents include that they come in flavors, is a form of spitless tobacco, and they are often advertised as being able to use in public places where traditional cigarette smoking is not allowed.

An additional smokeless tobacco product are orbs. They are one of the newest tobacco products currently being tested on the market is Camel's Orbs. Orbs are dissolvable tobacco pills that come in a variety of flavors such as cinnamon or citrus that resemble breath mints. Similar to snus, they are criticized for their allure to children, imitating candy. With this new product, youth populations have been targeted in a new fashion.

Taken together, smokeless tobacco has increased in use from 2008 to 2010 and rates have remained steady from 2010 to 2015. However, older adolescents have decreased their use of smokeless tobacco products between 2008 and 2011. Thus, while smokeless tobacco is used less commonly than e-cigarettes, traditional cigarettes, or cigars, the lack of decline in smokeless tobacco rates is a public health concern.

== Advertisements ==
=== Media ===
Numerous concerns have been raised regarding how smoking is portrayed by tobacco companies. Smoking is often portrayed in the media as 'cool' and is associated with images of relaxation, success, and freedom. One study examining adolescents' perceptions of smoking in the media found that students are more likely to identify with the stress-relieving and pleasurable effects of cigarette smoking, even when they are aware of the negative consequences of smoking. An additional study found that adolescents who were exposed to movies with a large amount of smoking were nearly three times as likely to experiment with or become regular smokers. For smoking initiation, this effect was most prominent for individuals who were at the lowest risk for becoming a smoker (i.e. adolescents low in sensation seeking).

The Master Settlement Agreement (MSA) aimed to limit the promotional activities of tobacco companies, however since its passing there has been minimal change in advertising. Tobacco brand appearance in R-rated movies decreased by 55.4%, however, PG-13 movies only decreased from 15% to 11.8%. It has been suggested that to decrease exposure, parents should not allow their children to wear anything or place anything in their rooms like posters of celebrities smoking or other things that promote tobacco companies.

=== Tobacco company advertisements ===
Children are more sensitive to tobacco advertisements than adults. The three most heavily advertised cigarette brands are Marlboro, Newport, and Camel. A recent report concluded that most youth smokers prefer one of these three brands. Tobacco companies have a history of advertisement campaigns that have been highly scrutinized by the public. In 1999, Philip Morris ran a series of full-page advertisements in news magazines, which were aimed at parents and conveyed the "forbidden fruit" message. They featured a bowl of fruit or a glass of milk with cookies and then had the questions "What else are you leaving for your kids?" and "What else is within your kids' reach?". In 2000, Philip Morris took a different approach and distributed book covers with the phrase "Think. Don't Smoke." These book covers were distributed to schools in California and had not been authorized previously. These covers, which were meant to make students aware of the potential dangers of smoking while at the same time enticing them to defy parental authority, failed as a result of the intervention of the California Department of Education and Justice. The California Department of Education and Justice sent out a memorandum warning schools about Philip Morris' intent and demanding that Philip Morris recall all of its book covers.

There is some controversy about what is the most effective element of advertisements designed to promote youth tobacco prevention and cessation. One study found that advertisements of normative messages showing that smoking will bring about social disapproval are the best to decrease young adults' intentions of smoking in the future. Other studies have found that advertisements, which are high in sensation valued, based on their "ability to elicit sensory, affective, and arousal responses", are best for getting messages across to youths who are highly susceptible to drug use. Still, other research suggests that personal testimonies, including those of people who have dealt with addiction themselves or have had family members die from tobacco related illnesses are the most effective in deterring youths from initiating tobacco use. Researchers have attributed these discrepancies in what is the most effective method to differences in methods, as well as extraneous variables that are not being controlled for in each experiment, including the emotionality of the advertisement, the quality of production, and how the advertisement was sponsored.

== Prevention ==
While laws passed at the national and state level have reduced the opportunities adolescents have for accessing cigarettes, prevention programs at the school level have proven less effective. Systematic reviews of school-based smoking prevention curricula have found that some programmes, particularly those emphasising social competence or combining social competence with social influence approaches, are associated with modest but statistically significant reductions in smoking initiation compared with no programme, although overall effect sizes are small and study quality is mixed. Although, when these curricula are combined with some other anti-smoking method, specifically media or smoke-free policies, then these curricula demonstrate slight efficacy. A systematic review of the National Cancer Institute's (NCI) Research-Tested Intervention Programs revealed that targeting specific high-risk demographic groups, and utilizing mental-health professional and community members, is one way to improve the overall efficacy of these prevention programs. While there are many components that contribute to developing an effective anti-smoking campaign, an effective strategy may be to take advantage of components of various other anti-smoking campaigns.

One of the major anti-smoking campaigns in existence is the Truth campaign. The age demographic this campaign targets are adolescents between the ages of twelve and seventeen. The primary method through which the Truth campaign works is to attract adolescents via eye-catching television advertisements. The Truth campaign makes use of the mass-media communication strategy known as counter-marketing which previous research has shown to be an effective method of reducing smoking prevalence among youth. A primary selling point of the Truth campaign is how it is now synonymous to that of a brand. Alongside media campaigns, some schools have implemented structured cessation and education programmes as alternatives to punitive responses when students violate tobacco-free school policies. In place of automatic suspension or citation, these approaches may refer students to in-person or online quit-support courses and evidence-informed curricula, such as programmes designed specifically for adolescents who use cigarettes, e-cigarettes, or other nicotine products. Early implementation reports describe these 'alternative-to-suspension' models as a way to maintain tobacco-free norms while providing support for quitting, although formal evaluations of their long-term effectiveness remain limited. Adolescents can view brands as a form of self-expression and thus feel a sense of connection to the Truth campaign.

In addition to industry-funded campaigns, several government-sponsored media campaigns have sought to prevent youth tobacco use. In 2014, the U.S. FDA launched "The Real Cost" campaign which uses television, digital and social media advertising to communicate the health consequences of tobacco use to adolescents. Analyses of the 2021 NYTS found that roughly three-quarters of U.S. middle and high school students reported seeing at least one anti-tobacco campaign in the past 12 months, and about 61% recognized at least one "The Real Cost" advertisement, with awareness generally higher among high school than middle school students.

== Regulation and Statistics by country ==
=== Angola ===
In Angola, the Global Youth Tobacco Survey (GYTS) in Huambo, conducted in 2010 with 735 students aged 13 to 15, found that 19.8% currently use any tobacco product, 2.3% currently smoke cigarettes, and 13.7% have experimented with cigarettes throughout their lives; The survey also pointed to significant exposure to pro-tobacco advertising and passive smoking.

=== Brazil ===
In Brazil, cigarette consumption among students remained relatively stable between 2015 and 2019, going from 6.6% to 6.8%, but the use of any tobacco product increased in the same period, from 10.6% to 14.8%. In 2019, approximately 1 million Brazilians were current users of e-cigarettes, and 70% of them were between 15 and 24 years old. More recent surveys have also pointed to an expansion in the use of vapes among teenagers. LENAD III found that 11.4% of teenagers had already tried electronic cigarettes and that 76.3% of those who tried them continued to use them; among adults in the capitals of the states, the prevalence of electronic cigarette use was 2.1%.

Demographic factors associated with smoking among adolescents also vary according to age, family context, and social condition. In the national ERICA survey, adolescents aged 15 to 17 years showed higher prevalences of experimentation, current use, and frequent use than those aged 12 to 14 years; in the sample as a whole, the prevalences did not differ significantly between sexes, but were higher in Southern Brazil and lower in Northeastern Brazil, in addition to being higher among those who had paid work, lived with only one parent, and reported contact with smokers inside or outside the home. In smaller Brazilian studies, smoking in adolescence also appeared associated with parental smoking, school dropout and academic delay, and, in some segments, a higher likelihood of use among girls and among young people of lower socioeconomic status.

The minimum age to purchase tobacco products is 18 years. Advertising and promotion of tobacco are prohibited, with a limited exception for the display of products at the point of sale, and packaging must include mandatory health warnings. In 2024, Anvisa maintained the ban on the sale, import, and advertising of electronic cigarettes.

In Brazil, the media continues to be a significant vector for exposure to tobacco. A study on popular films shown in the country concluded that the Brazilian advisory rating system tends to assign lower age ratings to works with a greater presence of smoking images, including titles released for teenagers, which increases youth exposure to smoking. Furthermore, a 2024 survey on Instagram and Facebook identified 5,941 URLs advertising tobacco and nicotine products, concentrated mainly on Instagram, despite the legal prohibition of such advertising on the internet; the study also observed content focused on sales, product demonstrations, instructions for use, and associations with artists, films, and elements appealing to young people.

Smoking prevention programs in schools have shown mixed results. In a randomized trial with 2,348 adolescents from public schools, the "Education Against Tobacco" program reduced the increase in smoking prevalence compared to the control group over 12 months, with a more evident effect among boys and students with low academic performance. In contrast, a previous educational intervention by the National Cancer Institute did not alter the prevalence of smoking at the end of the study, although it improved knowledge about passive smoking, suggesting that effectiveness depends on the design, implementation, and target audience of the preventive action.

=== Cape Verde ===
In Cape Verde, the 2007 national GYTS survey showed that 13.4% of students aged 13 to 15 used some type of tobacco product and 3.5% smoked cigarettes at the time of the survey; the survey also indicated that 15.3% of non-smokers were likely to start smoking in the following year.

=== Denmark ===
In November 2023, Denmark reached a cross-party political agreement on a "prevention plan" containing 30 initiatives. Together, the initiatives are intended to help reduce children's and young people's consumption of tobacco, nicotine and alcohol and to support more inclusive communities. Nearly DKK 500 million was allocated for implementing the 30 initiatives.

In addition to smoking, Denmark has also introduced stricter measures for other nicotine products, including nicotine pouches ("tobacco surrogates") and smoke-free tobacco (including chewing tobacco).The tax on smoke-free nicotine products was raised from 5.5 to 10 øre per milligram of nicotine, described as resulting in an average price increase of around DKK 12 (€1.6) for a can of nicotine pouches. The legislative proposal also regulates tobacco surrogates through product rules on flavour/aroma (with tobacco or menthol as the exception), rules on nicotine content, and standardisation requirements such as packaging standardisation. Penalties for violating rules related to tobacco and nicotine products were raised, with fines starting at DKK 50,000.

From 1 October 2024, online purchases of nicotine, tobacco, e-cigarette and alcohol products require age verification, and the method can vary from webshop to webshop. The announcement describes verification via MitID or by using valid photo identification (such as a passport or driving licence) as examples of effective online age control under the new requirement, and links the measure to the government's prevention plan aimed at children's and young people's nicotine, tobacco and alcohol consumption. Retailers are permitted to require the verification method of their choice.

=== England ===
In England, survey data show a long-term decline in cigarette smoking among secondary school pupils. In 2021, 12% of pupils aged 11 to 15 years had ever smoked, including 3% who were current smokers (1% regular and 2% occasional). These figures continue a downward trend since the 1990s in both ever-smoking and current smoking among school-aged children.

=== Guinea-Bissau ===
In Guinea-Bissau, a 2017 survey of 2,039 adolescents aged 14 to 19, distributed across 16 schools, found that 14.8% had experimented with cigarettes at some point in their lives, 4.0% were occasional smokers, and 2.4% were daily smokers; Among the main predictors were having smoking friends, being a boy, studying at a private school, and starting smoking at an earlier age.

=== Equatorial Guinea ===
In Equatorial Guinea, the 2008 GYTS survey indicated that over 20% of students used some form of tobacco, 7.0% smoked cigarettes, and 17.8% used other tobacco products; the study was also designed to monitor media exposure, access to tobacco products, and school content about tobacco.

=== Morocco ===
According to a 2024 report shared by Morocco's Ministry of Education, smoking rates among those aged 13 to 15 have escalated to 6%.

=== Mozambique ===
In Mozambique, the national GYTS survey of 2013, with 3,062 students aged 13 to 15, recorded 9.1% current use of any tobacco product, 6.1% current smoking, and 2.3% current cigarette smoking; The survey also pointed to high exposure to secondhand smoke at home and in enclosed public spaces.

=== Portugal ===
In Portugal, a representative survey of regular schoolchildren showed 9.6% regular smokers and 2.9% occasional smokers, with consumption increasing with age and varying by region. More recently, the ESPAD (European School Survey Project on Alcohol and Other Drugs) 2024 placed Portugal among the countries with the lowest use of electronic cigarettes, with 22% lifetime use and 6.4% use in the last 30 days.

=== São Tomé and Príncipe ===
In São Tomé and Príncipe, the 2010 GYTS survey found that 26.2% of students aged 13 to 15 currently used any tobacco product, 4.4% currently smoked cigarettes, and 25.6% currently used other tobacco products; The study also showed high exposure to secondhand smoke at home and in enclosed public spaces.

=== Timor-Leste ===
In Timor-Leste, the 2019 national GYTS survey found that 30.9% of students aged 13 to 15 currently use any tobacco product, with 22.5% currently smoking cigarettes and 20.4% currently smoking cigarettes; Exposure to secondhand smoke was very high both at home and in enclosed public spaces. A subsequent study in Dili, with 1,121 students aged 13 to 15, found 40.4% experimenting and 32.2% using tobacco.

== See also ==
- Cigarette smoking among college students
- Plain tobacco packaging
