= Kathleen DeBold =

American LGBTQ activist and advocate, and beekeeper

Kathleen Joan DeBold
- Born: November 21, 1955; Brooklyn, New York, U.S.
- Died: October 9, 2022 (aged 66); Ocean City, Maryland, U.S.
- Education: University of Maryland
- Known for: LGBTQ activist, writer, entomologist, Peace Corps volunteer
- Partner: Barbara G. Johnson

Kathleen Joan DeBold (November 16, 1955 – October 9, 2022) was an LGBTQ activist and advocate. The Washington Blade named her "Most Committed Female Activist" (2001) as well as a "Local Hero" (2005).

In 2015, DeBold was named a Community Pioneer by Washington D.C.'s Rainbow History Project. At that time, she was the national administrator for the Lambda Literary Awards, a position she had held since 2012.

DeBold was an early advocate for the specific health needs of lesbian patients, women who might avoid regular checkups because of fear of discrimination or awkwardness about being "out" to their health care providers. She was the executive director of the Mautner Project for Lesbians with Cancer from 1999 through 2007. While at the Mautner Project, she developed many bisexual- and lesbian-specific health programs including Delicious Lesbian Kisses, an anti-smoking campaign. Prior to marriage equality in the United States, it was important that lesbians in long-term relationships understood their legal rights if their partner was seriously ill; DeBold, through her work with the Mautner Project, advocated for lesbian-specific support groups for partners of people with cancer. She organized Healing Works, a national conference about lesbians and cancer in 2000 which focused on creating a "future agenda for lesbian cancer research and support services." During her time at Mautner, she facilitated the publication of Coming Out of Cancer: Writings from the Lesbian Cancer Epidemic, edited by Victoria A. Brownworth and published by Seal Press. DeBold also spearheaded research including the Spirit Health Study, a national survey of black lesbian and bisexual women's health.

Prior to the Mautner Project, through her work as deputy director of the Gay & Lesbian Victory Fund in the 1990s, DeBold also campaigned for many LGBTQ candidates—including D.C. Councilmembers David Catania and Jim Graham, U.S. representative (now senator) from Wisconsin Tammy Baldwin—and wrote the book Out for Office: Campaigning in the Gay Nineties. Her other book, Word Gaymes, is a compilation of crossword puzzles and acrostics published in the Washington Blade and other LGBTQ news publications around the country. After the Mautner Project, she was the interim executive director of the Servicemembers Legal Defense Network (SLDN), where she fought for the repeal of the Don’t Ask, Don’t Tell policy.

== Personal life ==
DeBold was born in Brooklyn, New York. Her family moved to Rockville, Maryland, where she graduated from R.E. Peary High School in 1973. She attended Flagler College in St. Augustine, Florida, where she met her life partner, Barbara Johnson (who went on to become an author with Naiad Press and Bella Books). She transferred to the University of Maryland, where she received a B.S. in Agriculture and Life Sciences in 1977, after which she worked for the Entomological Society of America. She became Maryland's first female apiary inspector in 1978. She volunteered for the Peace Corps in 1982, being assigned to the Central African Republic (CAR), where she taught beekeeping and helped the people of the CAR create honey and beeswax markets. She wrote about her experience for the journal Bee World in 1996. After two stints in the Peace Corps, she remained in the CAR working with Africare, a DC-based non-profit that addresses food security and agriculture, health and HIV/AIDS, water and sanitation, and emergency and humanitarian aid in Africa. She was with her longtime companion, Barbara, for 48 years before her death. They were legally married in Maryland in 2013.They lived in Burtonsville, Maryland.
