= TWINT =

Payment system for cashless payment

Twint AG
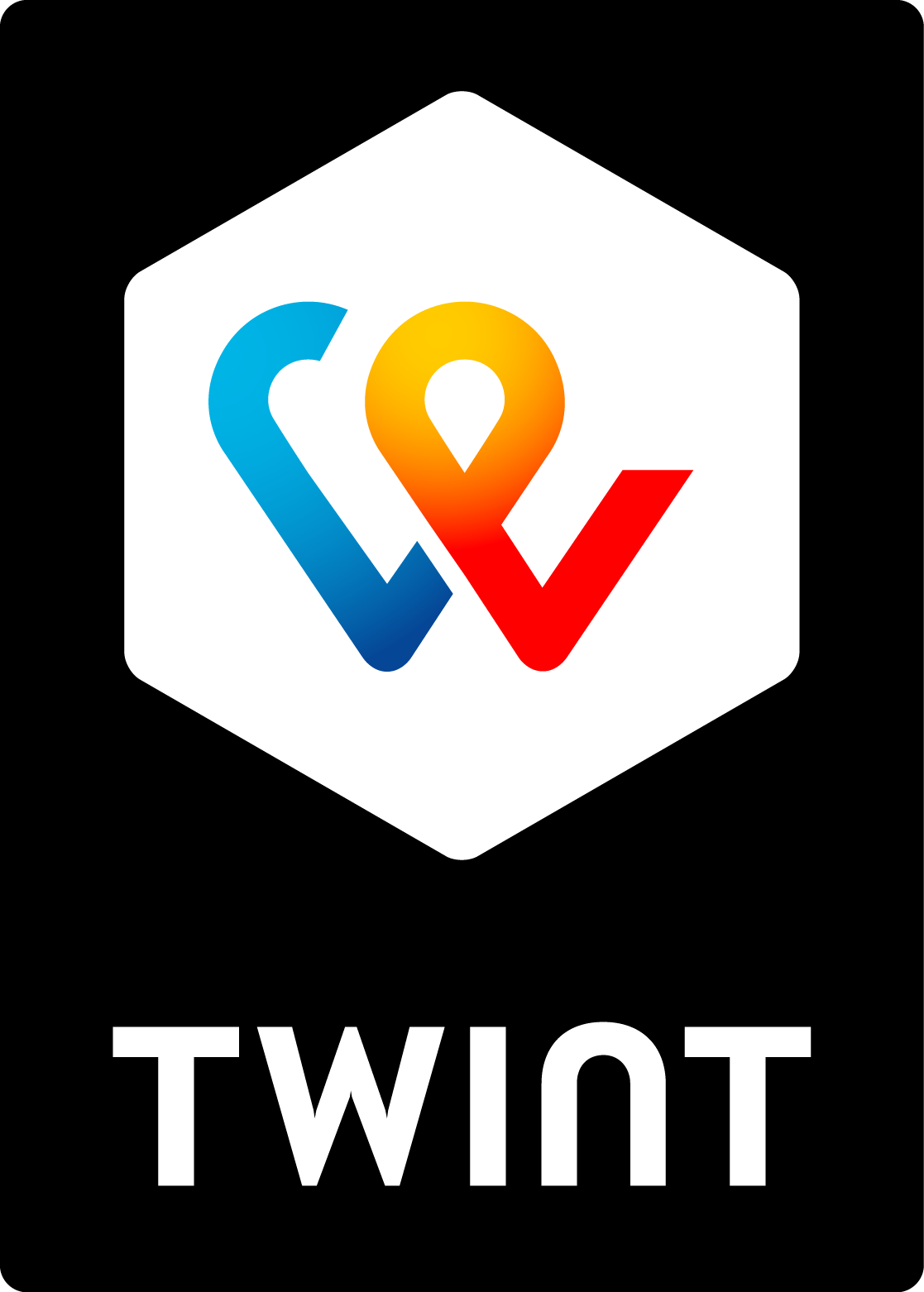
- Company type: Joint-stock company
- Predecessor: Monexio AG
- Founded: July 2014; 11 years ago in Bern, Switzerland
- Headquarters: Zurich, Switzerland
- Key people: Markus Kilb (CEO)
- Services: Mobile payment
- Website: twint.ch

Twint is a Swiss mobile payment system rolled out nation-wide in 2017. As of 2024, Twint has become ubiquitous in Switzerland, with many stores accepting Twint payments and nearly all banks taking part in the payment system. The app was developed by Monexio, a wholly owned subsidiary of PostFinance, beginning in 2014.

The first banks that cooperated in Twint were the Berner Kantonalbank and Valiant Bank in 2015, joined by the Basler Kantonalbank and Bank Cler in 2016.

Twint had approximately five million users in 2023.

== Company ==
=== History ===
Twint was created by Monexio AG, a company founded in July 2014 as a wholly owned subsidiary of PostFinance. PostFinance Executive Board member Thierry Kneissler was appointed CEO, while Hansruedi Köng, CEO of PostFinance, became Chairman of the Board of Directors. The company became operational in August 2014. The pre-launch of Twint took place from 6 August 2015, starting in the cities of Bern and Zurich. The national rollout began on 3 November 2015.

In May 2016, Twint and Paymit, a competitor made by the Zurich Cantonal Bank and the SIX Group, announced a fusion, which was approved by the Competition Commission of Switzerland in September 2016.

== Services ==
Each Twint account is connected to a mobile phone number, a bank account, or both.

=== Payments to other Twint users ===
When making a payment to a private Twint user, the payer selects the receiver's contact in the app, and specifies the sum. A receiver can also request a sum from a mobile phone contact if that person is also using the Twint app.

=== Payment in stores ===
Payment when making purchases can happen in two ways:

- The credit card terminal's display shows an instantly generated QR code that contains both the recipient's account, and the amount to be paid. With the phone's camera, the app scans the QR code, and then asks the payer for confirmation.
- The store owner can display a sheet of paper on which a static QR code is printed. In that case, the QR code only specifies the recipient's account, and the payer has to enter the sum on his mobile phone. After successful payment, the payer then shows his phone display to the vendor, where the app displays the sum and the receiver's identity.

Specifically the latter method has allowed many small stores to be integrated into cashless money transfer, e.g. mountain huts, club restaurants at sports matches, and second-hand shops, without having to invest in credit card terminals.

== Criticism ==
While transactions between individuals are free of charge, the fees charged to retailers for Twint payments are considered high (typically 1.3%). The Swiss Retail Federation has filed a complaint against Twint for abuse of a dominant position with the Competition Commission.

== See also ==
- Bizum
- Swish (payment)
