= Marc Wieser =

Swiss ice hockey player

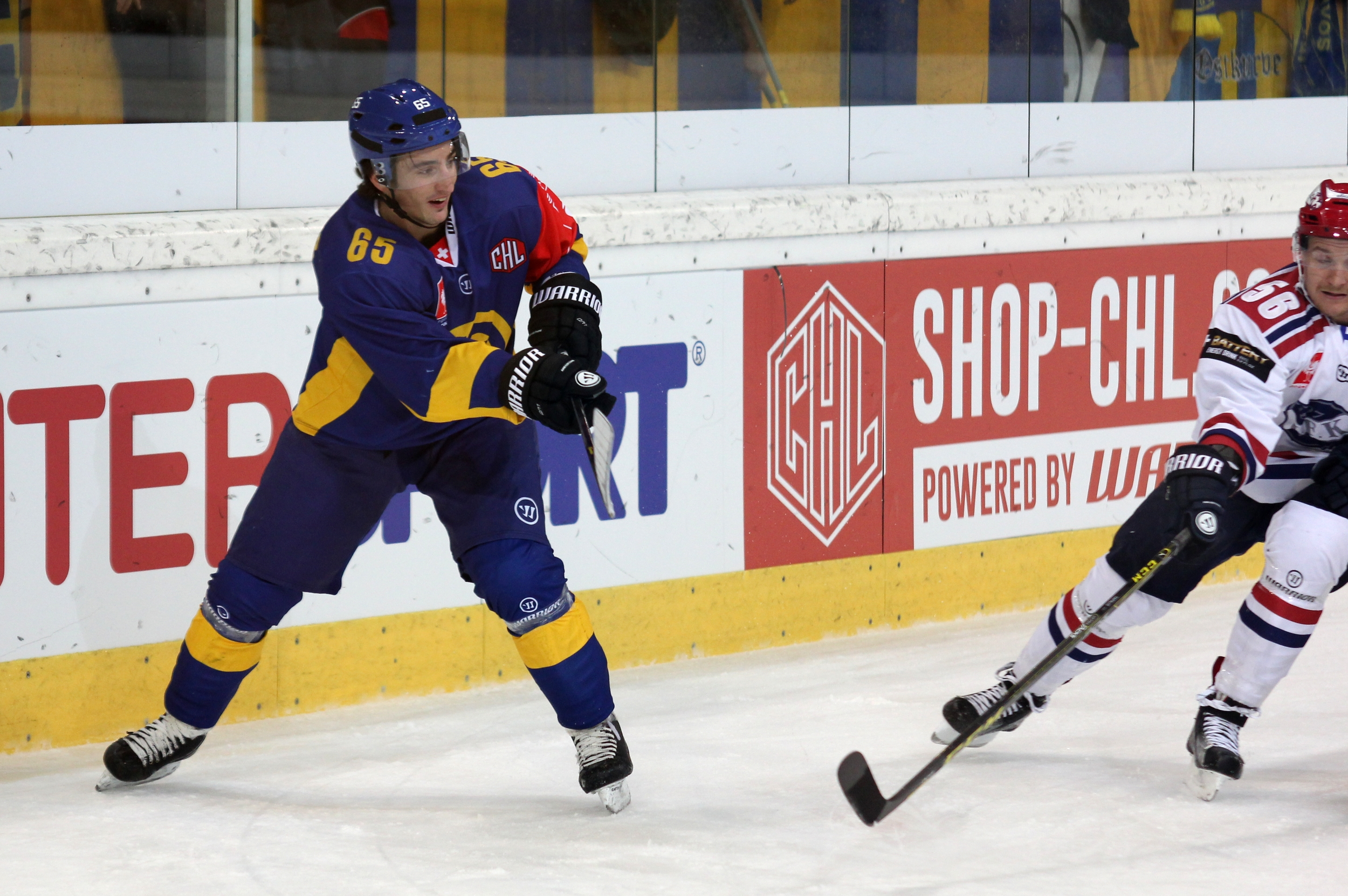
- Born: 13 October 1987 (age 38) Küblis, Switzerland
- Height: 5 ft 11 in (180 cm)
- Weight: 183 lb (83 kg; 13 st 1 lb)
- Position: Right wing
- Shot: Right
- Played for: HC Davos; EHC St. Moritz; EHC Visp; SC Langenthal; HC Sierre; EHC Biel
- National team: Switzerland
- Playing career: 2006–2025

Marc Wieser (born 13 October 1987) is a Swiss professional ice hockey right wing who is currently playing for HC Davos of the National League (NL).

His brother Dino Wieser is also plays alongside him professionally with HC Davos.

== Career statistics ==
			Regular season					Playoffs
Season	Team	League	GP	G	A	Pts	PIM	GP	G	A	Pts	PIM
2001–02	HC Davos U17	Novizen Elite	—	—	—	—	—	—	—	—	—	—
2002–03	HC Davos U17	Novizen Elite	—	—	—	—	—	—	—	—	—	—
2003–04	HC Davos U20	Elite Jr. A	1	0	0	0	2	—	—	—	—	—
2003–04	EHC St. Moritz U20	Elite Jr. B	—	—	—	—	—	—	—	—	—	—
2004–05	HC Davos U20	Elite Jr. A	37	8	5	13	63	4	0	1	1	8
2005–06	HC Davos U20	Elite Jr. A	43	21	19	40	145	—	—	—	—	—
2005–06	HC Davos	NLA	3	0	0	0	2	—	—	—	—	—
2005–06	EHC St. Moritz	SwissDiv1	2	0	0	0	2	2	1	0	1	0
2006–07	HC Davos U20	Elite Jr. A	38	35	24	59	165	3	3	1	4	4
2006–07	HC Davos	NLA	—	—	—	—	—	14	0	2	2	8
2006–07	EHC Visp	NLB	4	0	0	0	0	—	—	—	—	—
2007–08	HC Davos	NLA	43	3	7	10	26	9	0	1	1	22
2008–09	HC Davos	NLA	34	6	2	8	16	16	1	1	2	10
2008–09	SC Langenthal	NLB	10	2	2	4	35	—	—	—	—	—
2009–10	HC Davos	NLA	48	3	6	9	85	6	0	0	0	4
2010–11	HC Davos	NLA	49	4	4	8	28	14	3	1	4	24
2010–11	HC Sierre	NLB	4	0	2	2	25	—	—	—	—	—
2011–12	EHC Biel-Bienne	NLA	46	9	11	20	47	3	0	2	2	16
2012–13	EHC Biel-Bienne	NLA	50	13	13	26	16	7	2	1	3	8
2013–14	EHC Biel-Bienne	NLA	47	13	8	21	28	—	—	—	—	—
2014–15	HC Davos	NLA	47	16	17	33	82	12	3	4	7	8
2015–16	HC Davos	NLA	50	24	25	49	20	9	4	4	8	12
2016–17	HC Davos	NLA	50	21	16	37	36	10	3	6	9	10
2017–18	HC Davos	NL	50	14	22	36	44	6	1	2	3	4
2018–19	HC Davos	NL	47	10	9	19	88	—	—	—	—	—
2019–20	HC Davos	NL	41	13	11	24	18	—	—	—	—	—
2020–21	HC Davos	NL	50	16	14	30	18	2	1	0	1	0
2021–22	HC Davos	NL	46	5	5	10	41	11	0	3	3	4
2022–23	HC Davos	NL	52	13	14	27	14	5	2	0	2	0
2023–24	HC Davos	NL	49	7	11	18	16	6	1	1	2	2
2024–25	HC Davos	NL	42	0	1	1	4	10	0	2	2	8
NL/NLA totals			844	190	196	386	629	140	21	30	51	140
