= List of presidents of the Executive Council of Basel-Stadt =

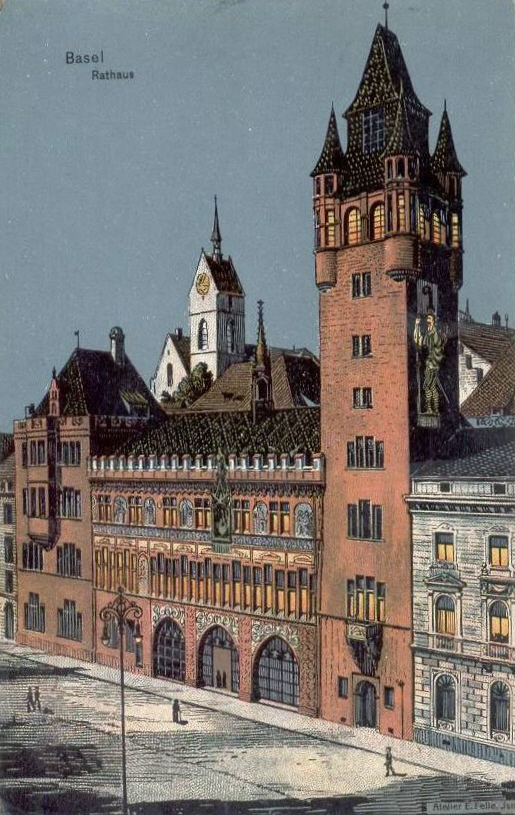
Rathaus Basel

Christoph Eymann, President of the council for the year 2003/2004

Coat of arms of Basel

This is a list of presidents of the Executive Council of the canton of Basel-Stadt. The canton of Basel-Stadt and city of Basel are governed by a seven-member executive council (Regierungsrat). The executive council is chaired by its president (Regierungspräsident). The function used to rotate annually among the members, but has become a permanent role in 2009. The city of Basel doesn't have a government of its own or a mayor.

President of the Executive Council of Basel-Stadt
Term	Mayor	Lifespan	Party	Notes
1997/1998	Ueli Vischer	(born 1951)		
1998/1999	Veronica Schaller	(born 1955)		
1999/2000	Hans Martin Tschudi	(born 1951)		
2000/2001	Ralph Lewin	(born 1953)		
2001/2002	Barbara Schneider	(born 1953)		
2002/2003	Carlo Conti	(born 1954)		
2003/2004	Christoph Eymann	(born 1951)		
2004/2005	Jörg Schild	(born 1946)		
2005/2006	Ralph Lewin	(born 1953)		
2006/2007	Barbara Schneider	(born 1953)		
2007/2008	Eva Herzog	(born 1961)		
2008–present	Guy Morin	(born 1956)		
