= Ralph Lewin =

Swiss politician

Ralph Lewin (born May 21, 1953) is a Swiss politician and a former member of the Government Council of the Canton of Basel-City from 1997 to 2008. From 2010 to 2017, Lewin served on the board of directors for Bank Coop (today called Bank Cler) and in the Bank Council of its majority owner Basler Kantonalbank. He is a member of the Social Democratic Party of Switzerland. Since 2020 he is president of the Swiss Federation of Jewish Communities.

== Career ==
Lewin graduated from the University of Basel in 1977 with a degree in Sociology and Macroeconomics. In 1984 Lewin began a two-year run as a member of the Swiss delegation to the OECD in Paris.

Lewin was the Governing Councilor and Chairman of the Department of Economic and Social Affairs of Basel-City Canton from 1997 to 2009. Lewin became the President of the Cantonal Executive of the Canton of Basel-City for several years. In that span, Lewin was a MCH Messe Schweiz AG board member and a Basel-City Transport Authority member (chairman from 1997 through 2005).

In 2009 Lewin became the President of the Foundation Board of the Sympany Insurance Group. Three months later, Lewin became President of the Swiss Association of Shipping and Port Industrie.

Lewin was on the board of directors for Banque Coop SA until 2017. He also served on the board of directors for Basler Kantonalbank (BSKP.S).
