= John Tavares =

Canadian ice hockey player (born 1990)

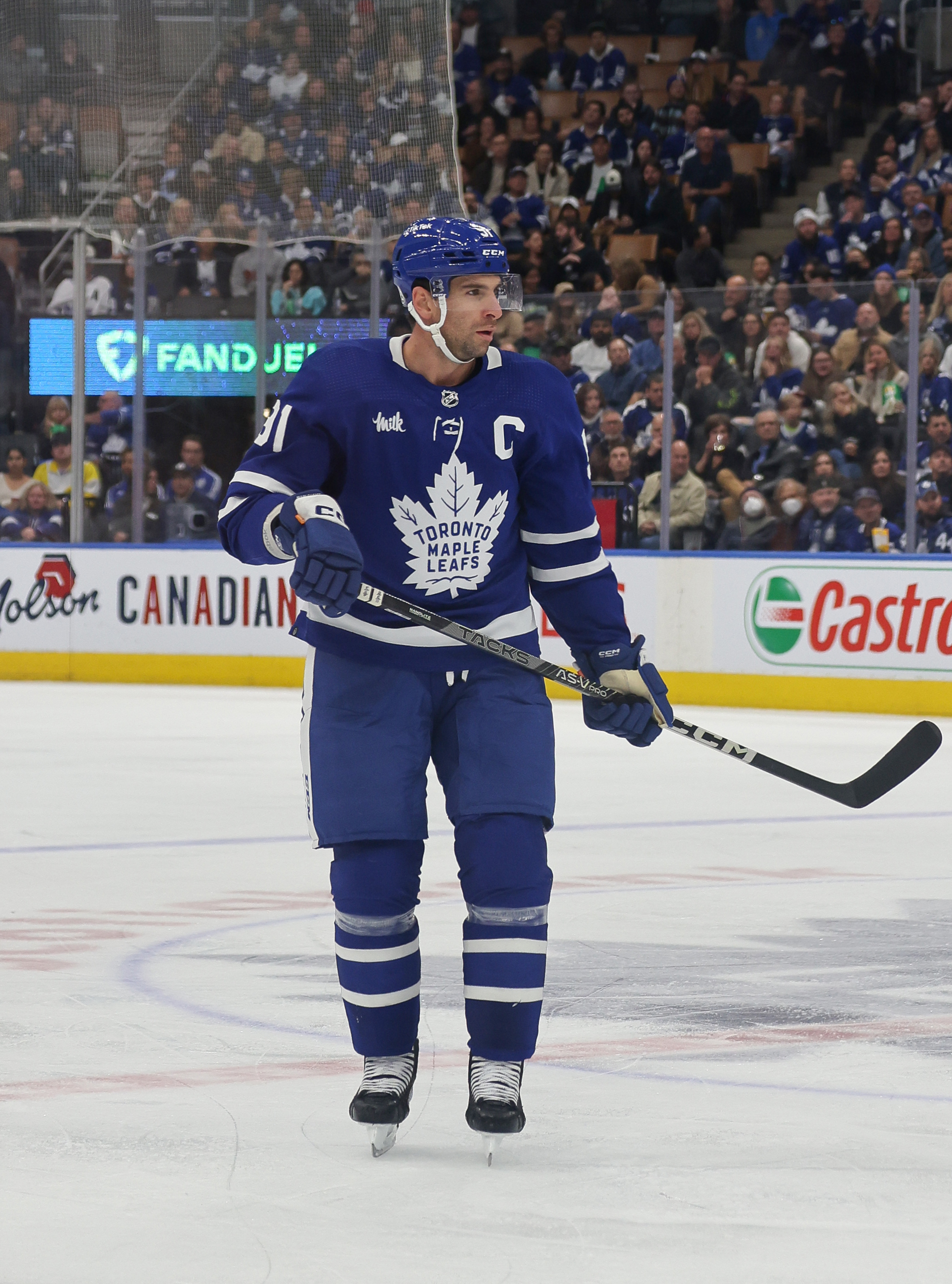
- Tavares with the Toronto Maple Leafs in October 2022
- Born: September 20, 1990 (age 36) Mississauga, Ontario, Canada
- Height: 6 ft 1 in (185 cm)
- Weight: 216 lb (98 kg; 15 st 6 lb)
- Position: Forward
- Shoots: Left
- NHL team Former teams: Toronto Maple Leafs; New York Islanders; SC Bern
- National team: Canada
- NHL draft: 1st overall, 2009; New York Islanders
- Playing career: 2009–present

John Tavares (born September 20, 1990) is a Canadian professional ice hockey player who is a forward and alternate captain for the Toronto Maple Leafs of the National Hockey League (NHL). In the 2009 NHL entry draft, he was selected first overall by the New York Islanders, for whom he played nine seasons and served as captain for five seasons. He also served as the captain of the Maple Leafs from 2019 through 2024.

Previously, Tavares competed at the major junior level as a member of the Oshawa Generals of the Ontario Hockey League (OHL) before being traded to the London Knights at the 2009 OHL trading deadline along with Michael Del Zotto. Tavares broke into the OHL after gaining exceptional player status at age 14, allowing the Generals to select him in the OHL Priority Draft as an underage player in 2005. Tavares was named the Canadian Hockey League (CHL) Rookie of the Year in 2006 and CHL Player of the Year in 2007. Tavares finished his Major Junior and OHL career with most goals (215), and 6th in points (433).

Tavares was the focus of an unsuccessful push to have the NHL's draft rules changed to allow him to participate in the 2008 entry draft, as well as an attempt to allow him to play in the American Hockey League (AHL) as a 17-year-old in 2007. Tavares was ranked as the top prospect for the 2009 Draft by both the NHL Central Scouting Bureau and International Scouting Services.

Tavares has represented Canada at five International Ice Hockey Federation (IIHF)-sanctioned events, including the 2010 and 2011 World Championships. At the under-20 level, he won gold medals at the 2008 and 2009 World Junior Ice Hockey Championships. He was named the most valuable player of the 2009 tournament after scoring eight goals and 15 points in six games. He also participated in the 2006 IIHF World U18 Championships, but failed to medal. Additionally, Tavares represented Team Ontario at the 2006 World U-17 Hockey Challenge and 2007 Super Series. On January 7, 2014, he was named to the 2014 Canadian Olympic Hockey Team, winning a gold medal at the 2014 Winter Olympics despite an injury preventing him from participating in the final two games.

== Early career ==
Tavares was born on September 20, 1990, in Mississauga, Ontario, to Barbara and Joe Tavares, who are of Polish and Portuguese descent, respectively. His maternal grandparents, Bolesław and Josephine Kowal, immigrated from Poland to Sudbury, Ontario, and his paternal grandparents Manuel and Dorotea Tavares immigrated from Portugal to Toronto, Ontario. At a very young age, Tavares' family which included his sister, moved to Oakville, Ontario. This is where he was first exposed to minor hockey through the Minor Oaks Hockey Association. Tavares also played soccer and lacrosse, and his highly competitive nature often led him to fight with other players. Tavares excelled at lacrosse, following in the footsteps of his uncle John Tavares, the all-time scoring leader in the National Lacrosse League (NLL), and was a ball boy for his uncle's NLL team, the Buffalo Bandits. The younger Tavares credits his uncle with teaching him the importance of remaining unselfish, stating what he learned by following his uncle with the Bandits has made him better both as a person and a hockey player. Many skills he learned in lacrosse—such as spinning off checks and battling in traffic—transferred to ice hockey and improved Tavares' abilities as a goal scorer.

In Oakville, Tavares attended St. Thomas Aquinas Catholic Secondary School. He lived five minutes from Sam Gagner, who would go on to play over 1,000 NHL games, and the two quickly established a friendship. Gagner's father, former NHL player Dave Gagner, built a backyard ice rink on which Tavares spent much of his time honing ice hockey skills. In the OHL, Tavares placed an emphasis on his education, earning honours as well as the Oshawa Generals' Scholastic Player of the Year in 2007–08. Tavares also spends some of his time working with the Special Olympics.

Tavares showed such promise as a hockey player that when he was seven, his parents moved him up one age group and he began playing with older children. From there, he moved on to the Mississauga Braves of the Greater Toronto Hockey League (GTHL). After playing the 1998–99 season with the Braves' novice team, Tavares moved to the Mississauga Senators of the GTHL the following season. With the Senators' AAA minor atom team, Tavares won the GTHL minor atom championship in the 1999–2000 season. Tavares eventually moved to the Toronto Marlboros of the GTHL. During the 2003–04 season Tavares was teammates with his friend Sam Gagner, and scored 95 goals and 187 points in 90 games to lead the Marlboros' bantam team to the 2004 Bantam AAA Provincial Hockey Championships, where the Marlboros defeated Drew Doughty and the London Jr. Knights 5–0 in the championship game. Tavares scored one goal in the game and was named the tournament's top forward. The following season, Tavares joined the Marlboros' minor midget team, where he recorded 91 goals and 158 points in 72 games. For his achievements, Tavares shared the Buck Houle Award with Bryan Cameron, "in recognition of outstanding on ice performance, leadership and loyalty". During this season, he also played 16 games with the Milton Icehawks of the Ontario Provincial Junior A Hockey League (OPJHL), during which he recorded 11 goals and 23 points. Tavares' debut with the Icehawks came while he was only 13, making him one of the youngest players to ever play junior hockey.

== Playing career ==
=== Junior ===
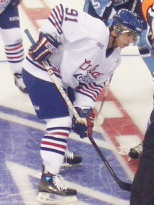
Tavares takes a face-off during the 2006–07 OHL season. During that season he was selected as an OHL representative for the ADT Canada-Russia Challenge.

Tavares petitioned to gain eligibility to play major junior in the Ontario Hockey League (OHL) in the spring of 2005. As OHL rules did not allow for players under age 15 to be drafted, the OHL introduced an exceptional player status clause, allowing the 14-year-old Tavares to be drafted one year sooner than he would otherwise have been eligible. Consequently, Tavares is the youngest player to ever be drafted in the OHL, although Bobby Orr was signed and had played at a younger age. The Canadian Hockey League (CHL), the umbrella organization which governs major junior hockey in Canada, sent a proposal to Hockey Canada recommending that the rule be expanded across junior hockey, which eventually was granted. As of 2024, only eight other players have been granted the same status.

The Oshawa Generals held the first pick in the 2005 draft, and they selected Tavares, earning him the Jack Ferguson Award, which is given to the player picked first overall in the OHL Priority Selection. Tavares played his first OHL game on September 23, 2005, scoring his first OHL goal in a game held just three days after his 15th birthday. He showed he could play in the OHL immediately, scoring ten goals in his first nine games with the Generals, and finished the 2005–06 season with 77 points, including 45 goals. Tavares was named to the OHL's all-rookie team, and won both the Emms Family Award and CHL Rookie of the Year awards as the top first-year player in both the OHL and CHL respectively.

As a 16-year-old in 2006–07, Tavares was selected to represent the OHL for two games in January for the annual ADT Canada-Russia Challenge, including one game in Oshawa. Later that month, on January 25, 2007, Tavares registered a seven-point night in a 9–6 win against the Windsor Spitfires. He scored four goals and three assists, including his 50th goal of the season in his 44th game. Towards the end of the season, on March 16, 2007, Tavares recorded his 70th and 71st goals of the season, breaking Wayne Gretzky's OHL record for most goals by a 16-year-old. He was awarded the Red Tilson Trophy as the most outstanding player in the league, and named the CHL Player of the Year.

Tavares scored 40 goals in 59 games for the Generals during the 2007–08 season, while his 118 points was placed him third in OHL scoring. Tavares led the OHL in scoring until he missed several games to represent the Canada men's national junior ice hockey team at the 2008 World Junior Ice Hockey Championships. As Tavares was participating in the 2009 World Junior Ice Hockey Championships, it was speculated that the Generals were ready to trade him to the London Knights. Tavares' future with the Generals had been questioned since the beginning of the season as the Generals were not expected to seriously contend for the championship, while the Knights were among the league leaders. The deal was made official on January 8, 2009, as Oshawa sent Tavares, Michael Del Zotto and Darryl Borden to the Knights in exchange for Scott Valentine, Christian Thomas, Michael Zador and six draft picks.

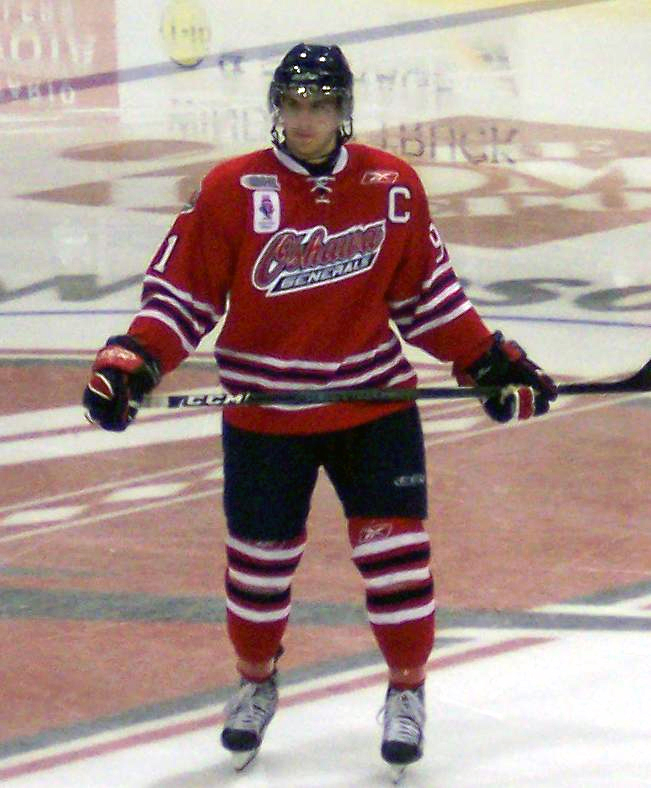
Tavares with Oshawa Generals in November 2008. He was later traded to the London Knights in January 2009.

Tavares made his debut with the Knights on January 11 against the Mississauga St. Michael's Majors. Making his return to Oshawa at the 2009 CHL Top Prospects Game as captain of Team Orr, he recorded an assist in a 6–1 win over Team Cherry, but injured his shoulder after Zack Kassian of the Peterborough Petes checked him behind the net. On March 8, 2009, Tavares set the OHL goal-scoring record with his 214th goal, passing the previous record held by Peter Lee. The next day, he received his third OHL Player of the Week recognition of the season.

=== Professional ===
Although he was born five days after the September 15 cutoff date for eligibility in the 2008 NHL entry draft, there was a significant effort made to allow Tavares into the Draft. Following his 72-goal campaign in 2006–07, Tavares' agents asked the NHL and NHL Players' Association (NHLPA) to make an exception for Tavares similar to the one the OHL had made in 2005. The attempt was unsuccessful and Tavares was required to wait until 2009 to participate in the NHL entry draft. In October 2007, it was reported that then-Toronto Maple Leafs general manager John Ferguson Jr. had offered the 17-year-old Tavares a spot with the team's American Hockey League (AHL) affiliate, the Toronto Marlies. However, like the NHL, the AHL declined to amend its by-laws and Tavares subsequently returned to the OHL.

The NHL International Scouting Services ranked Tavares as the top draft prospect in the world, ahead of defenceman Victor Hedman and forwards Magnus Pääjärvi-Svensson and Matt Duchene in its March 2009 update. The 2009 draft class was led by Tavares, who was selected first overall by the New York Islanders.

==== New York Islanders (2009–2018) ====
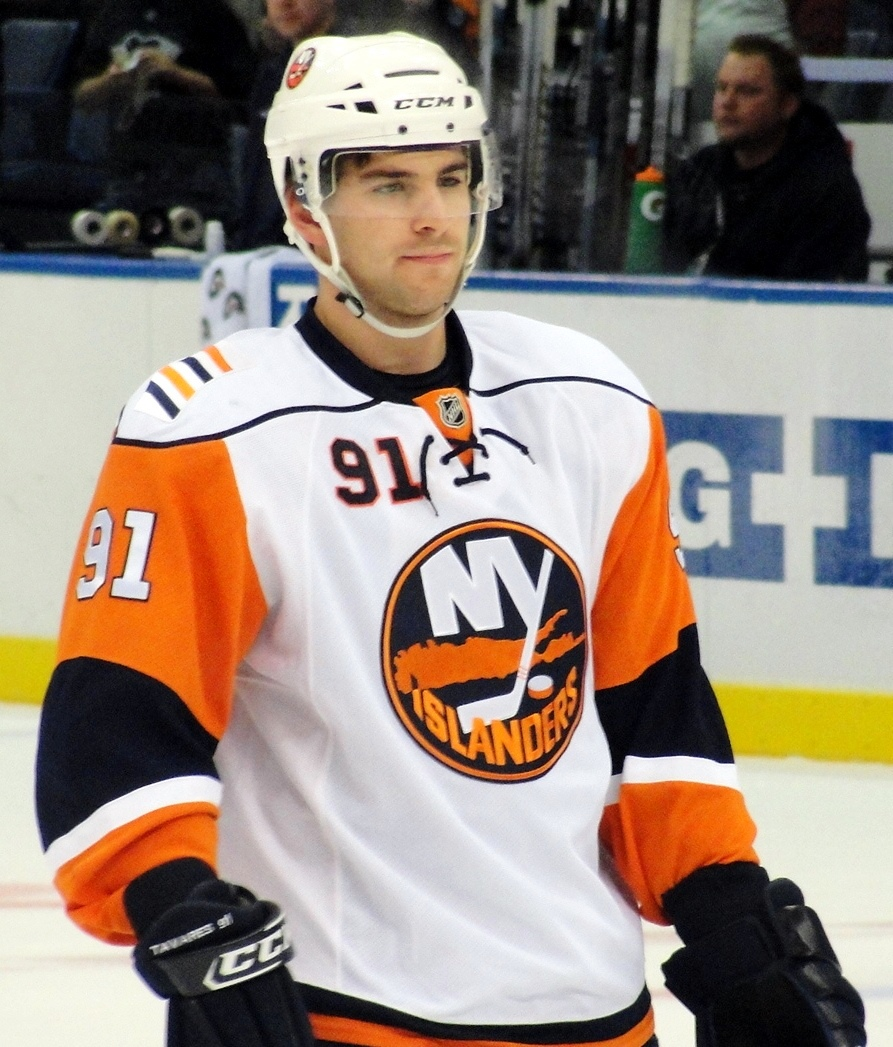
Tavares with the New York Islanders in November 2009. The 2009–10 season was his rookie season in the NHL.

On July 15, 2009, Tavares signed a three-year, entry-level contract with the Islanders. His first NHL game was in the pre-season in a game against the Edmonton Oilers. He spent 22 minutes and 50 seconds on the ice alongside linemates Doug Weight and Sean Bergenheim in the Islanders' 3–2 loss. Weight, a veteran NHLer, said, "John's going to be a big piece of [an Islander rebuilding effort]." Tavares scored his first career NHL goal and assist in his first ever professional game, scoring on a backhander against Marc-André Fleury of the Pittsburgh Penguins on October 3, 2009. Tavares led NHL rookies in scoring throughout much of his first season. In December 2009, he scored five consecutive Islanders goals over a four-game span to tie the club record for most consecutive goals by one player. He scored an empty-net goal against the Atlanta Thrashers on December 3, 2009, and both Islanders goals on both December 9, 2009, against the Philadelphia Flyers and December 10, against his hometown team, the Toronto Maple Leafs. The record was originally set by Bryan Trottier, when he scored five consecutive goals in a 1982 game against the Philadelphia Flyers. On March 17, 2010, Tavares scored five points (two goals and three assists) in a 5–2 win over the Vancouver Canucks. At the end of the season, Tavares finished second in rookie scoring, behind Colorado Avalanche forward Matt Duchene, with 54 points (24 goals, 30 assists) in all 82 games played.

As New York opened up their season at home against the Dallas Stars on October 9, 2010, Tavares suffered a mild concussion late during the first period. The Stars' Adam Burish bumped into Tavares, and the latter was unable to return to the game. He scored his first career hat-trick on October 23, in a 4-3 loss to the Florida Panthers. He then scored his second career NHL hat-trick, as well as his first career natural hat-trick, on January 15, 2011, in a 5-3 win against the Buffalo Sabres.

On September 14, 2011, Tavares signed a new six-year, $33 million contract with the Islanders effective from the 2012–13 season through to the end of the 2017–18 season. After being held pointless in the first two games of the 2011–12 season, Tavares had back-to-back four-point games against the Tampa Bay Lightning and New York Rangers, respectively. From December 29, 2011, to January 21, 2012, Tavares had 21 points in a 12-game point streak, seven of which were multi-point games. He was selected to play in the 2012 NHL All-Star Game. In his first career All-Star Game, he recorded one goal and one assist. Additionally, during the 2011–12 season, Tavares was named as an alternate captain for New York.

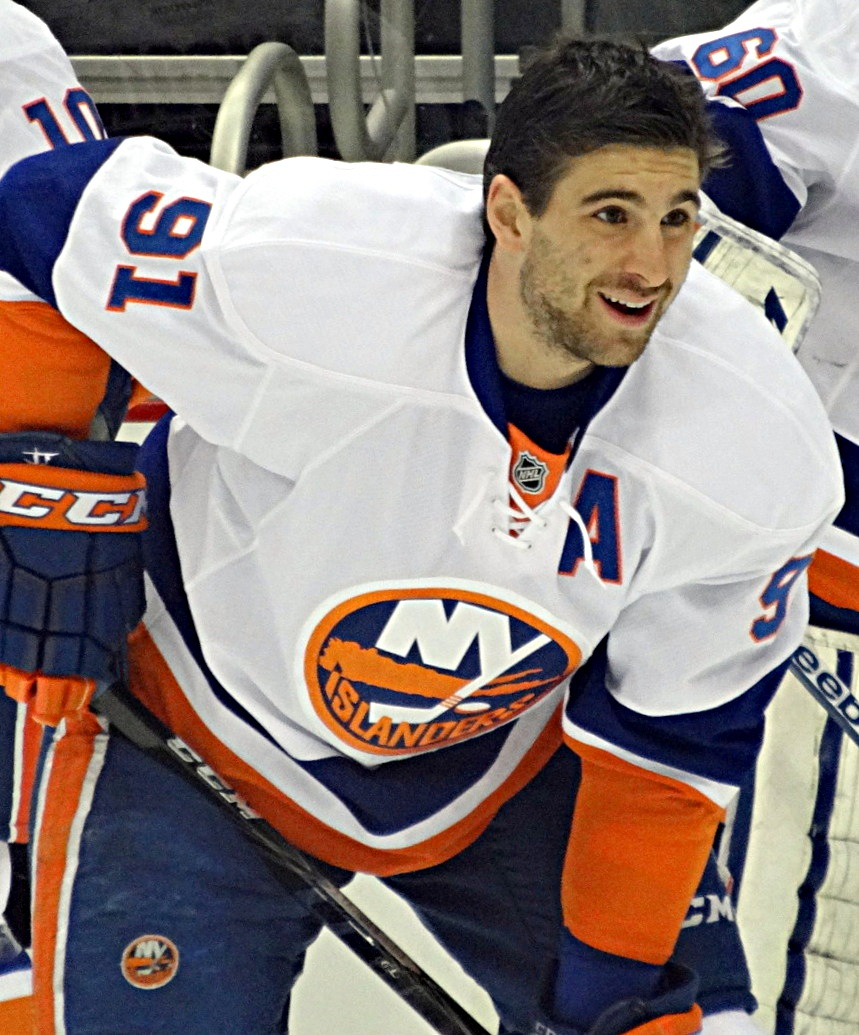
Tavares in May 2013 during the 2013 Stanley Cup playoffs

Tavares played with Mark Streit in Switzerland for SC Bern while the 2012–13 NHL lock-out took place. During the shortened 2012–13 season, Tavares was third in the NHL with 28 goals (Only behind Washington Capitals forward and captain Alexander Ovechkin, who had 32 as the league leader and Tampa Bay Lightning forward Steven Stamkos, who had 29, respectively. He helped the Islanders reach the Stanley Cup playoffs for the first time since 2007 after the Islanders finished the season narrowly qualifying as the eighth and final seed in the Eastern Conference with Tavares scoring 47 points (28 goals, 19 assists) in all 48 games played. Tavares was also named a finalist for the Hart Memorial Trophy, awarded to the NHL's most valuable player in the regular season, which was eventually awarded to Alexander Ovechkin of the Washington Capitals. He made his playoff debut on May 1, 2013, against the Pittsburgh Penguins. Tavares scored his first career Stanley Cup playoff goal against Pittsburgh goaltender Marc-André Fleury in Game 3 of the 2013 playoffs. He would finish with three goals, two assists and five points in all six games as the Islanders were eliminated in six games by the top-seeded Penguins.

On September 9, 2013, Tavares was named as the 14th captain in New York Islanders history, replacing former Islander Mark Streit of the Philadelphia Flyers, who served as team captain since 2011. On February 19, 2014, during the 2014 Winter Olympics, Tavares suffered a torn medial collateral ligament (MCL) and a torn meniscus in his knee during the quarterfinal game against Latvia, forcing him to miss the remainder of the Olympics as well as the remainder of the 2013–14 season. At the time of his injury, Tavares ranked third in the NHL with 24 goals, 42 assists and 66 points in 59 games.

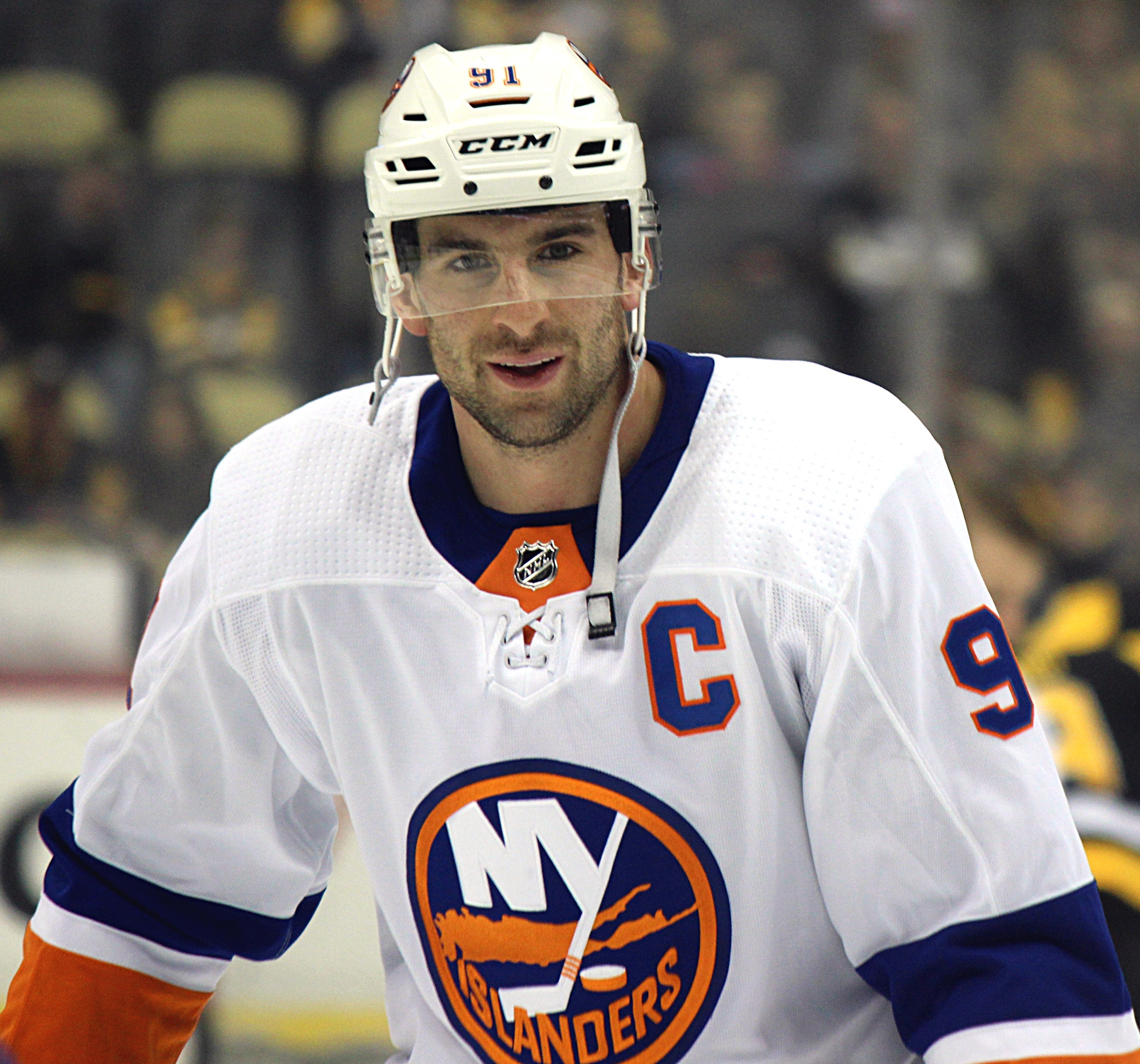
Tavares in March 2018. The 2017–18 season was his last season with the Islanders.

Half way into the 2014–15 season, he was selected for the 2015 NHL All-Star Game, along with teammate Jaroslav Halák. Tavares finished the 2014–15 season as runner up for the Art Ross Trophy with 86 points (38 goals, 48 assists) in all 82 games played, one point behind the recipient, Dallas Stars forward and captain Jamie Benn. Additionally, Tavares was named a finalist for the Hart Memorial Trophy for the second time in his career; ultimately ceding the award to Montreal Canadiens goaltender Carey Price. On April 19, 2015, Tavares scored 15 seconds into overtime against Washington Capitals goaltender Braden Holtby in Game 3 of the Eastern Conference Quarterfinals of the 2015 playoffs. The goal, which gave the Islanders a 2–1 victory in the game and a 2–1 lead in the series, was the first game-winning overtime goal in the playoffs for the Islanders since 1993. Despite this, the Capitals would go on to win the series in seven games.

Tavares scored the first regular season goal for the Islanders at Barclays Center in a 3–2 overtime loss to the Chicago Blackhawks on Blackhawks' goaltender Corey Crawford during the first game of the 2015–16 season on October 9, 2015. On March 12, 2016, Tavares scored his 200th career NHL goal in a game against the Boston Bruins on Bruins' goaltender Tuukka Rask. That season, he was also named to the NHL All-Star Game for the third time in his career and was voted captain of the Metropolitan Division. He finished the 2015–16 season playing in 78 games with 33 goals, 37 assists and 70 points. Tavares was named a finalist for the Mark Messier Leadership Award, ultimately ceding the award to Nashville Predators defenceman and captain Shea Weber. On April 24, Game 6 of the Eastern Conference Quarterfinals against the Florida Panthers, trailing 1–0 in the final minute of play, assisted by Nikolay Kulemin and Nick Leddy, Tavares scored the game-tying goal on Panthers goaltender Roberto Luongo off a loose puck in the crease with 53.2 seconds left in regulation. He finished the job by scoring the series-clinching goal in double overtime, winning a playoff series for the Islanders for the first time since 1993 before getting ousted in the second round in five games by the Tampa Bay Lightning.

On January 13, 2017, in a game against the Florida Panthers, Tavares scored his 500th NHL point in his 550th career NHL game, making him the first player from his draft class to reach the milestone.

Tavares' contract with the Islanders was set to expire following the completion of the 2017–18 season, during which he recorded 37 goals, 47 assists and 84 points in all 82 games. With Tavares set to become an unrestricted free agent for the first time in his career, he decided to test the free-agent market by meeting with six teams in the days leading up to the opening of the signing window on July 1, including a meeting with the Islanders to contemplate re-signing before hitting free agency. (Note: The six teams Tavares granted meetings to included the Boston Bruins, Dallas Stars, New York Islanders, San Jose Sharks, Tampa Bay Lightning and Toronto Maple Leafs. Other teams also requested to meet with Tavares, but were denied.) Although many analysts predicted that Tavares would sign a new contract with New York before he hit the open market, the re-signing deadline passed without a new contract being signed, and Tavares officially became a free agent at noon (EDT) on July 1. Many publications called Tavares the biggest free agent in the modern history of the NHL. Just before 1 pm, almost one hour into the free agency period, it became public knowledge that Tavares had informed the Islanders he would be leaving the team and signing with Toronto.

==== Toronto Maple Leafs (2018–present) ====
On July 1, 2018, it was announced that Tavares had signed a seven-year, $77 million contract with his hometown team, the Toronto Maple Leafs. Tavares cited "Toronto's chances as a Stanley Cup contender, as well as living out his childhood dream to play for his hometown team", as his reason for signing the contract. Tavares rejected higher-paying offers in favour of joining the Maple Leafs, including a seven-year, $91 million offer from the San Jose Sharks that would have made Tavares the highest-paid player in the NHL. In his debut for the Maple Leafs in the 2018–19 season opener on October 4, 2018, against the Montreal Canadiens, Tavares scored his first goal for the club on goaltender Carey Price in a 3–2 overtime win. On October 7, Tavares recorded his ninth career NHL hat-trick (and first for Toronto) in a 7–6 overtime victory over the Chicago Blackhawks. On January 10, 2019, Tavares recorded his 300th goal in a 4–2 win over the New Jersey Devils on Devils goaltender Keith Kinkaid. Tavares made his first return to Long Island to play the Islanders on February 28, in a highly publicized, sold-out game. Tavares was relentlessly booed and heckled by Islanders fans throughout the match, including during his tribute video, and items were thrown at Tavares on the ice. The Islanders would win the game 6–1, scoring six unanswered goals after Toronto initially scored early in the game. In response to the way Tavares had been treated in his return to New York, fans and the Maple Leafs team organized a Tavares appreciation day two days later for a home match against the Buffalo Sabres, which garnered support from Toronto mayor John Tory; the day, which was dubbed "TavaresDayTO" concluded with the Maple Leafs defeating the Sabres 5–2 in a game in which Tavares scored. On March 17, Tavares recorded his 700th career NHL point with his 40th goal of the season in a 6–2 loss to the Ottawa Senators; in scoring that goal on Senators goaltender Anders Nilsson, Tavares also became the third player in Maple Leaf history to record 40 goals in his first season with the team. On March 26, Tavares recorded his tenth career NHL hat-trick (and first four-goal game) in a 7–5 win over the Florida Panthers. In so doing, he became just the third player in modern team history (since 1943) to record multiple hat-tricks in his debut season with the club, following Wilf Paiement and Daniel Marois. In the Maple Leafs' next game against the Islanders, Tavares recorded his 87th point of the season (a new career-high and his first point against his former team) in the 2–1 win, which clinched a playoff berth for Toronto. Tavares finished the season playing in all 82 games with 47 goals, 41 assists and 88 points recorded while the Maple Leafs as a team finished as the sixth seed in the East for the second consecutive season. His 47 goals led the team in goals and was third overall in the NHL only behind the 50 goals scored by Leon Draisaitl of the Edmonton Oilers and the league-leading 51 goals scored by Alexander Ovechkin, captain of the Washington Capitals. In the opening round of the 2019 playoffs, the Maple Leafs would be eliminated in seven games by the third-seeded Boston Bruins for the second consecutive year and surrendering a 3–2 series lead this time around. In the series, Tavares would also record two goals and three assists for five points in all seven games played.

Prior to the 2019–20 season, Tavares was granted a leave of absence from the team's first pre-season game in St. John's, Newfoundland and Labrador in September 2019 to spend with his wife and newborn son. On October 2, 2019, just before the first game of the NHL season against the Ottawa Senators, Tavares was named the 25th captain in the history of the Maple Leafs, filling a position that had been vacant for more than 3 1/2 years since the trade of Dion Phaneuf. On October 16, in a game against the Washington Capitals, Tavares sustained a broken finger after getting hit in the hand with the puck, which caused him to miss seven games. He then returned to the Leafs lineup on November 5, against the Los Angeles Kings.

On May 20, 2021, in the Leafs' opening Stanley Cup playoff game against the Montreal Canadiens, Tavares was upended by Canadiens defencemen Ben Chiarot. Canadiens forward Corey Perry attempted to jump over Tavares as he fell to the ice, in doing so, however, Perry's knee clipped Tavares in the head. Ultimately, Tavares was stretchered off the ice and was transported to the hospital. After the game, Perry felt remorse for his role on the incident: "I don't know what else to do there. I tried to jump. I know Johnny pretty well and just hope he's OK." Tavares was taken to St. Michael's Hospital, and was discharged the following day, but was ruled out indefinitely with a concussion. In his absence, the Leafs would rally to win three games in a row, but would ultimately lose the series to the Canadiens in seven games, surrendering a 3–1 series lead in the process.

Tavares recorded 27 goals and 49 assists for 76 points in 79 games during the 2021–22 season as the Maple Leafs as a team finished fourth in the East. In the 2022 playoffs, the Maple Leafs would once again fall in seven games, this time to the two-time defending Stanley Cup champion and fifth-seeded Tampa Bay Lightning, despite initially holding a 3–2 series lead. Tavares would end the series with three goals and assists for six points in all seven games played.

On November 15, 2022, Tavares scored his 400th NHL goal in a 5–2 victory over the Pittsburgh Penguins. He played his 1,000th NHL game on January 29, 2023, a 5–1 victory against the Washington Capitals in which he had two assists. Forbes remarked on the occasion that "in terms of individual achievements, the 32-year-old has absolutely realized the lofty potential that made him the first-overall pick in the 2009 NHL draft." Tavares finished the season playing in 80 games and recording 36 goals, 44 assists and 80 points. The Maple Leafs finished fourth in the league in the 2022–23 season, second in the Atlantic Division and third in the Eastern Conference, setting up a second consecutive first-round meeting with the Tampa Bay Lightning. While the Leafs were generally identified as the favourites going into the series as the higher seeded team, the long history of failure to advance past the first round was widely acknowledged. Many suggested that the outcome of the series would have major ramifications for the team going forward, including the status of both general manager Kyle Dubas and head coach Sheldon Keefe, as well as the long-term future of the core that included Tavares. Tavares recorded his first ever playoff hat-trick on April 20, in a first-round game against the sixth-seeded Lightning. He would go on to score the series-winning goal against Lightning goaltender Andrei Vasilevskiy in overtime in Game 6, sending the Maple Leafs to the second round for the first time since 2004. Tavares and the Maple Leafs would eventually be defeated in the second round by the eighth-seeded Florida Panthers in five games.

On December 11, 2023, entering a game against his former team, the New York Islanders, with 998 career points, Tavares recorded a goal and an assist to reach 1,000 career points in the NHL, becoming the 98th player to do so. His 1,000th point came from an assist on a game-tying goal by Morgan Rielly with 6.4 seconds left in the third period to send the game to overtime, which the Maple Leafs ultimately lost 4–3. The Islanders organization offered a congratulatory tribute to Tavares on the jumbotron prior to the overtime period, which was largely booed by the home New York fans in attendance. He ended the 2023–24 campaign with 29 goals and 36 assists for 65 points in 80 games along with a goal and an assist for two points in all seven games as the Leafs were defeated in the first round in seven games by the Boston Bruins once more.

Entering his final season under contract, Tavares relinquished his role as captain to Auston Matthews on August 14, 2024, instead stepping into the role of alternate captain, the same position he was in during the 2018–19 campaign, his first season with the team. On December 20, Tavares recorded his 600th career assist on a goal by William Nylander in a 6–3 win over the Buffalo Sabres. On December 23, Tavares scored both goals in a 5–2 loss to the Winnipeg Jets on Jets' goaltender Connor Hellebuyck. The first goal would mark his 200th goal as a Maple Leaf, becoming the fifth player in NHL history (besides Wayne Gretzky, Mark Messier, Keith Tkachuk and Lanny McDonald) to record at least 200 goals with more than one organization. He ended the 2024–25 season with 38 goals and 36 assists for 74 points in 75 games. His 38 goals were second on the team and his 74 points were fourth. In the 2025 playoffs, Tavares and the Maple Leafs defeated the Ottawa Senators in six games before falling in the second round in seven games by the defending Stanley Cup champion Florida Panthers. Tavares ended the playoffs with five goals and two assists for seven points in all 13 contests.

On June 27, 2025, the Maple Leafs signed Tavares to a four-year contract extension, worth an average $4.38 million per season. The contract was viewed as a significant hometown discount from Tavares in an effort to remain with his childhood team and provide the club with cap space flexibility, with Tavares being expected to potentially earn several million more dollars a season as an unrestricted free agent, although Tavares had expressed his intentions to re-sign with Toronto throughout his final contract year.

On October 29, 2025, Tavares scored his 500th goal against the Columbus Blue Jackets, becoming the 49th player to do so.

== International play ==
Medal record

Men's ice hockey

Representing Canada

Winter Olympics
Gold medal – first place	2014 Sochi	Team

World Cup of Hockey
Gold medal – first place	2016 Toronto	

World Junior Championships
Gold medal – first place	2008 Czech Republic	
Gold medal – first place	2009 Canada	

Spengler Cup
Gold medal – first place	2012 Davos	

=== Junior ===
During his rookie season in the OHL, Tavares competed for Team Ontario in the 2006 World U-17 Hockey Challenge in Saskatchewan as a 15-year-old, but failed to medal. Later that year, at the end of the 2005–06 season, he was selected to join Canada's under-18 team for the 2006 IIHF World U18 Championships in Sweden, but failed to medal once more, falling to the Czech Republic in the bronze medal game. Later in the off-season, he was invited to the under-18 team's summer training camp to prepare for the 2006 Ivan Hlinka Memorial Tournament in the Czech Republic and Slovakia, though an injury ultimately prevented him from participating.

During the following season, Tavares was invited to Canada's national junior selection camp in preparation for the 2007 World Junior Championships, but was not named to the final roster. After completing his second OHL season, however, Tavares was named to the Canada's junior team for the 2007 Super Series against Russian junior players. He scored four goals and one assist as Canada won the series 7–0–1.

Tavares earned another invite to the selection camp for the 2008 World Junior Championships and made the final roster for the tournament on his second attempt. He scored four goals to help Canada to its fourth-straight gold medal in the competition. Returning the next year, along with Zach Boychuk, P. K. Subban and Thomas Hickey from the previous year's gold medal-winning team, Tavares was selected to compete in the 2009 World Junior Championships in Ottawa, Ontario. He scored three points in the first round-robin game against the Czech Republic, an 8–1 win, and was named Player of the game. In the final round-robin game against the United States, Tavares scored a hat-trick for his 12th career goal of the tournament to tie Eric Lindros and Jeff Carter for the all-time Canadian junior record. In doing so, Tavares helped propel Canada to a 7–4 win that gave them the top spot in their pool and a subsequent bye to the tournament semifinal. He was also named Player of the game for the second time in the tournament for his performance on the night. Meeting Russia in the semifinal and down 5–4 with less than ten seconds left in regulation, Tavares fought off two Russian players along the boards and backhanded a shot towards the goal. The shot was blocked by defenceman Dmitri Kulikov a few feet in front of the net, but after the puck came loose, teammate Jordan Eberle retrieved it and sent it into the right side of the net to dramatically tie the game with 5.4 seconds left. Then, as the game was forced into a shootout, Tavares scored to put Canada up 2–0 in the tie-breaker and into the gold medal game against Sweden. Recording an assist in the final, he helped Canada defeat the Swedes 5–1 to capture their fifth-straight gold medal. Tavares finished the tournament with eight goals and seven assists for 15 points in six games, second only to teammate Cody Hodgson in tournament scoring. Tavares was also named one of the top three players on the Canadian team by its coaching staff, as well as a tournament All-Star, Top Forward and MVP.

=== Senior ===
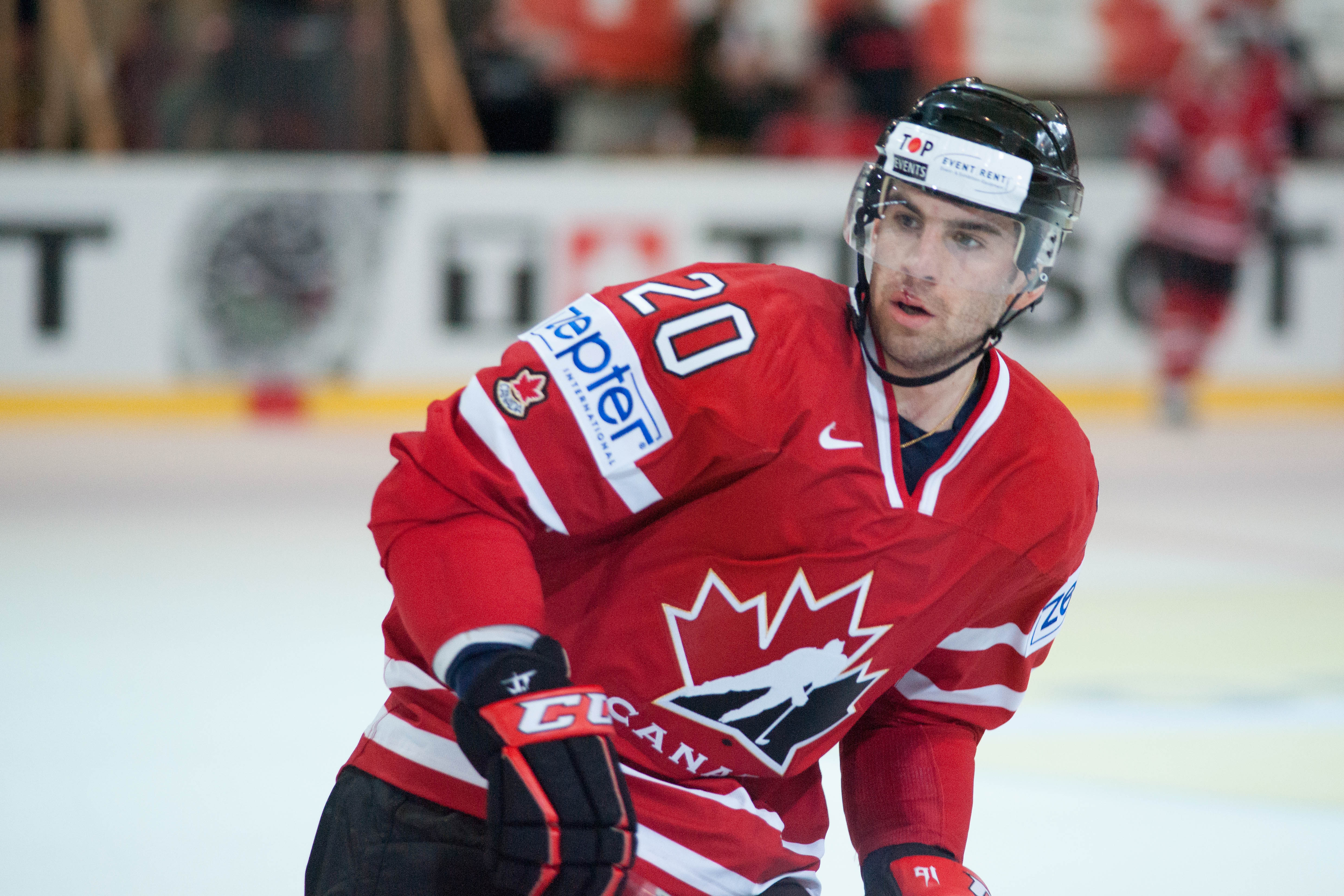
Tavares as a member of the Canadian ice hockey team during the 2012 Spengler Cup

As the New York Islanders failed to qualify for the playoffs in Tavares' rookie season in the NHL, he was selected to the Canadian men's team for the 2010 IIHF World Championship in Germany. Canada General Manager Mark Messier made a specific effort to assemble a young team; as a result, Tavares was one of five teenagers on the final roster. With seven goals in seven games, Tavares led all tournament players in goal-scoring. Despite recording no assists, he ranked fifth in points. He helped Canada to the quarterfinal against Russia, where they were defeated 5–2.

The following year, Tavares returned to the national team for the 2011 IIHF World Championship in Slovakia. He improved to nine points over seven games with five goals and four assists to lead Canada in scoring; he ranked fifth among all tournament players for the second consecutive year. As Canada again reached the quarterfinal, they were eliminated once more by Russia, losing 2–1. Tavares was chosen by coaches as one of the three best players on Team Canada, along with defenceman Alex Pietrangelo and forward Andrew Ladd.

Tavares played for SC Bern in Switzerland during the 2012–13 NHL lock-out and quickly became the PostFinance Top Scorer, tallying 42 points—including 17 goals—in just 28 games. He also played for Team Canada at the 2012 Spengler Cup, which the nation ultimately won after defeating HC Davos in the final.

Named to Canada's Olympic team for the 2014 Winter Olympics, Tavares injured his knee in Team Canada's quarterfinal match against Latvia. As a result, he was unable to play for the remainder of the tournament, as well as the 2013–14 NHL season. He watched the team's eventual gold medal win over Sweden from the dressing room, and joined the medal ceremony on crutches. Tavares would later reflect on the tournament as "bittersweet."

Tavares rejoined Team Canada for the 2016 World Cup of Hockey, the first time the event was held in twelve years. The team reached the event final, where they defeated Team Europe 2–1 to secure the gold.

After the Maple Leafs were eliminated from the 2019 Stanley Cup playoffs by the Boston Bruins, Tavares committed to play for Team Canada at the 2019 IIHF World Championship in Slovakia. However, shortly before the first game of the tournament, it was announced that Tavares had suffered an oblique injury and would be returning to Toronto.

Following the Maple Leafs' first-round exit from the 2024 Stanley Cup playoffs, Tavares was a late addition to the Team Canada roster for the 2024 IIHF World Championship. He was thereafter named team captain for the tournament. As he had only arrived on site a short time beforehand, Tavares did not dress for Team Canada's opening game against Great Britain.

== Playing style ==
Tavares has been praised by his coaches for his ability to anticipate the play since he joined the OHL. A lack of speed had been the most common criticism of Tavares' play, something he spent his junior career attempting to improve. Tavares' skating speed is something he greatly improved since turning professional.

The media hype he has encountered has led Tavares to remain guarded when speaking to the media, while his teammates and family attempt to shield him from the spotlight where they can. However, Tavares is regarded as a natural leader on the ice, and a player who puts his team first. The Oshawa Generals named Tavares their team captain in 2008, while he also served as the alternate captain with the Canadian junior team in 2009.

== Personal life ==
Tavares has four children with his wife Aryne. After the birth of his oldest he began writing his children's names on his stick before every game.

== Career statistics ==
=== Regular season and playoffs ===
			Regular season					Playoffs
Season	Team	League	GP	G	A	Pts	PIM	GP	G	A	Pts	PIM
2004–05	Toronto Marlboros	GTHL	72	91	67	158	—	—	—	—	—	—
2004–05	Milton Icehawks	OPJHL	20	13	15	28	10	—	—	—	—	—
2005–06	Oshawa Generals	OHL	65	45	32	77	72	—	—	—	—	—
2006–07	Oshawa Generals	OHL	67	72	62	134	60	9	7	12	19	6
2007–08	Oshawa Generals	OHL	59	40	78	118	69	15	3	13	16	20
2008–09	Oshawa Generals	OHL	32	26	28	54	32	—	—	—	—	—
2008–09	London Knights	OHL	24	32	18	50	22	14	10	11	21	8
2009–10	New York Islanders	NHL	82	24	30	54	22	—	—	—	—	—
2010–11	New York Islanders	NHL	79	29	38	67	53	—	—	—	—	—
2011–12	New York Islanders	NHL	82	31	50	81	26	—	—	—	—	—
2012–13	SC Bern	NLA	28	17	25	42	28	—	—	—	—	—
2012–13	New York Islanders	NHL	48	28	19	47	18	6	3	2	5	4
2013–14	New York Islanders	NHL	59	24	42	66	40	—	—	—	—	—
2014–15	New York Islanders	NHL	82	38	48	86	46	7	2	4	6	2
2015–16	New York Islanders	NHL	78	33	37	70	38	11	6	5	11	6
2016–17	New York Islanders	NHL	77	28	38	66	38	—	—	—	—	—
2017–18	New York Islanders	NHL	82	37	47	84	26	—	—	—	—	—
2018–19	Toronto Maple Leafs	NHL	82	47	41	88	34	7	2	3	5	0
2019–20	Toronto Maple Leafs	NHL	63	26	34	60	24	5	2	1	3	0
2020–21	Toronto Maple Leafs	NHL	56	19	31	50	14	1	0	0	0	0
2021–22	Toronto Maple Leafs	NHL	79	27	49	76	32	7	3	3	6	2
2022–23	Toronto Maple Leafs	NHL	80	36	44	80	34	11	4	4	8	4
2023–24	Toronto Maple Leafs	NHL	80	29	36	65	30	7	1	1	2	2
2024–25	Toronto Maple Leafs	NHL	75	38	36	74	46	13	5	2	7	10
2025–26	Toronto Maple Leafs	NHL	82	31	40	71	28	—	—	—	—	—
NHL totals			1,266	525	660	1,185	549	75	28	25	53	30

=== International ===
Year	Team	Event	Result	GP	G	A	Pts	PIM
2006	Canada	WJC18	4th	7	2	3	5	4
2007	Canada	SS	1st place, gold medalist(s)	8	1	8	9	26
2008	Canada	WJC	1st place, gold medalist(s)	7	4	1	5	2
2009	Canada	WJC	1st place, gold medalist(s)	6	8	7	15	0
2010	Canada	WC	7th	7	7	0	7	6
2011	Canada	WC	5th	7	5	4	9	12
2012	Canada	WC	5th	8	4	5	9	12
2014	Canada	Oly	1st place, gold medalist(s)	4	0	0	0	0
2016	Canada	WCH	1st place, gold medalist(s)	6	1	3	4	0
2024	Canada	WC	4th	9	2	9	11	6
2026	Canada	WC	4th	10	3	3	6	0
Junior totals				28	15	19	34	32
Senior totals				51	22	24	46	36

== Awards and honours ==
Award	Year
OHL
Jack Ferguson Award	2005
OHL First All-Rookie Team	2006
Emms Family Award	2006
OHL first All-Star team	2007
Red Tilson Trophy	2007
Eddie Powers Memorial Trophy	2009
OHL second All-Star team	2009
CHL
CHL All-Rookie Team	2006
CHL Rookie of the Year	2006
CHL first All-Star team	2007, 2009
CHL Player of the Year	2007
CHL Top Draft Prospect Award	2009
CHL Top Prospects Game Invitee	2009
NHL
NHL All-Rookie Team	2010
NHL All-Star	2012, 2015, 2016, 2017, 2018, 2019
First NHL All-Star team	2015
International
U17 WHC All-Star team	2006
WJC All-Star team	2009
WJC Best Forward	2009
WJC Most Valuable Player	2009

== Notes ==
Awards and achievements
Preceded by Alexander Radulov	CHL Player of the Year; 2007	Succeeded by Justin Azevedo
Preceded by Steve Mason	World Junior MVP; 2009	Succeeded by Jordan Eberle
Preceded by Viktor Tikhonov	World Junior Best Forward; 2009	Succeeded by Jordan Eberle
Sporting positions
Preceded by Steven Stamkos	NHL first overall draft pick 2009	Succeeded by Taylor Hall
Preceded by Josh Bailey	New York Islanders first round pick 2009	Succeeded by Calvin de Haan
Preceded by Mark Streit	New York Islanders captain 2013–18	Succeeded by Anders Lee
Preceded by Dion Phaneuf	Toronto Maple Leafs captain 2019–2024	Succeeded by Auston Matthews
