= Pius Suter =

Swiss ice hockey player (born 1996)

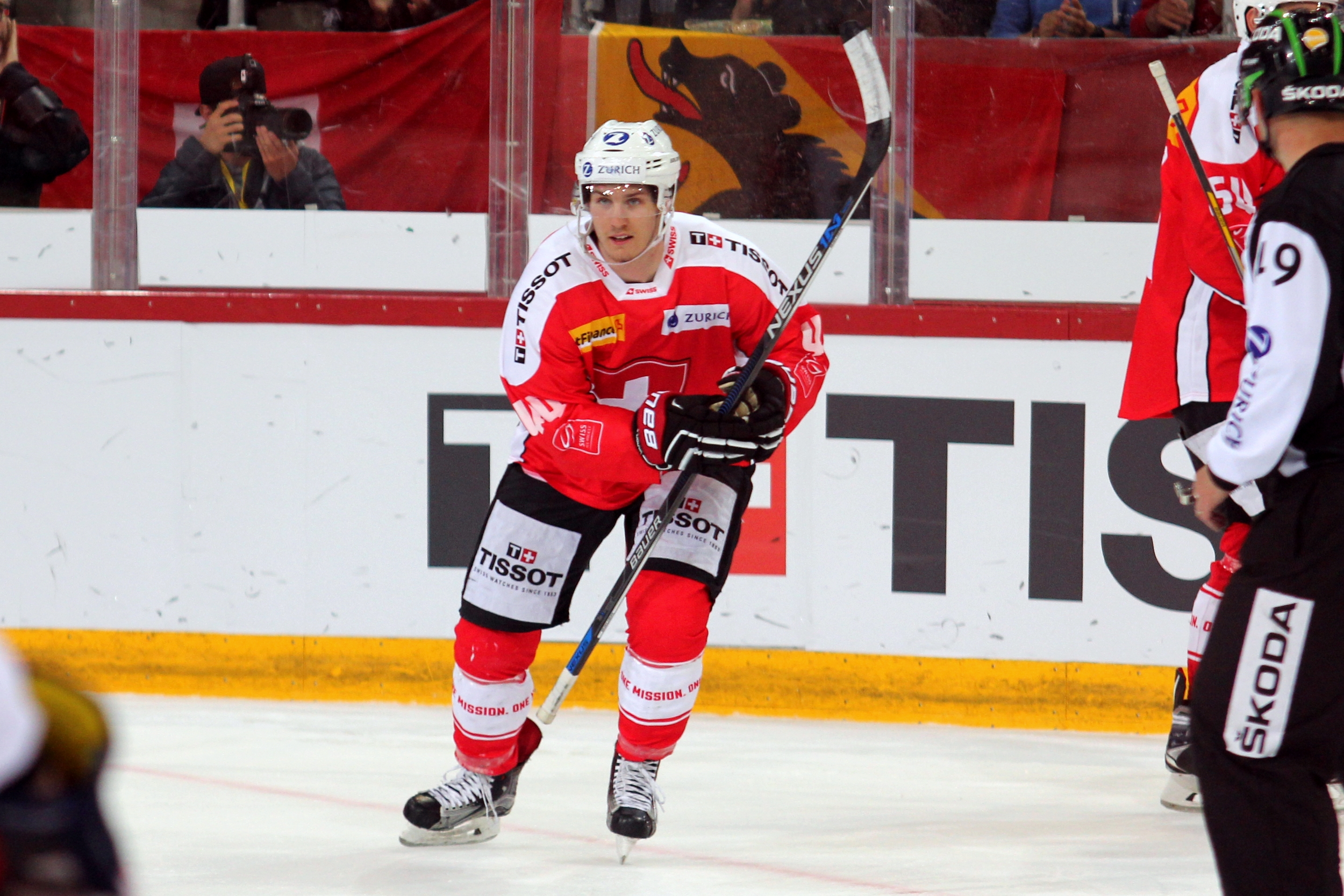
- Suter with Switzerland in 2017
- Born: 24 May 1996 (age 30) Wallisellen, Switzerland
- Height: 5 ft 11 in (180 cm)
- Weight: 176 lb (80 kg; 12 st 8 lb)
- Position: Forward
- Shoots: Left
- NHL team Former teams: St. Louis Blues; ZSC Lions; Chicago Blackhawks; Detroit Red Wings; Vancouver Canucks
- National team: Switzerland
- NHL draft: Undrafted
- Playing career: 2015–present

Pius Suter (born 24 May 1996) is a Swiss professional ice hockey player who is a forward for the St. Louis Blues of the National Hockey League (NHL). He has also played for the Chicago Blackhawks, Detroit Red Wings and Vancouver Canucks.

== Playing career ==
Suter played as a youth in the junior program of the ZSC Lions before opting to play major junior hockey in North America with the Guelph Storm of the Ontario Hockey League (OHL) after his selection in the CHL Import Draft in 2013. Suter helped contribute with 24 points in 66 games as Guelph were crowned OHL champions. At the completion of his second season with the Storm in 2014–15, Suter recorded a break-out season in posting over a point-per-game average with 72 in just 61 games with Guelph.

At the end of his junior career, Suter opted to pursue his professional career with the ZSC Lions. In the 2016–17 season, Suter was signed to a one-year contract extension through 2018 on 20 December 2016.

On 26 August 2017, Suter scored a Champions Hockey League (CHL) record of four goals with the Lions in an 11–1 win against French team, Rapaces de Gap.

Suter was invited to the 2017 Ottawa Senators rookie camp in September, forcing him to miss the start of the 2017–18 season. On his return, Suter would go on to be a part of the ZSC Lions NL championship winning team, leading the team in assists for the season.

Prior to the start of the 2018–19 season, the ZSC Lions announced that Suter had been included in the training camp roster for the New York Islanders. Returning to ZSC after failing to gain a contract with the Islanders, on 28 November 2018, Suter agreed to an early four-year contract extension with the Lions through the 2022–23 season.

Suter finished the 2019–20 season as the league's PostFinance Top Scorer with 53 points, including 30 goals, in 50 regular season games. He was also named MVP of the regular season. On 13 July 2020, Suter announced he was leaving the NL and the ZSC Lions, using his exit-clause in his contract in order to pursue his career in North America and the NHL.

On 16 July 2020, Suter was signed as an undrafted free agent to a one-year, entry-level contract with the Chicago Blackhawks. With the 2020–21 North American season set to be delayed due to the ongoing COVID-19 pandemic, Suter remained in Switzerland and was loaned by the Blackhawks to return to ZSC Lions' affiliate, the GCK Lions of the Swiss League, on 9 September 2020. On 2 November, with the NHL future still uncertain, Suter officially returned to the ZSC Lions.

On 20 December 2020, after making six appearances with the Lions, Suter was recalled from loan by the Blackhawks. Suter made his NHL debut with the Blackhawks on 13 January 2021 against the Tampa Bay Lightning. Suter scored his first NHL goal, as well as his first career hat trick, on 24 January against Jonathan Bernier of the Detroit Red Wings. He became the second player in franchise history to score each of his first three career NHL goals in the same game, joining Bill Kendall on 17 December 1933.

On 28 July 2021, the Detroit Red Wings signed Suter to a two-year contract. Appearing in all 82 regular season games during the 2021–22 season, Suter recorded 15 goals and 21 assists in his first year with the Red Wings.

On 11 August 2023, as an unrestricted free agent, Suter signed a two-year, $3.6 million contract with the Vancouver Canucks.

On 2 July 2025, Suter signed a two-year, $8.25 million contract with the St. Louis Blues.

== International play ==
Medal record

Men's ice hockey

Representing Switzerland

World Championships
Silver medal – second place	2026 Switzerland	

Suter first represented Switzerland at the junior level at the 2013 IIHF World U18 Championships. He also featured for the Swiss at the 2013 Ivan Hlinka Memorial Tournament and in two World Junior Championships in 2015, and 2016.

Suter was added to the Swiss national team at the senior level in preparation for the 2017 IIHF World Championship. He would make the final squad and make his full international debut in the round-robin stage.

Suter was named as part of Switzerland's roster for the 2018 Winter Olympics, where he scored a hat-trick in the game against South Korea, also adding assists on Switzerland's lone goals in the game against the Czech Republic and the playoff game against Germany.

== Career statistics ==
=== Regular season and playoffs ===
			Regular season					Playoffs
Season	Team	League	GP	G	A	Pts	PIM	GP	G	A	Pts	PIM
2012–13	GCK Lions	Elite Jr. A	33	12	9	21	14	9	3	0	3	4
2013–14	Guelph Storm	OHL	66	9	15	24	16	20	6	2	8	2
2014–15	Guelph Storm	OHL	61	43	29	72	28	9	3	2	5	10
2015–16	GCK Lions	Elite Jr. A	1	0	1	1	2	6	3	5	8	4
2015–16	GCK Lions	NLB	1	0	1	1	2	—	—	—	—	—
2015–16	ZSC Lions	NLA	45	14	10	24	14	4	1	0	1	2
2016–17	ZSC Lions	NLA	38	17	11	28	16	6	2	2	4	0
2017–18	ZSC Lions	NL	36	11	28	39	12	18	5	6	11	8
2018–19	ZSC Lions	NL	41	9	15	24	16	—	—	—	—	—
2019–20	ZSC Lions	NL	50	30	23	53	16	—	—	—	—	—
2020–21	GCK Lions	SL	6	2	3	5	4	—	—	—	—	—
2020–21	ZSC Lions	NL	6	2	3	5	8	—	—	—	—	—
2020–21	Chicago Blackhawks	NHL	55	14	13	27	14	—	—	—	—	—
2021–22	Detroit Red Wings	NHL	82	15	21	36	22	—	—	—	—	—
2022–23	Detroit Red Wings	NHL	79	14	10	24	6	—	—	—	—	—
2023–24	Vancouver Canucks	NHL	67	14	15	29	16	13	2	1	3	6
2024–25	Vancouver Canucks	NHL	81	25	21	46	18	—	—	—	—	—
2025–26	St. Louis Blues	NHL	64	13	16	29	20	—	—	—	—	—
NL totals			216	83	90	173	82	28	8	8	16	10
NHL totals			428	95	96	191	96	13	2	1	3	6

=== International ===
Year	Team	Event	Result	GP	G	A	Pts	PIM
2013	Switzerland	U18	6th	5	3	0	3	4
2013	Switzerland	IH18	6th	4	1	2	3	2
2015	Switzerland	WJC	9th	6	2	0	2	2
2016	Switzerland	WJC	9th	6	3	1	4	4
2017	Switzerland	WC	6th	8	1	2	3	4
2018	Switzerland	OG	10th	4	3	2	5	0
2022	Switzerland	WC	5th	8	3	5	8	4
2026	Switzerland	OG	5th	5	2	1	3	0
2026	Switzerland	WC	2nd place, silver medalist(s)	5	1	3	4	6
Junior totals				21	9	3	12	12
Senior totals				30	10	13	23	14
