= PostFinance =

Financial services subsidiary of Swiss Post

Coordinates: 46.9571°N 7.4679°E

Postfinance Ltd

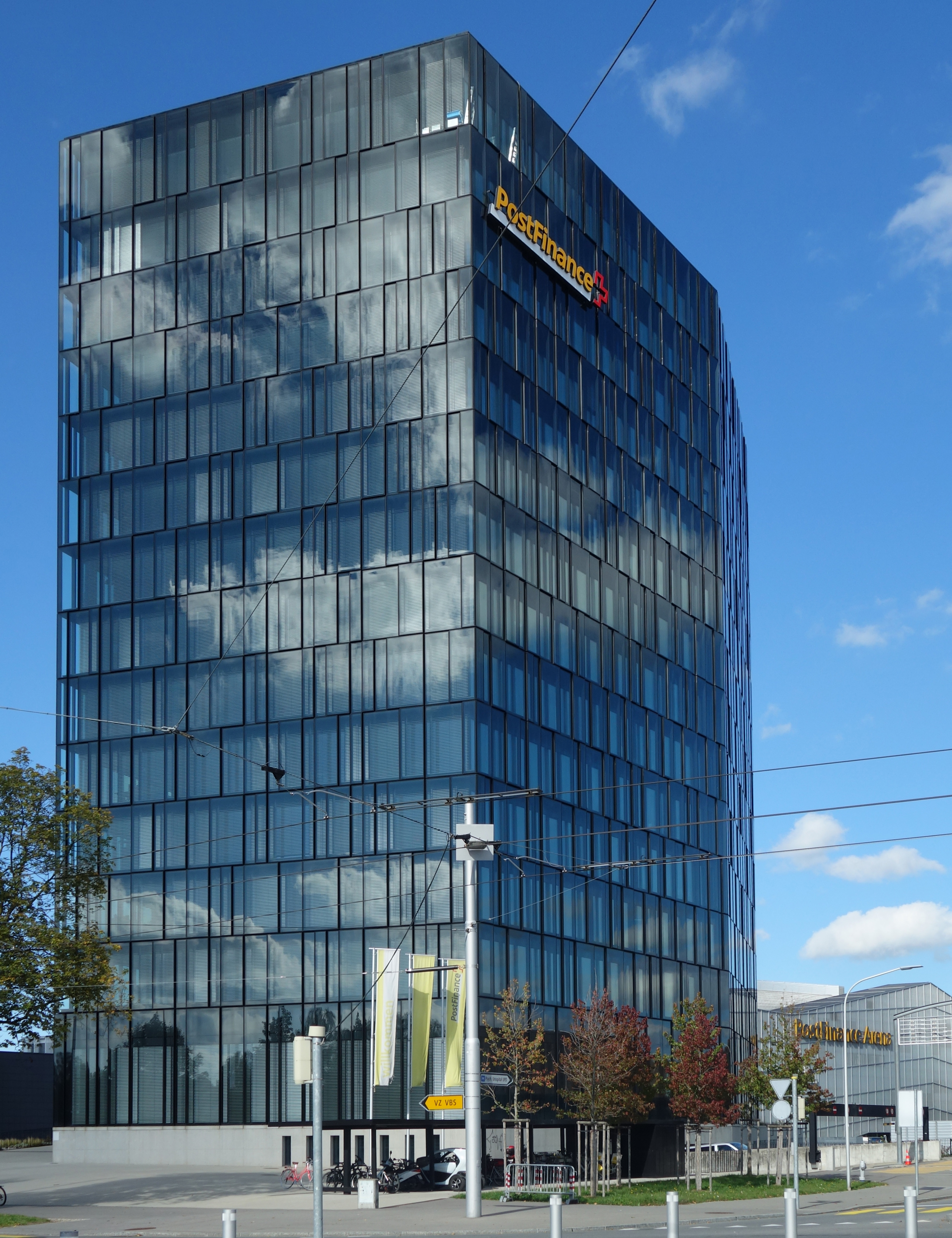
- PostFinance headquarters in Bern
- Type: Subsidiary
- Industry: Banking; Financial services
- Founded: 1906; 120 years ago
- Headquarters: Bern, Switzerland
- Area served: Switzerland
- Key people: Beat Röthlisberger (chairman)
- Products: Investment banking; Investment management; Wealth management; Private banking; Corporate banking; Private equity; Finance and Insurance; Consumer banking; Mortgages; Credit cards; Cryptocurrencies
- Operating income: CHF 1.240 billion (2023)
- Net income: ▲CHF 190 million (2023)
- Parent: Swiss Post
- Website: postfinance.ch

Postfinance Ltd (own spelling PostFinance) is a subsidiary company of the state-owned Swiss Post, whose foundations date back to the early 20th century as the financial services department of Swiss Post. Postfinance is active in retail banking and business client business and as such is one of the largest Swiss financial institutions.

Its main area of activity is in the national and international payments and a smaller but growing part in the areas of savings, investment, pensions, real estate and digital investments. Since 2013, Postfinance holds a banking licence and is under the supervision of the Swiss Financial Market Supervisory Authority (FINMA). In 2015, Postfinance was classified as systemically important by the Swiss National Bank in Switzerland and must comply with special rules on capital adequacy and liquidity and submit an emergency plan.

== History ==
Postfinance traces its origins back to 1900, when the "Postcheck and Giro Service" was launched in Switzerland to enable the supply of cash via the network of the Swiss Post. Six years later, the processing of payment transactions via the post office network began. Between 1928 and 1997, the Swiss Post was part of the Post-, Telefon- und Telegrafenbetriebe (PTT). When PTT was dissolved at the end of 1997 as part of a postal reform, the former payment transactions department became the Swiss Post subsidiary Postfinance. In the years that followed, Postfinance experienced strong growth.

In 2001, Postfinance was connected to the domestic payment system Swiss Interbank Clearing (SIC) of the banks. Postfinance emerged from the 2008 financial crisis without any adverse effects and was able to offer low interest rates, as a result of which the customer base increased and customer assets doubled within a few years. However, Postfinance had problems with the temporary negative interest rates in the 2010s, as the negative interest rates led to falling interest income.

In 2013, the Swiss Financial Market Supervisory Authority (FINMA) awarded Postfinance a bank licence. In 2015, Postfinance was declared a "Systemically important financial institution" in Switzerland by the Swiss National Bank, which means the bank must follow special regulations with regard to liquidity and equity. At the same time, obtaining the banking licence meant that the state guarantee was finally abolished in 2017.

In 2016, Postfinance started to levy a 1% annual fee on deposits that exceeded 1 million francs. Over the Easter weekend of 2018, Postfinance switched to the core banking system of the Indian provider Tata Consultancy Services. For corporate customers, the changeover meant adapting payment transactions to a new data format for the exchange of payment data in accordance with the ISO 20022 standard. In 2020, Postfinance profits fell to 131 million Swiss francs (from 246 million in 2019 and 229 million francs in 2018) and its customers to 2.69 million (from 2.74 million in 2019). 129 jobs were cut to adjust to the revenue drop (500 jobs were also cut in 2018).

In early 2021, the Swiss government was considering the privatization of the bank to allow it to act like a regular private financial institution (including granting mortgages and loans). This process would however imply changing the Postal Act and have the government back the bank's capital during a transition phase. The proposal was not able to gain acceptance within Swiss politics for the time being. In February 2022, the Russian oligarch and resident of Switzerland Viktor Vekselberg won a lawsuit against Postfinance after the bank had closed his account in 2018 following sanctions imposed on him by the US authorities.

In 2022, the cash deposit machines were abolished. The ATMs, which were introduced from 1978 under the name Postomat, have also already been reduced. While Postfinance still operated 975 ATMs at the end of 2019, this figure had fallen to 892 by the end of September 2021.

In April 2023, it was announced that Postfinance will provide its customers with access to cryptocurrencies, Bitcoin and Ethereum. The project is being implemented in partnership with the Sygnum cryptobank. The decision was made against the backdrop of a massive flow of customer funds into cryptocurrencies.

== Company structure ==
Postfinance Ltd is wholly owned by Swiss Post. Postfinance makes an important contribution to Swiss Post's total operating income. Total assets amounted to around CHF 102 billion at the end of 2023, while net profit (EBIT) for the full year 2023 was around CHF 164 million. In 2023, Postfinance served around 2.5 million people and had the equivalent of 3,340 full-time equivalents, with an average total headcount of 3,757 employees.

With the end of the previous state guarantee, Postfinance, has a deposit insurance for savings like other banks since October 1, 2017. If the bankrupt institution has sufficient liquid assets, deposits at domestic and foreign branches will be paid out immediately up to a maximum amount of CHF100.000 per client.

Postfinance has various shareholdings in companies and ventures. For example, there are cooperative participations with "Twint", in which Postfinance holds a 26.666% stake, and "SIX Group". In 2021, Postfinance launched the Neobank "Yuh" in a joint venture with Swissquote.

The legal basis for the activities of Swiss Post and Postfinance is the Swiss Postal Act (Schweizer Postgesetz), the Postal regulation (Postfinance) and the Postal Organization Act (Postorganisationsgesetz).

=== Management ===
Postfinance is managed by a Board of Directors as the highest governing body and an Executive Board, which is appointed by the Board of Directors and is responsible for the operational business. Both the Board of Directors and the Executive Board each have seven members as of 2024.

Since July 1, 2024, Beat Röthlisberger, previously Deputy Managing Director of Basellandschaftliche Kantonalbank, has been the Chairman of Postfinance Executive Board. His predecessors in this position are Urs W. Wepf (until the end of 2002), Jürg Bucher (2003 until the end of 2011), Hansruedi Köng (2012 until February 2024), Kurt Fuchs (interim, March to June 2024).

=== Company data ===
	2003	2004	2005	2006	2007	2008	2009	2010	2011	2012	2013	2015	2016	2017	2018	2019	2020	2021	2022	2023
Balance sheet total (in CHF billion)	43.1	44.2	47.3	52.1	56.2	67.2	80.3	89.3	104	115	115	114.5	119.5	120.8	118.2	125.7	117.2	121.7	114.4	102.3
Customer deposits/assets (in CHF billion)	32.8	35.7	38.2	40.6	43.7	58	75	84	95	103	108	114.9	119.4	119.8	118.9	119.7	123.7	110.7	104.6	104.1
of which in deposit and investment form (in CHF billion)	7.6	9.7	11.2	13.1	14.7	17.7	23.9	29.3	33	37	38	not specified	not specified	not specified	not specified	not specified	not specified	not specified	15.9	17.7
Net profit (EBIT, in CHF million)	243	278	312	246	318	229	441	571	591	625	719	575	575	543	229	246	129	223	190	164
Number of employees (full-time equivalents, annual average)	2,148	2,246	2,390	2,526	2,709	2,889	3,042	3,265	3,425	3,473	3,432	3,571	3,599	3,474	3,325	3,243	3,260	3,237	3,250	3,340
Number of customer accounts (in thousands)	2,746	2,879	3,008	3,154	3,335	3,646	3,881	4,079	4,211	4,520	4,628	4,835	4,845	4,809	4,503	4,401	4,286	4,037	3,918	3,877

== Business areas ==
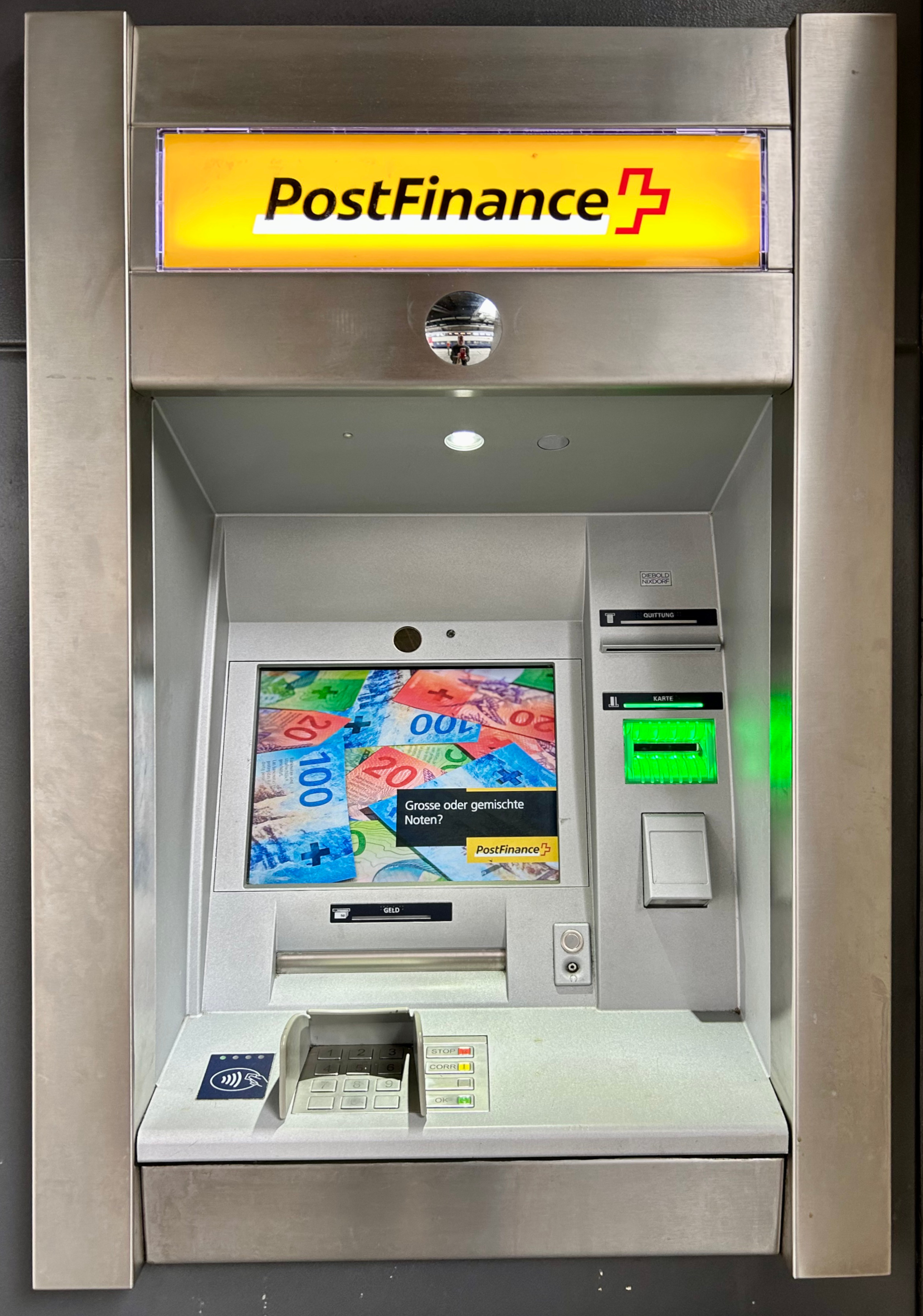
Postomat: ATM of Postfinance, which also works with other bank cards in addition to the Postfinance Card.

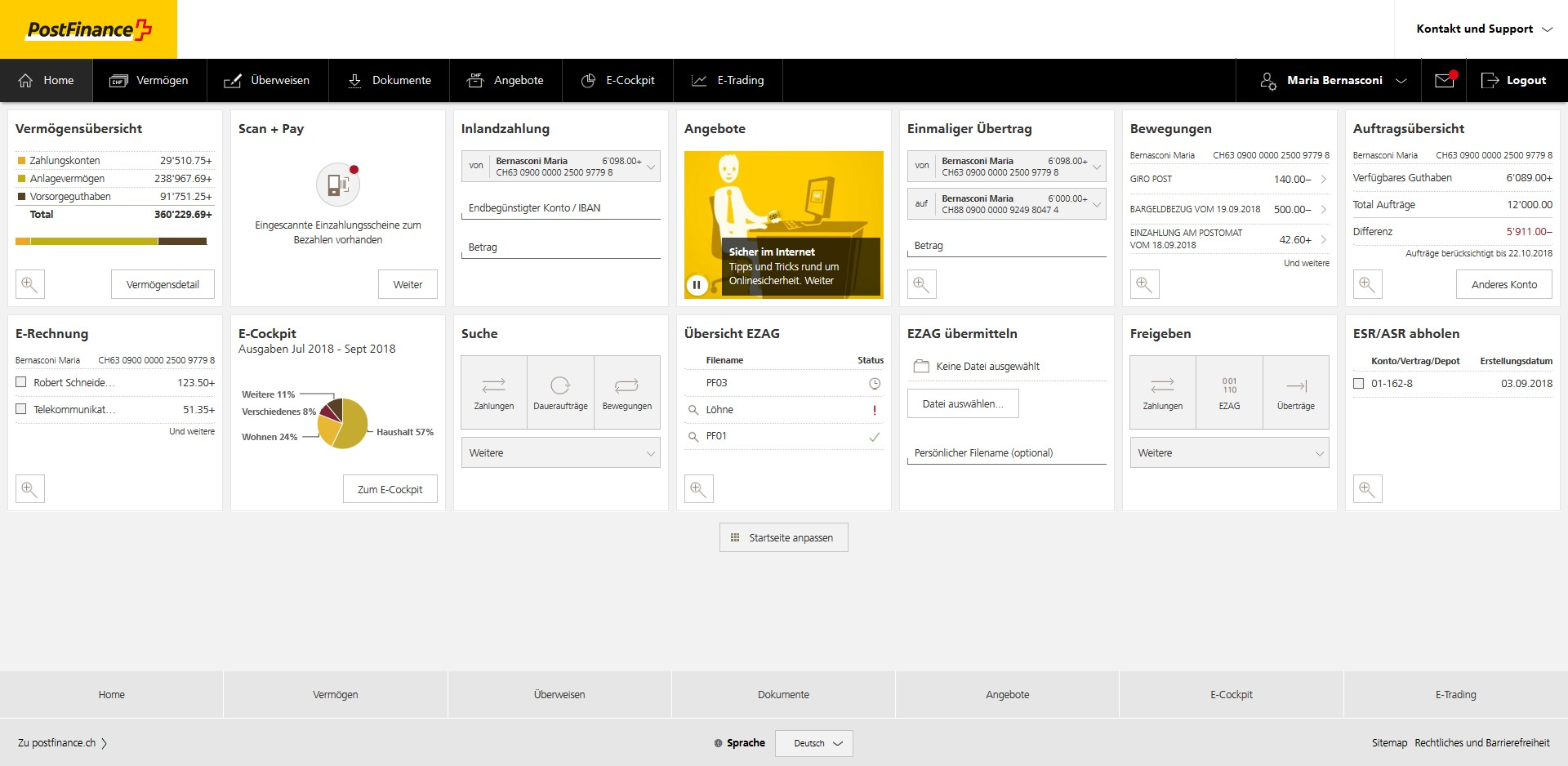
User interface of Postfinance online banking (in 2018)

- Payment transactions: Postfinance core business is national and international payment transactions. Around 900 million transactions per year were processed via Postfinance in 2011.
- Savings: The savings area includes the private account range (since July 2021 consisting of the Smart and SmartPlus banking packages).
- Investments: The investment division comprises our own investment products and those offered in cooperation with other banks. Own investment products include medium-term notes and investment strategy funds. Postfinance also offers third-party funds from other financial institutions. Postfinance also operates an online platform for securities trading (e-trading) in cooperation with Swissquote. In February 2024, Postfinance also began offering the trading and custody of cryptocurrencies.
- Pension provision and insurance: In the area of pensions, Postfinance offers a pension account tailored to the three-pillar pension system in Switzerland and, in cooperation with AXA Winterthur Leben, various life insurance options. In 2022, Postfinance announced that it would only offer actively managed pension funds, which resulted in an increase in fees for customers.
- Financing: As the Postal Organization Act prohibits it from granting mortgages and loans to third parties on its own, Postfinance cooperates with Münchener Hypothekenbank, Valiant Bank and Credit Exchange AG in the area of financing. The loans and mortgages are not refinanced by Postfinance itself, but by the three partners, who also carry them on their balance sheets and bear the credit risk. In return, Postfinance pays its partners a risk premium or a sales commission. In the area of crowdlending, Postfinance entered into a partnership with Cembra Money Bank through its subsidiary Lendico in 2018. In May 2021, the company announced that it would be offering the "Postfinance Priavtkredit" in cooperation with Bob Finance. Bob Finance is a subsidiary of the Valora retail company. The personal loan is offered exclusively online to private individuals with a permanent employment contract, Swiss residence and an account with a Swiss bank. In August 2024, Postfinance became a shareholder in the mortgage market platform Credit Exchange AG (CredEx) and was also given a seat on the board of directors of the public limited company. Prior to this, Postfinance and Credit Exchange AG had already entered into a sales and settlement partnership from the beginning of 2024.
- Customer Service: Postfinance is active in the area of customer service with customer advisors and a call centre.

== Sponsoring ==
Postfinance is a regular sponsor of ice hockey. Since 2001, it has been a sponsor of the National League, the highest Swiss men's ice hockey league. Postfinance has also been the main and naming rights partner of the Women's League, the highest women's league in Swiss ice hockey, since the 2022/23 season. The league is therefore also known as the "Postfinance Women's League". Postfinance is also named Postfinance Top Scorer, an award for ice hockey players who achieve the most scorer points (i.e. goals and assists) for their team during the main round. Scorer points achieved are also linked to money sponsored by Postfinance for the promotion of young talent at the players' ice hockey clubs.

In 2007, the BernArena, the largest ice rink in Switzerland, was renamed the Postfinance Arena.

Under the name "Money Fit", Postfinance offers learning opportunities designed to teach children and young people various skills in dealing with money.

== Description ==
As of December 2024, Postfinance has an AA/A-1+ credit rating from Standard & Poor's.

== See also ==
- Banking in Switzerland
