= Dino Wieser =

Swiss professional ice hockey forward (born 1989)

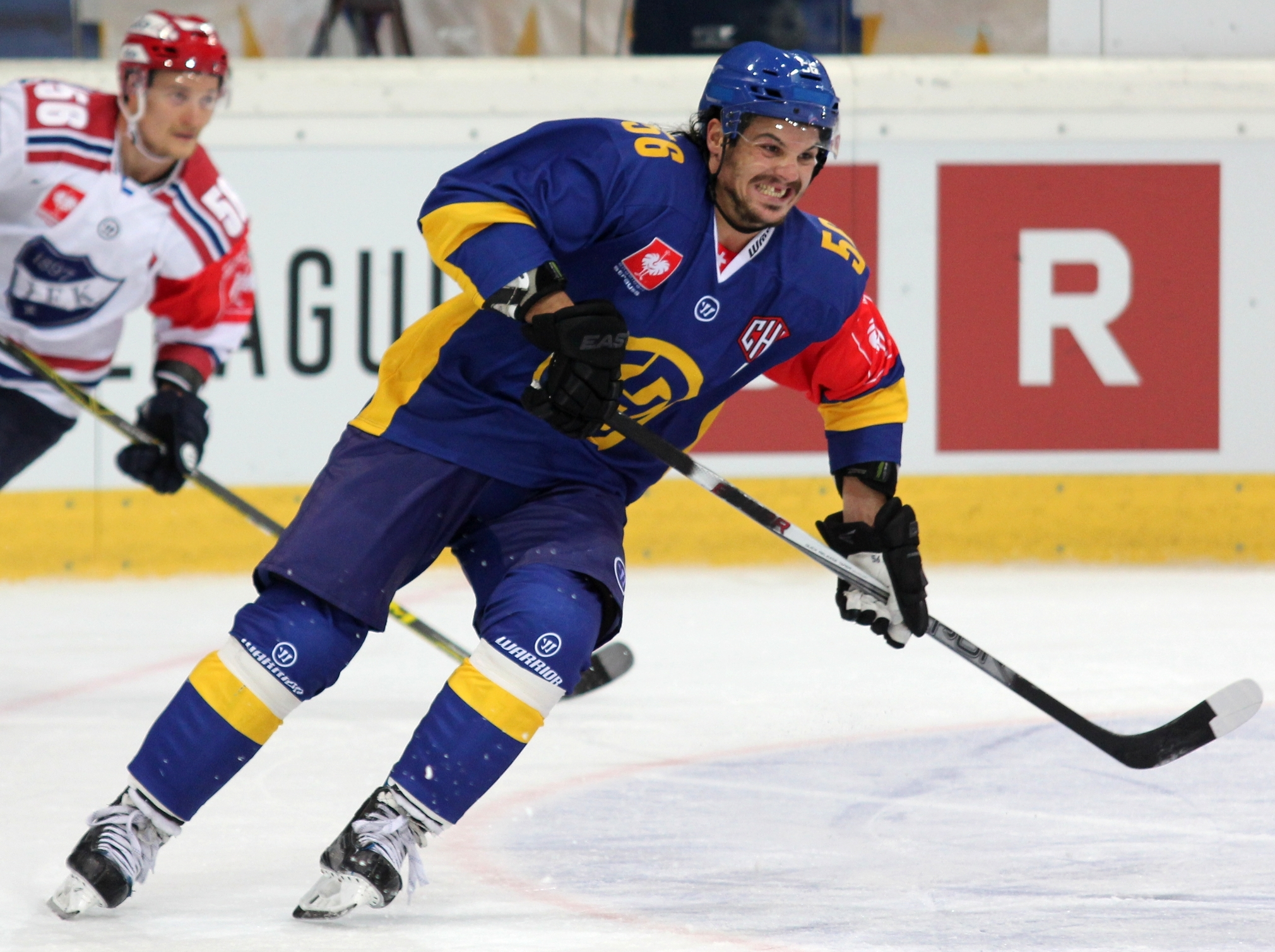
- Born: 13 June 1989 (age 36) Scuol, Switzerland
- Height: 5 ft 11 in (180 cm)
- Weight: 183 lb (83 kg; 13 st 1 lb)
- Position: Forward
- Shoots: Left
- NL team: HC Davos
- National team: Switzerland
- Playing career: 2005–present

Dino Wieser (born 13 June 1989) is a Swiss professional ice hockey forward who is currently playing for and is an alternate captain of HC Davos in the National League (NL).

== Playing career ==
On 18 March 2013 Wieser was signed to a three-year contract extension by Davos. On 20 October 2015 Wieser agreed to a three-year contract extension with HC Davos for a reported worth of CHF 1.8 million.

On 28 December 2018 Wieser agreed to an early four-year contract extension with HC Davos through the 2022–23 season.

== International play ==
Wieser was selected to play for the Swiss national team to participate in the 2015 IIHF World Championship.

== Personal ==
His brother Marc Wieser is also a professional hockey player.

== Career statistics ==
=== Regular season and playoffs ===
			Regular season					Playoffs
Season	Team	League	GP	G	A	Pts	PIM	GP	G	A	Pts	PIM
2005–06	HC Davos	NLA	7	0	0	0	2	—	—	—	—	—
2006–07	HC Davos	NLA	26	3	3	6	12	17	1	0	1	22
2007–08	HC Davos	NLA	44	7	5	12	36	12	1	0	1	14
2008–09	HC Davos	NLA	45	3	12	15	38	20	2	2	4	16
2009–10	HC Davos	NLA	40	8	5	13	30	4	0	0	0	4
2010–11	HC Davos	NLA	50	11	10	21	42	14	2	4	6	28
2011–12	HC Davos	NLA	30	10	5	15	30	4	0	1	1	6
2012–13	HC Davos	NLA	49	14	14	28	58	6	2	1	3	6
2013–14	HC Davos	NLA	45	15	11	26	30	6	0	1	1	32
2014–15	HC Davos	NLA	38	7	12	19	59	15	2	1	3	30
2015–16	HC Davos	NLA	43	9	20	29	63	9	2	3	5	18
2016–17	HC Davos	NLA	34	10	9	19	22	10	7	5	12	16
2017–18	HC Davos	NL	42	1	8	9	48	5	2	2	4	10
2018–19	HC Davos	NL	31	2	12	14	24	—	—	—	—	—
2019–20	HC Davos	NL	19	0	0	0	10	—	—	—	—	—
NL totals			543	100	126	226	504	122	21	20	41	202

=== International ===
Year	Team	Event	Result	GP	G	A	Pts	PIM
2008	Switzerland	WJC	9th	6	1	2	3	4
2015	Switzerland	WC	8th	8	0	0	0	2
2016	Switzerland	WC	11th	7	0	0	0	2
Junior totals				6	1	2	3	4
Senior totals				15	0	0	0	4
