= Mark Arcobello =

American ice hockey player (born 1988)

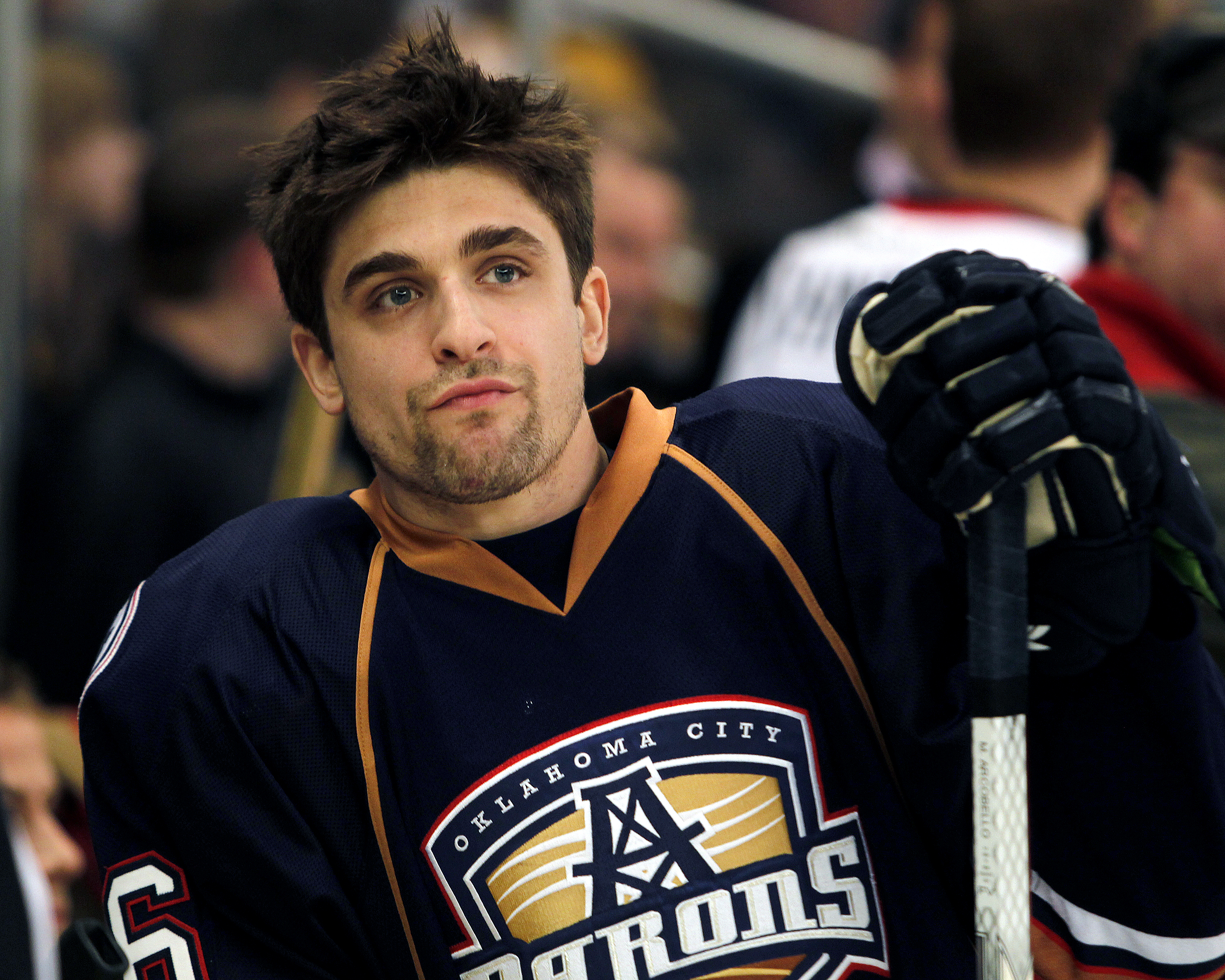
- Born: August 12, 1988 (age 38) Milford, Connecticut, U.S.
- Height: 5 ft 8 in (173 cm)
- Weight: 166 lb (75 kg; 11 st 12 lb)
- Position: Right wing
- Shoots: Right
- NL team Former teams: HC Lugano; Edmonton Oilers; Nashville Predators; Pittsburgh Penguins; Arizona Coyotes; Toronto Maple Leafs; SC Bern
- National team: United States
- NHL draft: Undrafted
- Playing career: 2010–present

Mark Robert Arcobello (born August 12, 1988) is an American professional ice hockey right winger who currently serves as captain of HC Lugano of the National League (NL).

== Playing career ==
=== Junior career ===
As a youth, Arcobello played in the 2002 Quebec International Pee-Wee Hockey Tournament with the New York Rangers minor ice hockey team. Arcobello played for Salisbury School, graduating in 2006, then played four years of college hockey at Yale University with the Yale Bulldogs men's ice hockey team. Undrafted after college, Arcobello played the 2010–11 season in minor league professional hockey with two affiliates of the Edmonton Oilers, the Stockton Thunder and the Oklahoma City Barons. The Oilers signed Arcobello to a two-year entry-level contract on April 1, 2011.

=== NHL career ===
Arcobello played his first National Hockey League (NHL) game during the 2012–13 NHL season, when he played a single game on February 5, 2013, following an injury to Oilers' captain Shawn Horcoff. On June 16, 2013, Arcobello signed a one-year contract extension with the Oilers.

During the 2014–15 season, on December 29, 2014, the Oilers traded Arcobello to the Nashville Predators in exchange for Derek Roy. Arcobello scored in his Predators debut against the Los Angeles Kings on January 3. However, after four games, Nashville placed him on waivers. The injury-depleted Pittsburgh Penguins claimed him on January 14, 2015. After 10 games, the Penguins placed him on waivers. The Arizona Coyotes claimed him on February 11, becoming his fourth NHL team of the season. Arcobello is the third player in NHL history, following Dennis O'Brien and Dave McLlwain, to play on four teams in a single season.

As the Coyotes did not tender Arcobello a qualifying offer, he became a free agent. On July 1, 2015, he joined his fifth team in under a year upon signing a one-year contract with the Toronto Maple Leafs. Arcabello joined the Maple Leafs for the first few games of the 2015–16 season, but after failing to record any points, he cleared waivers and was assigned to their minor league affiliate, the Toronto Marlies. He was called up to the injury-depleted Leafs in February 2016, scoring two goals in his first game back.

=== European career ===
Upon the conclusion of the 2015–16 season, he opted to continue his career overseas, putting pen to paper on a two-year deal with SC Bern of the National League (NL) in Switzerland. Arcobello made his NL debut on September 9, 2016, in the Berner derby against the SCL Tigers. He scored his first goal that same day after only 44 seconds into the first period. He then went on to add three assists in this game before 17,031 spectators in a packed PostFinance Arena. Arcobello finished the 2016–17 regular season as the league PostFinance Top Scorer with 25 goals and 30 assists in 50 regular season games while winning NL regular season MVP honors. He then led Bern to the 2017 NL title as the league's top scorer, tallying 20 points in 16 postseason contests. On May 9, 2017, with one year remaining on his contract, he agreed to a two-year contract extension with the Bears until the end of the 2019–20 season. In the following 2018–19 season, Arcobello won his second NL title with Bern.

In 2018, the NHL withdrew their contracted players from appearing at the 2018 Winter Olympics. Team USA sought out players from outside the NHL instead and Arcobello was among those chosen. Arcobello registered two points in five games as Team USA finished seventh overall in the tournament.

On October 10, 2019, Arcobello agreed to a three-year contract with HC Lugano worth CHF3 million, extending from the 2020–21 season through the 2022–23 season. On August 26, 2021, Arcobello was named captain of HC Lugano.

== Career statistics ==
=== Regular season and playoffs ===
			Regular season					Playoffs
Season	Team	League	GP	G	A	Pts	PIM	GP	G	A	Pts	PIM
2004–05	Fairfield College Preparatory School	HSCT
2005–06	Salisbury School	HS–Prep	28	26	21	47		—	—	—	—	—
2006–07	Yale University	ECAC	29	10	14	24	49	—	—	—	—	—
2007–08	Yale University	ECAC	34	7	14	21	40	—	—	—	—	—
2008–09	Yale University	ECAC	34	17	18	35	68	—	—	—	—	—
2009–10	Yale University	ECAC	34	15	21	36	46	—	—	—	—	—
2010–11	Stockton Thunder	ECHL	33	7	13	20	10	—	—	—	—	—
2010–11	Oklahoma City Barons	AHL	26	11	11	22	4	6	1	1	2	0
2011–12	Oklahoma City Barons	AHL	73	17	26	43	28	14	5	8	13	6
2012–13	Oklahoma City Barons	AHL	74	22	46	68	48	17	12	8	20	14
2012–13	Edmonton Oilers	NHL	1	0	0	0	0	—	—	—	—	—
2013–14	Edmonton Oilers	NHL	41	4	14	18	8	—	—	—	—	—
2013–14	Oklahoma City Barons	AHL	15	10	18	28	6	—	—	—	—	—
2014–15	Edmonton Oilers	NHL	36	7	5	12	12	—	—	—	—	—
2014–15	Nashville Predators	NHL	4	1	0	1	0	—	—	—	—	—
2014–15	Pittsburgh Penguins	NHL	10	0	2	2	2	—	—	—	—	—
2014–15	Arizona Coyotes	NHL	27	9	7	16	6	—	—	—	—	—
2015–16	Toronto Maple Leafs	NHL	20	3	1	4	0	—	—	—	—	—
2015–16	Toronto Marlies	AHL	49	25	34	59	22	15	2	9	11	2
2016–17	SC Bern	NLA	50	25	30	55	30	16	8	12	20	12
2017–18	SC Bern	NL	46	18	29	47	39	11	5	5	10	0
2018–19	SC Bern	NL	49	21	32	53	79	18	7	7	14	4
2019–20	SC Bern	NL	50	15	33	48	22	—	—	—	—	—
2020–21	HC Lugano	NL	52	13	35	48	58	5	1	4	5	20
2021–22	HC Lugano	NL	52	22	29	51	41	6	2	3	5	25
2022–23	HC Lugano	NL	46	11	16	27	18	2	0	1	1	7
2023–24	HC Lugano	NL	50	14	23	37	16	—	—	—	—	—
NHL totals			139	24	29	53	28	—	—	—	—	—
NL totals			345	125	204	329	287	58	23	32	55	68

=== International ===
Medal record

Representing United States

Ice hockey

World Championships
Bronze medal – third place	2015 Czech Republic	

Year	Team	Event	Result	GP	G	A	Pts	PIM
2015	United States	WC	3rd place, bronze medalist(s)	10	1	2	3	0
2018	United States	OG	7th	5	1	1	2	2
Senior totals				15	2	3	5	2

== Awards and honors ==
Award	Year
College
All-ECAC Hockey First Team	2008–09
AHCA East Second-Team All-American	2008–09
ECHL
All-Star Game MVP	2010–11
AHL
All-Star Game	2013
CCM/AHL Player of the Week	January 18–24, 2016
NL
MVP	2017
Best Forward	2017
Champion (SC Bern)	2017, 2019
