= PostFinance Top Scorer =

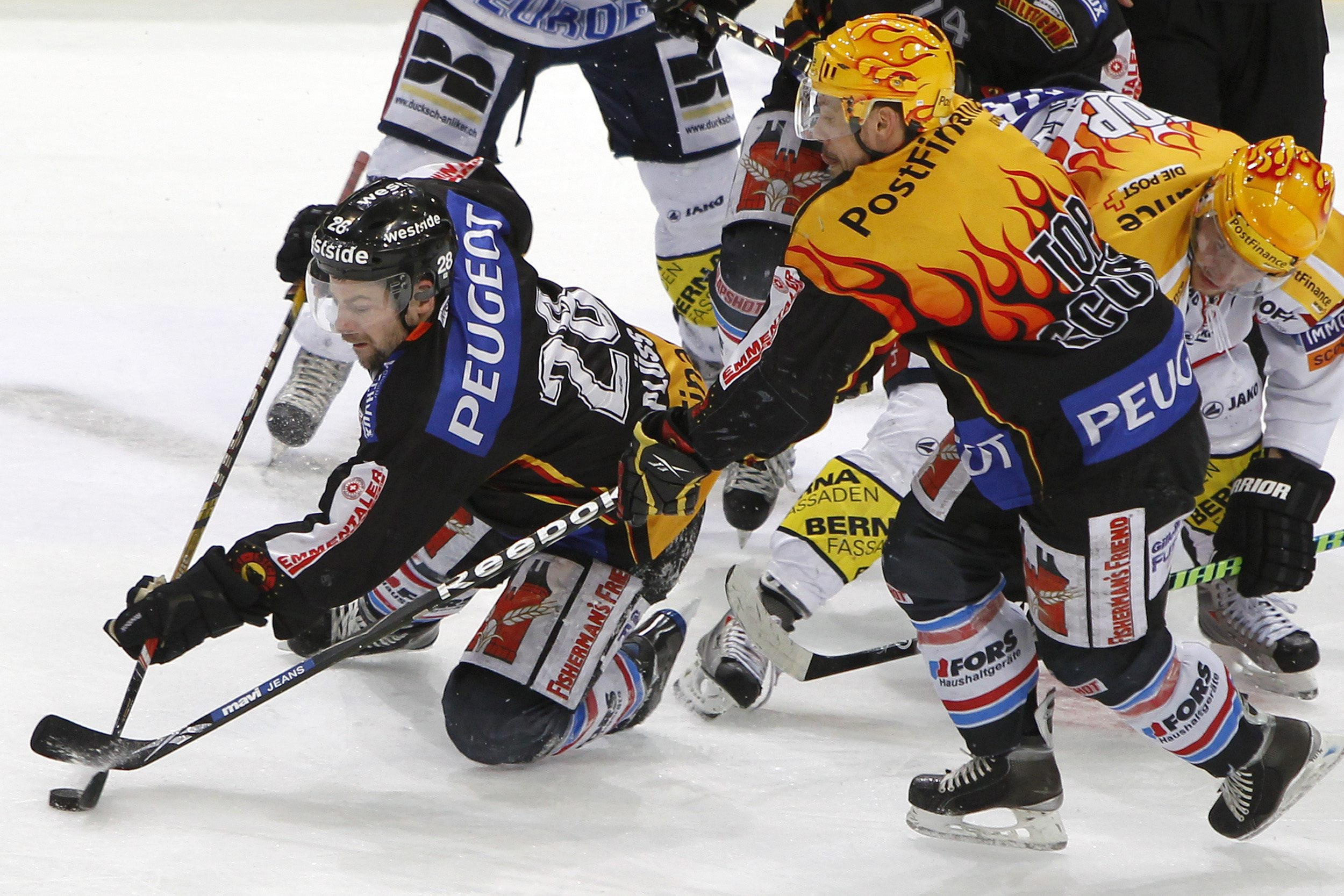
Ivo Rüthemann, PostFinance Top Scorer of SC Bern, 2009–10 Swiss champions.

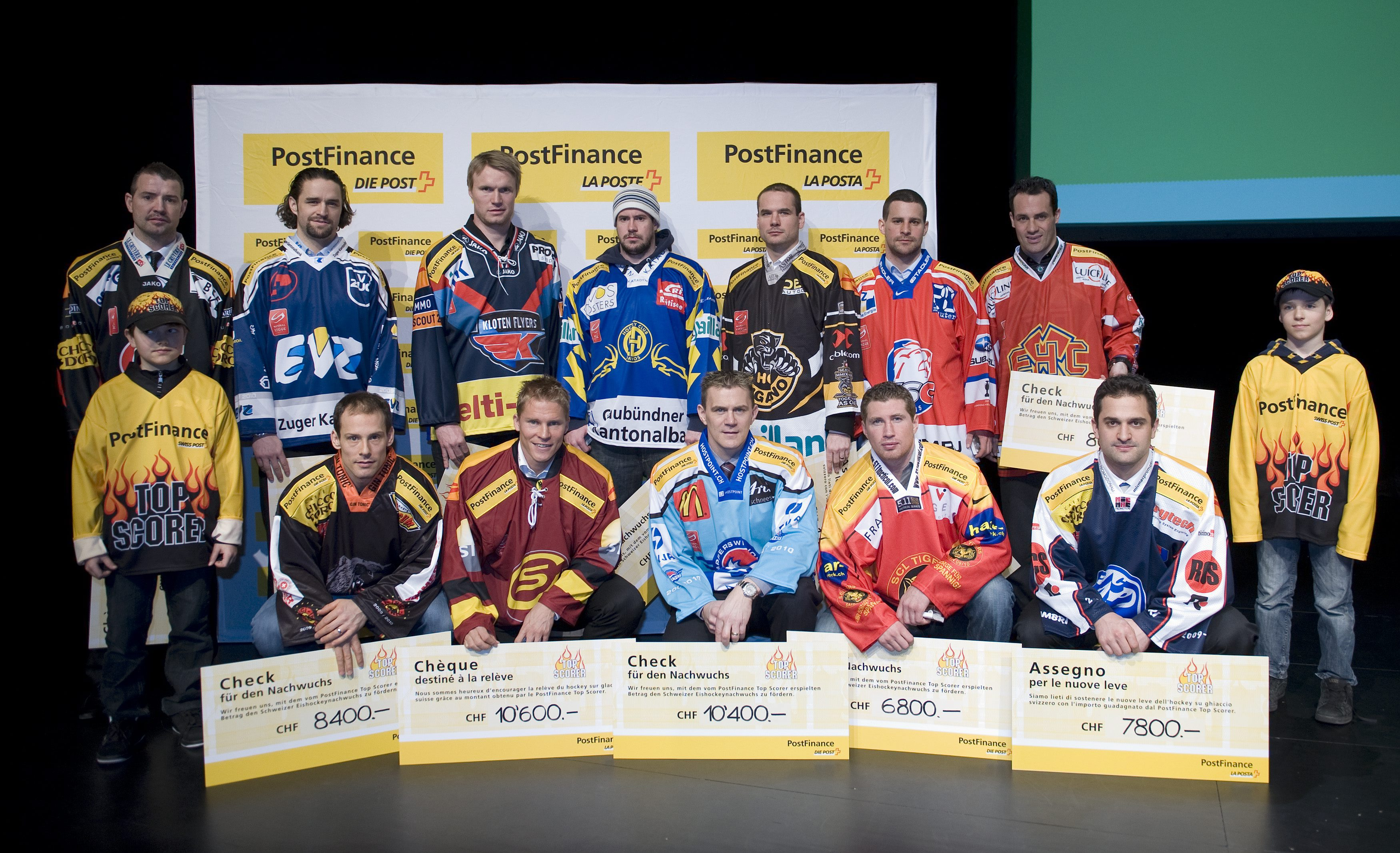
The 12 Top Scorers from the National League at the 2009–10 awards ceremony.

The PostFinance Top Scorer is awarded annually to the Swiss National League (NL) and Swiss League (SL) player who leads the league in points at the end of the regular season. The reigning Top Scorer from each team wears a yellow flame-emblazoned shirt and helmet in all playoff games. Once the qualifiers have taken place, the player with the most points in the league is then crowned the PostFinance Top Scorer of the NL or SL.

== History ==
The award was introduced in the 2002–03 season. PostFinance's, the award's sponsor, aim is to provide the next generation of Swiss ice hockey players with direct, sustainable support. For each Top Scorer point, the youth section of the respective club receives CHF 300 (NL) and CHF 100 (SL). PostFinance also awards the same amount to the Swiss Ice Hockey Federation for its youth teams. The PostFinance Top Scorer bonus payments are earmarked and must be used exclusively to support and train junior players.

== Winners ==
PostFinance Top Scorer
Season	Name	Team	Points	Winnings (CHF)
2002–03	Petteri Nummelin	HC Lugano	57	11,400
2003–04	Ville Peltonen	HC Lugano	72	14,400
2004–05	Randy Robitaille	ZSC Lions	67	13,400
2005–06	Glen Metropolit	HC Lugano	66	13,200
2006–07	Simon Gamache	SC Bern	66	13,200
2007–08	Erik Westrum	HC Ambrì-Piotta	72	14,400
2008–09	Juraj Kolník	Genève-Servette HC	72	14,400
2009–10	Randy Robitaille (2)	HC Lugano	65	13,000
2010–11	Glen Metropolit	EV Zug	53	10,600
2011–12	Damien Brunner	EV Zug	60	12,000
2012–13	Linus Omark	EV Zug	69	13,800
2013–14	Matthew Lombardi	Genève-Servette HC	50	10,000
2014–15	Fredrik Pettersson	HC Lugano	69	13,800
2015–16	Pierre-Marc Bouchard	EV Zug	67	13,400
2016–17	Mark Arcobello	SC Bern	55	11,000
2017–18	Dustin Jeffrey	Lausanne HC	57	11,400
2018–19	Dominik Kubalík	HC Ambrì-Piotta	57	11,400
2019–20	Pius Suter	ZSC Lions	53	10,600
2020–21	Jan Kovář	EV Zug	63	18,900
2021–22	Roman Červenka	SC Rapperswil-Jona Lakers	64	19,200
2022–23	Roman Červenka	SC Rapperswil-Jona Lakers	59	17,700
2023–24	Marcus Sörensen	Fribourg-Gottéron	63	18,900
2024–25	Austin Czarnik	SC Bern	56	16,800
2025–26	Markus Granlund	Genève-Servette HC	54	16,200
