= Basler Kantonalbank =

Coordinates: 47.5527°N 7.5934°E

- Type: Public-law institution
- Traded as: SIX: BSKP
- ISIN: CH0009236461
- Industry: financial service activities, except insurance and pension funding
- Founded: 1899
- Headquarters: BKB building Aeschenvorstadt, Switzerland
- Services: Banking
- Operating income: 281,1 mln CHF (2025)
- Total assets: 54952 mln CHF (2025)
- Number of employees: 1443 (2025)
- Website: bkb.ch

Basler Kantonalbank (Basel Cantonal Bank) is a Swiss cantonal bank, one of the 24 cantonal banks serving Switzerland's 26 cantons, founded in 1899. In 2019, Basler Kantonalbank had 15 branches with 842 total employees; the total assets of the bank were CHF 27.305 billion. Basler Kantonalbank has a full state guarantee of its liabilities.

== History ==
Since 1999, it has had a majority ownership of Bank Cler (formerly Coop Bank).

In October 2012 the bank's CEO, Hans Rudolf Matter, resigned after 620 clients lost more than CHF 100 million in a scandal involving ASE investments. Eventually the number of affected clients grew to about 1,500.

In 2013, Chairman Andreas Albrecht was forced to resign following the Swiss Financial Market Supervisory Authority (FINMA)'s decree that the bank had rigged sales of its own participation certificates. On 21 November 2013, BKB was ordered to pay back CHF 2.6 million ($2.9 million) that had been earned through these improper sales.

In 2023, Basler Kantonalbank joined the Asset Management Association Switzerland (Amas), becoming the eighth cantonal bank to support the initiative.

== Organization ==
The highest governing body of Basler Kantonalbank is the Bank Council. This council has 9 members, with Adrian Bult as the current president. Operational responsibility lies with the executive Board, which has six members and is currently headed by Regula Berger (Chief Executive Officer).

== See also ==
- Cantonal bank
- List of banks in Switzerland
