= Participation certificate =

A Participation certificate (PC) is a special form of participation in Swiss stock corporations (Partizipationsschein). Although this security secures property rights in the issuing company, the participation certificate does not confer any membership or voting rights. The issue of this special financing tool is intended to provide the company with equity capital. By not having voting rights, the company also protects itself against unintended influences from unwanted shareholders. After all, these shareholders have no voting rights and thus only limited or no influence at all on the company's policy.

The meaning of a "Participation Certificate" in Switzerland is different from the similar term used in English. In English, a Certificate of Participation is a financial instrument, a form of financing, used by municipal or government entities which allows an individual to buy a share of the lease revenue of an agreement made by these entities. It is different from a bond issued by these agencies since participation certificates are secured by lease revenues. Municipal and government entities use this instrument to circumvent restrictions that might exist on the amount of debt in other forms they able to take on.

Certificates of Participation are also a new form of credit instrument whereby banks can raise funds from other banks and other central bank approved financial institutions to ease liquidity. In this case banks have the option to share their credit asset(s) with other banks by issuing participation certificates. With this participation approach, banks and financial institutions come together either on risk sharing or non-risk sharing basis. While providing short term funds, participation certificates can also be used to reduce risk. The rate at which these certificates can be issued will be negotiable depending on the interest rate scenario.
