= Bank Cler =

Swiss bank

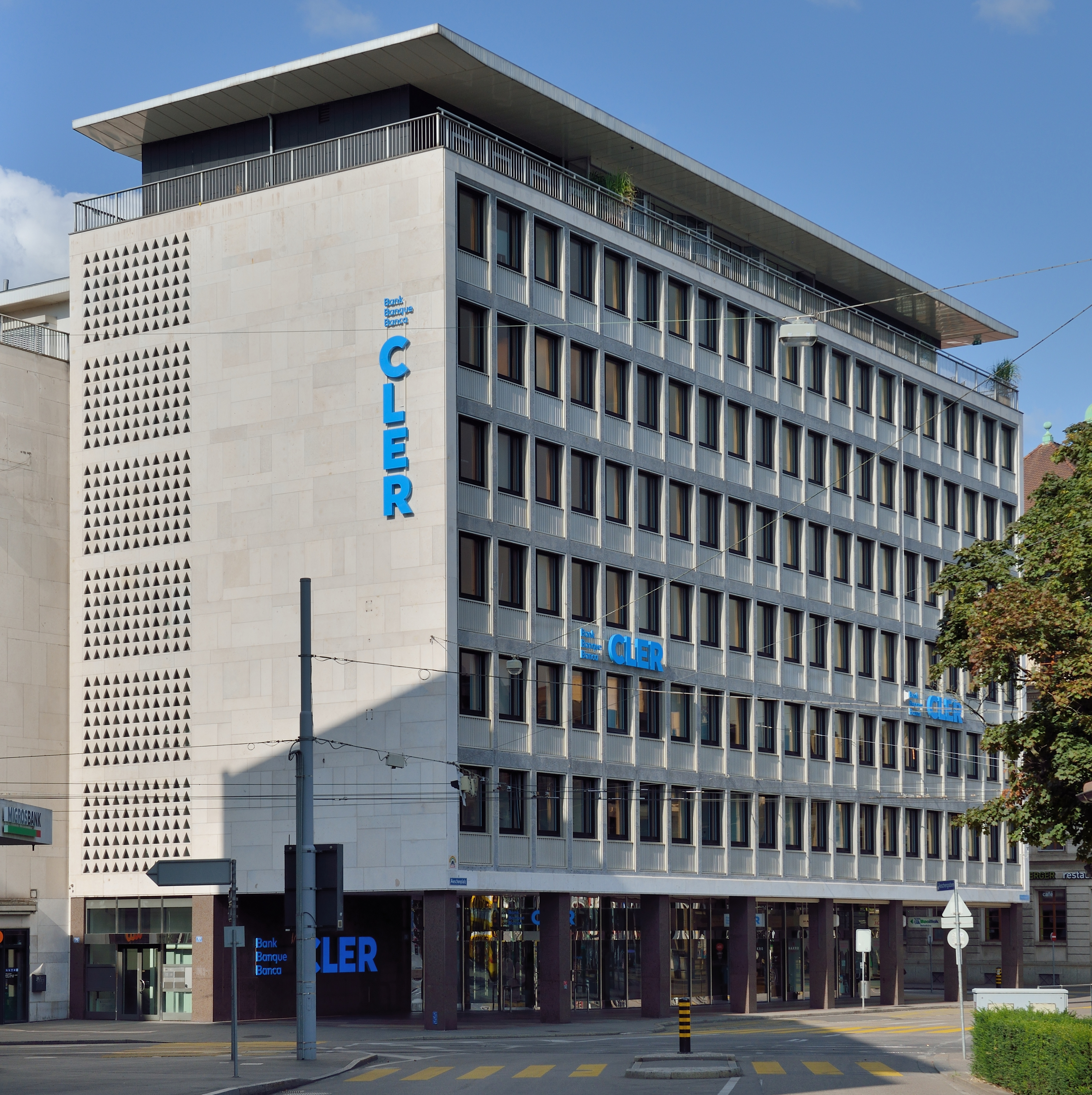
- Head Office of Bank Cler in Basel
- Native name: (in German) Bank Cler (in French) Banque Cler (in Italian) Banca Cler
- Formerly: Coop Banque, Banque Centrale Coopérative, Banque des coopératives et des syndicats
- Industry: Banking
- Founded: 1927; 99 years ago
- Founder: Gottlieb Duttweiler
- Headquarters: Basel, Switzerland
- Owner: Basler Kantonalbank
- Rating: Standard & Poor's: A
- Website: cler.ch

Bank Cler is a Basel-based Swiss bank founded in 1927. The bank's main area of activity is retail banking for private individuals and small and medium-sized companies. Until it became a wholly owned subsidiary of Basler Kantonalbank in 2019 the bank's shares were listed on the SIX Swiss Exchange.

== History ==
Today's Bank Cler was founded on 30 October 1927 by the Association of Swiss Consumers (today Coop) together with the Swiss Federation of Trade Unions as a cooperative central bank – Genossenschaftliche Zentralbank (French: Banque Centrale Coopérative; Italian: Banca Centrale Cooperativa). In 1970, the delegates' meeting of the members of the cooperative decided to transform the company into a stock corporation.

In 1995 the bank's name was changed to Coop Bank. On 20 December 1999, the Basler Kantonalbank purchased a controlling stake in the bank, and in 2001, the name was changed to Bank Coop. As of the end of 2009, the Basler Kantonalbank held a 57.6% share of the bank's stock; a further 10.4% was held by the former parent company – Coop, 5.1% by Swiss trade union associations and 1.1% by the bank in its trading portfolio and in financial investments. The rest of the stock was in free float.

In March 2017, Coop sold its remaining shares to the Basler Kantonalbank. On 20 May 2017, the institution undertook a comprehensive rebranding and became Bank Cler (Banque Cler; Banca Cler), Romansh for "transparent, simple, clear".

On 20 June 2018, the Basler Kantonalbank announced that it wanted to take over 100% of Bank Cler. In October 2018, Cler was certified as climate neutral. In November 2018, SIX approved the delisting of the bank's shares. Payment transactions were outsourced to Swisscom as of September 2019.

== Criticism of the former bank Coop ==
=== Incorrect sending of customer statements ===
In 2013 some customers annual statements were sent to incorrect addresses due to a program error. Due to errors in the introduction of a new bank statement format, statements from 43,000 customers were enclosed with other addressees, resultantly 31,000 customers received annual statements for both themselves and for other people. In June 2014, Bank Coop announced that an independent investigation undertaken by Deloitte concluded that a chain of unfavourable circumstances and inadequate controls led to the error.

=== Price manipulation ===
In October 2014, Bank Coop was reprimanded by the Swiss Financial Market Supervisory Authority (FINMA) for manipulating the price of its own bearer shares between 2009 and 2013. FINMA uncovered "substantial support purchases" by Bank Coop to counteract a decline in the bank's share price. In doing so, the bank seriously violated the supervisory prohibition of market manipulation and its guarantee as well as its organisational obligations. FINMA issued a three-year professional ban against the former CEO, Andreas Waespi, who left the bank at the beginning of August 2014.

== See also ==
- Banking in Switzerland
- List of banks in Switzerland
