= 2016–17 NLA season =

2016–17 National League A season
- League: National League A
- Sport: Ice hockey
- Duration: September 7, 2016 – February 25, 2017
- Games: 50
- Teams: 12
- Total attendance: 2,064,737 (6,882 per game)

Regular season
- Best record: SC Bern
- Runners-up: ZSC Lions
- Season MVP: Mark Arcobello (SC Bern)
- Top scorer: Mark Arcobello (SC Bern)

Playoffs
- Semi-Final champions: SC Bern
- Semi-Final runners-up: HC Lugano
- Semi-Final champions: EV Zug
- Semi-Final runners-up: HC Davos

Swiss champion NLA
- Champions: SC Bern
- Runners-up: EV Zug

NLA seasons
- ← 2015–16 2017–18 →

The 2016–17 National League A season was the tenth ice hockey season of Switzerland's top hockey league, the National League A. Overall, it was the 79th season of Swiss professional hockey.

SC Bern went on to win its 15th NLA title as the defending champions by defeating EV Zug. It was the first time since the 2000–01 season when the defending champions (ZSC Lions) won back-to-back titles.

== Teams ==
NLA teams for the 2016–17 season

Team	City	Arena	Capacity
HC Ambrì-Piotta	Ambrì	Valascia	6,500
SC Bern	Bern	PostFinance-Arena	17,031
EHC Biel	Biel/Bienne	Tissot Arena	6,521
HC Davos	Davos	Vaillant Arena	6,800
Fribourg-Gottéron	Fribourg	BCF Arena	6,500
Genève-Servette HC	Geneva	Patinoire des Vernets	7,135
EHC Kloten	Kloten	Swiss Arena	7,719
Lausanne HC	Lausanne	CIG de Malley	7,600
HC Lugano	Lugano	Pista La Resega	7,800
SCL Tigers	Langnau im Emmental	Ilfis Stadium	6,000
ZSC Lions	Zürich	Hallenstadion	11,200
EV Zug	Zug	Bossard Arena	7,015

== Coaching changes ==
On September 22, 2016, Fribourg-Gottéron's Gerd Zenhäusern was relieved of his duties of head coach after posting a 1-1-1-3 record through 6 games this season. It was later announced that Larry Huras would take over the job for the remainder of the season.

On October 1, 2016, the SCL Tigers fired head coach Scott Beattie after posting a 1-0-2-7 record through 10 games this season. He eventually went on to coach his final game that same day against EHC Kloten, which Langnau won 5-3. On October 2, 2016, it was announced that Heinz Ehlers would be Langnau's new head coach for the remainder of the season and through the 2017–18 season should the team stay in the NLA.

On November 14, 2016, EHC Biel fired head coach Kevin Schlaepfer after posting an 8-0-2-11 record through 21 games this season. Mike McNamara who was coaching Biel junior team at the time, became the interim head coach for the main club.

On January 16, 2017, HC Lugano fired head coach Doug Shedden and assistant coach Pat Curcio after posting a 14-4-3-19 record through 40 games this season. It was later announced that Greg Ireland would replace Shedden at the helm of the team for the end of the season.

On January 30, 2017, HC Ambrì-Piotta parted ways with head coach Hans Kossmann after posting a 7-8-4-24 record through 43 games this season, sitting last in the NLA at the time. Gordie Dwyer will coach the team for the remainder of the season.

== Arenas ==
Lausanne played its final season at Malley before playing two seasons in a temporary arena which will be located in the old city's slaughterhouse. Meanwhile, their new 10,000-seat arena will be built on the site of the old Malley.

This was Fribourg's last season in the current BCF Arena before it undergoes major renovations in the spring of 2017, which will last for about two years and increase the capacity from 6,500 to 8,500. The team should still be able to play in the arena during the renovations.

== Regular season ==
Pos	Team	Pld	W	OTW	OTL	L	GF	GA	GD	Pts	Qualification
1	SC Bern	50	31	6	4	9	160	114	+46	109	Advance to Playoffs
2	ZSC Lions	50	26	9	8	7	166	115	+51	104	Advance to Playoffs
3	EV Zug	50	28	3	6	13	153	122	+31	96	Advance to Playoffs
4	Lausanne HC	50	23	5	1	21	154	139	+15	80	Advance to Playoffs
5	HC Davos	50	22	4	4	20	152	135	+17	78	Advance to Playoffs
6	Genève-Servette HC	50	18	4	11	17	135	140	−5	73	Advance to Playoffs
7	HC Lugano	50	19	6	4	21	142	155	−13	73	Advance to Playoffs
8	EHC Biel	50	21	2	3	24	146	140	+6	70	Advance to Playoffs
9	EHC Kloten	50	14	5	10	21	142	162	−20	62	Advance to Playouts (Note: Relegation Playoffs)
10	SCL Tigers	50	16	4	3	27	124	154	−30	59	Advance to Playouts
11	Fribourg-Gottéron	50	12	5	2	31	130	177	−47	48	Advance to Playouts
12	HC Ambrì-Piotta	50	9	8	5	28	113	164	−51	48	Advance to Playouts

Updated to match(es) played on 25 February 2017. Source: NLA
Rules for classification: 1) points; 2) a higher number of wins in the regular time; 3) a higher number of wins in overtime and shootouts; 4) goal difference; 5) number of goals scored; 6) drawing of lots.

== Player statistics ==
=== Regular season ===
Player	Team	GP	G	A	Pts	+/–	PIM
Mark Arcobello	SC Bern	50	25	30	55	+23	30
Julien Sprunger	HC Fribourg-Gottéron	50	26	25	51	-2	16
Roman Červenka	HC Fribourg-Gottéron	44	16	35	51	-8	32
Robert Nilsson	ZSC Lions	46	14	37	51	+30	14
Lino Martschini	EV Zug	50	23	26	49	+8	6
Drew Shore	EHC Kloten	50	24	24	48	-1	28
Linus Klasen	HC Lugano	50	11	37	48	-11	30
David McIntyre	EV Zug	47	17	30	47	+19	34
Dustin Jeffrey	Lausanne HC	49	18	28	46	+9	8
Patrick Thoresen	ZSC Lions	50	18	27	45	+30	36

=== Playoffs ===
Player	Team	GP	G	A	Pts	+/–	PIM
Mark Arcobello	SC Bern	16	8	12	20	+2	12
Andrew Ebbett	SC Bern	16	8	12	20	+9	8
David McIntyre	EV Zug	16	11	8	19	+1	12
Thomas Rüfenacht	SC Bern	16	7	11	18	+4	49
Raphael Diaz	EV Zug	16	5	9	14	0	6
Ryan Lasch	SC Bern	16	4	9	13	+9	2
Dino Wieser	HC Davos	10	7	5	12	+3	16
Simon Moser	SC Bern	16	4	8	12	+3	33
Ramon Untersander	SC Bern	16	5	6	11	+6	2
Jarkko Immonen	EV Zug	15	4	7	11	-4	41

== Playoffs ==
Quarter-Finals
1	SC Bern	4
8	EHC Biel	1
2	ZSC Lions	2
7	HC Lugano	4
(Pairings are reseeded after the first round)
3	EV Zug	4
6	Genève-Servette HC	0
4	Lausanne HC	0
5	HC Davos	4

Semi-Finals
1	SC Bern	4
7	HC Lugano	1
3	EV Zug	4
5	HC Davos	2

Finals
1	SC Bern	4
3	EV Zug	2
