= Ottoman Bank =

Former bank in the Ottoman Empire, then Turkey

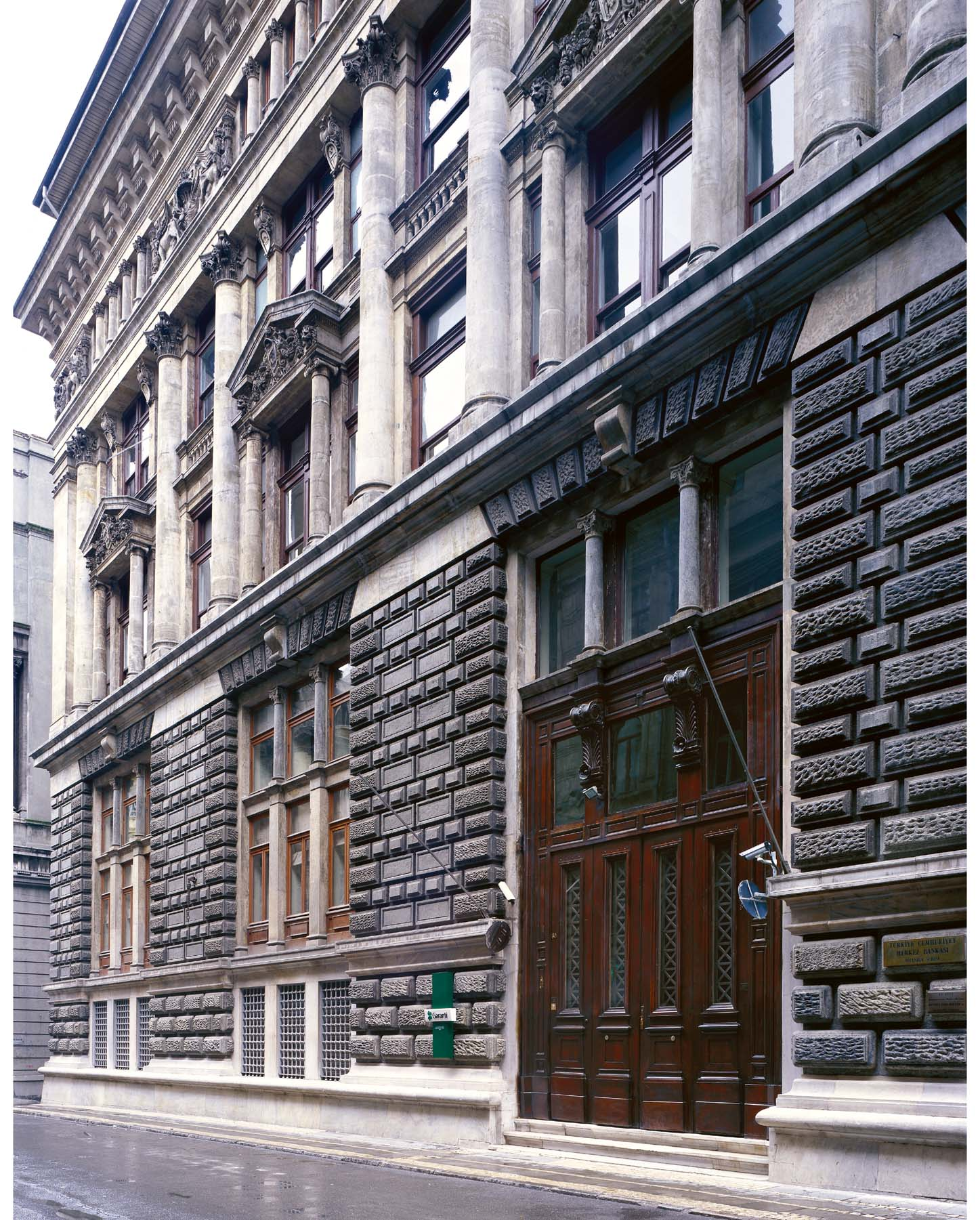
Bankalar Caddesi 11, the bank's headquarters in Constantinople (Istanbul) from 1892 to 1999

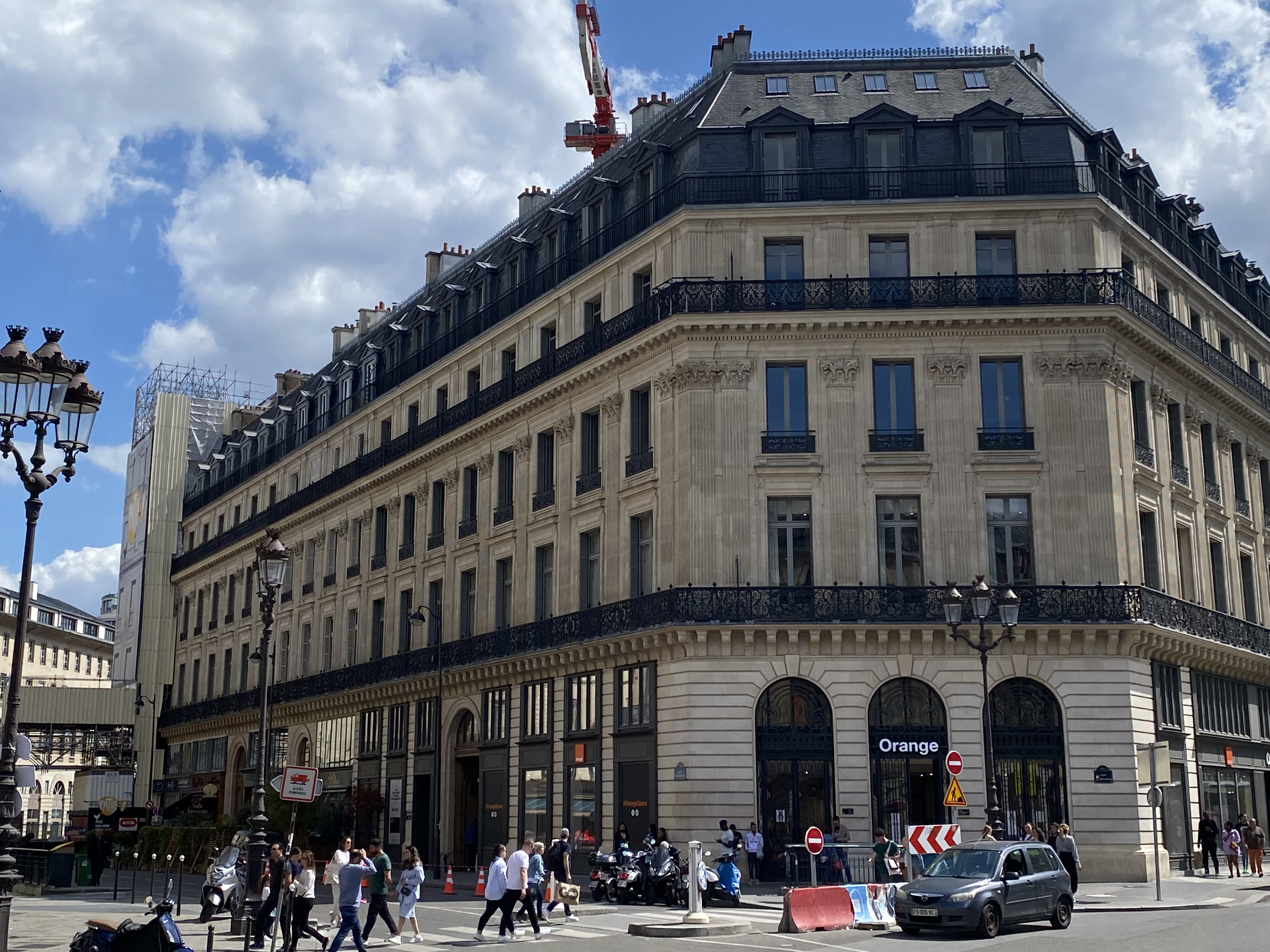
7, rue Meyerbeer, the bank's Paris office from 1870 to 1975

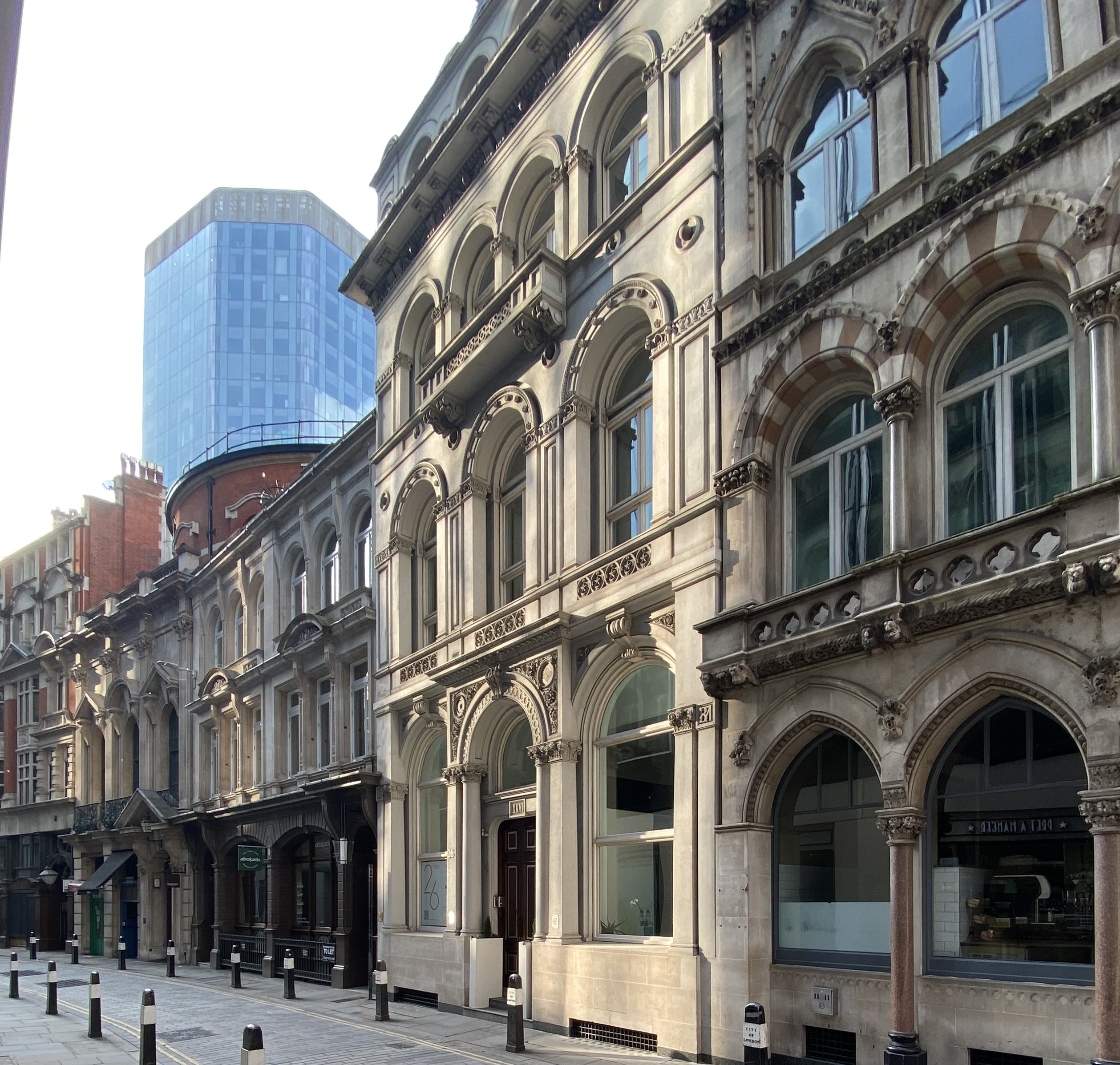
26 Throgmorton Street (center), designed by architect William Burnet, the London seat of the Ottoman Bank from 1872 to 1947

The Ottoman Bank (Turkish: Osmanlı Bankası), known from 1863 to 1925 as the Imperial Ottoman Bank (French: Banque Impériale Ottomane, Ottoman Turkish: بانق عثمانی شاهانه) and correspondingly referred to by its French acronym BIO, was a bank that played a major role in the financial history of the Ottoman Empire. By the early 20th century, it was the dominant bank in the Ottoman Empire, and one of the largest in the world.

It was founded in 1856 as a British institution chartered in London, and reorganized in 1863 as a French–British venture with head office in Constantinople, on a principle of strict equality between British and French stakeholders. It soon became dominated by French interests, however, primarily because of the greater success of its offerings among French savers than British ones. In its early years, the BIO was principally a lender to the Ottoman government with a monopoly on banknote issuance and other public-interest roles, including all treasury operations of the Ottoman state under an agreement ratified in February 1875 that was however never fully implemented. In the 1890s, it pivoted to a greater emphasis on commercial and investment banking, which it developed with lasting success despite a serious crisis in 1895.

Following World War I, the Banque de Paris et des Pays-Bas (known since the 1980s as Paribas) took control of the BIO, and renamed it Ottoman Bank in 1925. The bank's remaining public-interest privileges and monopolies were phased out. Its operations outside Turkey were gradually dismantled, a process that was completed in 1975. The Ottoman Bank became Turkish-owned when Garanti Bank purchased it from Paribas in 1996, and was eventually subsumed in 2001 into the Garanti Bank operations and corporate identity, in turn rebranded Garanti BBVA in 2019.

== Name ==
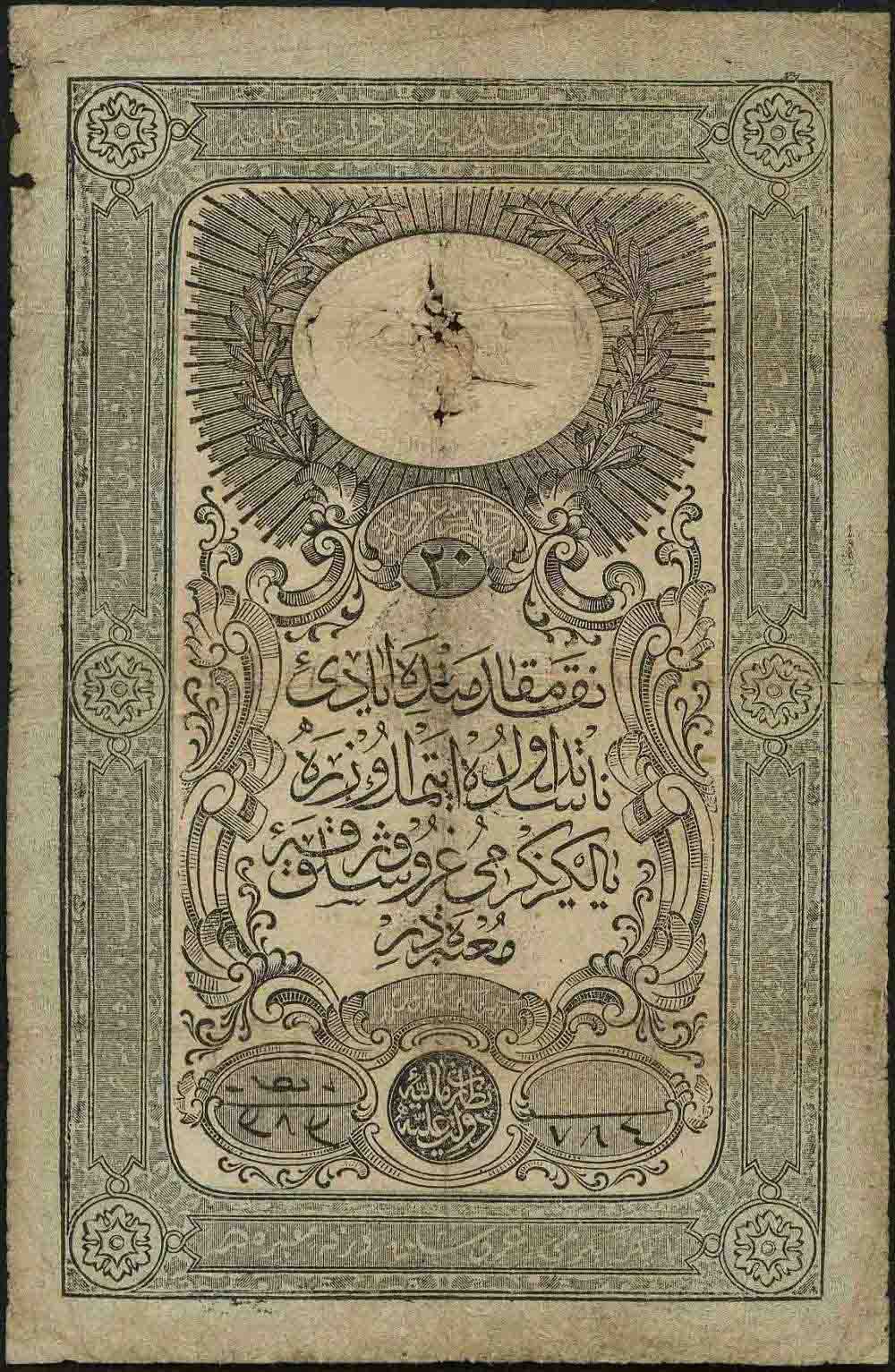
Paper money of the Ottoman Empire (kaime), 1852

During its heyday between 1863 and 1925 the bank was generally referred to using its French name, banque impériale ottomane (BIO), even in English-speaking contexts. This was because French was the international language of the era and especially prominent in the business community among the many languages of the Ottoman Empire. In Turkey after 1925, the bank increasingly operated under its Turkish name Osmanlı Bankası.

== Background ==
The Ottoman Empire had traditionally relied on credit from individual financiers known as sarraf, which included not only Muslims but also Armenians, Greeks, Jews, and Levantines (long-established, mostly Catholic or Jewish families of western European descent). In the early 19th century, prominent sarraf families had coalesced into a community mainly based in the Galata neighborhood of Constantinople, known as the Galata bankers which operated as family businesses. The first formal banking establishment that was not strictly family-controlled was a joint venture between the Ottoman state and two prominent Levantine Galata bankers, Jacques Alléon and Theodore Baltazzi, which took the name of Banque de Constantinople in 1847 but was wound up in 1852. Another project, proposed as the Banque Nationale de Turquie by French entrepreneur Ariste Jacques Trouvé-Chauvel, was considered by the Ottoman government in 1853 but not implemented.

During the Crimean War that started in October 1853, France and Great Britain were allied in support of the Ottoman Empire. In 1855, the two nations sent a joint mission to assess Ottoman finances, led by Alexandre de Plœuc for France and Augustus Edward Hobart-Hampden for the UK, who would later become respectively the first and second General Managers of the Imperial Ottoman Bank in Constantinople.

== London-based Ottoman Bank (1856–1863) ==
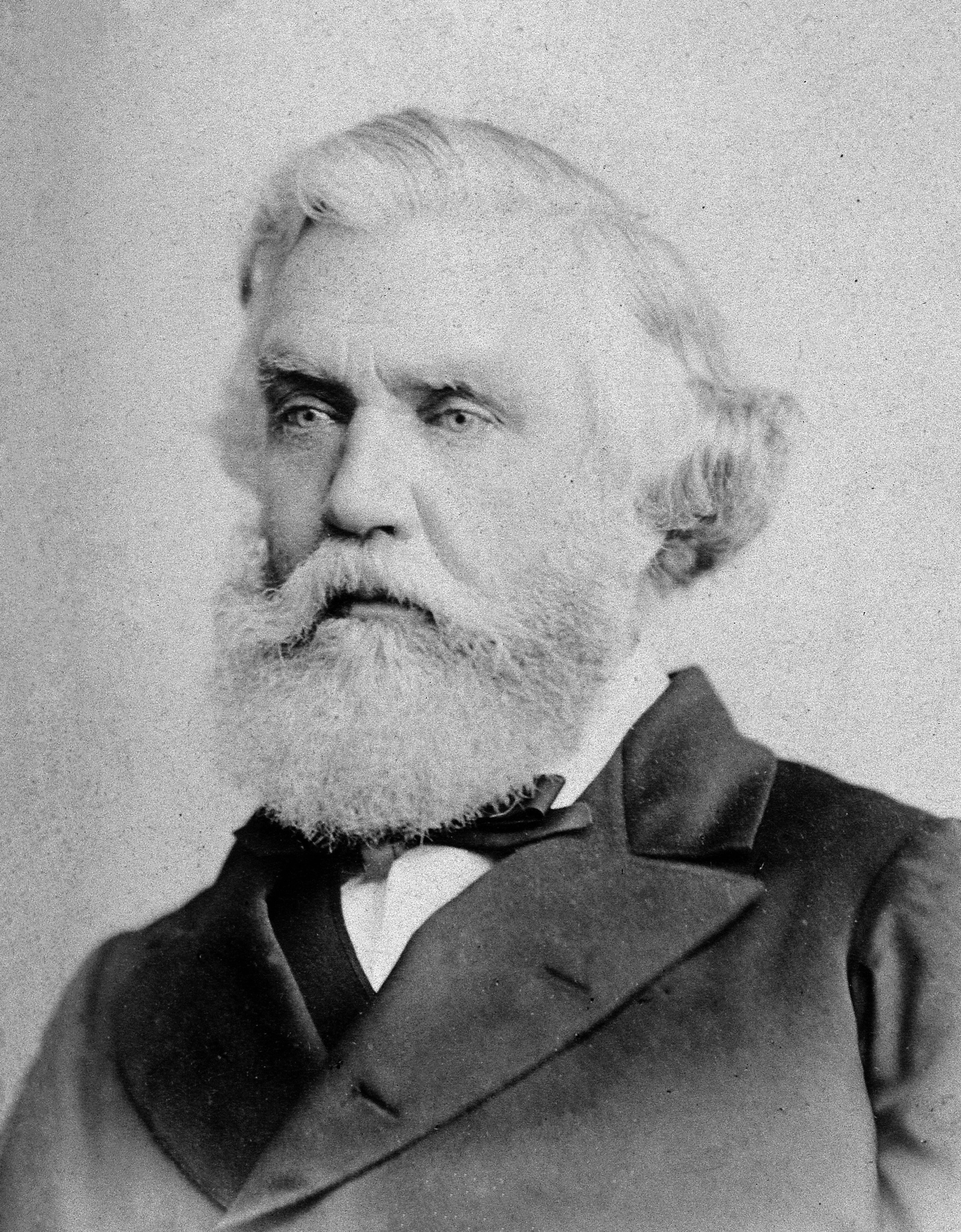
Austen Henry Layard (1817–1894) was instrumental in the establishment of the Ottoman Bank in London

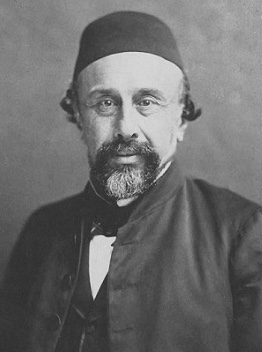
Mehmed Fuad Pasha (1814–1869), a principal Ottoman promoter of the bank's creation

In early 1856, Sultan Abdulmejid I called for modern banks to be created in the Empire to improve its financial system and foster economic development. Three main projects emerged in response, respectively promoted by the Rothschild family (in London, Paris and Vienna), the Pereire brothers (in Paris), and a group of British financiers around Austen Henry Layard and the private bank Glyn, Mills & Co. The Ottoman government opted for the latter, which it identified as better preserving the country's independence from western financiers in comparison with the assertive approaches of the Rothschilds and Pereires. The British project was initially conceived by two businessmen, Peter Pasquali et Stephen Sleight, who had participated earlier in 1856 in the creation of the Bank of Egypt, the first Egyptian joint-stock bank. The project benefited from the support of such influential diplomats as George Villiers, 4th Earl of Clarendon and Stratford Canning, 1st Viscount Stratford de Redcliffe, in contrast to the Pereire initiative that was not much supported by French ambassador Édouard Thouvenel. As was customary at the time for an enterprise that would operate abroad, the British authorities sought approval from the Ottoman government, and once that was confirmed in April 1856, the bank was chartered on 24 May 1856 as an English entity with seat at 26, Old Broad Street in London. The group of financiers that supported it also included Thomas Charles Bruce, William Richard Drake, Pascoe Du Pré Grenfell, Lachlan Mackintosh Rate, and John Stewart.

The Ottoman Bank then sought an issuance privilege from the Ottoman government, but the latter temporized as it preferred a solution that would combine British and French stakeholders, mirroring the Crimean War coalition. As high-ranking official Mehmed Fuad Pasha put it in May 1856 to French Ambassador Thouvenel, the Sublime Porte's wish "was to perpetuate as much as possible the spirit of alliance that saved Turkey during the war, namely providing equal shares to French and English interests." Even as the Ottoman Bank started its operations and opened its first branches, Layard soon understood that a different scheme would be needed to secure the issuance privilege. In a communication to Grand Vizier Mustafa Reşid Pasha in December 1856, he outlined what would eventually be the concept of the still-to-come BIO: a head office in Constantinople, but governance by two parallel committees in London and Paris that would be accountable to the British and French shareholders. Contrary to the desires of the Ottoman authorities, however, Layard insisted that they should not control the bank's management, only conceding a "supervisor" role for a high-ranking Ottoman official. In contrast to Layard, a competing British investor group led by Joseph Paxton presented a project to establish a "Bank of Turkey" with a Governor and Vice Governor who would be both appointed by the Sublime Porte. Paxton's project was endorsed by the Ottoman government in March 1857 but, as Layard had anticipated, it failed to raise investor interest in London. A follow-up effort by some of Paxton's associates under the same name of "Bank of Turkey" started operations in 1858, but had to be placed into liquidation in 1861.

Without the issuance privilege, the Ottoman Bank had modest beginnings with six staff in Constantinople (12 in 1858) and four in Smyrna as well as a branch office in Khan Antoun Bey, then the main building in the Beirut Souks. It also had a branch in Galaţi in Moldavia, complemented by Bucharest in Wallachia from 1861. The bank made some poor credit allocation decisions, suffered from the 1860 civil conflict in Mount Lebanon and a financial crisis in 1861, and met hostility from the Galata bankers.

== Early development as quasi-state bank (1863–1881) ==
=== Establishment of the Imperial Ottoman Bank ===
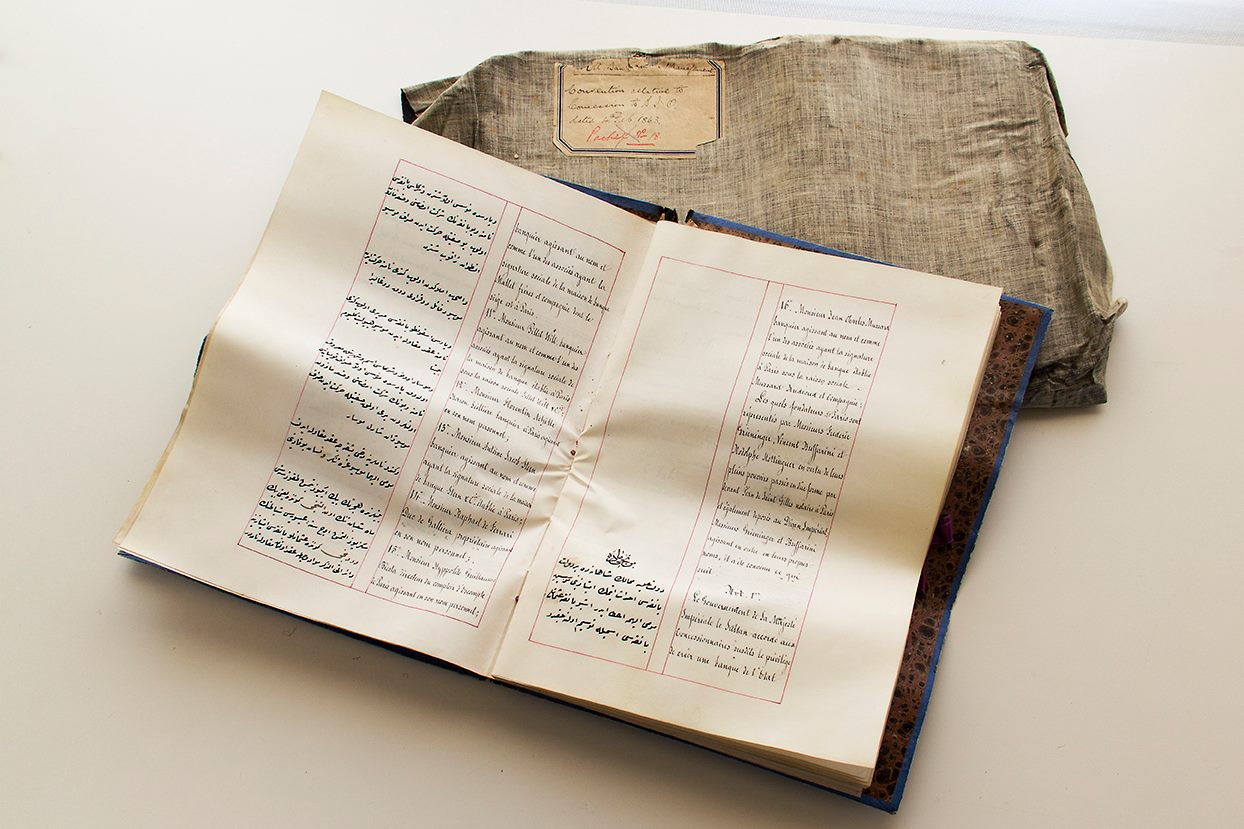
Firman of concession of the Imperial Ottoman Bank, February 4, 1863. (22175414171)

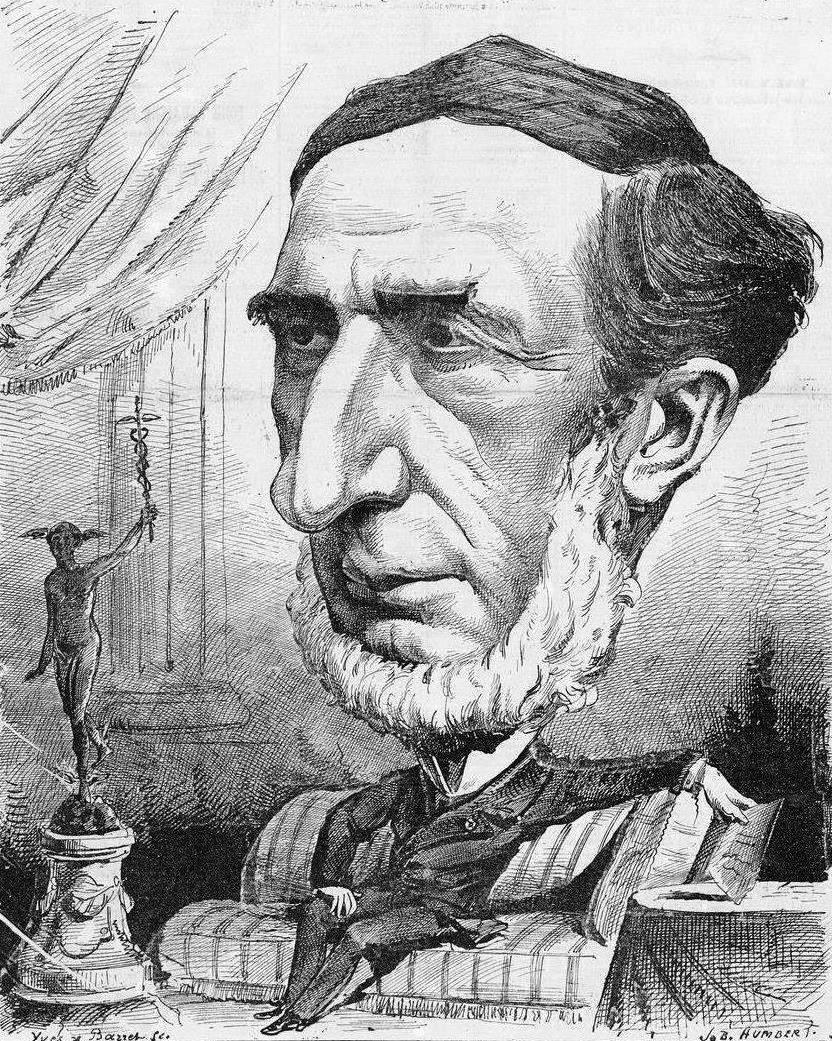
Alexandre de Ploeuc, first general manager of the BIO (cartoon of 1873)

By early 1862, circumstances favored the reconsideration of the Ottoman Bank project. Foreign investors had grown more confident about the reforming intent of the Porte. Mehmed Fuad Pasha had become Grand Vizier and was eager to see a bank emerge with an effective banknote issuance capacity. In line with the insistent position of France's ambassador, he made clear that British–French equality of participation would remain a necessary condition for granting the issuance privilege. In response, the Ottoman bank reached out to the Pereire brothers and their Crédit Mobilier, who assembled a group of distinguished French investors. On 16 November 1862 in Paris, the British and French negotiators reached an agreement that foresaw the winding up of the Ottoman Bank and transfer of its business to a newly created institution. Negotiations in Constantinople followed in December 1862 between a group of British and French representatives, supported by the two countries' embassies, and the Ottoman authorities. As Layard had suspected in late 1856, and in spite of the replacement of Fuad by Yusuf Kamil Pasha as Grand Vizier, the compromise that was found on the new bank's governance stipulated that its formal head office, board of directors and general manager would be located in Constantinople, but that the latter would be a foreign national and ultimately report to the committees to be formed in London and Paris. The Porte would only appoint a Commissioner with limited powers of oversight. The issuance privilege would be initially granted for a duration of thirty years, and came with a full tax exemption. The bank would execute all financial operations of the Ottoman Treasury in Constantinople, and would be the government's financial agent both domestically and abroad. The bank would thus provide services of a central bank with simultaneous commercial operations, a combination that was not unusual at the time.

These arrangements were enshrined in a concession agreement which Kamil signed on 27 January 1863 together with Fuad, foreign minister Mehmed Emin Âli Pasha, finance minister Mustafa Fazıl Pasha, and chief auditor Ahmed Vefik Pasha. On 4 February 1863, the agreement was ratified by firman of Sultan Abdulaziz. On 5 March 1863, the Ottoman government registered the new Imperial Ottoman Bank which could then start its operations. That same day in London, the shareholders of the English-chartered Ottoman Bank voted to liquidate it in accordance with the November 1862 agreement, a process that was only finalized in June 1865. Meanwhile, the transfer of the old bank's operations in Constantinople to the new one had been completed on 1 June 1863.

The governance concept of the BIO was unique and unprecedented. The two committees in London and Paris were not expected to meet jointly; instead, decisions by one committee became effective once ratified by the other committee. The annual general meetings of its shareholders were held in London. The original committees included: in London, Sir William Clay (chair), James Alexander, John Anderson, Thomas Charles Bruce, George T. Clark, William Richard Drake, Pascoe St Leger Grenfell, Augustus Edward Hobart-Hampden, John W. Larking, Lachlan Mackintosh Rate, and John Stewart; and in Paris, Charles Mallet (chair), A. André, Vincent Buffarini, Raffaele de Ferrari, Achille Fould, Frédéric Greininger, Jean–Henri Hottinguer, the Pereire brothers, Alexis Pillet-Will, Casimir Salvador, and Antoine Jacob Stern. Alexandre de Plœuc became the first general manager in Constantinople, with Edward Gilbertson as his deputy and the local board being otherwise composed of John Stewart, representing the London and Paris committees, and local bankers Antoine Alléon and Charles Simpson Hanson.

=== First years of activity and convention of February 1875 ===
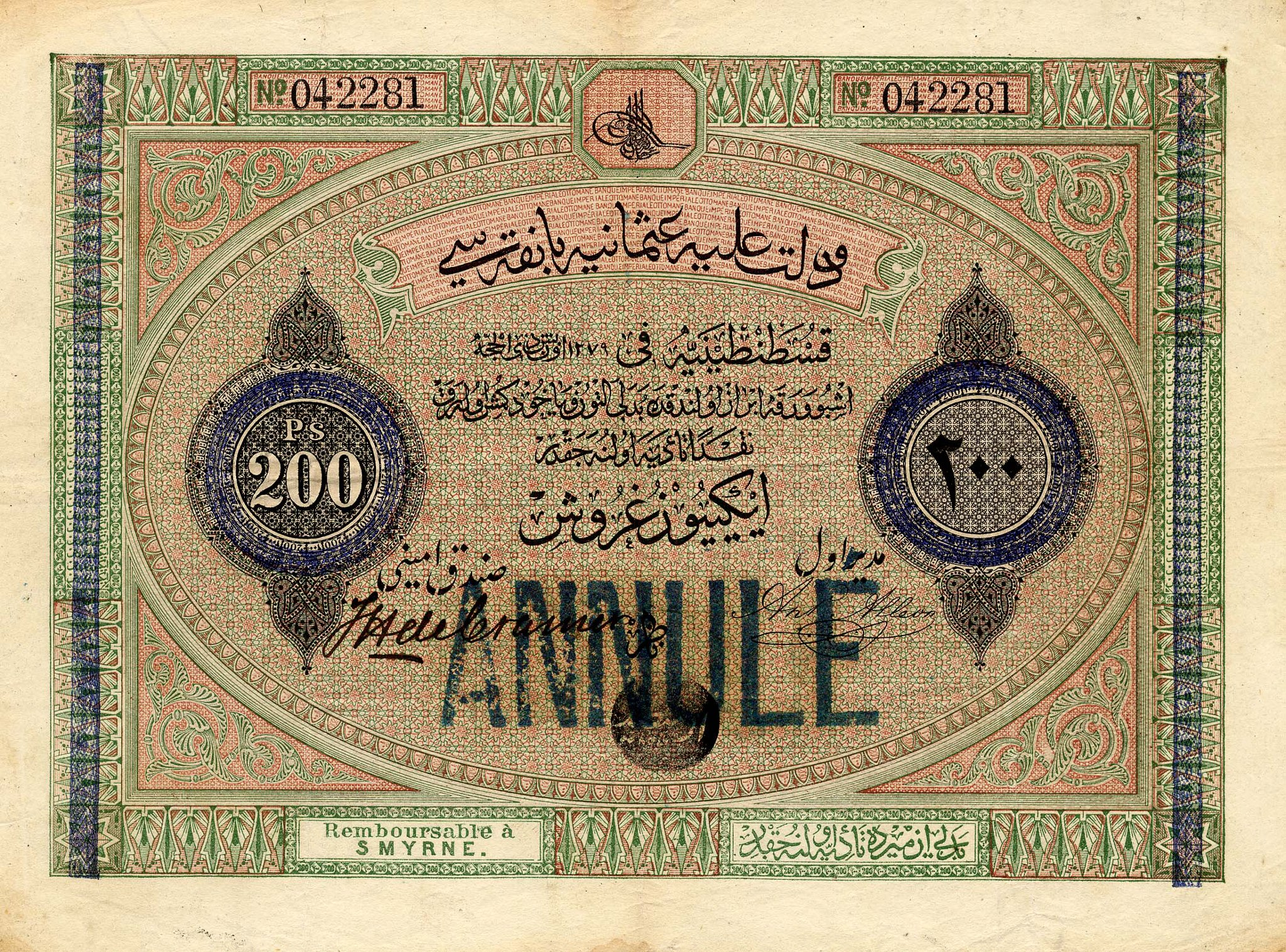
BIO banknote issued in Smyrna, 1863

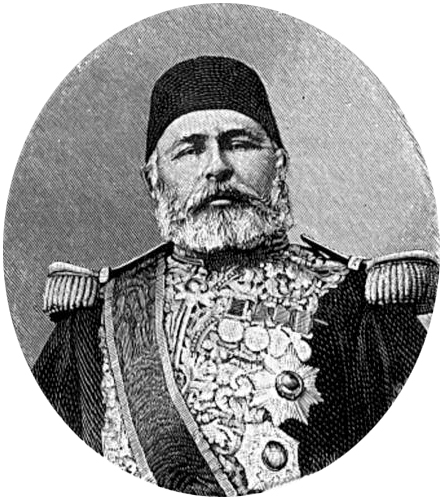
Grand Vizier Hüseyin Avni Pasha (1820–1876) promoted the BIO's role as treasurer of the Ottoman imperial government, enshrined in the convention of February 1875 but never fully implemented

The early activity of the BIO was mostly about providing financing to the Ottoman government, even though as early as August 1865 the bank's staff was concerned about the creditworthiness of its main debtor, and the BIO was by no means the only player on that market.

The BIO was not entirely oblivious of the broader financing needs of the Ottoman economy, however. As a complement to its own activity of lending to the Imperial government and international financial transactions, it sponsored in 1864 the creation of a separate bank that would focus on lending to local businessmen and local government. That "younger sister", named the Société Générale de l'Empire Ottoman (SGEO, "General Company of the Ottoman Empire"), had as initial shareholders the BIO itself together with a number of Galata bankers such as Aristide Baltazzi, the Camondo family bank, Boghos Mısırlıoğlu, the Zafiropoulo & Zafiri partnership, and Christakis Zografos, as well as international partners Bischoffheim & Goldschmidt (Paris and London), Frühling & Göschen (London and Leipzig), Oppenheim, Alberti et Cie (Paris), Augustus Ralli (Marseille), Stern Brothers (London), and Siegmund Sulzbach (Frankfurt). After a few years, however, the relations within that group deteriorated, and by the 1870s the BIO had cut most of its exposure to the SGEO, which was eventually liquidated at the expiration of its initial 30-year term in 1893, at the time when the BIO was starting to develop its own commercial and retail banking operations throughout the Empire.

Also in 1864, the BIO opened a branch in Salonica, the main Ottoman port city where it was not already present, and another one in the Cypriot port city of Larnaca. In November 1865, however, the shareholders rejected plans for more ambitious branch network expansion. In 1866, political developments in the newly formed United Principalities of Moldavia and Wallachia led the BIO to transform its two branches there, in Galaţi (est. 1856) and Bucharest (est. 1861) to a local subsidiary, the Bank of Romania, while their bad assets were retained by the BIO and eventually liquidated by 1872. In October 1867, the BIO opened a branch in Alexandria, its first in the Khedivate of Egypt. In 1868, a commercial branch was opened in Paris, first at 30, boulevard Haussmann; in 1870 it moved to the prestigious address of 7, rue Meyerbeer, facing the Palais Garnier, where it would remain for more than a century.

In 1868, the Ottoman Bank faced its first serious competitor with the creation of Crédit Général Ottoman, a rival institution sponsored by France's Société Générale and several Galata bankers including the Tubini family but also Christakis Zografos and Stefanos Zafiropoulo, who had been the BIO's partners in the SGEO venture. The Crédit Général Ottoman was a major underwriter of Ottoman treasury bonds, but ceased to operate in 1899. Two other competitors were promoted soon afterwards by Austria-Hungary, namely the Austro-Ottoman Bank (French: Banque austro-ottomane, German: Austro-Ottomanische Bank) sponsored by the Anglo-Austrian Bank and Wiener Bankverein in 1871, and the Austro-Turkish Bank (French: Banque austro-turque, sometimes Société de crédit austro-turque) in 1872. Neither survived the financial turmoil of the 1870s; the Austro-Ottoman Bank was merged into the BIO in 1874.

The Ottoman state's continued financial challenges led successive grand viziers Mehmed Rushdi Pasha and Hüseyin Avni Pasha to seek an expansion of the role of the BIO by making it the operator of all imperial treasury operations, including all revenue collection, expenditures, and short-term funding, with the aim to restore confidence in the state's financial discipline and thus improve its access to credit. The Porte sent senior official Mehmed Sadık Pasha to Paris to negotiate the new convention in April 1874, and the text was promptly signed there on 18 May 1874. It stipulated that the bank would operate the Ottoman treasury in all provinces where it had a branch, and would open new branches where it was not already present. The BIO would receive a fee of 0.75 percent on all government financial transactions, and 1 percent on short-term government debt issuance. The BIO subsequently absorbed the Austro-Ottoman Bank at the Porte's request, and led a major Ottoman bond issuance in several phases, later in 1874 and early 1875. Nevertheless, the convention of May 1874 became an object of controversy in Constantinople, not least among foreign powers other than France and the UK, namely the German Empire and especially the Russian Empire. It was renegotiated into an amended version, which was signed on 17 February 1875 and promptly ratified by Sultan Abdulaziz, with a reduction of the BIO's commission on treasury operations from 0.75 to 0.5 percent.

The creation of new branches was a generally loss-making proposition for the BIO and consequently fell well short of the convention's stated ambitions, with only three new locations opened in 1875 in Bursa, Edirne and Ruscuk plus a sub-office of the Beirut branch in Damascus. More generally, the implementation of the convention and of the BIO's new role quickly ran into practical difficulties and opposition from local government officials, compounded by the dismissal in late April 1875 of its champion Hüseyin Avni Pasha. The BIO syndicated a number of new loans throughout 1875 but retained little of them on its own balance sheet.

=== Crisis of 1875–1881 ===
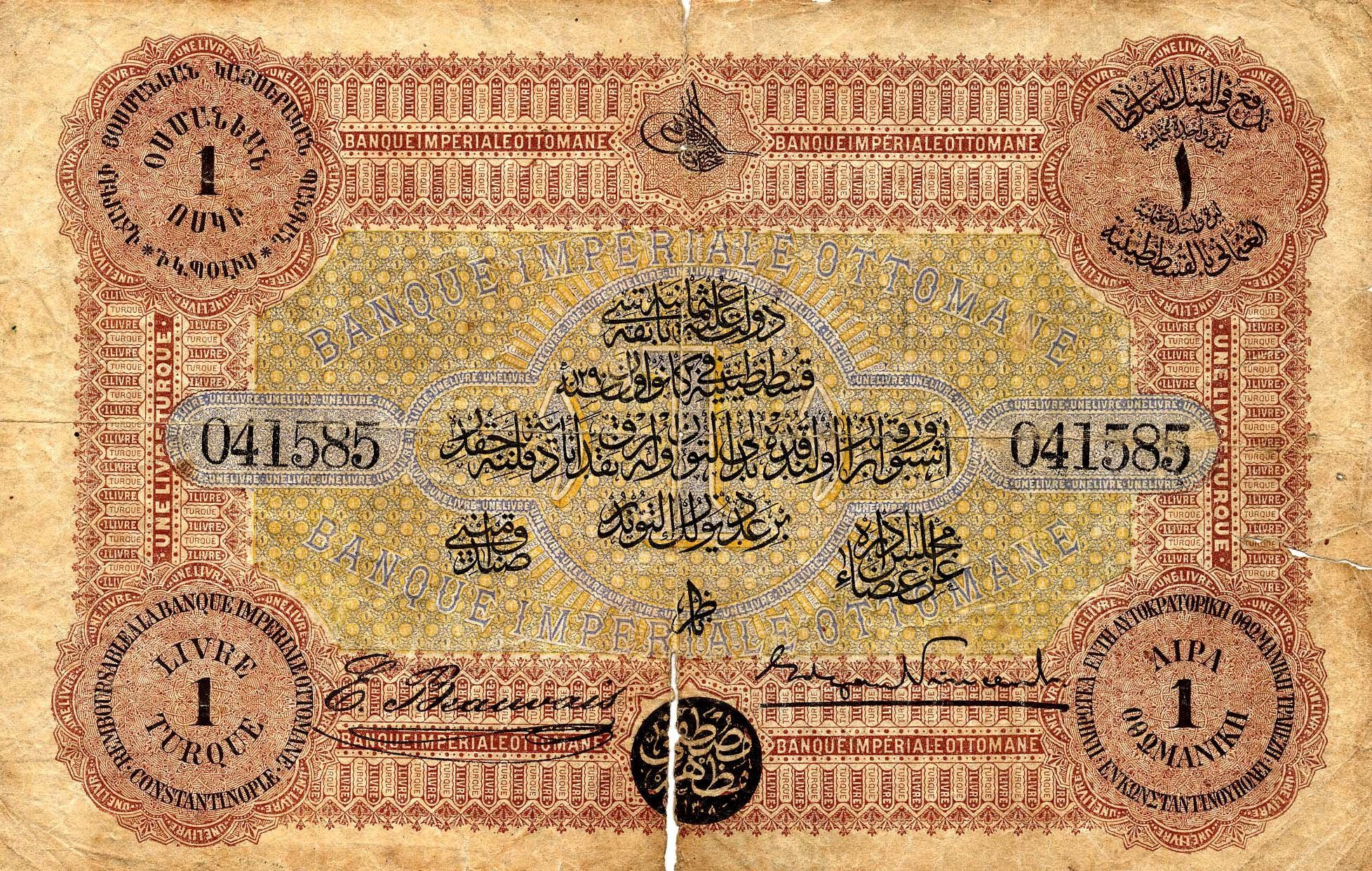
BIO banknote issued in July 1880 on a 1875 design with Abdulaziz's tughra and inscriptions in Arabic, Armenian, French, Greek, and Ottoman Turkish

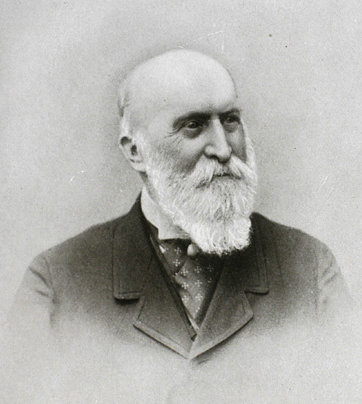
Charles Mallet (1815–1902), longstanding chairman of the BIO's Paris committee and an early advocate of what became in 1881 the Ottoman Public Debt Administration

Starting with the Herzegovina uprising in July 1875, the Great Eastern Crisis resulted in renewed financial stress. On 6 October 1875, grand vizier Mahmud Nedim Pasha unilaterally decided and announced a change in the terms of reimbursement of the recent loans, without consulting the BIO, and later in 1875 the Ottoman authorities suspended the implementation of the February convention altogether. The Empire's security situation kept deteriorating with the April Uprising of 1876 in Bulgaria and the declaration of Serbian–Ottoman War in June 1876, as well as the successive depositions of Sultan Abdulaziz on 30 May 1876 and of his nephew and short-lived successor Murad V on 31 August 1876. In 1876 and 1877, the authorities fueled inflation by issuing new Ottoman liras in the form of paper currency or kaime, as they had done during the Crimean War, which were later repurchased at a depreciated rate. On 24 April 1877, Russia in turn declared war on the Ottoman empire. Following protracted negotiations in London, the BIO led a new loan backed by the tribute from the Khedivate of Egypt, which was partly released from its pledging as collateral for prior Ottoman borrowing in 1854 and 1871, but its placement failed in December 1877 following Ottoman military setbacks at the Battle of Kars and the Siege of Plevna. During that turbulent period, the BIO reduced its activity and cost base and suspended dividends, while its claims on the Ottoman state ballooned.

In the spring of 1878, following the Treaty of San Stefano and cessation of hostilities, the BIO lobbied for a resolution of the Ottoman public debt situation to be considered at the Congress of Berlin. The chairman of its Paris committee, Charles Mallet, suggested to French foreign minister William Waddington a new organization on the model of the Caisse de la Dette that had been established in 1876 for Egypt, but with greater consideration of Ottoman sensitivities. The Treaty of Berlin of 13 July 1878 partly addressed the debt challenge by establishing revenue flows from the newly independent territories (Bulgaria, Montenegro, Eastern Rumelia and Serbia), thus supporting the payment of the Ottoman public debt and war reparations. By convention of 22 November 1879 the Ottoman authorities farmed out six revenue streams to a BIO-led syndicate for a duration of ten years, namely stamp duty, taxes on alcohols, on fishing in Constantinople, on silk in four provinces, and the salt and tobacco monopolies, the latter two being by far the largest. This pledging of the so-called six contributions was widely understood as a stopgap measure pending a comprehensive solution to the debt problem, which the BIO kept advocating.

The war and its aftermath affected the BIO's network. In Bulgaria, the recently created branch in Ruscuk was transferred in May 1877 to Varna. Its activity restarted in 1878 but was then again transferred to Varna. The BIO considered building it up into a national bank, as it had done in Romania in 1866, but that project failed given the new country's instability, and the Varna branch closed in 1882. Meanwhile, immediately after the Berlin Congress created Eastern Rumelia in 1878, the BIO opened a branch in the capital Philippopoli (later Plovdiv). As Cyprus came under British rule, the BIO promptly opened branches in Nicosia and Limassol in 1879 to serve the new authorities on the island, with a dominant position despite local competition from the Anglo-Egyptian Bank. In the Khedivate of Egypt, the BIO opened a branch in Cairo in early 1881, and its main branch in Alexandria withstood the riots during the ʻUrabi revolt in 1882.

Negotiations on the Ottoman debt eventually started in Constantinople on 13 September 1881, and led to the agreement known by its ratification instrument, the Decree of Muharram of 20 December 1881, which closed the period of financial distress that had started in 1875. It created the Ottoman Public Debt Administration under a council of seven members, of which one was to be appointed by the BIO and to represent the signatories of the convention of November 1879, whose claims were reduced in line with the decree's general debt restructuring. Meanwhile, the BIO endeavored to implement its role of treasurer under the convention of February 1875, which in principle was still applicable, in a limited number of locations such as Bursa, Damascus, Edirne, Salonica, and Smyrna. It restarted distributing dividends from 1880.

== Expansion into commercial and investment banking (1881–1911) ==
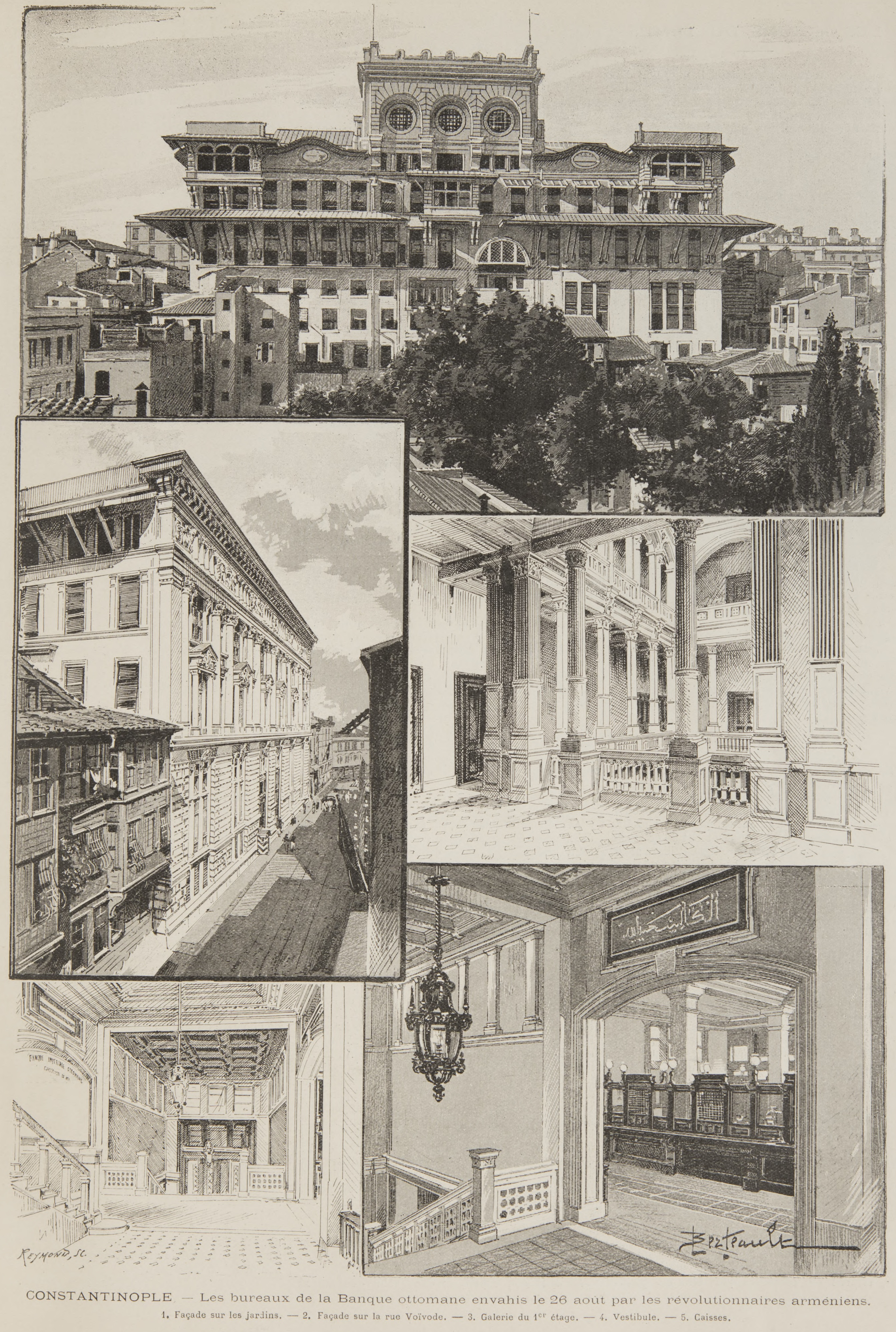
The BIO's new head office in Galata, inaugurated in 1892, featured in L'Illustration, September 1896

=== Investment projects ===
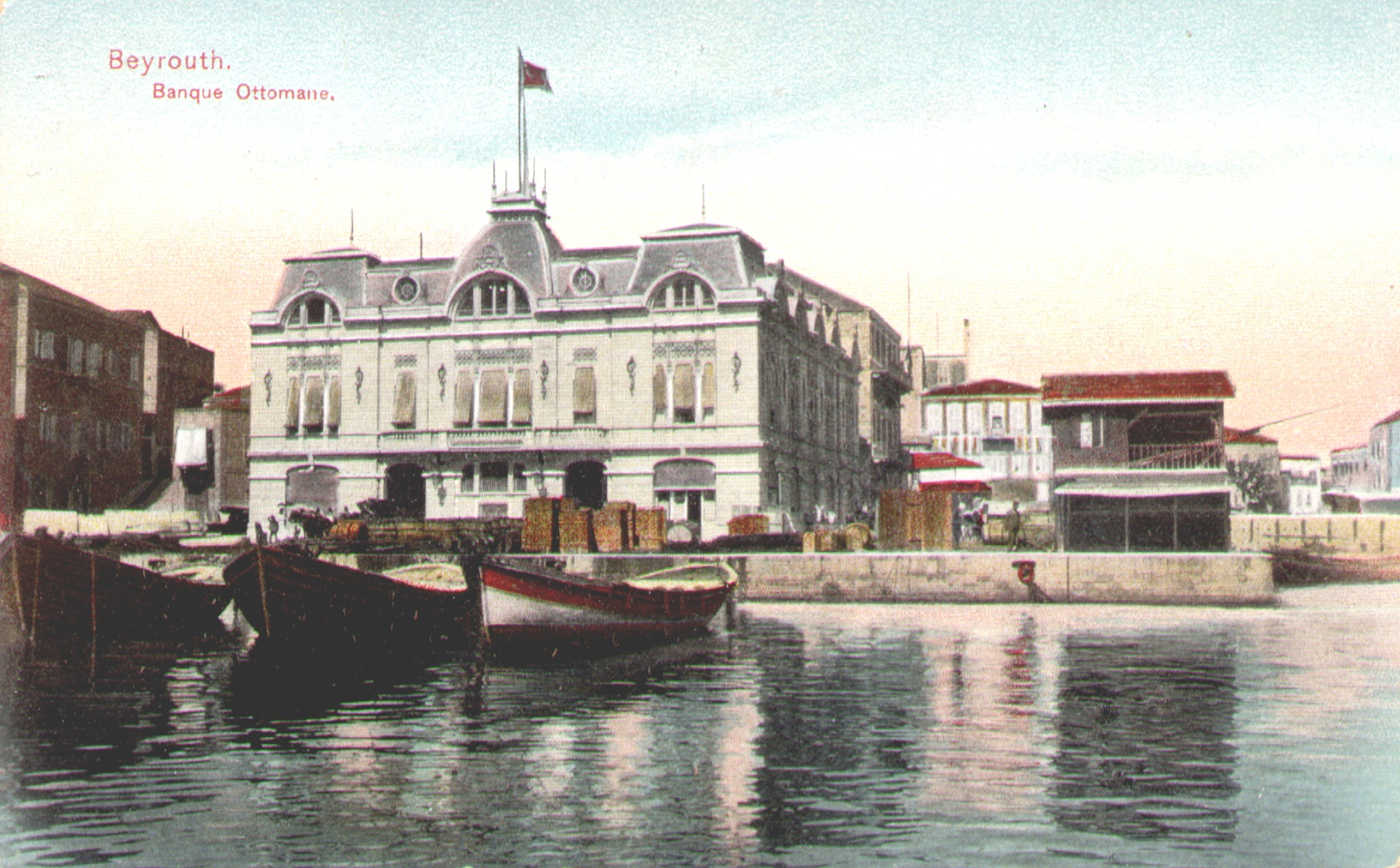
New BIO branch building in Beirut on the Port of Beirut waterfront, 1906

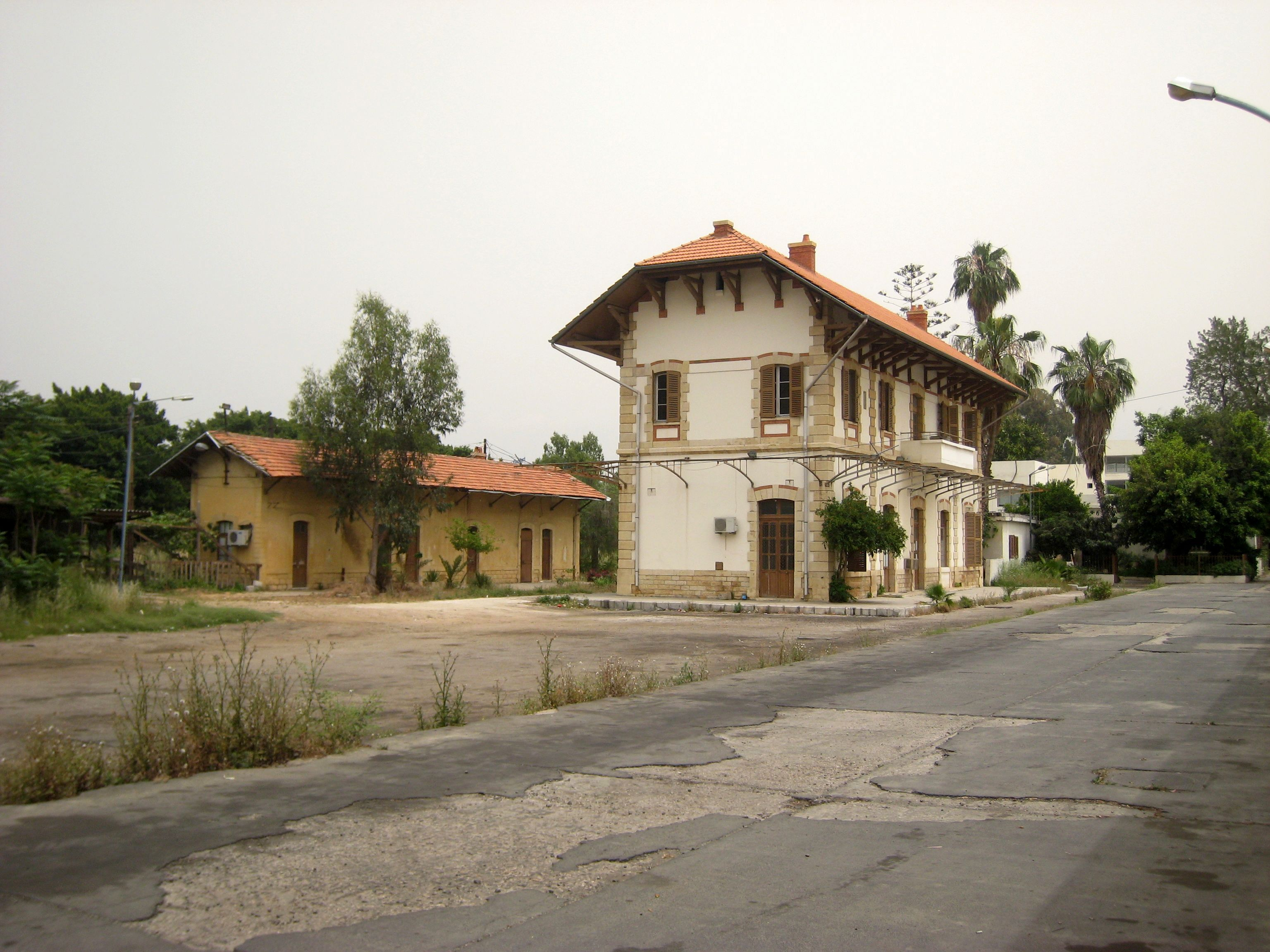
Beirut railway station in disrepair in 2007, the former starting point of the railway to Damascus and hub of rail transport in Lebanon

During the turmoil of the 1870s, and despite French hostility to Germany following defeat in the Franco-Prussian War, the BIO started reaching out to Austrian and German partners. Its acquisition of the Austro-Ottoman Bank in 1874 had given it connections in Vienna, and in 1881 it entered an informal partnership with banks Creditanstalt of Vienna and S. Bleichröder of Berlin to invest in joint projects, which became known as the "Consortium". Their first venture was to form a company to sell tobacco products, for which they obtained assent from the Ottoman Public Debt Administration which held rights over tobacco revenue, formed an entity known as Régie in 1883, and secured a thirty-year monopoly from 1884. The Régie or Ottoman Tobacco Company had a difficult start fighting smuggling, but became prominent enough that it shared half of the new head office building that the BIO had erected for itself in Galata in 1892.

From 1882, the Consortium sought to develop railways in the European part of the Ottoman Empire, or Rumelia, with the aim to connect Constantinople to Vienna. The Ottoman government in 1869 had granted the concession for what was known as the Chemins de fer Orientaux to international financier Maurice de Hirsch, who did not start the works and in 1882 approached the BIO with the aim to exit the venture. After several years of negotiations, the BIO in 1885 led the formation of the Société de construction des lignes de raccordement des chemins de fer de Roumélie, which pledged to build railway lines to the respective borders of Bulgaria and Serbia. Eventually, Hirsch sold his concession in 1890 to a group formed by Deutsche Bank and Wiener Bankverein in which the BIO was given a 25 percent stake, most of which it sold on to other investors including the Comptoir d'Escompte de Paris and Société Générale. This initiated an informal partnership between the BIO and Deutsche Bank, which gradually replaced the Consortium especially after Gerson von Bleichröder died in 1893.

The BIO was involved in early considerations of a railway from Haydarpaşa railway station, on the Asian side of Constantinople, to Anatolia and ultimately to Baghdad, which would later be known as part of the Berlin–Baghdad railway. In 1888, it formed a group of investors to this effect together with Bleichröder and the Disconto-Gesellschaft in Berlin, but Deutsche Bank won a competing concession later that year and the BIO redirected its focus to railway projects in the Levant and Syria. From 1888, the BIO was involved in the creation of the Compagnie du port de Beyrouth to develop the Port of Beirut together with the Compagnie de la route de Beyrouth à Damas led by Edmond de Perthuis. This was the first time the BIO acted in close coordination with the French government, which promoted the project. Construction works were completed in 1894, including the demolition of the ancient Beirut Castle, and the new port facility started operations on 1 January 1895. In 1891, the BIO participated in the creation of the Société des Chemins de fer ottomans économiques de Damas–Beyrouth–Hauran to build a railway connecting Beirut with Damascus and the Hauran region to its south, with the main Beirut–Damascus branch completed in June 1895. Further northwards extensions, however, turned out to be commercially and financially problematic, despite pressure from the French government to counter the German-sponsored Berlin–Baghdad railway. The rebranded Société ottomane des chemins de fer Damas–Hamah et prolongements eventually built a line to Hama in 1902, prolonged to Aleppo in 1906 and completed by an east–west branch between Homs and Tripoli in 1911. In 1906, the BIO relocated its Beirut branch to a new building on the port's waterfront.

In May 1899 in Berlin, the BIO and the Deutsche Bank agreed on a joint approach for the railway project toward Baghdad, which would unfold and unravel in subsequent years. On 18 February 1903 in Paris, the two institutions agreed to form a financing syndicate, an operating company and a construction company to execute the project. On 5 March 1903, a final act of concession was signed in Constantinople. But the project was conditional on attracting an international set of investors including a group from the UK, which failed to materialized in April 1903 because of negative British public perceptions about participation in a German-led endeavor. Through negotiations in Berlin in June, the BIO and Deutsche Bank produced a revised concept that maintained the appearance of equality between France and Germany, but given the tense relationship between the two countries, that was refused by both governments later in June. The railway to Baghdad ended up dominated by German and affiliated interests, with only limited participation by the BIO.

The BIO participated in the construction of the railway from Constantinople to Salonica from 1892 to 1896 (the greater part of which later became the Thessaloniki–Alexandroupoli railway), but with no large financial commitment as it correctly anticipated that the line would not be profitable. From 1894 to 1897 it led the development of the railway from Smyrna to Afyonkarahisar, known as Smyrne Cassaba & Prolongements. In 1896, the BIO played a major role in the establishment of a coal mining company in Heraclea on the Black Sea shore, now Karadeniz Ereğli, the main coal mine in Asia Minor.

=== Sovereign debt management and the liquidity crisis of late 1895 ===
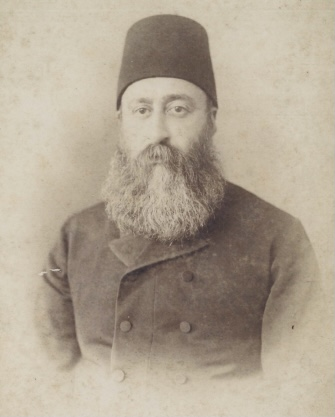
Hagop Pasha (1836–1891) led the Ottoman state's financial negotiations with the BIO in the late 1880s

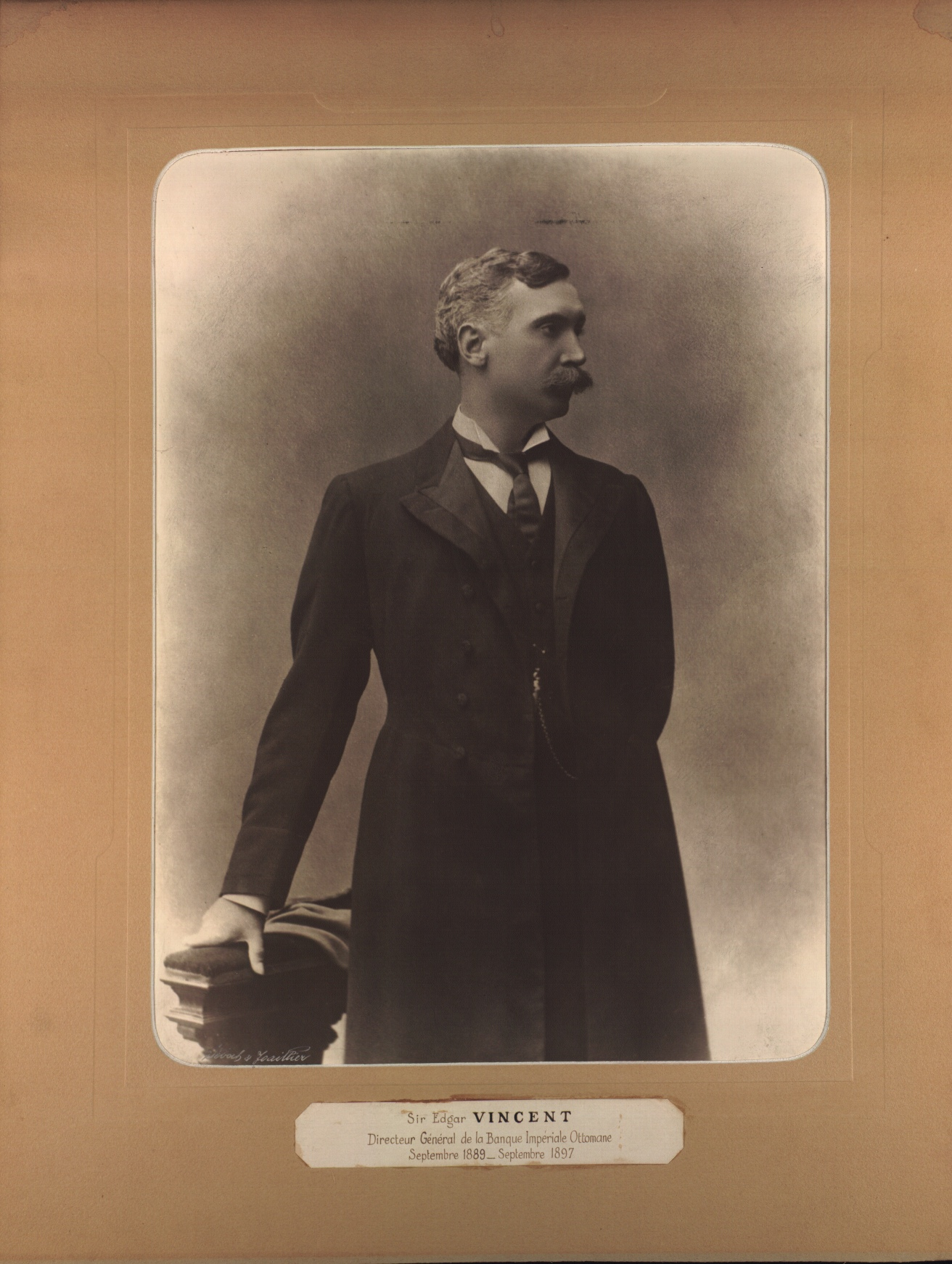
Sir Edgar Vincent (1857–1941) was the BIO's managing director during the boom-and-bust early 1890s

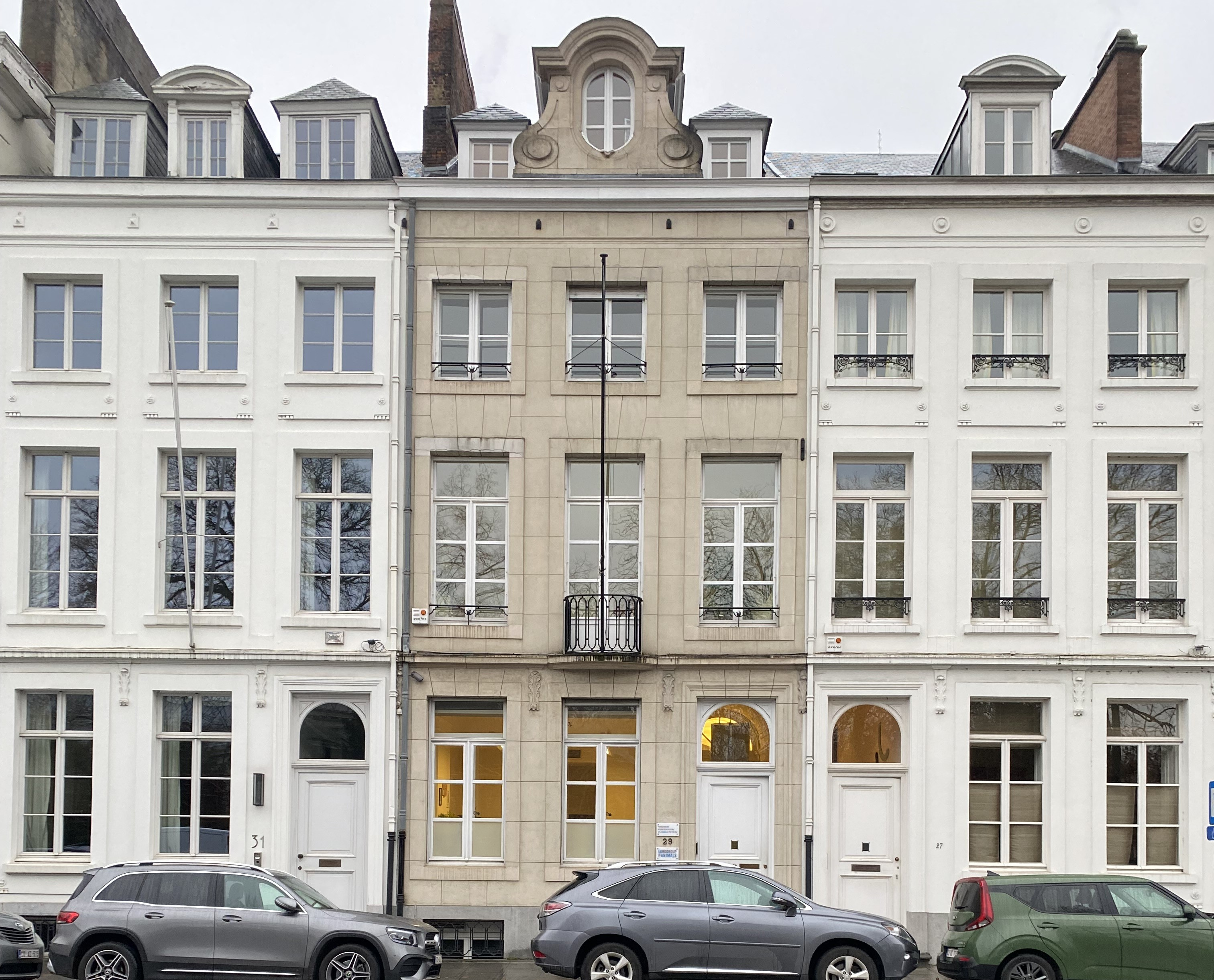
Former registered office of the Société Financière d'Orient at Rue Ducale 29 in Brussels (center)

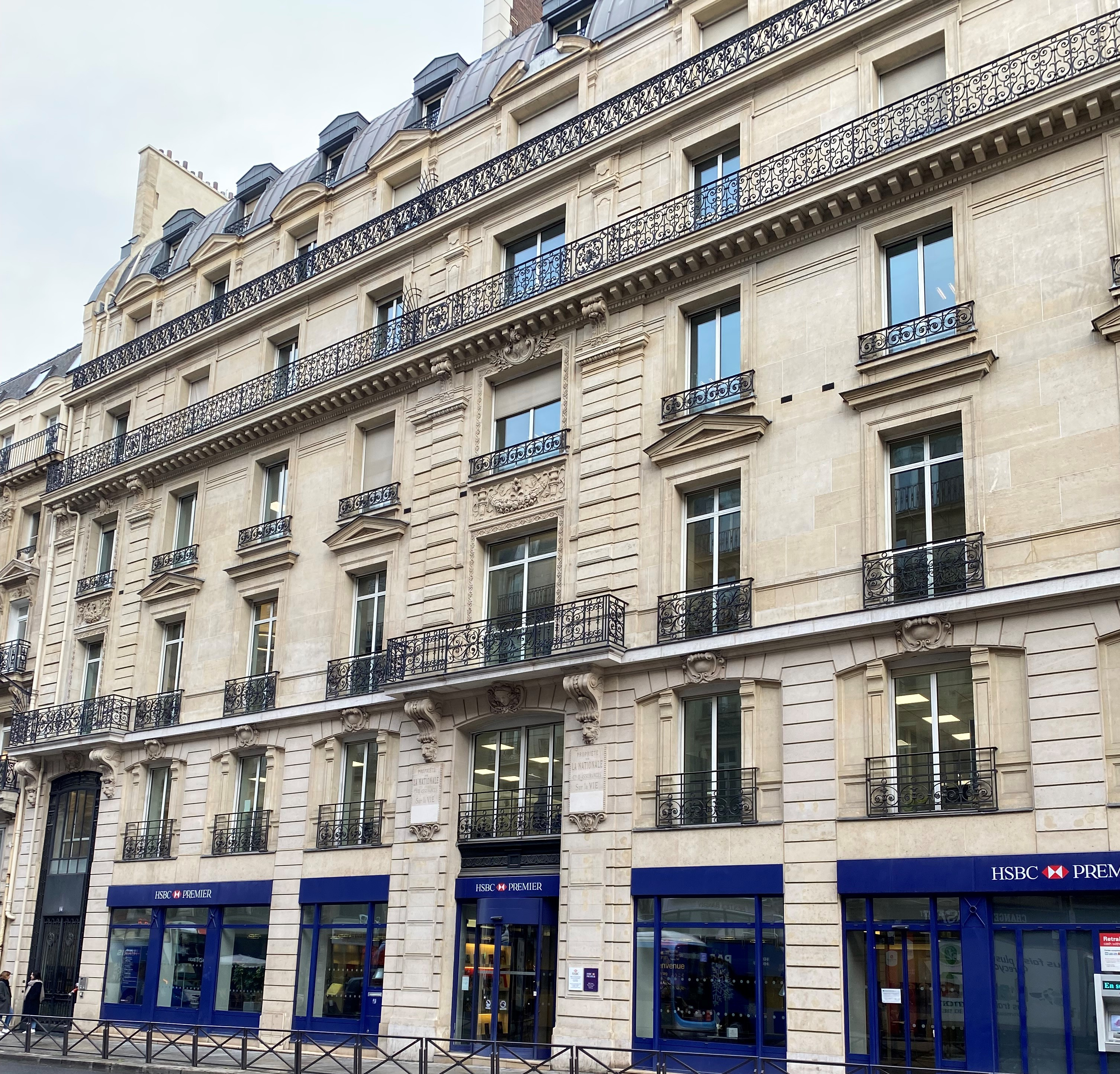
Former Parisian offices of the Société Financière d'Orient at 10, rue Auber

During the 1880s, 1890s and 1900s, the BIO kept its dominant role in orchestrating the financing of the Ottoman government, but reduced the exposures it retained on its own balance sheet. In 1886, it agreed on a restructuring of its outstanding loans to the government. It subsequently restarted short-term lending to the Ottoman treasury, but attempted to limit the corresponding amounts, which generated serious friction with finance minister Hagop Kazazian Pasha in the late 1880s. In October 1889, the BIO sought a new impetus by appointing Edgar Vincent as managing director for a term of five years. In March 1890, the BIO accepted a new restructuring of its lending to the government, and went on to work out other segments of the Ottoman debt legacy under favorable credit conditions in the early 1890s. It sponsored financial affiliates in third countries for purposes of financial arbitrage, namely the Geneva-based Société Financière Franco-Suisse in 1892 (joint venture with Union Financière de Genève), and the Brussels-registered Société Financière d'Orient in 1896, which was actually managed from Paris.

Starting in 1894, the BIO invested in South African gold mines. The rapid expansion of these and other BIO exposures led to an incipient bank run at Constantinople in early November 1895, following a market downturn in London, but that was promptly put to an end by a show of support by the Ottoman government including a 12-year extension of the BIO's convention term, from 1913 to 1925. The BIO subsequently reorganized its management to make it less centralized, placing the branch network under deputy general manager Gaston Auboyneau, and sharply reduced its exposures to railway projects and those in a number of branches. The late-1895 liquidity crisis was the most severe experienced by the BIO so far, but also eliminated many of its local competitors including several of the remaining Galata bankers.

In the 1900s, the bank was continuously involved in efforts to work out the Ottoman public debt, including the negotiation of a restructuring enshrined in the decree of 14 September 1903 together with the Comptoir National d'Escompte de Paris and the Banque Française pour le Commerce et l'Industrie. The deterioration of security in the three Ottoman provinces of Macedonia (Salonica, Monastir and Üsküb) during the period of Macedonian Struggle led the Western powers to request administrative reforms in the region. Rather than having to countenance yet more foreign intervention, Sultan Abdul Hamid II in early 1905 asked the BIO to take over the full treasury service in the three Macedonian provinces along the terms of the convention of February 1875, which had never been formally abrogated.

=== Commercial and retail banking ===
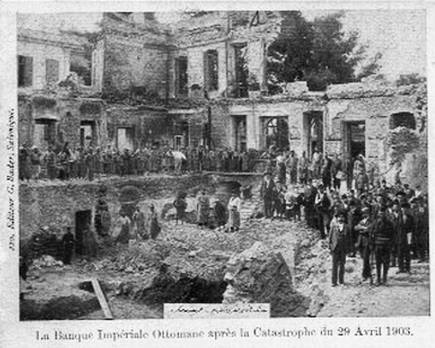
Clearing of the rubble of the Ottoman Bank branch in Salonica following its bombing on 29 April 1903

Simultaneously as he led the financial relationship with the Ottoman government in the early 1890s, Edgar Vincent initiated a program of opening new branch offices, particularly in Anatolia and beyond, as previously considered in 1865 and 1874 but never before implemented at scale. The BIO restarted a network in Bulgaria beyond the branch in Philippopoli that had opened in 1878, opening in Sofia in 1890 and (once again) in Ruse in 1892. From 1891, the BIO started opening savings accounts for retail customers in Turkey (and a bit earlier in Egypt). The 1890s were the time when the BIO's banknotes started circulating widely throughout the empire, instead of being largely confined to use in Constantinople as had been the case until then.

On 26 August 1896, the BIO's new head office in Galata, inaugurated on 27 May 1892, was the scene of a dramatic episode, remembered as the occupation of the Ottoman Bank. Activists of the Armenian Revolutionary Federation stormed the building to draw international attention to the plight of Armenians in the Ottoman Empire that were the targets of the Hamidian massacres. The bank's managers negotiated their safe exit and transfer to Marseille. Even so, the attack left eight dead and fourteen wounded among the Armenian activists, the Ottoman police, the bank's staff and clients.

In the late 1890s, the Bulgarian government requested the transformation of the BIO's branches in the country into a fully fledged local bank. The BIO attempted to create a "Bank of Sofia" with support from Bleichröder and Berliner Disconto-Gesellschaft, but that did not succeed and all three Bulgarian locations were liquidated in 1899.

In 1903, the BIO was again the target of an action intended to shock Western European public opinion, this time by Bulgarian nationalists participating in the Macedonian Struggle. The Boatmen of Thessaloniki, an anarchist group, bombed the bank's branch in Salonica and adjacent buildings on 29 April 1903, killing a night guard, as part of a two-day campaign of terrorist attacks that also damaged railways and a French passenger ship. The bank was able to reopen on a nearby location on 1 May 1903.

In 1903, the Cairo Stock Exchange was first established under leadership of businessman Moïse Yacoub (Moussa) Cattaui, in the former BIO branch building on what is now Adly Street. From 1904 on, the BIO was able to accelerate the expansion of its branch network, including in Egypt. One of the BIO's aims in opening new branches was to preempt competition from new peers such as the Banque de Salonique in Macedonia. Unlike in the past, the new branches quickly generated profits, and the BIO's commercial banking operations became increasingly dominant in its overall activity.

== Years of turmoil (1911–1925) ==
=== Wars in Libya and the Balkans ===
From the start of the Italo-Turkish War in September 1911, the Ottoman Empire entered a protracted period of near-continuous military engagements which put yet more strain on its finances. The BIO's role in the state's financing became less central, in part because of rising competition from the Banque de Salonique (despite the acquisition by the BIO of a minority stake in 1911), the Deutsche Orientbank, created in 1906 by three German competitors of Deutsche Bank, and the National Bank of Turkey, created in 1909 by financier Ernest Cassel. Following Ottoman setbacks in the Balkan Wars, the BIO and Deutsche Bank successfully lobbied to avoid the imposition of war reparations on the Empire in the treaties of Bucharest and Constantinople, but did not obtain a reduction of the Ottoman debt in proportion to the Empire's territorial losses.

=== Branch network in 1914 ===
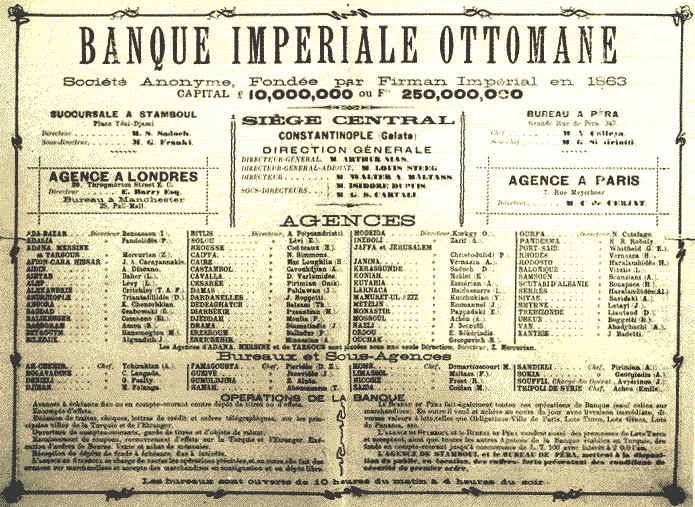
Advert of the BIO, early 1914

The early years of the war period did not interrupt the rapid expansion of the BIO's branch network, with 31 openings from 1908 to 1914, despite the closing of Benghazi and Tripoli following Italy's victory in Libya. An advert of early 1914 lists 83 branches, sub-branches and offices, in addition to the three head office locations of Galata, London and Paris:

- 4 in the remaining Ottoman lands in Europe: Stamboul (now Eminönü, opened 1886) and Pera (now İstiklal Avenue 115/A, 1891) in Constantinople; Edirne (1875) and Rodosto/Tekirdağ (1909) in East Thrace;
- 42 in Ottoman Anatolia: Smyrna (1856), Aydın (1863), Afyonkarahisar (1863–1880 and reopened 1899), Adalia/Antalya (1869), Bursa (1875), Nazilli (1881, with interruption 1898–1905), Adana and Konya (1889), Denizli (1890), Balıkesir, Uşak, Samsun and Trabzon (1891), Mersin (1892), Ankara (1893), Castambol/Kastamonu and Sivas (1899), Eskişehir and Akşehir (1904), Panderma/Bandırma and Bilecik (1905), Erzurum, Kerassunde/Giresun, Kütahya and Aintab/Gaziantep (1906), Adapazarı (1907), Tarsus (1908), Césarée/Kayseri, İnebolu, Ordu, Geyve and Bolvadin (1910), Diyarbakır, Kharput/Mamuret-el-Aziz/Elazığ, Bitlis, Van and Djihan/Ceyhan (1911), Bolu, Urfa, Sandıklı and Sokia/Söke (1912), and Dardanelles/Çanakkale (1914);
- 15 in the Arab-speaking Ottoman territories: Beirut (1856), Damascus (1875), Baghdad (1892), Aleppo and Bassorah (1893), Tripoli (1904), Jaffa and Jerusalem (1905), Haifa (1906), Mosul (1907), Homs (1908), Sidon and Hodeida (1911), Jeddah (1912), and Hama (1914?);
- 3 in the Khedivate of Egypt: Alexandria (1866), Port Said (1872), and Cairo (1881);
- 4 in British Cyprus: Larnaca (1862), Nicosia and Limassol (1879), and Famagusta (1906);
- 14 in European and Aegean territories lost by the Ottoman Empire during the Italo-Turkish War and Balkan Wars of 1911–1913: Shkodër in the fledgling Principality of Albania; Dedeağaç/Alexandroupoli (1904), Xanthi (1906), Gyumyurdjina/Komotini and Soufli (1910) in the Kingdom of Bulgaria; Salonica (1863), Mytilini (1898), Kavala (1904), Drama, Serres and Ioannina (1910) in the Kingdom of Greece; Rhodes (1911) in the Kingdom of Italy; and Monastir/Bitola and Üsküb/Skopje (1903) in the Kingdom of Serbia;
- 1 in the UK: Manchester (1911).

In April 1914, the BIO sold its Macedonian branches of Monastir/Bitola and Üsküb/Skopje to the Banque Franco-Serbe (BFS), established in 1910 and in which the BIO had an equity interest. Facing hostility from the Bulgarian government which had taken over Dedeagac, Gyumyurdjina and Xanthi, it had to liquidate all three branches. It also closed the branch in Shkodër in October 1914 following local turmoil.

Some of the bank's branches hosted other public services. For example, the BIO branch in the eastern Anatolian city of Van also served as the local office of the Ottoman Tobacco Company, the Ottoman Public Debt Administration, and the Ottoman Post Office.

=== World War I ===
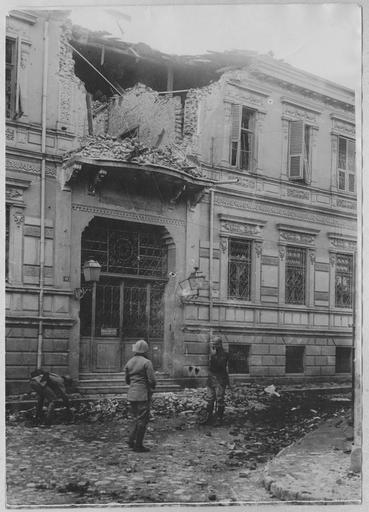
The Bitola branch of the Banque Franco-Serbe, formerly the Monastir branch of the BIO until 1914, damaged by war in January 1917

On 1 November 1914, the Ottoman Empire entered World War I against France and the UK. By then, three-quarters of the BIO's shareholders were French, the rest were mostly British, and its most senior managers were nationals from the two countries. Its seats in London and Paris were not treated harshly by the respective governments, but they were forbidden from transacting with the head office which was now in enemy territory. Conversely, London and Paris kept control of the bank's operations on allied ground, including Egypt, Cyprus, northern Greece, and territories conquered from the Ottomans such as Basra from February 1915, Mytilene from June 1917, and Palestine from January 1918, as well as Trabzon during its occupation by Russian forces. The BIO opened a branch in Marseille in 1916 to centralize the relations with France of its branches in Egypt and Greece. In Cyprus, nominally an Ottoman province but administered by the UK since 1878, the island was annexed in immediate response to the Ottoman declaration of war in November 1914. A run left the BIO's local operation with less than £4,000 in its vaults, and no means of replenishing its reserves from the head office in Constantinople. The bank was briefly closed by the island's British authorities and then allowed to re-open effectively as a separate semi-state company. In part this compromise seems to have been reached as the British authorities in Cyprus had themselves deposited their entire funds at the BIO, some £40,000, which would have been lost had the bank been forced to close.

In Constantinople, the BIO declined to further finance the government, and unilaterally renounced its issuance privilege, leaving the Ottoman authorities to issue paper money as they had already done in the late 1870s. On 31 December 1914, with no hope of receiving more credit from the BIO, Talaat Bey requested the replacement of the three French senior executives (namely Arthur Nias, Louis Steeg, and Isidore Dupuis) with their most senior colleagues who were Ottoman nationals, namely Georges Cartali, Marius Hanemoglou, and Berch Kerestejian. Nias instructed the latter to act as a collegial leadership, before traveling back to France together with Dupuis and Steeg. The other British, French, Italian and Russian employees of the BIO were generally allowed to keep their jobs. A later attempt by Talaat Bey to nationalize the BIO failed in July 1915, in part due to opposition from Deutsche Bank with which the BIO had a longstanding partnership, and to advocacy by Mehmed Cavid that the BIO's survival as a credible institution was in the Ottoman state's longer-term interest.

The ways the war affected individual branches were extremely diverse. In eastern Anatolia and elsewhere, the BIO's leadership led by Cartali managed to obtain exemptions for many of its Armenian staff from the Armenian genocide. The BIO's staff in Syria and Mesopotamia were also able to provide some financial services to deported Armenians despite the hostile environment. Throughout the war, the BIO kept processing the local financial transactions of the Ottoman government through its unparalleled network of branches, which made it easier to secure protection for its staff. It mostly refrained, however, from new lending business to either the government or the private sector, which led to a considerable erosion of its market share.

=== Postwar adjustments and change of control ===
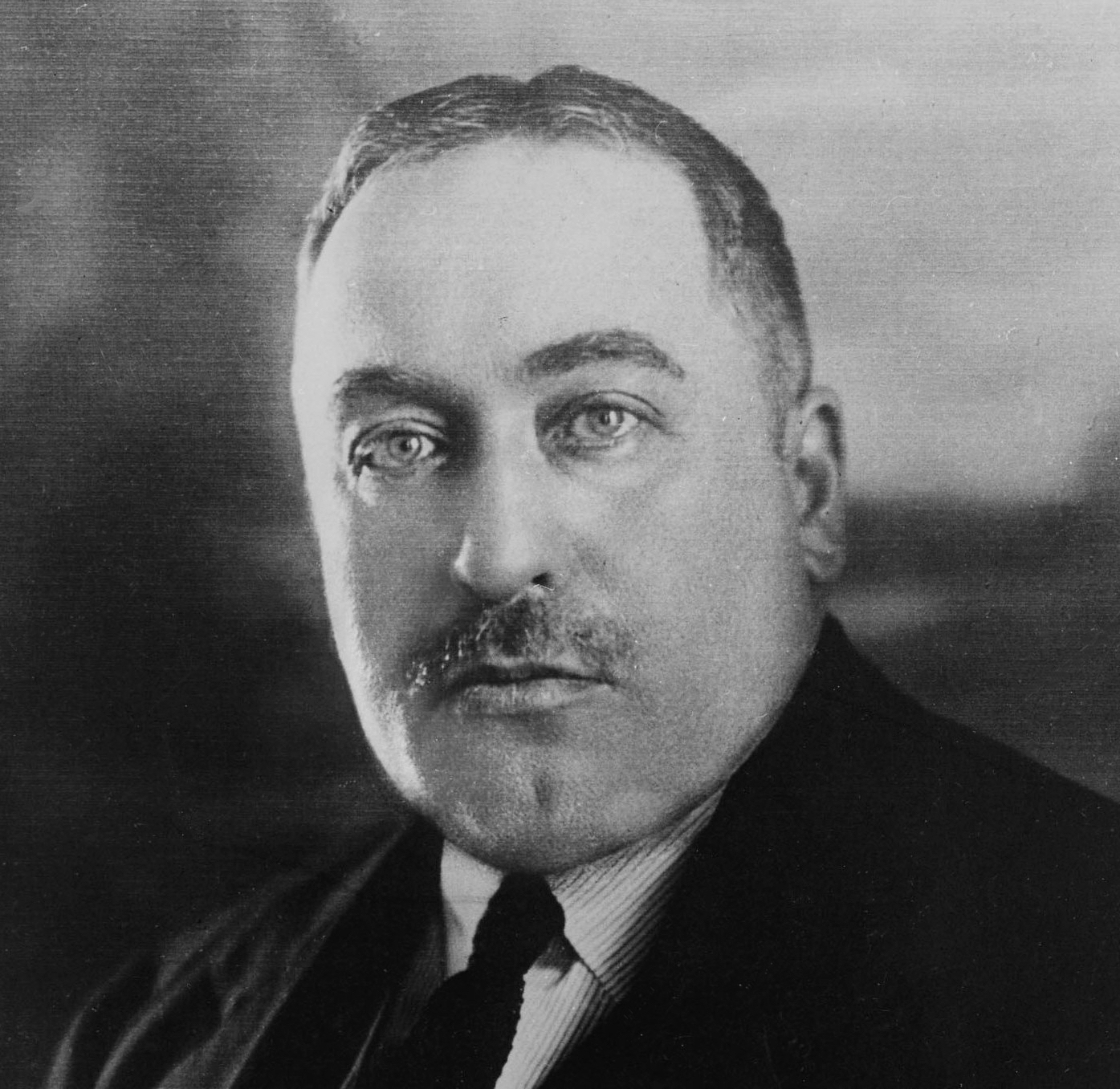
Horace Finaly (1871–1945) was the artisan of the takeover by the Banque de Paris et des Pays-Bas of a controlling stake in the BIO in October 1920

Following the end of World War I, the BIO determined that its former activity as a state bank had limited prospects, and that its future lay in the expansion of retail, commercial and investment banking services in the eastern Mediterranean. Instead of relocating its head office to France as it had briefly considered in 1918, the BIO decided to leverage its international identity and to re-emphasize the complementarity between London and Paris in its governance, even though by then only about a tenth of its shareholding base was British. It even envisaged co-opting some American nationals into its London and Paris committees. It regrouped the direction of its activities in Cyprus, Palestine, Mesopotamia and Arabia in London, which already had a leading role for Egypt.

In the aftermath of Ottoman incursions into western Iran during the Persian campaign of World War I, the BIO expanded into that region in 1919. It opened branches in Kermanshah (1920) and Hamadan (1922), as well as in Tehran also in 1922. Between 1919 and 1923, it made an abortive attempt to expand into the South Caucasus region with branches in Baku, Batumi, and Tbilisi. The BIO, however, declined in May 1920 the suggestion to be the anchor investor in a new state bank of the First Republic of Armenia, promoted by Calouste Gulbenkian. Elsewhere in the region, the BIO further opened branches in Paphos (1918), Kirkuk and Tunis (1920), Troödos (1921), Bethlehem, Ramallah, and Nablus (1922), in the Musky neighborhood of Cairo and in Ismailia (1924), Amman (1925), and Tel Aviv (1931). Conversely, it had to close both its branches in Arabia (Jeddah and Hodeida) and many in Albania, northern Greece and the Aegean (Shkodër, Ioannina, Serres, Drama, Komotini, Mytilene, and Rhodes).

In the Levant, following the secret Sykes–Picot Agreement of 1916, the French authorities pressured the BIO to transform its branches in the territories under French influence into a separate subsidiary. On 2 January 1919, the BIO consequently sponsored the establishment of a new Banque de Syrie, of which it initially held 94.45 percent ownership and which opened operations in Marseille and Beirut in April 1919. The situation in the region remained uncertain, however, until the French authorities expelled Emir Faisal from Syria in July 1920. Subsequently in 1921, the Banque de Syrie acquired from the BIO all its branches in the region, while the BIO sold some of its shares to local business leaders.

In October 1920, the Banque de Paris et des Pays-Bas (BPPB), together with the Banque Industrielle de Chine, the Crédit Foncier d'Algérie et de Tunisie, and Basil Zaharoff's Banque Commerciale de la Méditerranée, acquired a significant block of BIO shares from a group of investors who had tried and failed to force the creation of an Italian constituency in the BIO's governance. After initial misgivings in both Paris and London, the BPPB thus became the BIO's controlling shareholder. It would maintain that position until 1996.

In the BIO's core area of operations, the Turkish War of Independence disrupted its business until the return of peace with the Treaty of Lausanne in July 1923. During the war, the BIO endeavored to keep a position of neutrality and instructed its branches to cooperate with whichever forces were in control of the territory, while temporarily closing them if the local conditions made business entirely impossible. Its branch building in Smyrna, by then located on the waterfront, was entirely destroyed by fire on 15 September 1922 during the Burning of Smyrna. Some branches such as Aydın, Afyonkarahisar, Erzurum and Kütahya only reopened in late 1923.

=== Normalization in Turkey ===
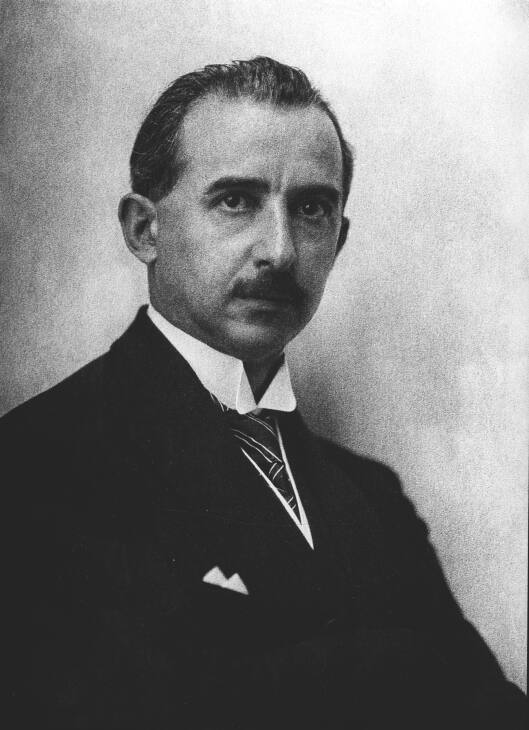
Ismet Pasha (1884–1973) signed the convention of March 1924 with the BIO on behalf of the new Turkish republican government

Following its victory of the Turkish War of Independence, the Republic of Turkey signed a convention with the BIO on 10 March 1924, under which it provided credit to the new Republican government in Ankara as well as its two banking champions, Ziraat Bank and the newly established İşbank. The BIO did not resume note issuance but agreed to continue servicing the financial operations of the public treasury, pending the creation of a new national bank, which only came in 1931 with the establishment of the Central Bank of the Republic of Turkey. In line with the new circumstances, the bank's name was changed back to Ottoman Bank in May 1925; even so, it was the only institution allowed to keep the word "Ottoman" in its name.

Two other conventions, respectively in 1933 and 1952, led to the full normalization of the Ottoman Bank's status as a commercial bank. In 1947, it redeemed its last circulating banknotes (all issued before 1914) and reimbursed them in gold at par, an achievement unmatched by any other note-issuing bank since the beginning of World War I.

== Ottoman Bank (1925–2001) ==
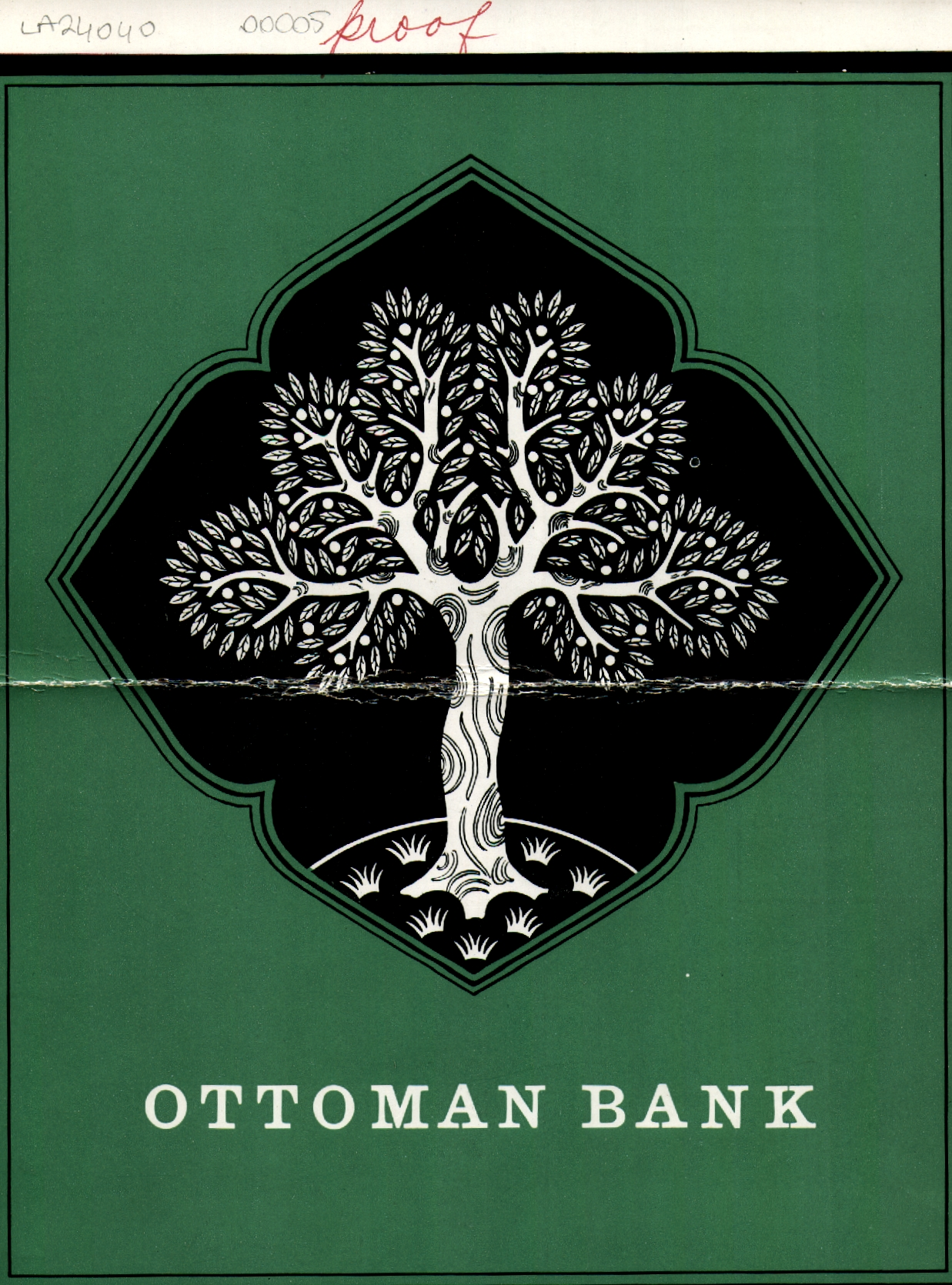
Logo of the Ottoman Bank, created by Edmund Dulac in 1947

=== French and British groups ===
Under the direction of the BPPB, the Ottoman Bank kept its dual British–French structure with individual country operations allocated to one or the other of the two committees. The Turkish bank itself and its subsidiaries in Syria, Lebanon and Yugoslavia remained under the Paris Committee. The London Committee managed the existing network in Cyprus and Egypt, and led new developments in Jordan (1925), Sudan (1949), Qatar (1956), Kenya, Uganda, Tanzania and Rhodesia (1958), Abu Dhabi (1962), and Oman (1969). Increasingly, this resulted in a bifurcation of the Ottoman Bank into two mutually autonomous groups.

The French group was gradually reduced to the Turkish operations of the Ottoman Bank. The Banque Franco-Serbe was nationalized by Yugoslavia in 1939. The Banque de Syrie et du Liban, formed in 1919 to take over the former BIO branches in those countries, had its Syrian activity nationalized in 1956 following the Suez Crisis, and merged into the state-owned Commercial Bank of Syria in 1966. The Lebanese operation lost its issuance privilege in 1963 following the creation of the country's central bank, the Banque du Liban;

As for the British group, the bank further opened branches in Egypt (El-Geneifa in the Sinai in 1940, Port Tewfik in 1941, El Mahalla El Kubra in 1942, Fayoum and Tanta in 1947), Cyprus (Kyrenia in 1943, Lefka and Morphou in 1946), as well as in West Jerusalem (1947), Erbil (1948), Khartoum and Port Sudan (1949). Conversely, in 1948 the Ottoman Bank exited from Iran, where it had never reached a large scale. In 1956, Gamal Abdel Nasser nationalized all Ottoman Bank operations in Egypt, and transferred them to the purpose-created Bank Al-Goumhouria together with those of Ionian Bank. The Ottoman Bank nevertheless kept opening new branches, in Qatar (1956), Abu Dhabi (1962), and Muscat (1969). In 1969, the BPPB sold all these remaining operations of the London-led group to National and Grindlays Bank. In 1975, Grindlays also purchased the Paris commercial branch and affiliated operations in Switzerland, which were renamed Grindlays Banque - France. Grindlays, in turn, was acquired in 1984 by the Australia and New Zealand Banking Group.

As of 1991, Paribas held nearly half of the total equity capital of the Ottoman Bank, the rest being dispersed among many shareholders.

=== Merger into Garanti Bank ===
In 1996, Paribas ceded its control of the Ottoman Bank to Garanti Bank, by then a fully owned subsidiary of the Doğuş Group. On 31 July 2001, Garanti merged the Ottoman Bank with Körfez Bank, and on 21 December 2001, integrated it fully into its own operations. This led to the disappearance of the Ottoman Bank brand name from all remaining branches. At the time of its merger, the Ottoman Bank had a network of 58 branches and around 1,400 personnel. Most of these branches have been maintained as branches of Garanti Bank since the merger.

== Human resources and leadership ==
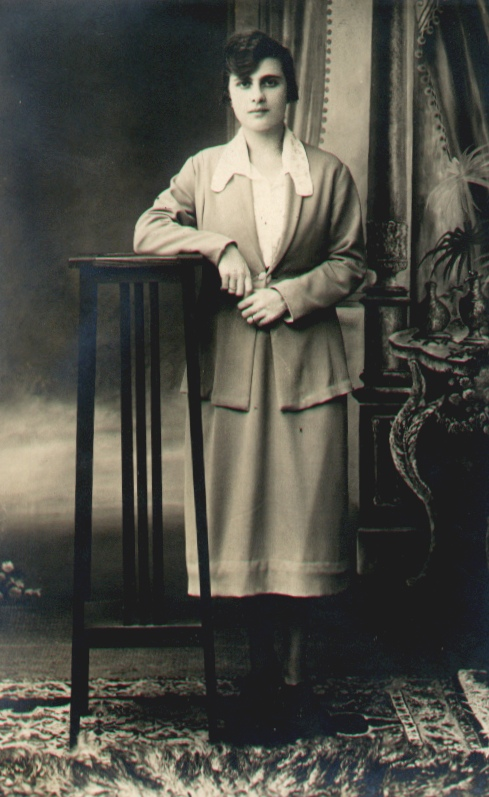
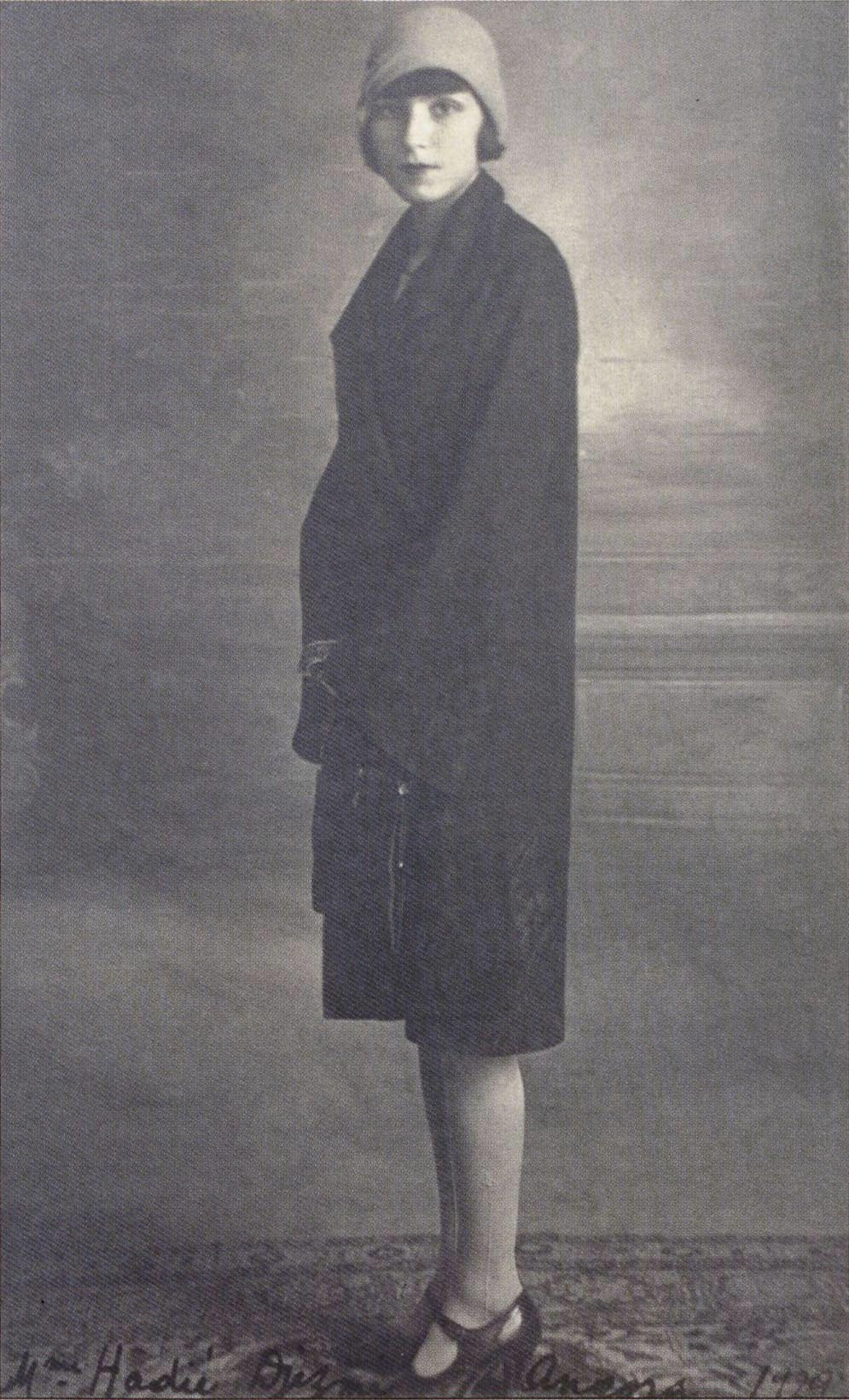
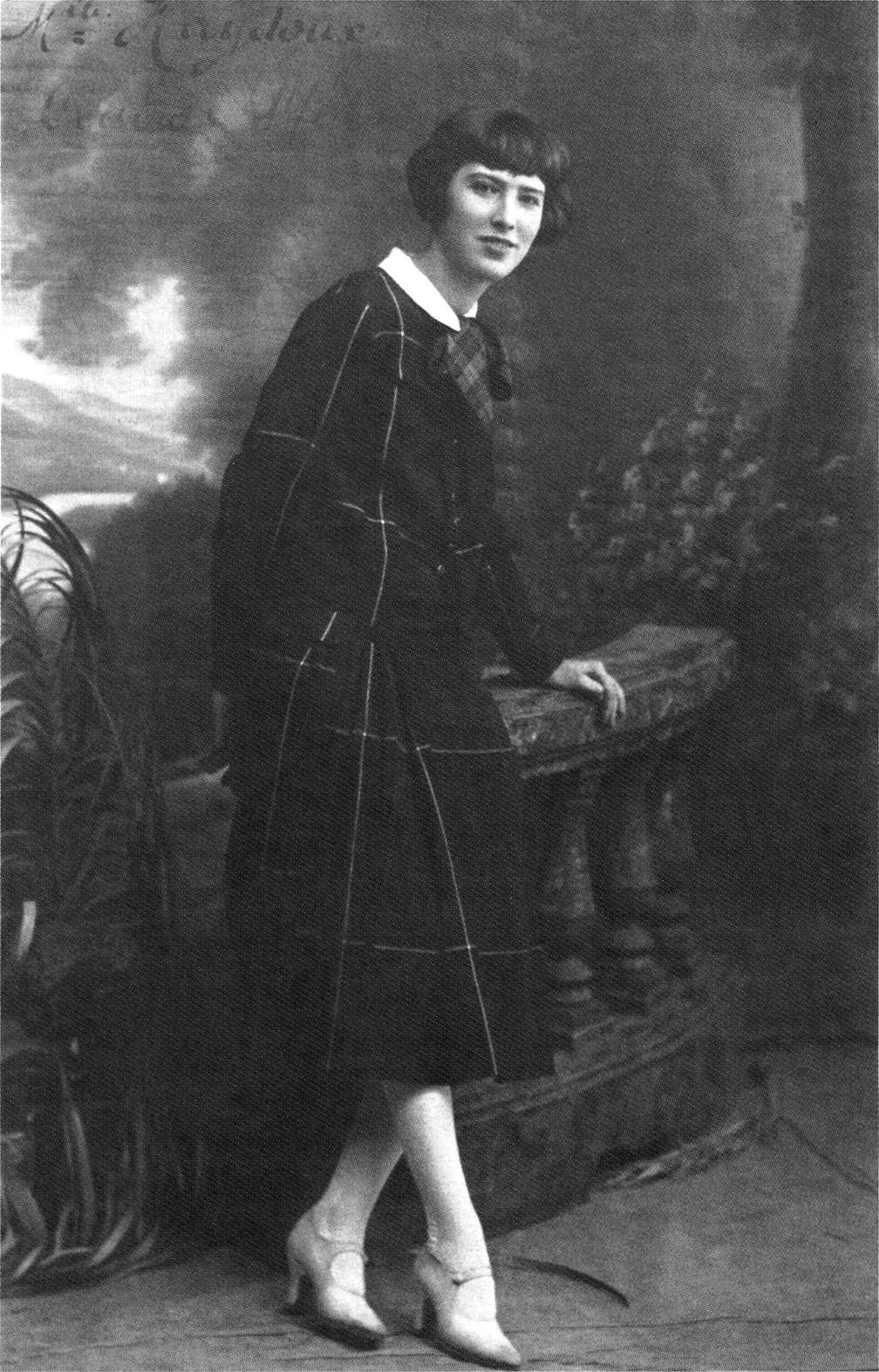
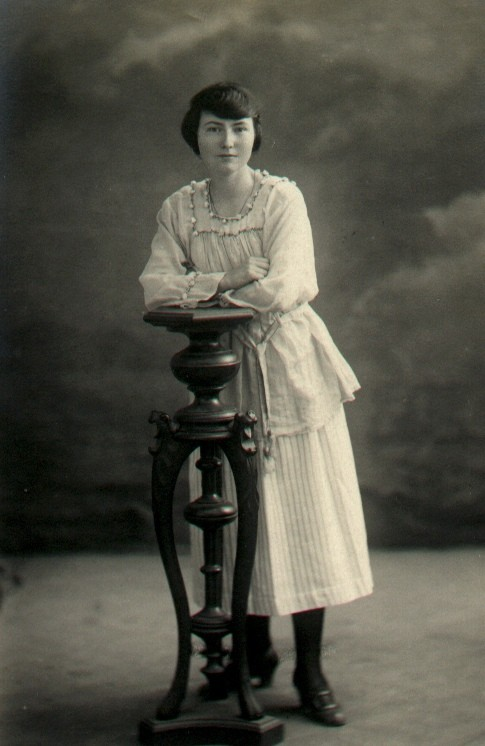
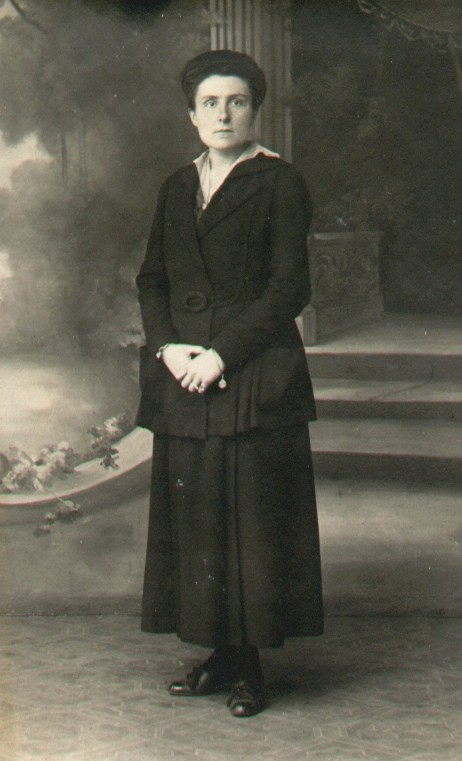
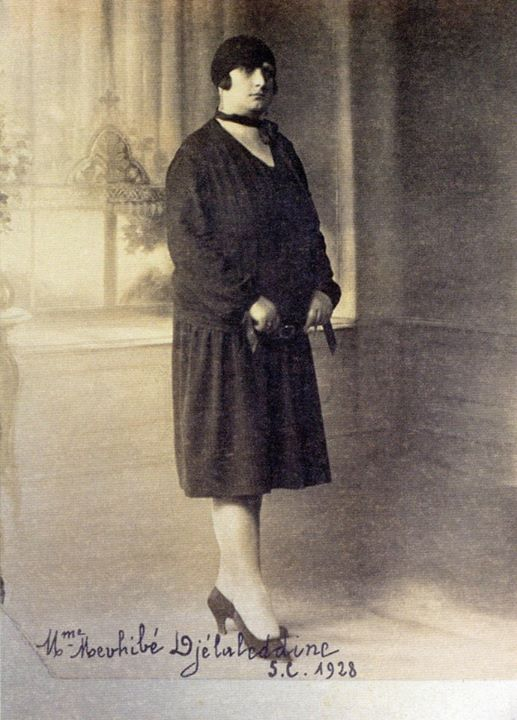
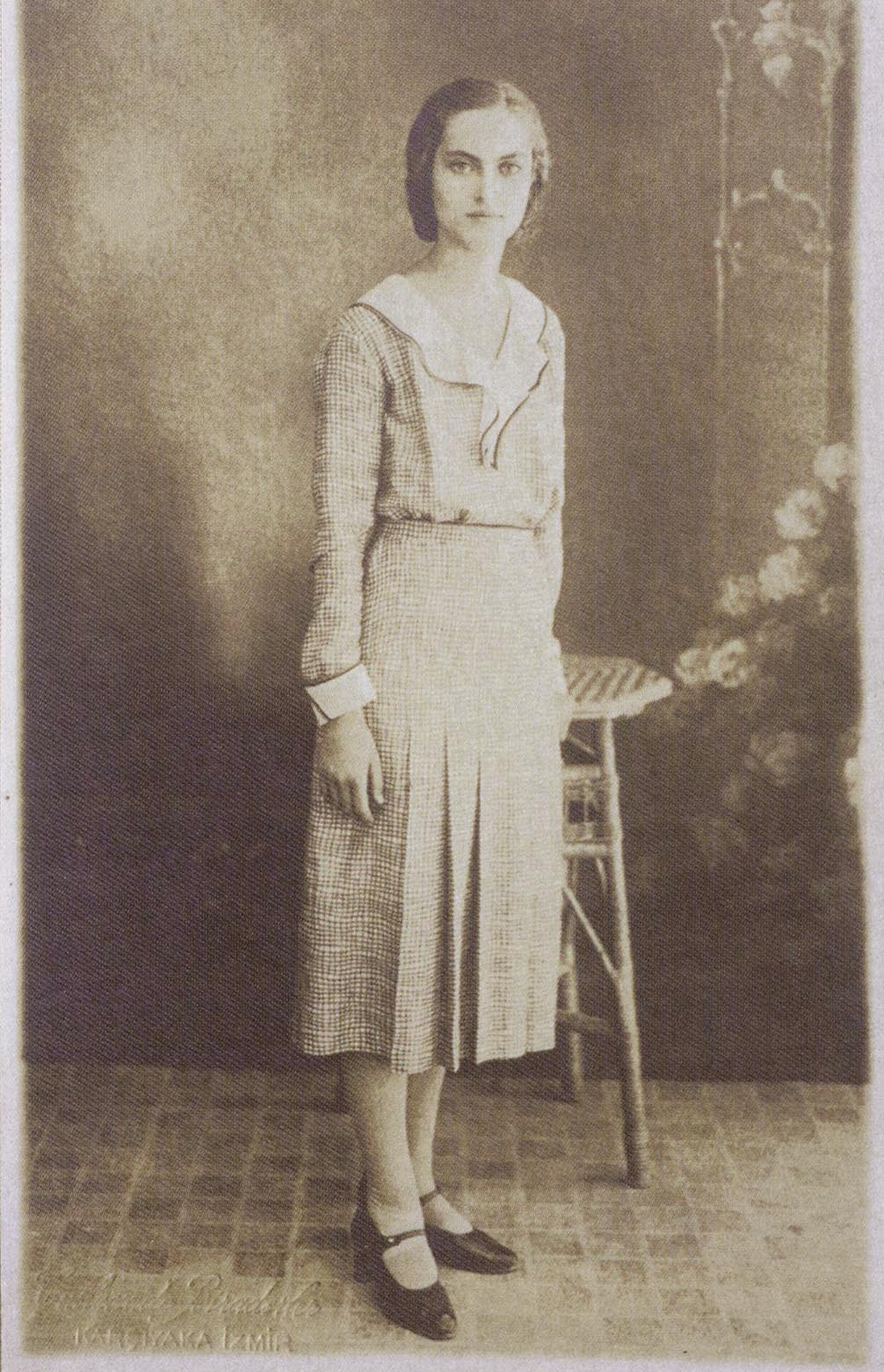
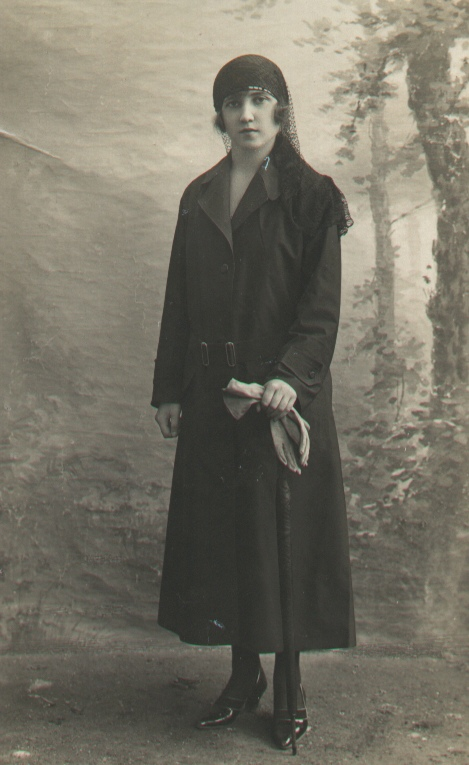
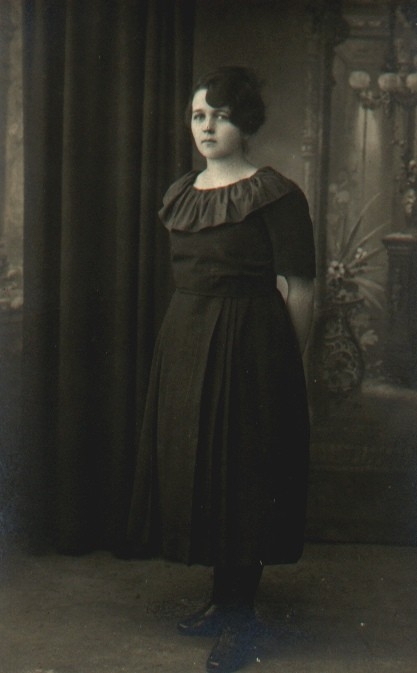
Female staff of the Ottoman Bank, early 20th century: Uranie Topuz, Hadiye Cezmi, Valentine Haydoux, Winifred Ireland, Helène Kroupensky, Mevhibe Celaleddin, Suzette Agah Hasib, Emine Beraet, Marguerite Gros

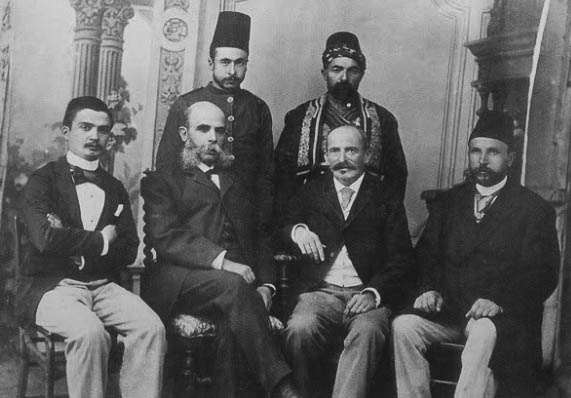
Staff at the Konya branch, 1889

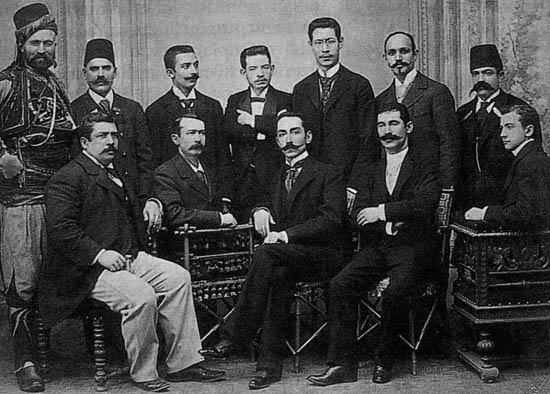
Staff at the Pera branch, 1895

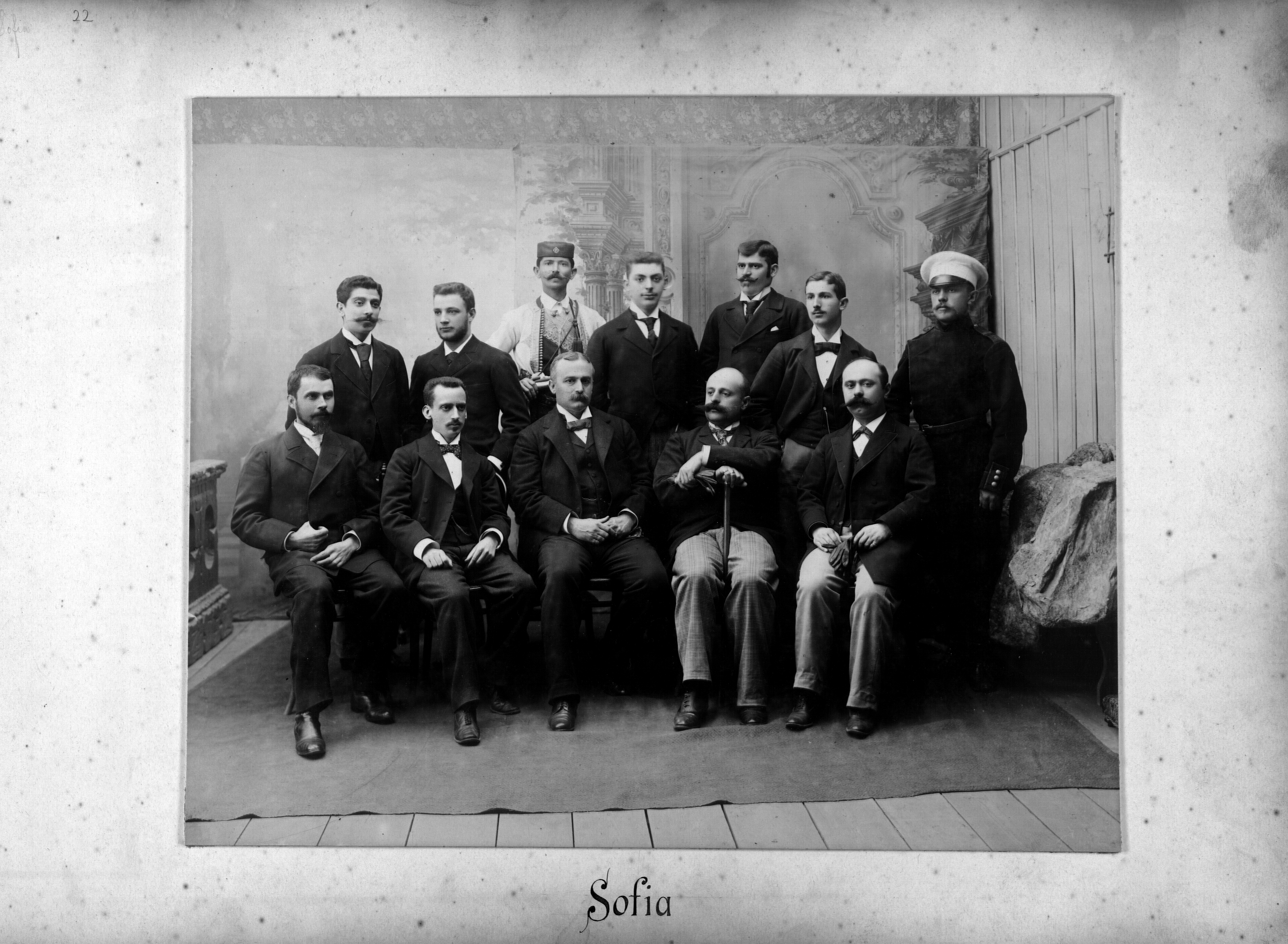
Staff at the Sofia branch, 1895

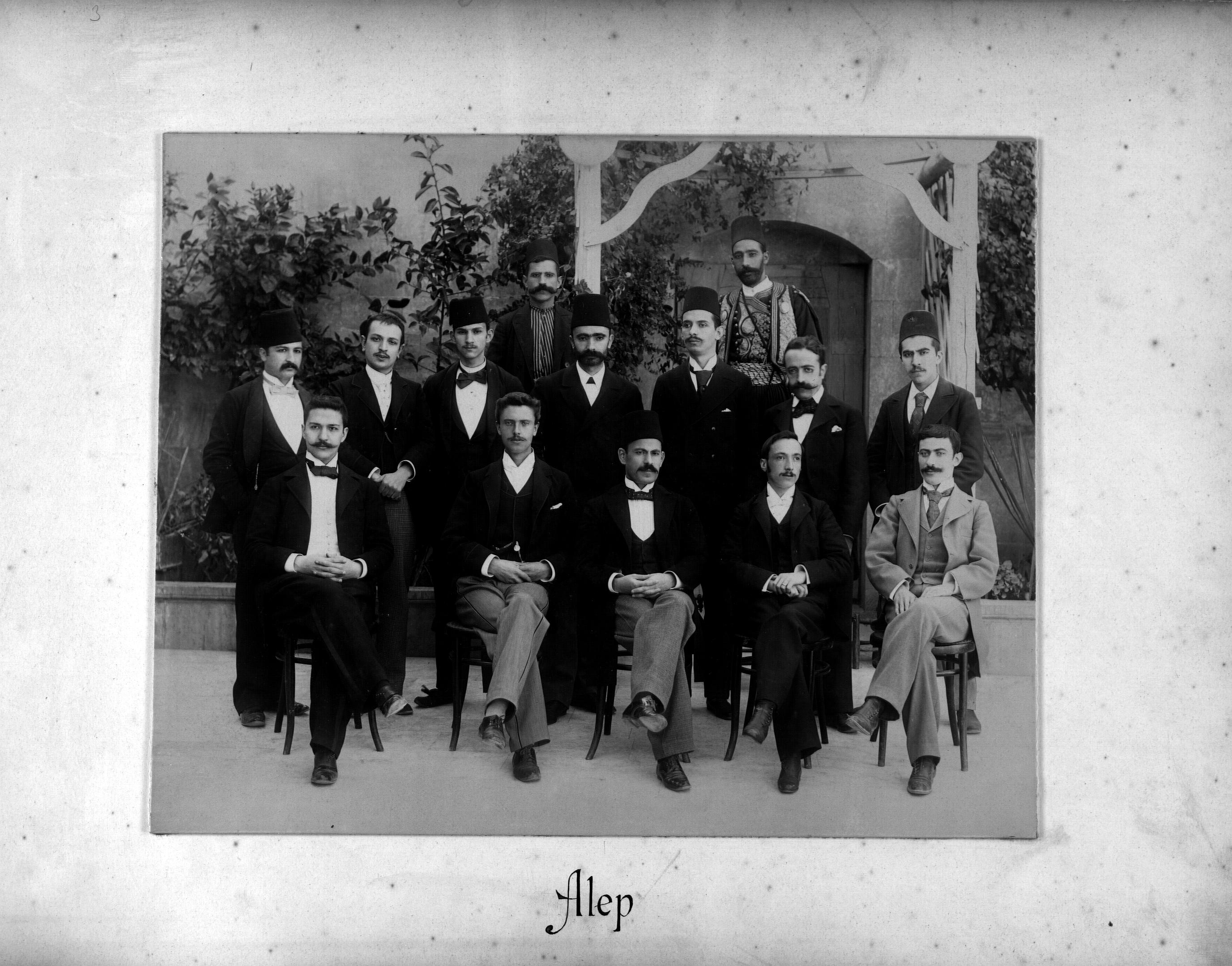
Staff at the Aleppo branch, 1895

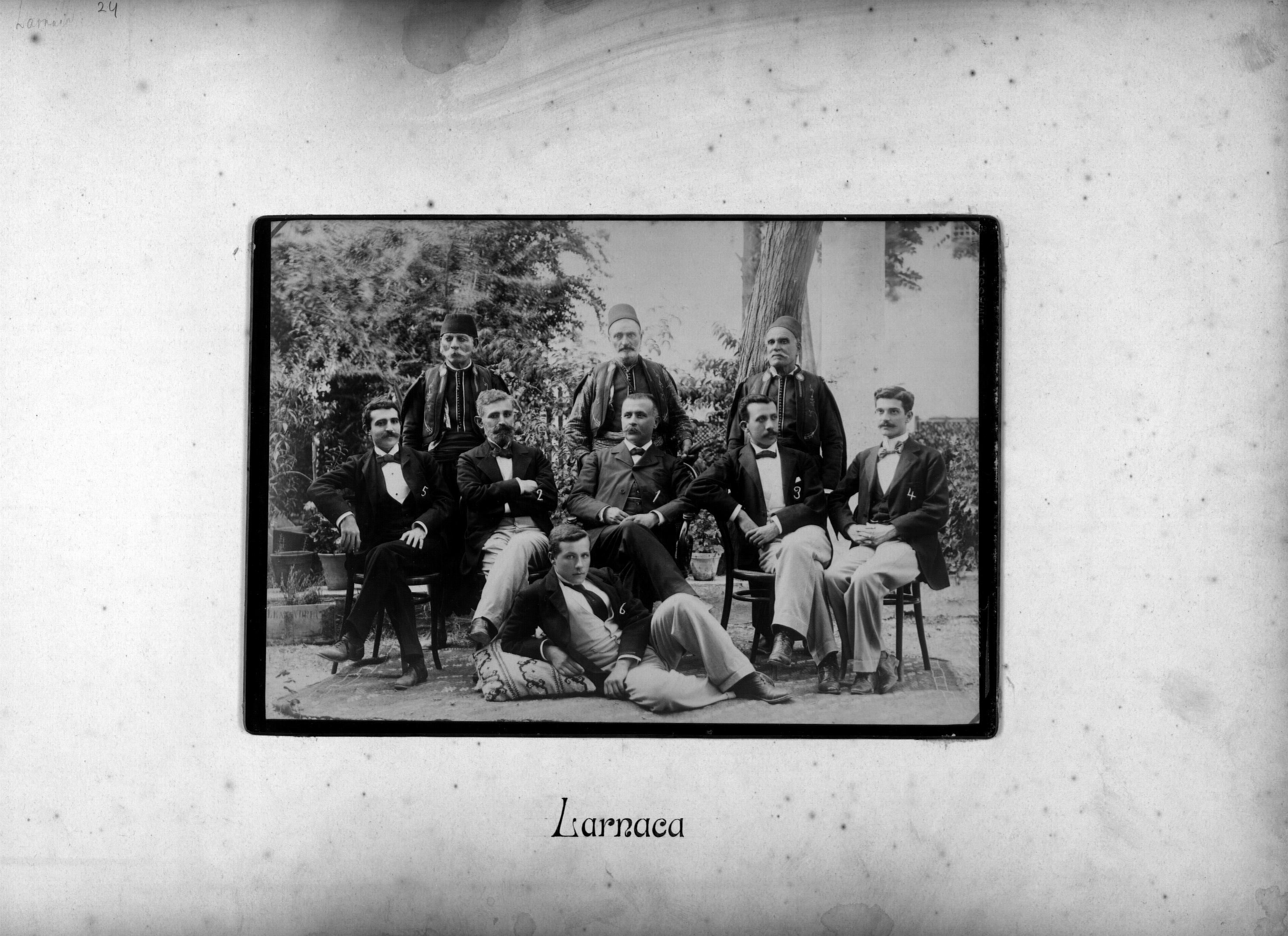
Staff at the Larnaca branch, 1895

The Ottoman Bank was set up as an institution in which people from multiple nationalities would work, even though the nationality of its most senior executives was the matter of numerous negotiations over the years.

The General Manager in Constantinople and their deputy were British or French, even though during World War I the BIO was administered by Ottomans of Armenian and Greek ethnicity as British and French nationals had to leave the country at war. The top executives and most of the branch managers were Europeans. Many mid-level officers and some branch managers were non-Muslim Ottomans of Greek, Armenian, Jewish and Arab Christian background. The bottom of the hierarchy was mostly Muslim Ottomans performing services as clerks, couriers, guards and doorkeepers.

Compared to the proportion of the different population of the empire, the number of the non-Muslim personnel was comparatively high, partly reflecting the fact that non-Muslims had better access to western language skills, accounting and banking education, and culturally western orientation until the forming of the Republic of Turkey.

=== Chairmen ===
==== First Ottoman Bank ====
- Austen Henry Layard (1856–1861)
- Thomas Charles Bruce (1861–1862)
- Sir William Clay (1862–1865)

==== BIO London Committee ====
- Sir William Clay (1863–1866)
- Austen Henry Layard (1866–1870)
- Thomas Charles Bruce (1870–1890)
- Charles Mills, 1st Baron Hillingdon (1890–1898)
- Charles Mills, 2nd Baron Hillingdon (1898–1907)
- Edward Ponsonby (1907–1920)
- George Goschen (1920–1924)
- Herbert Lawrence (1924–1943)

==== BIO Paris Committee ====
- Charles Mallet (1863–1902)
- Rodolphe Hottinguer (1902–1919)
- Jean de Neuflize (1919–1928)
- Raoul Mallet (1928–1937)
- Charles Rist (1937–1954)
- Emmanuel Monick (1954–1975)
- Bernard de Margerie (1975–1989)
- Gustave Rambaud (1989–1992)
- Hubert de Saint-Amand (1992–1996)

=== General managers ===
==== Constantinople / Istanbul ====
- Alexandre de Plœuc (1863–1868)
- Augustus Edward Hobart-Hampden (1868–1871)
- Morgan Hugh Foster (1871–1889)
- Edgar Vincent (1889–1897)
- Robert Hamilton Lang (1897–1902)
- Gaston Auboyneau (1902–1903)
- Charles de Cerjat (1903–1904)
- Jules Deffès (1904–1910)
- Paul Révoil (1910–1913)
- Arthur Nias (1913–1919)
- Louis Steeg (1920–1925)
- Jacques Jeulin (1966–1985)
- Aclan Acar (1996–2000)
- Turgay Gönensin (2000–2001)

==== Paris ====
From the 1880s to World War I, a Paris-based officer generally known as the administrateur délégué, starting with Théodore Berger who had earlier been the Secretary of the Paris Committee, played a key executive role in running the BIO in close coordination with the management based in Constantinople.

- Théodore Berger (1882–1900)
- Frank Auboyneau (1900–1903)
- Gaston Auboyneau (1903–1911), Frank's son
- Charles de Cerjat (1914–?)

== Buildings ==
=== Galata head office ===
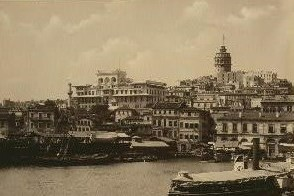
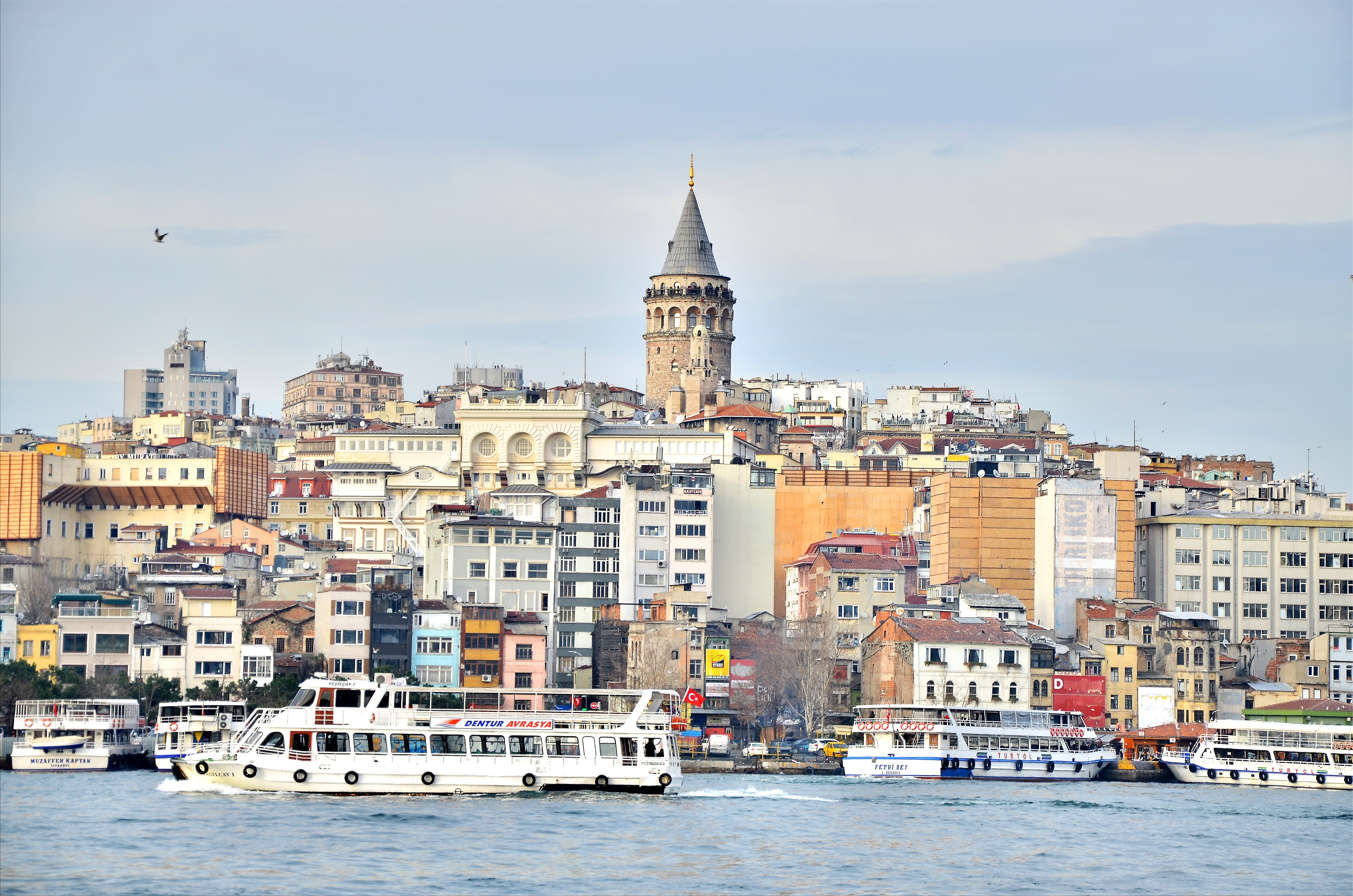
The neo-Ottoman south façade of the BIO Head Office beneath the Galata Tower, viewed from across the Golden Horn, 1893 and 2016

The Ottoman Bank (from 1856) and then the BIO (from 1863) were initially established on the top floor of Saint Pierre Han, a commercial facility that was a dependency of the Church of Saints Peter and Paul in Galata. In the late 1880s, the BIO decided to commission a new headquarters building slightly downhill on Voyvoda Street, now Bankalar Caddesi in Karaköy, which would also serve as headquarters for the Ottoman Tobacco Company in which the BIO was the main investor. Architect Alexander Vallaury designed the building for that purpose, with an east–west division between the two entities and separate street entrances (the BIO on No.11 and the Tobacco Régie on No.13); and a north–south stylistic division between the Western-looking street front and the neo-Ottoman, asymmetric rear façade that rose prominently above the Golden Horn. Thus, Vallaury's design embodied the BIO's unique identity as a bridge between Western European capitalism and Ottoman statehood.

The building was inaugurated on 27 May 1892 and was kept in use by the Ottoman Bank until 1999. From 1999 to 2009, it housed the Karaköy branch of Garanti Bank and its area directorates, as well as the Ottoman Bank Archives and Research Centre. It was then closed for refurbishment and reopened in November 2011 as the Galata site of SALT, a cultural institution that is funded by Garanti Bank, complementing SALT's other Istanbul site on İstiklal Avenue, formerly Platform Garanti Contemporary Art Center.

==== Ottoman Bank Museum ====
SALT operates the Ottoman Bank Museum in the building together with a café, a bookstore, an auditorium, temporary exhibition spaces, a public library, and an archive that is open to the public (Açık Arşiv). The twin neighboring building, on Bankalar Caddesi 13, has hosted the Tobacco Monopoly Administration (succeeding the Régie) from 1925 to 1934, and since 1934 has been the Istanbul branch of the Central Bank of the Republic of Turkey.

The Ottoman Bank Museum was initially opened in the building's basement and expanded into the upper floors in 2017. It displays objects and provides insight into the late Ottoman and early Republican period, including stock and bond certificates, accounting books, customer files, deposit cards, personnel files and photographs. The basement includes four bank vaults, the largest of which is two-storied and has been repurposed to display the banknotes and silver coins issued between 1863 and 1914 together with the story, design, registration and samples of each.

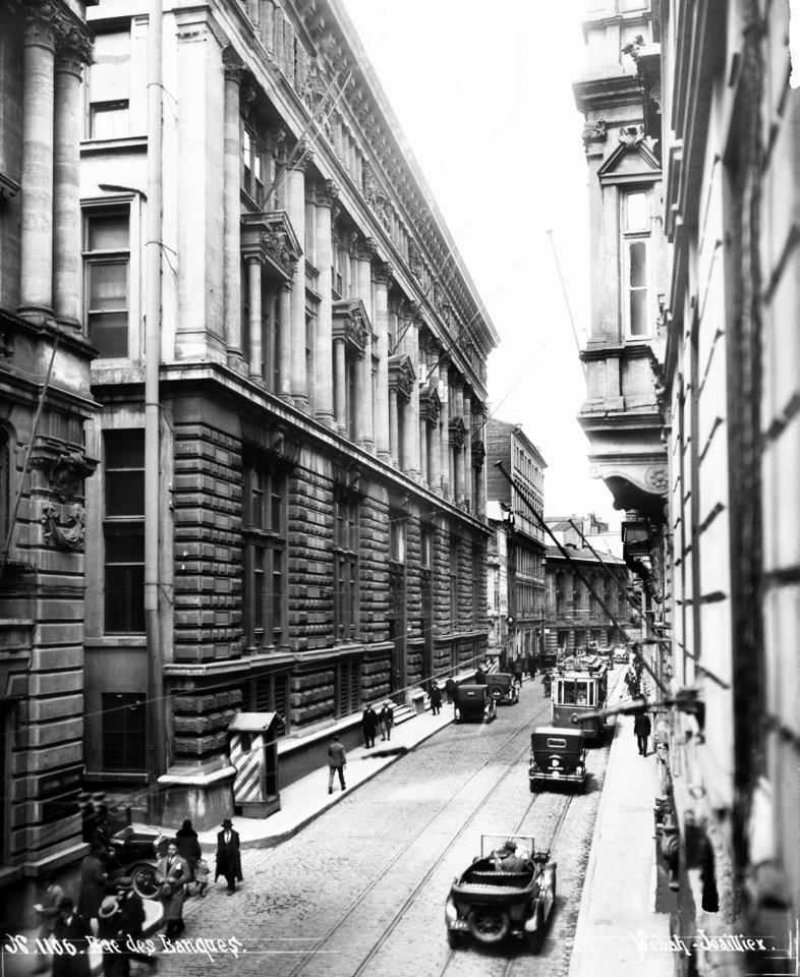
North front in the 1920s, photographed by Sébah & Joaillier

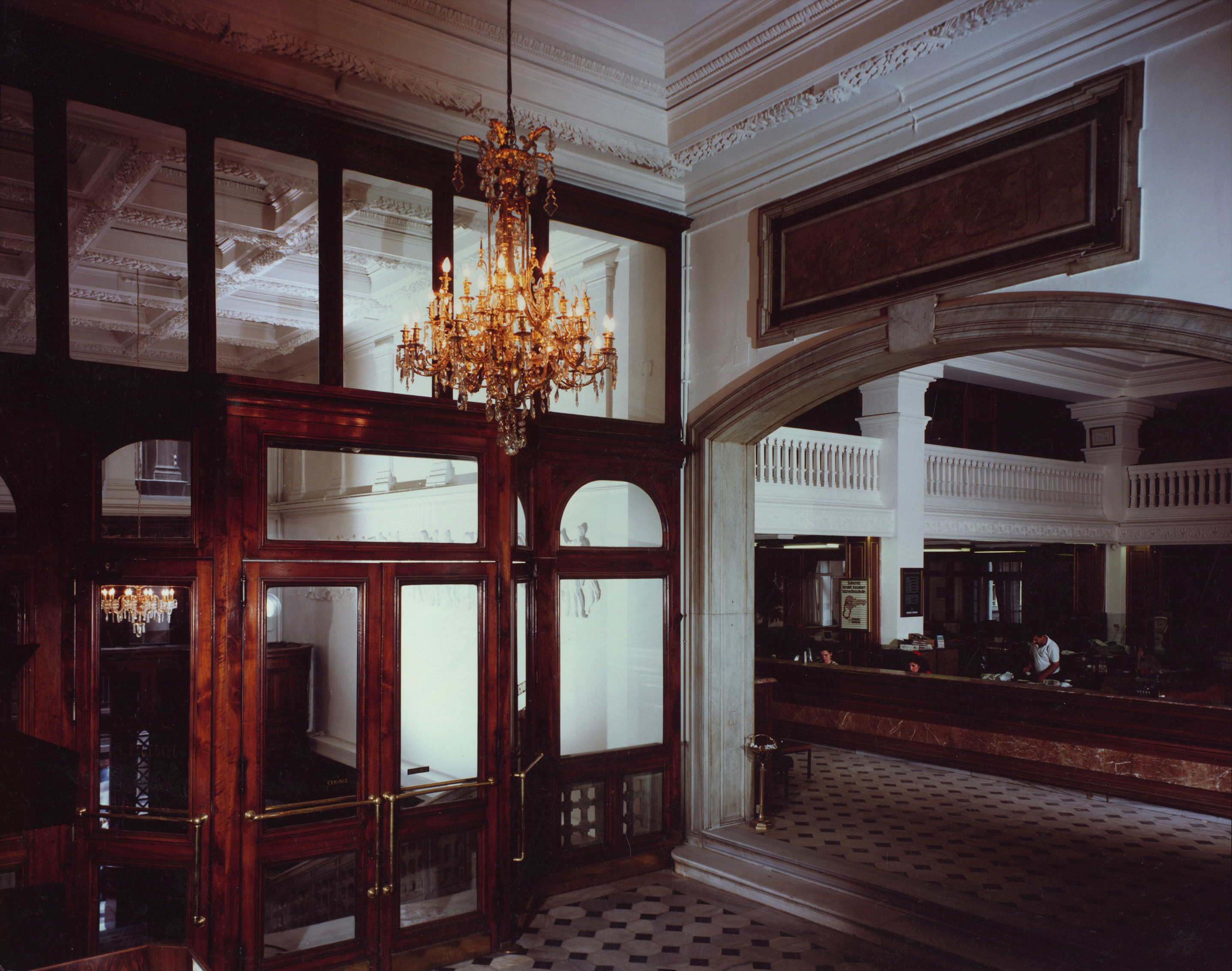
Entrance hall with inscription that reads "Who Earns Money Is God's Beloved"

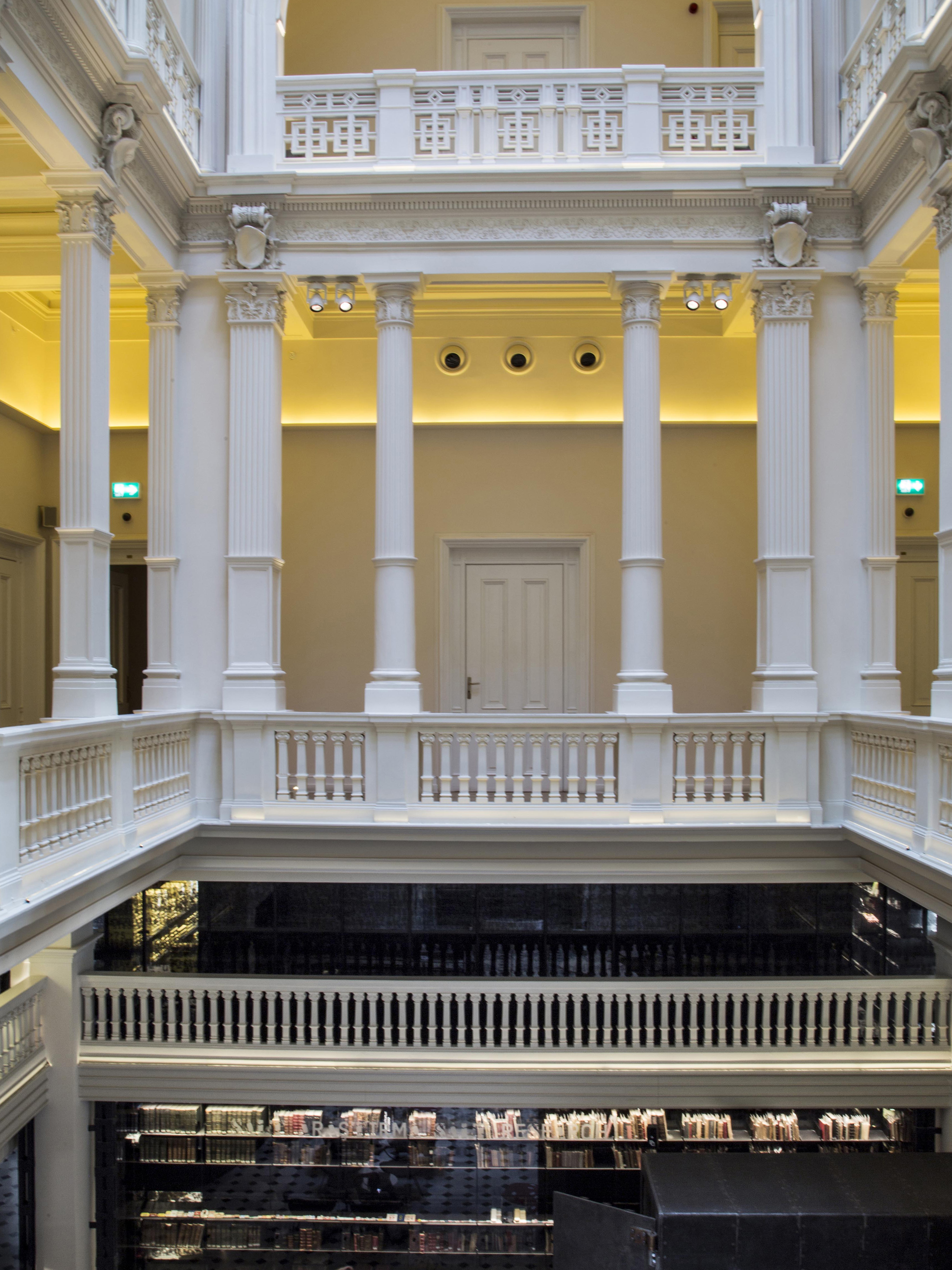
Interior atrium

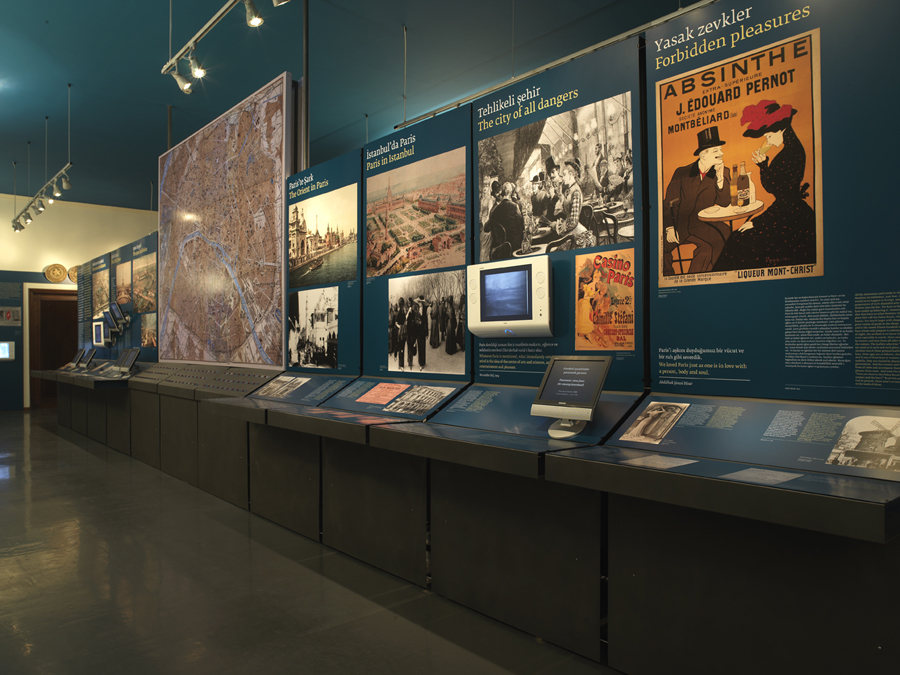
Exhibition "Prelude to the 1908 Revolution: The Ottomans in Paris", 2011

=== Branch offices ===
At the very outset in 1856, the BIO established itself in existing commercial malls or caravanserais, namely Saint Pierre Han in Galata, Khan Antoun Bey in Beirut, and Baltazzi Han in Smyrna. In 1863, it purchased a prominent mansion from Levantine businessman Jake Abbott for its new branch in Salonica which would be destroyed by terror attack in 1903. In later years, the BIO would usually rent an existing space when opening a new branch, and if it generated sufficient activity after some years, commission an in-house or external architect to erect a prominent new branch building.

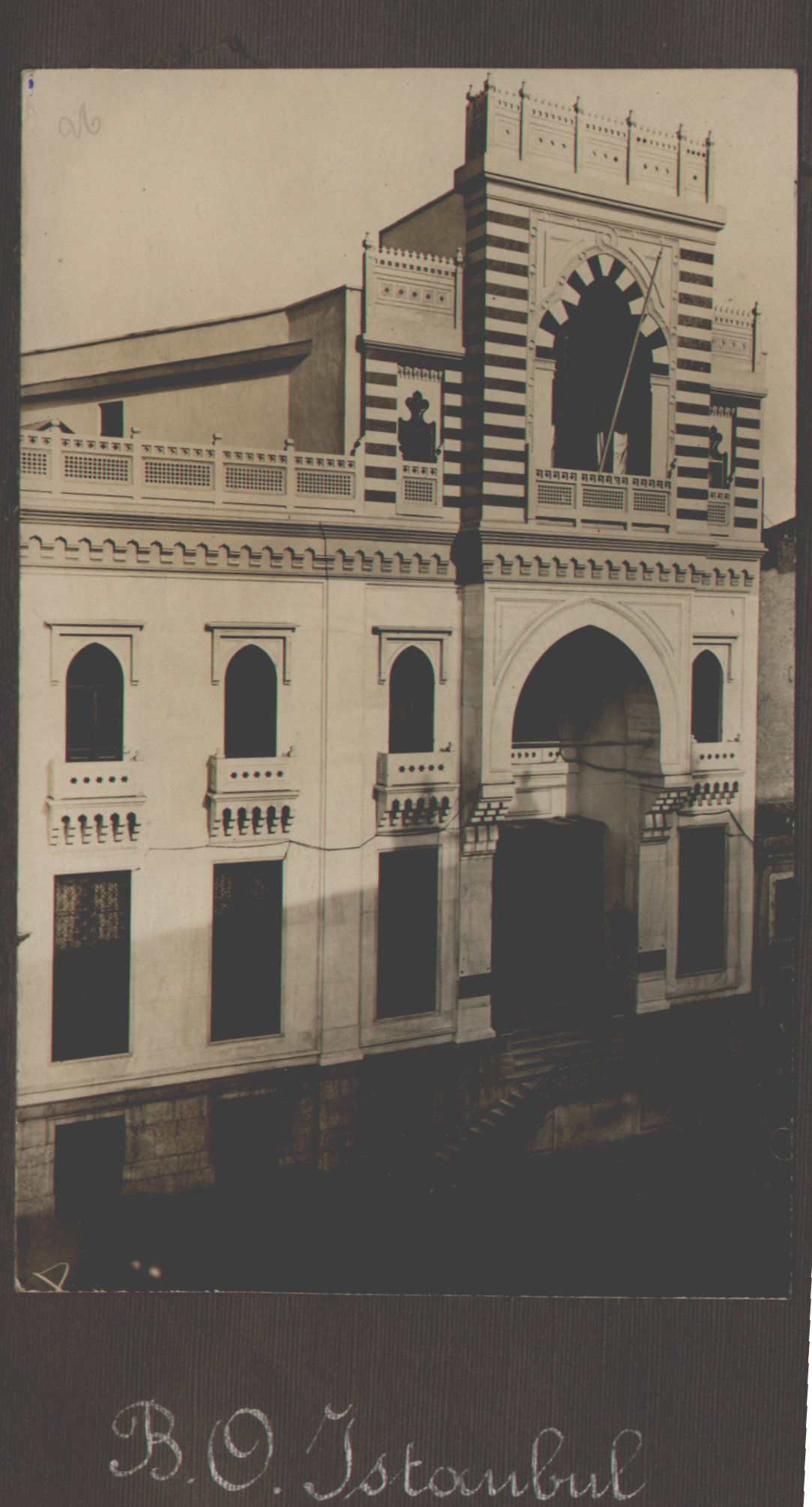
Branch in Stamboul behind Yeni Cami, 1906 extension on a design by architect Barouh

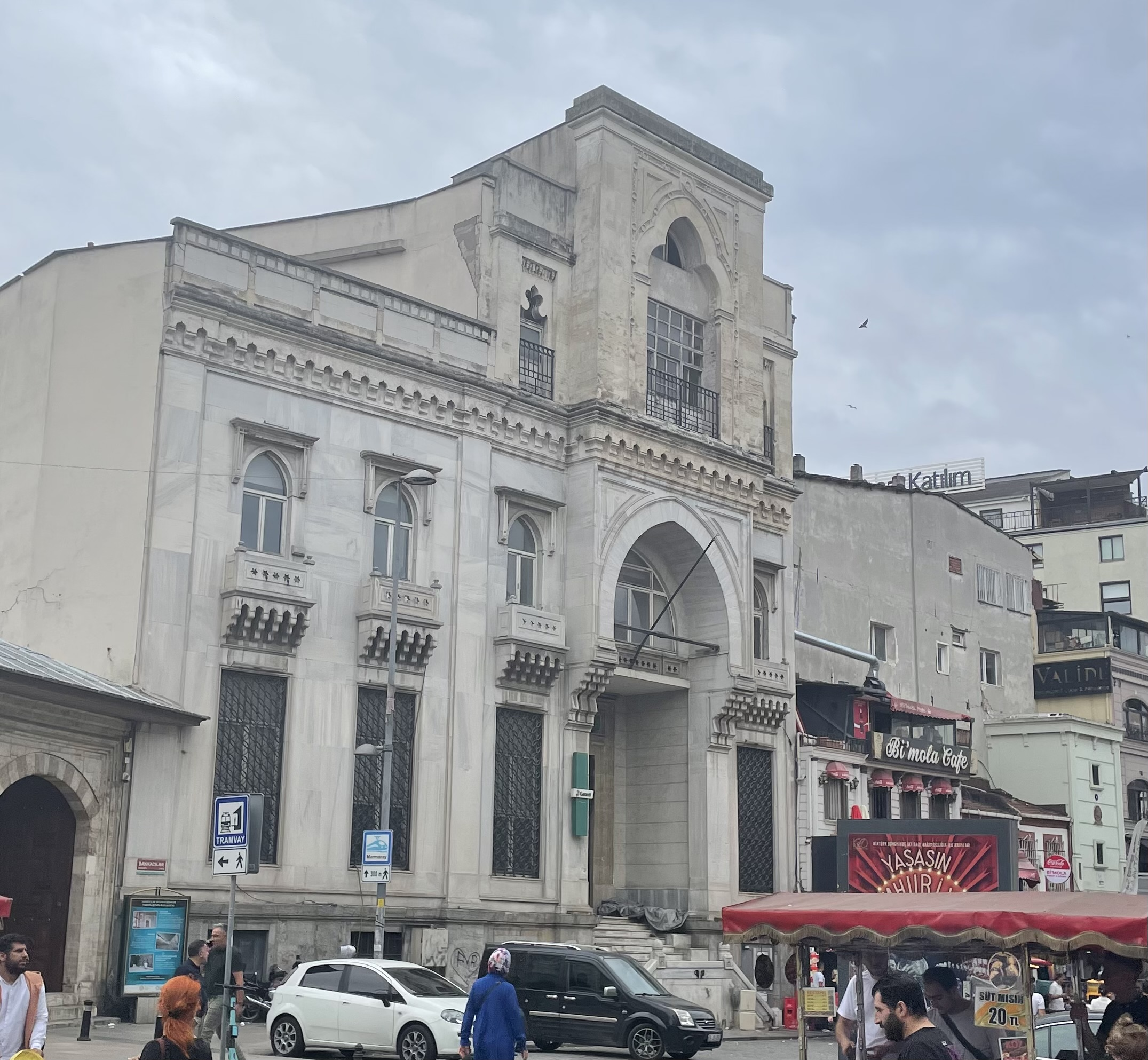
The same building in 2023, branch of Garanti Bank

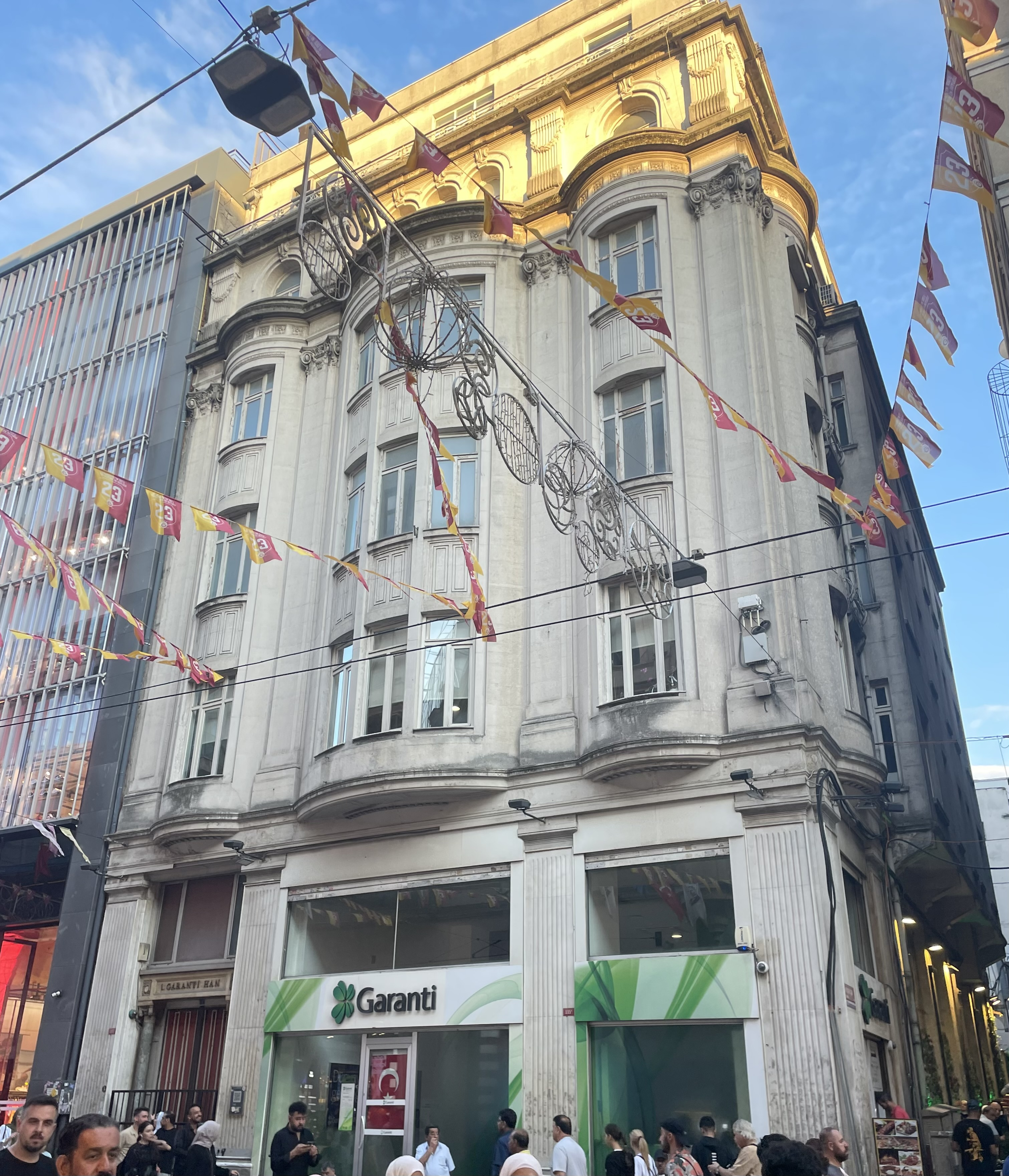
Former Pera branch on İstiklal Caddesi, later Garanti Bank

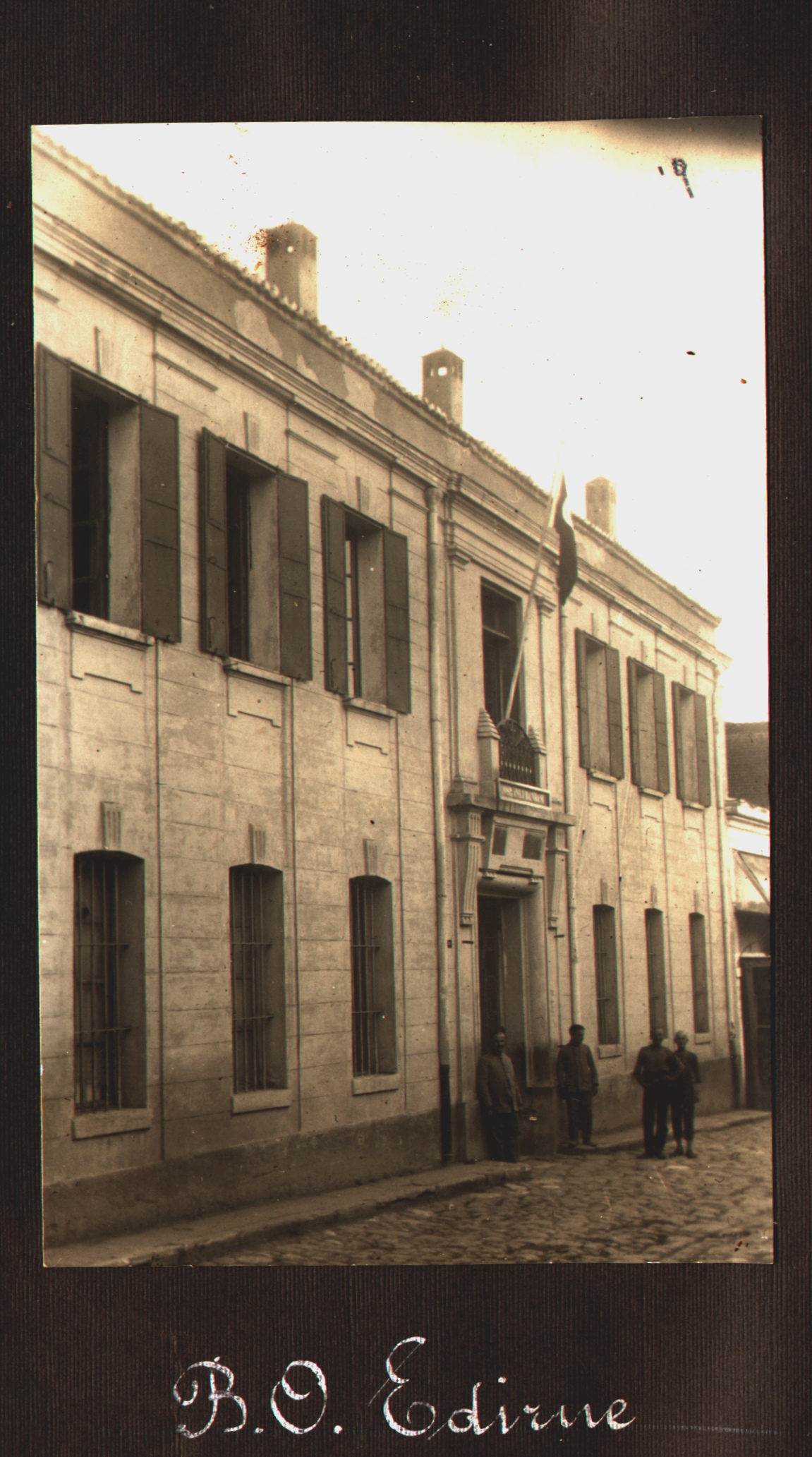
Branch in Edirne, 1930; no longer extant

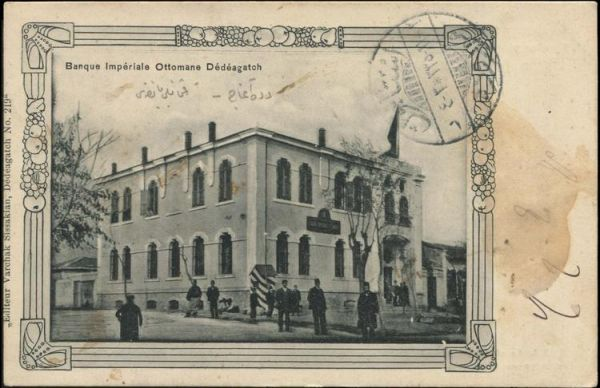
Branch in Dedeagac, early 20th century

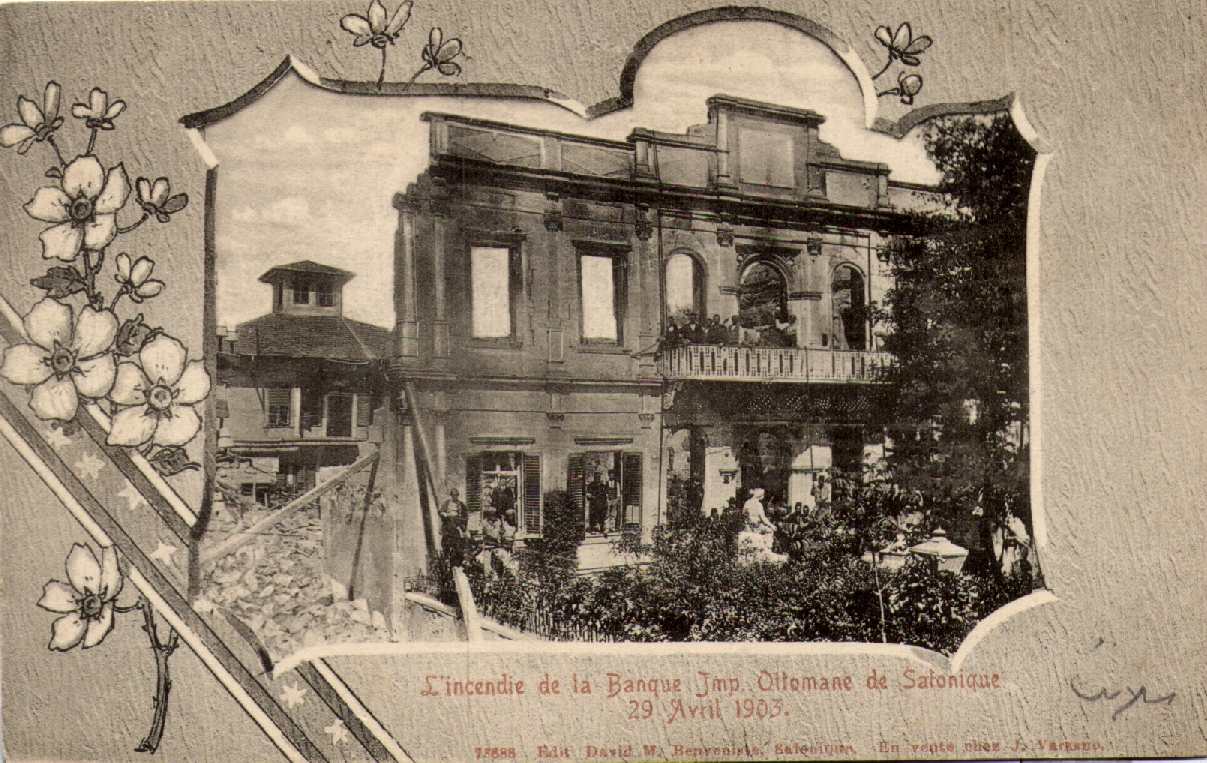
Branch in Salonica, after bombing in 1903 by the Bulgarian anarchist Boatmen of Thessaloniki

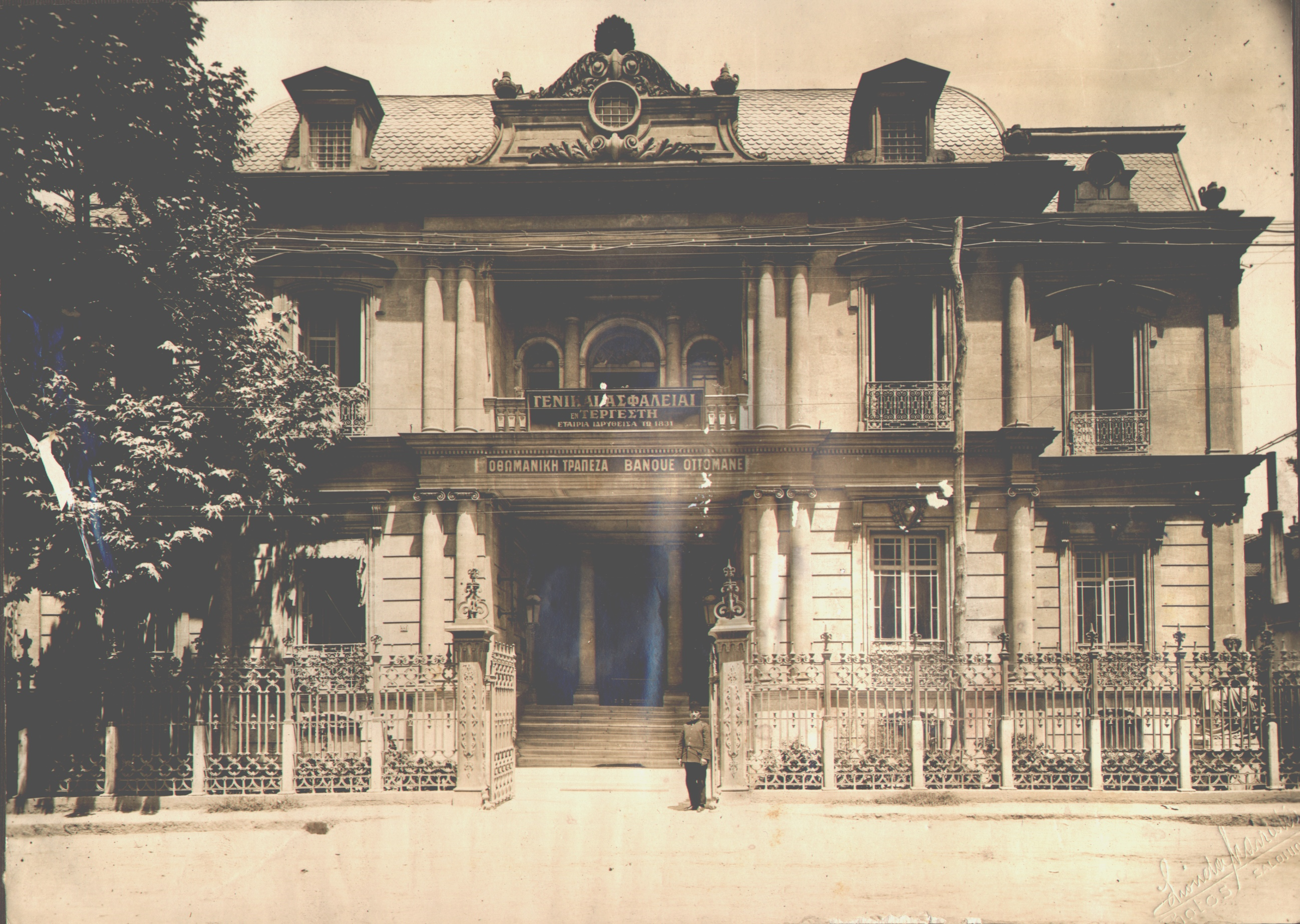
Salonica branch after reconstruction in 1904 on a design by Barouh and Amar

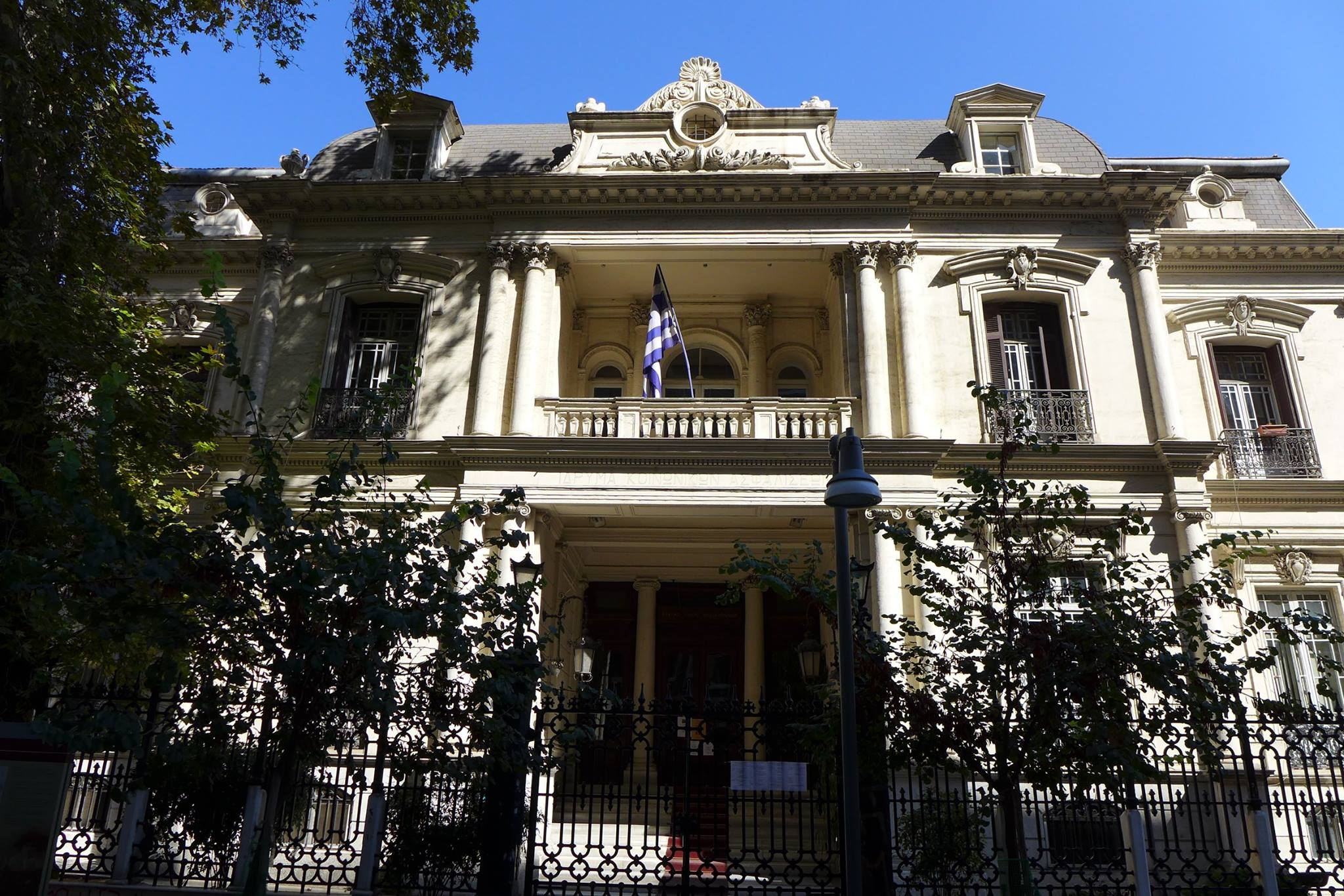
The same building in 2020, since 1983 State Conservatory of Thessaloniki

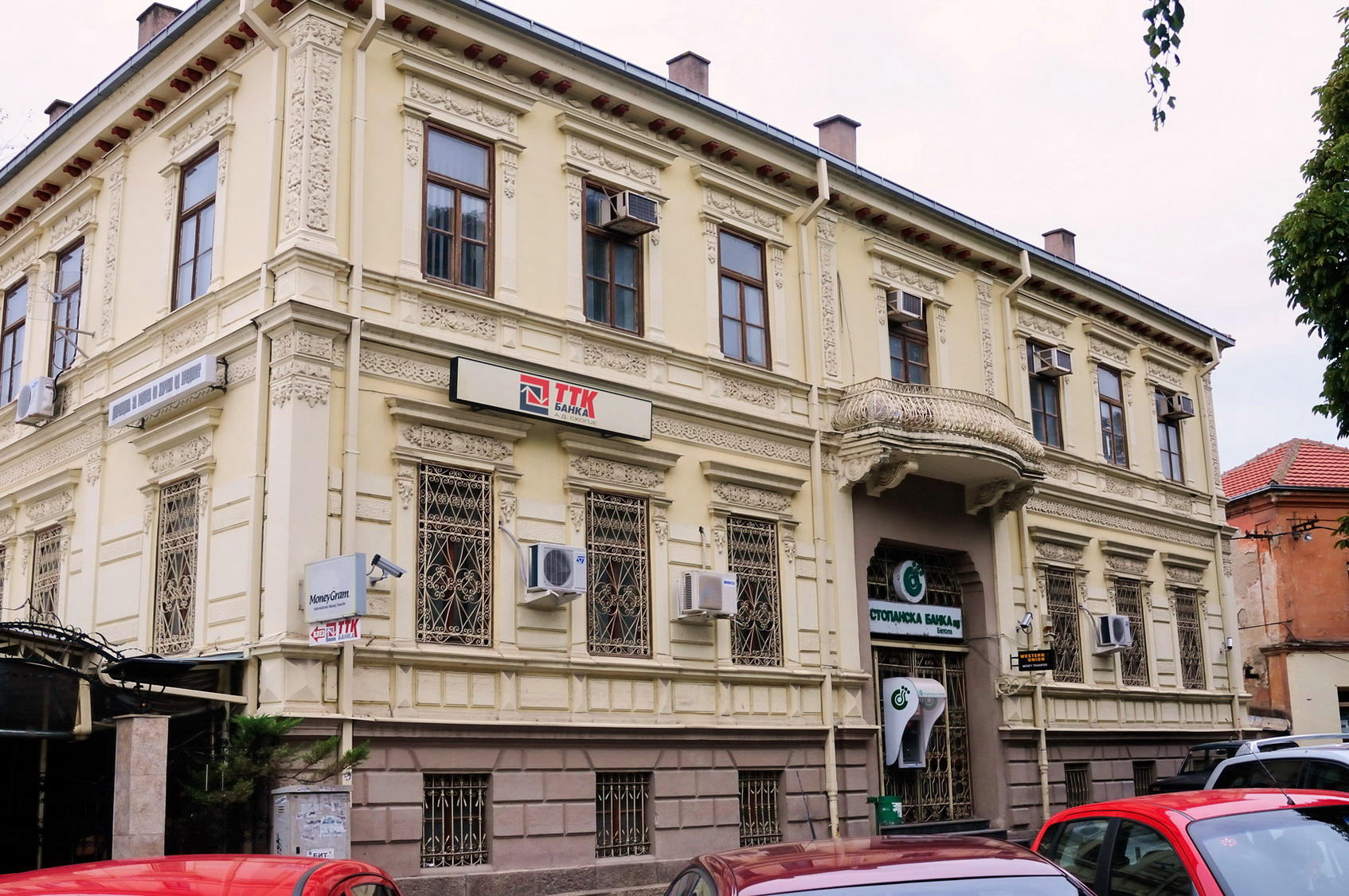
Former branch in Monastir, in 2014 branch of Stopanska Banka in Bitola

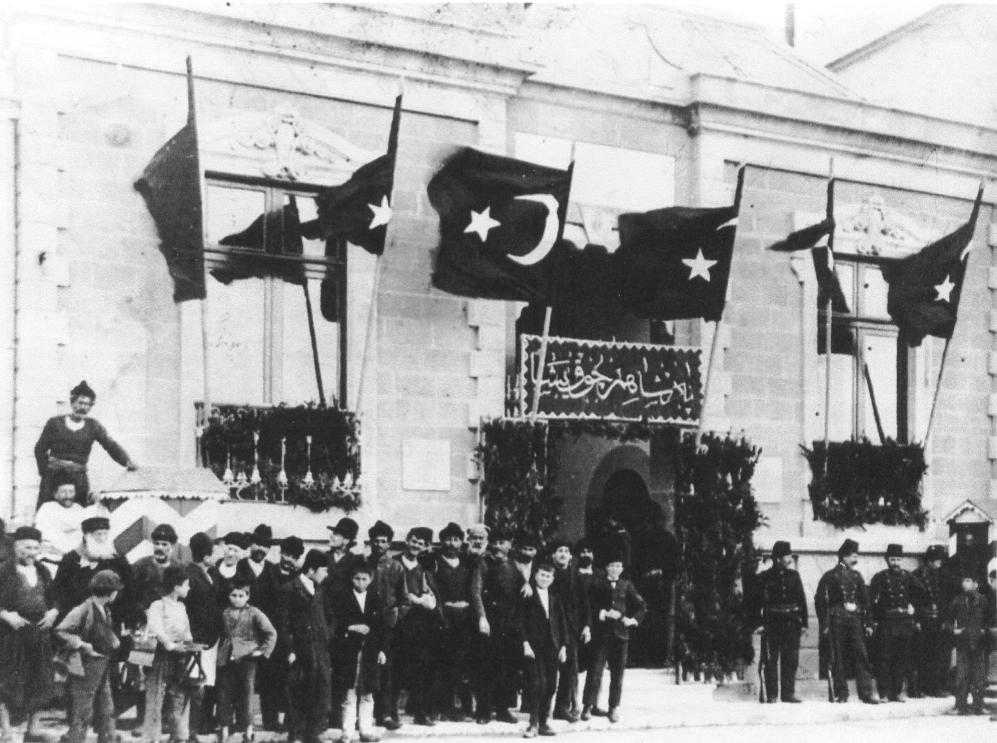
Branch in Mytilene, 1906

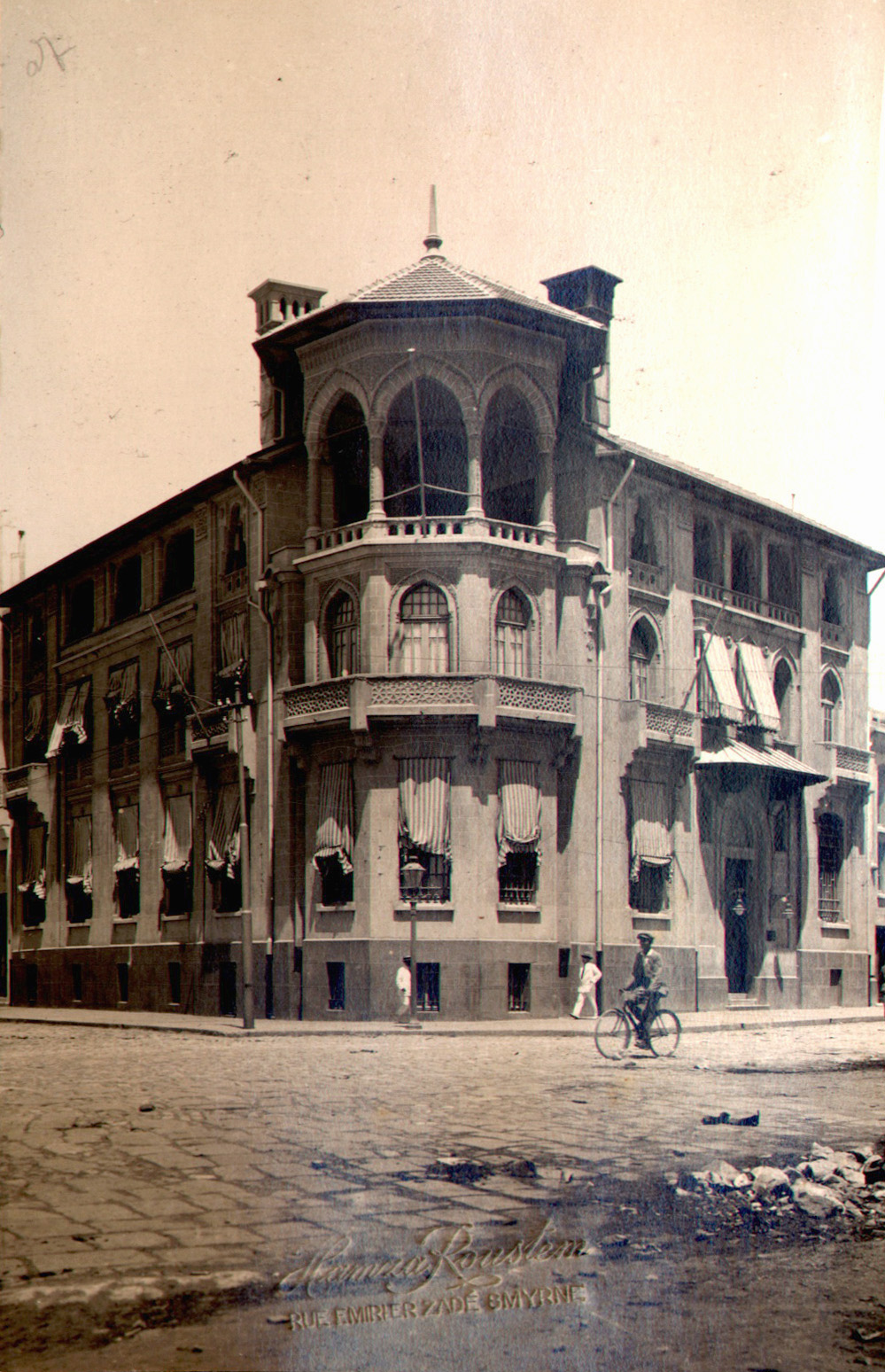
Branch in İzmir, built in the late 1920s on a design by Giulio Mongeri

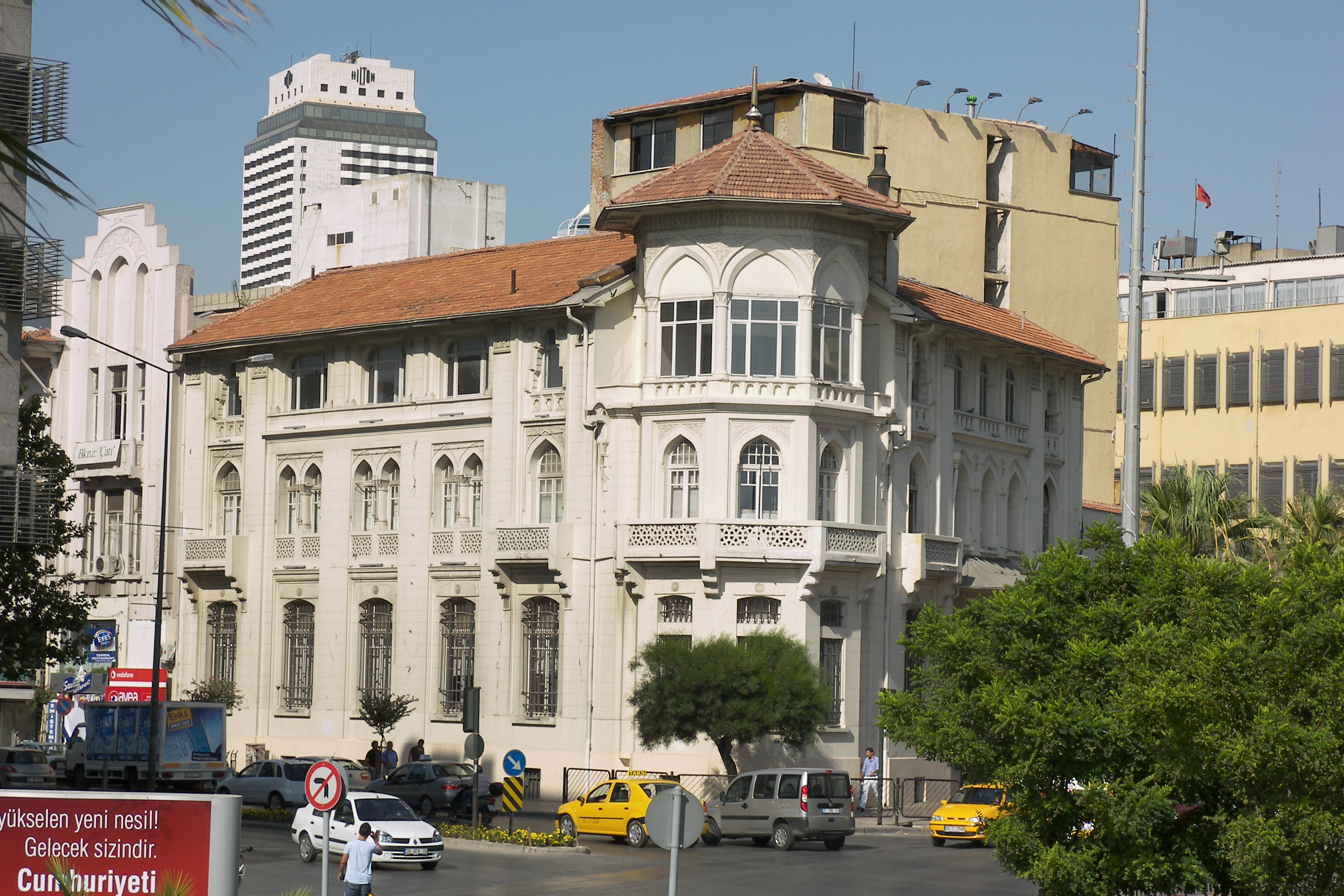
The same building in 2007, branch of Garanti Bank

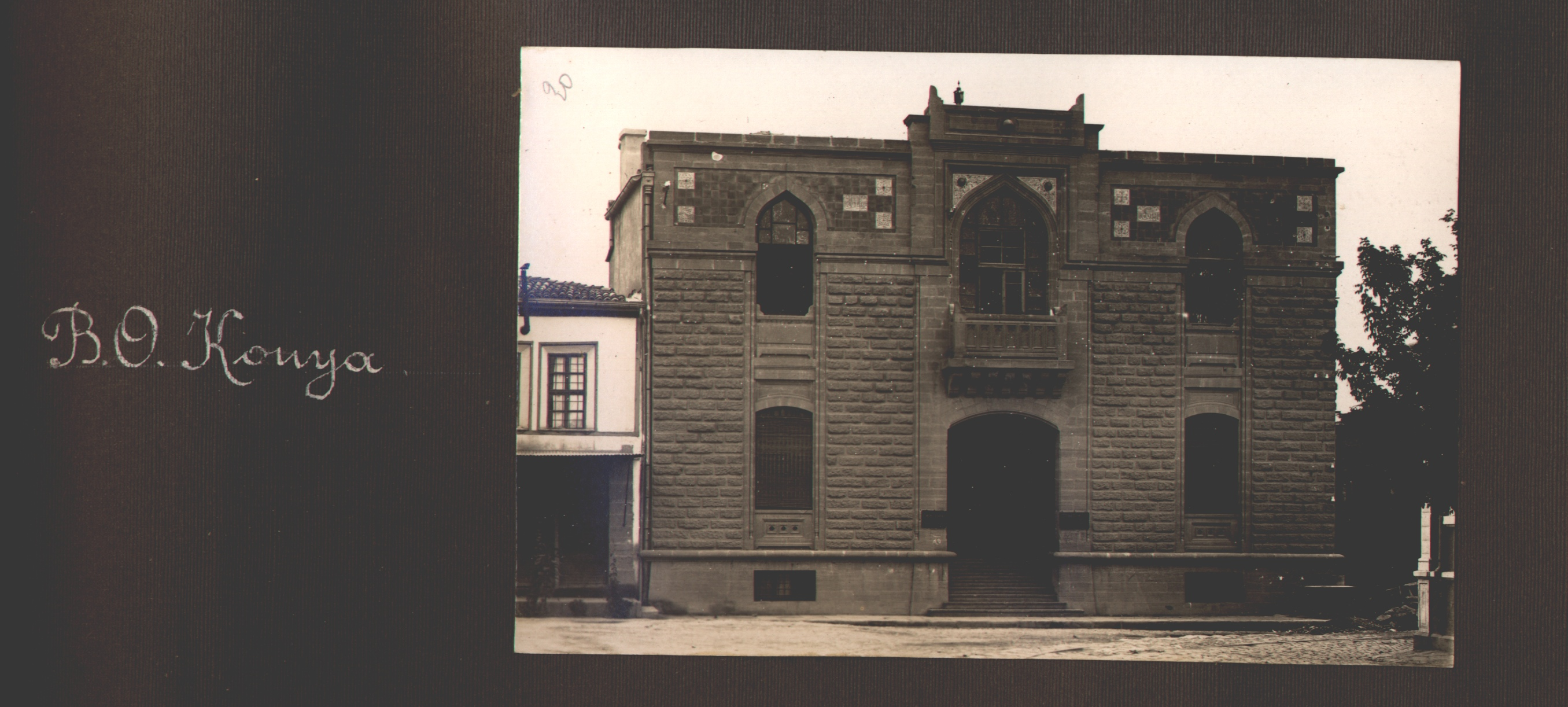
Branch in Konya, 1930

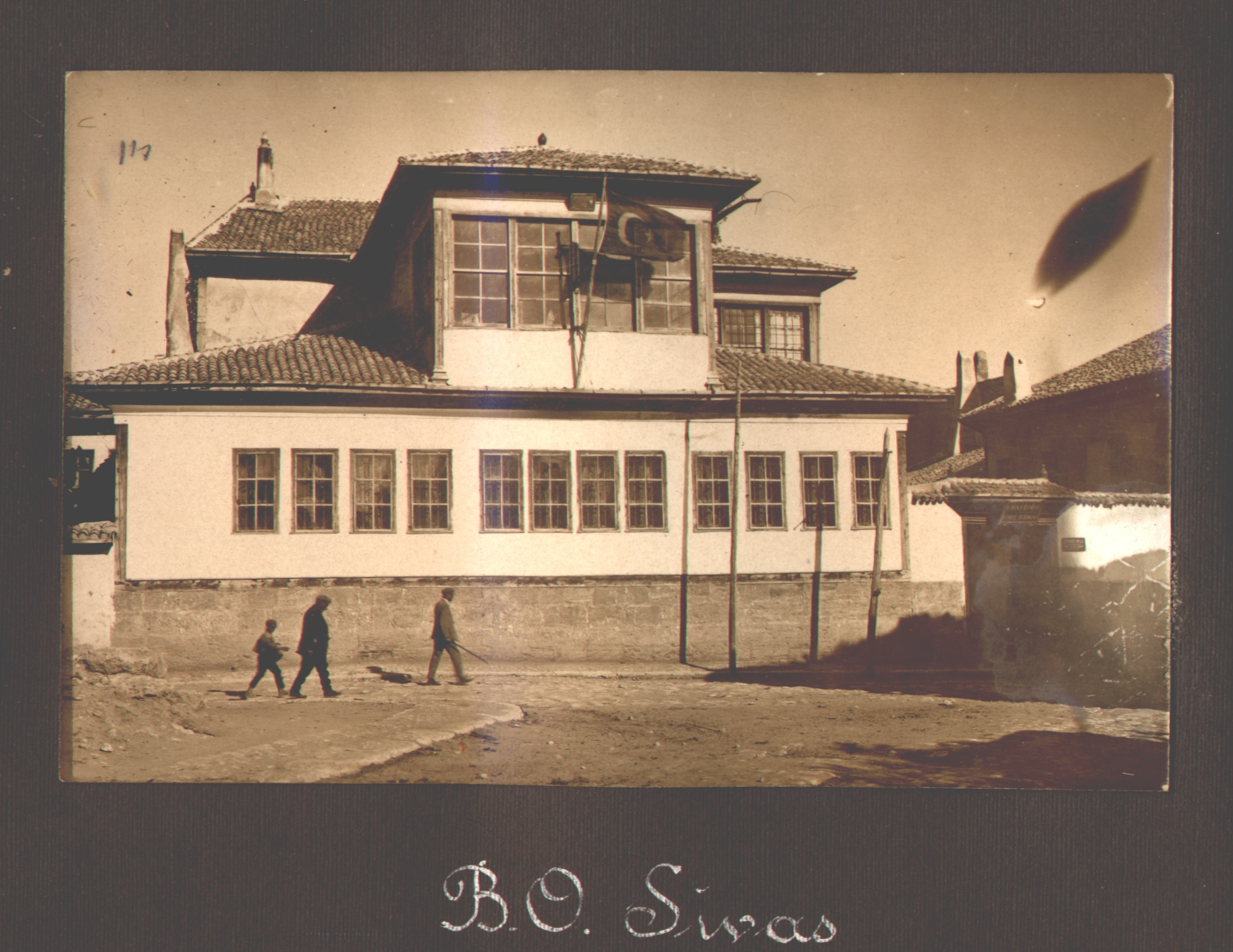
Branch in Sivas, 1930

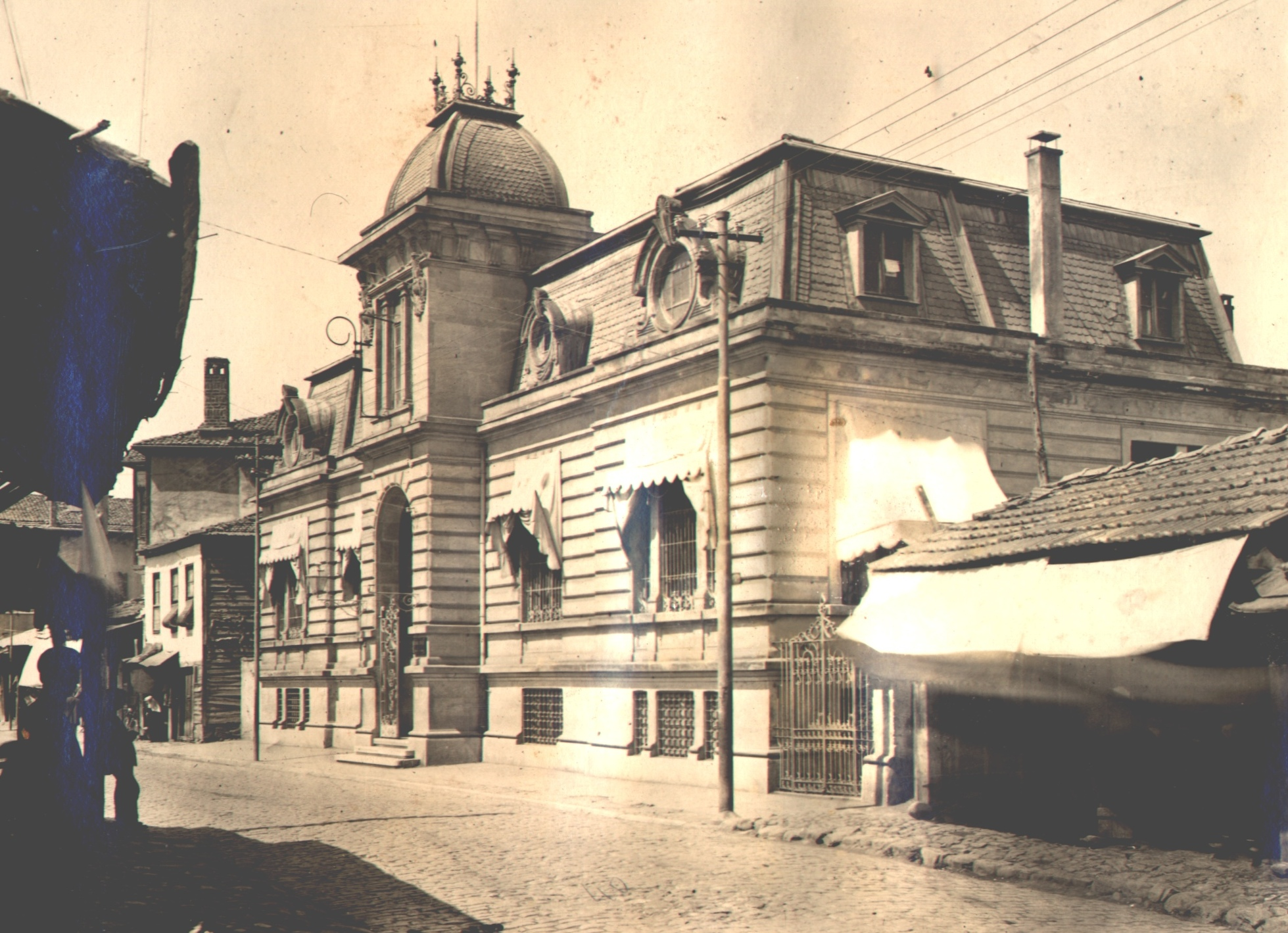
Branch in Samsun, 1930

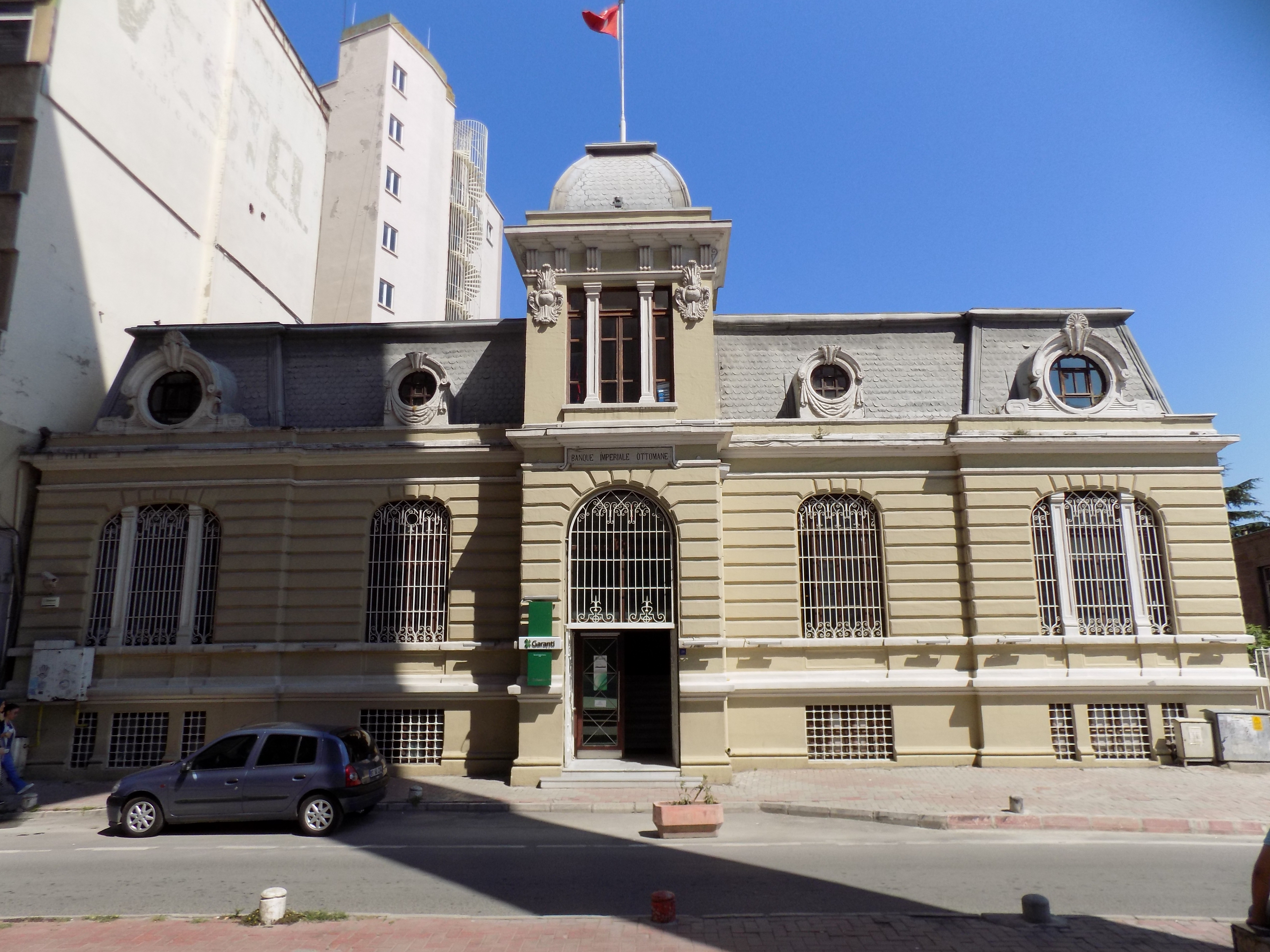
The same building in 2016, branch of Garanti Bank

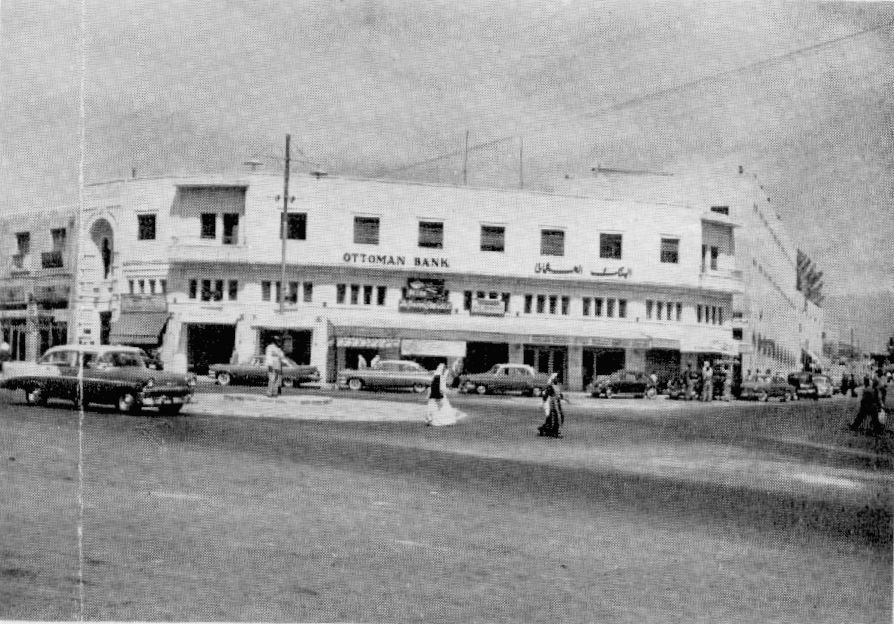
Branch in Jerusalem, 1960

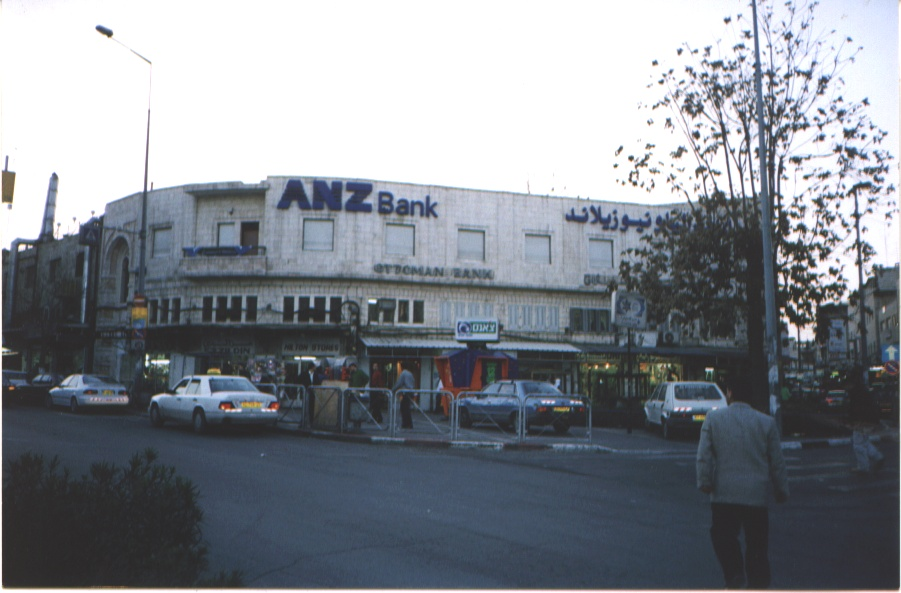
Same building in 1999, by then an ANZ branch still bearing the Ottoman Bank name; later Al-Hayat Medical Center

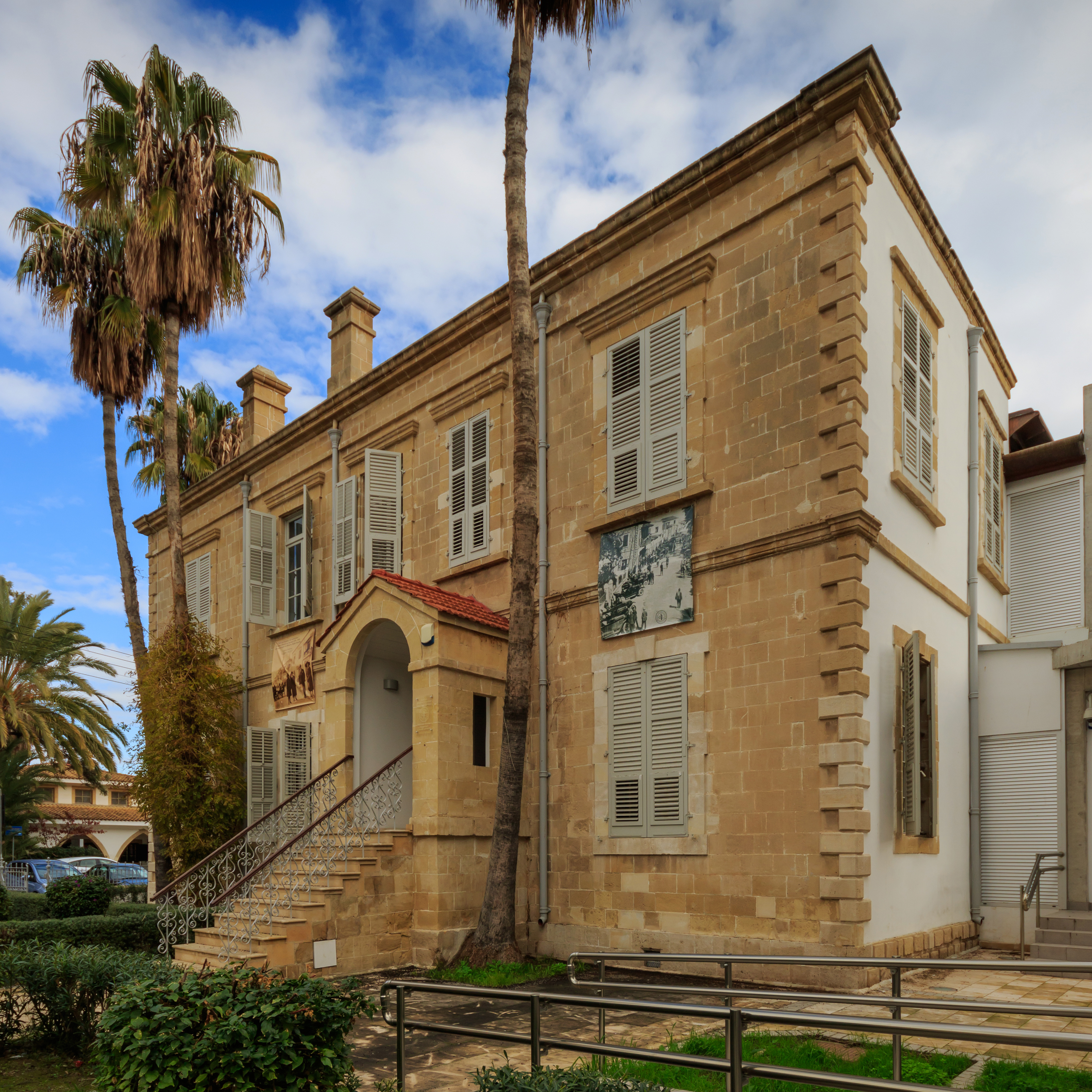
Former branch in Larnaca, 2017, hosting the Phivos Stavrides Foundation

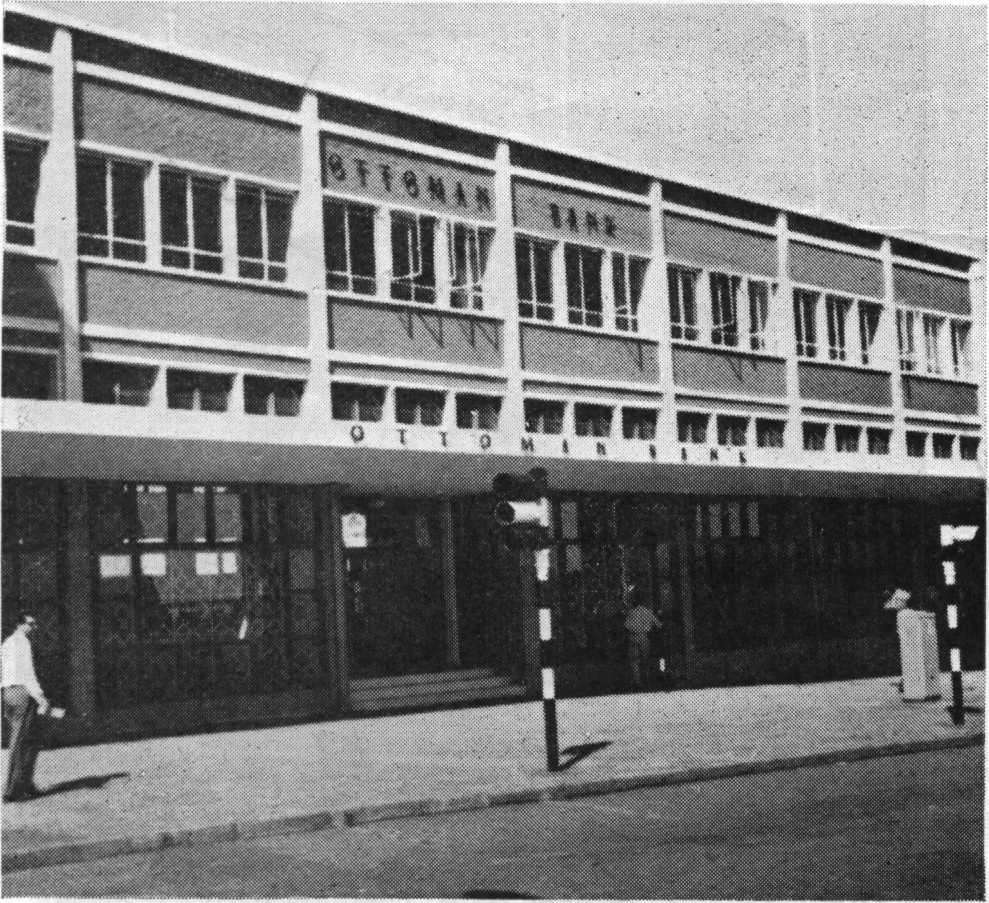
Branch in Kampala, 1960

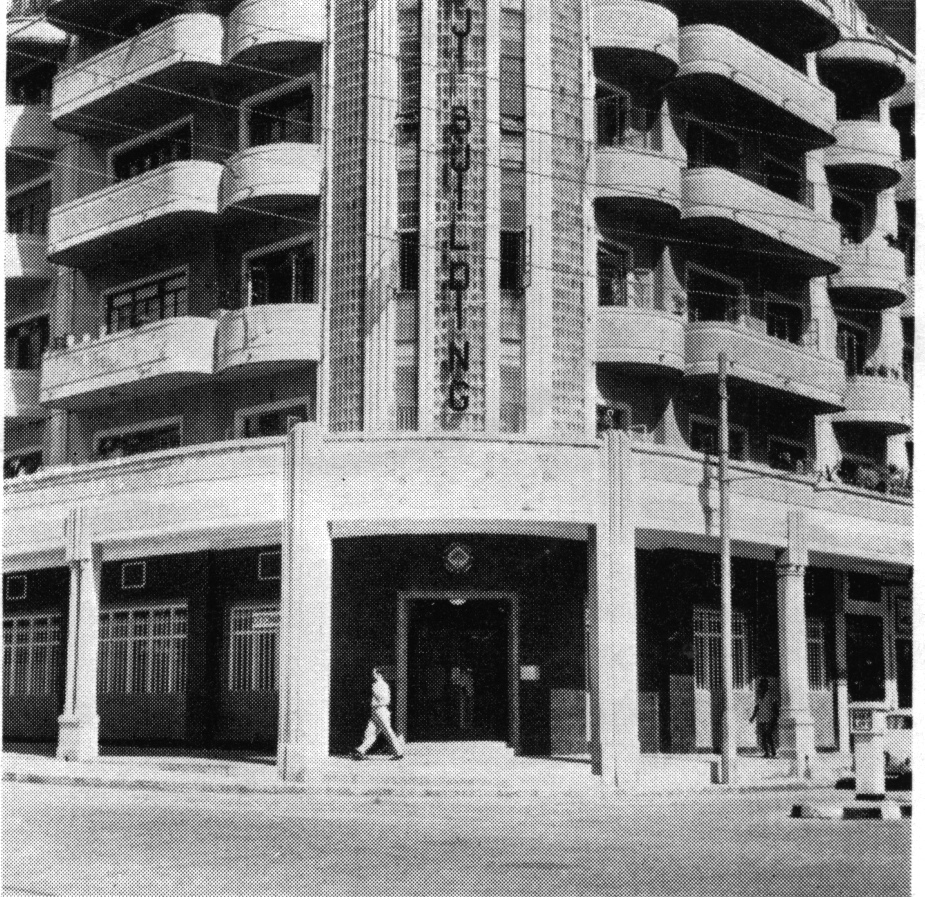
Branch in Dar es Salaam, 1960

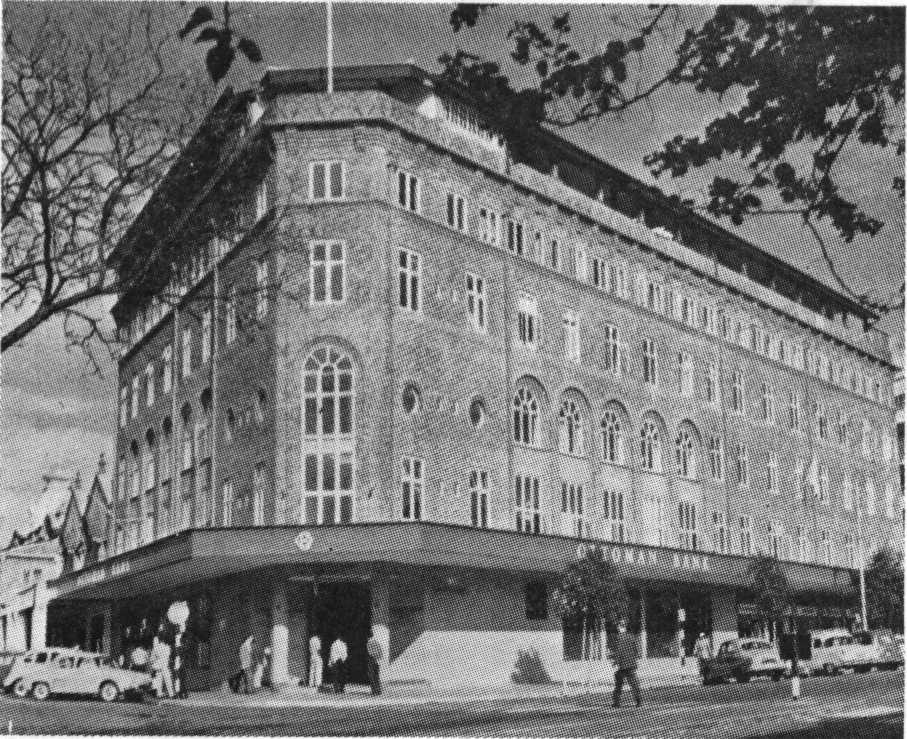
Branch in Nairobi from 1956 to 1969, designed by R. H. Robertson and built in the 1920s, branch of Stanbic

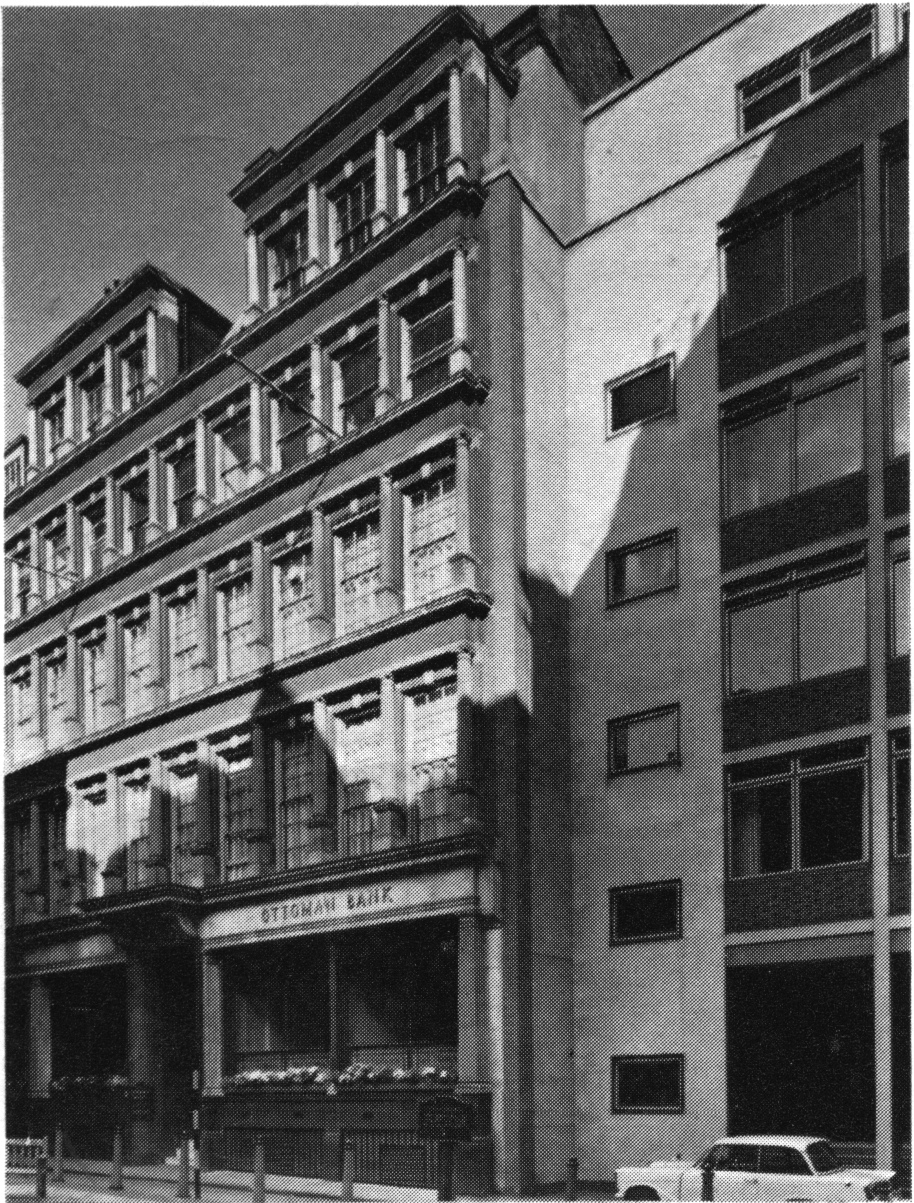
22 Abchurch Lane, the Ottoman Bank's London seat from 1948 to 1969, demolished since then

== See also ==
- Dar al-Mal
- Imperial Bank of Persia
- State Bank of Morocco
- Central Bank of the Republic of Turkey
- List of banks in France
