= Marcel Aubert =

French art historian (1884 – 1962)

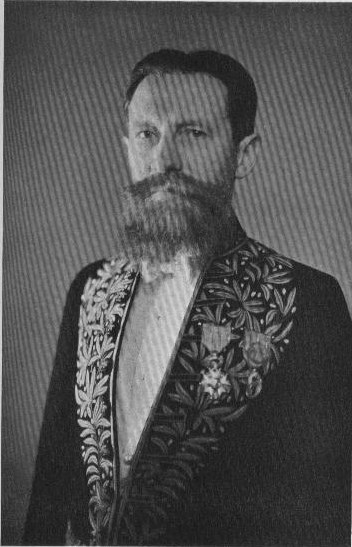
- Marcel Aubert in 1934
- Born: 9 April 1884; Paris, France
- Died: 28 December 1962 (aged 78); Paris, France
- Occupation: Art historian

Marcel Aubert (9 April 1884 – 28 December 1962) was a French art historian.

== Life ==
Marcel Aubert was the son of an architect who died when he was only seven years old. Following his studies at the Lycée Condorcet, he entered the École Nationale des Chartes where he wrote a thesis on the Cathedral of Senlis in 1907 and won the goodwill of his professor Robert de Lasteyrie.

He was named attache to the printing department of the National Library in 1909, and then assistant librarian in the prints department in 1911. He retained this post until 1919 (with three years' captivity in Germany).

In 1920, Aubert moved into the world of museums, taking a position at the Louvre as assistant to Paul Vitry in the department of Medieval, Renaissance, and Modern Sculpture. He succeeded Vitry as chief curator in 1940 and was soon named senior curator of the National Museums, a post that he occupied until his retirement in 1955, as well as being curator of the Musée Rodin and the Institut de France's Musée Condé in the Chateau de Chantilly.

In tandem with his career as a curator, Aubert taught throughout his working life. He succeeded to Eugène Lefèvre-Pontalis' chair of Medieval Archaeology at the École des Chartes in 1924, where he taught for nearly 30 years. He also taught at the École du Louvre as associate professor of Industrial Arts from 1921 to 1924 and as professor of Sculpture from 1940 to 1949, and at the École nationale supérieure des Beaux-Arts in the chair of French Architecture from 1929 to 1934 and the chair of Medieval Archaeology starting in 1937.

Aubert worked mostly in the field of medieval architecture, but he was also interested in sculpture. He is also considered one of the fathers of the history of stained glass. He showed that not only is architectural evolution a consequence of the tastes of the time, but also of the mastery of techniques. Aubert is counted among the first of the teachers of French art history.

Aubert was elected to the Académie des Inscriptions et Belles-lettres (Academy of Humanities) in 1934. In 1936, he was elected a Foreign Honorary Member of the American Academy of Arts and Sciences.

== Works ==
Only Aubert's monographs and his university works are listed here. For more information, see Bibliographie des travaux scientifiques de M. Marcel Aubert, Paris: Société française d'archéologie, 1948, which contains all his publications up till 1948, 297 in number.

- La Cathédrale de Senlis, thesis at l'École des chartes, 1905
- La Cathédrale Notre-Dame de Paris, doctoral thesis, published in Paris: Longuet. First edition, 1909; Second edition 1919.
- Monographie de la cathédrale de Senlis, Senlis: Dufresne, 1911
- Senlis, Paris: Laurens, 1912
- Mennetou-sur-Cher, Blois: éd. du jardin de la France, 1921
- Catalogue des sculptures du Moyen Âge, de la Renaissance et des Temps modernes [du musée du Louvre], Paris: Musées nationaux, 1922 (with Paul Vitry)
- edited L'architecture religieuse en France à l'époque gothique by Robert de Lasteyrie (posth.), Paris: Picard, 1926–1927
- Notre-Dame de Paris. Architecture et sculpture, Paris: Morancé, 1928
- L'art français à l'époque romane. Architecture et sculpture, Paris: Morancé, 4 vol., 1929–1948
- La sculpture française au début de l'époque gothique, Paris: ed. by Pégase, 1929
- Les richesses d'art de la France. La sculpture en Bourgogne, Paris: Van Oest, 1930
- L'abbaye des Vaux-de-Cernay, Paris, 1931
- Le Mont-Saint-Michel. L'abbaye, Grenoble: P. Arthaud, 1937
- Vitraux des cathédrales de France aux XIIe et XIIIe siècles, Paris: Plon, 1937
- L'église de Conques, Paris: Laurens, 1939
- L'architecture cistercienne en France, Paris: éd. d'art et d'histoire, 1943 (with the Marquise de Maillé)
- Rodin, sculpteur, Paris, 1952

== Bibliography ==
- Marcel Aubert (1884-1962), 1963, 11 p.
- Bibliographie des travaux scientifiques de M. Marcel Aubert, Paris : Société française d'archéologie, 1948, 41 p.
