= Deltour =

Deltour is a surname. Notable people with the surname include:

- Carlos Deltour (1864–1920), French rower
- Félix Deltour (1822–1904), French Latinist
- Hubert Deltour (1911–1993), Belgian racing cyclist
- Kedist Deltour (born 1997), Belgian model and beauty pageant titleholder
- Sylvaine Deltour (born 1953), French sprint canoer
