= Madeleine Michelis =

French teacher

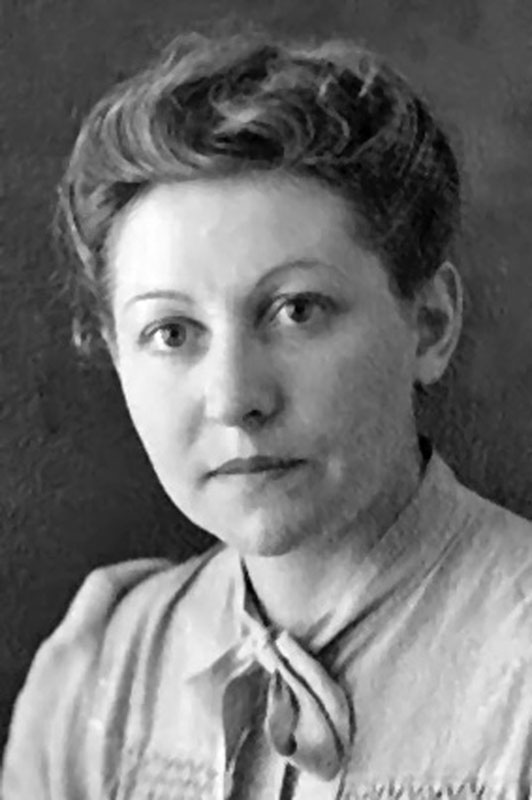
- Michelis
- Born: 22 August 1913; Neuilly-sur-Seine, France
- Died: 15 February 1944 (aged 30); Paris, France
- Military career
- Allegiance: France
- Branch: French Resistance
- Service years: 1940–1944
- Conflicts: Second World War
- Awards: Chevalier de la Légion d'honneur Médaille de la Résistance; Croix de guerre 1939-1945; Medal of Freedom; Righteous Among the Nations

Madeleine Michelis (22 August 1913 – 15 or 16 February 1944) was a French teacher and a member of the French Resistance during the Second World War.

== Early life ==
Michelis was born in Neuilly-sur-Seine; her father was an Italian cobbler and her mother, a governess, was from Alsace, her parents having left the region in the 1870s in order to retain French nationality. Her brother, Jean, was four years her junior. She was educated first at the local girls' school, then at the Lycée Condorcet in Paris and finally at the École normale supérieure de jeunes filles at Sèvres. She was a member of the Jeunesse Étudiante Chrétienne, a Christian youth organisation.

== Wartime activities ==
Her first teaching post was at the Lycée de jeunes filles at le Havre, but she was forced to leave in 1940 because of the bombing. She was transferred to the Lycée Victor Duruy in Paris, and subsequently to the Lycée d’État de Jeunes Filles d'Amiens, later renamed the Lycée Madeleine Michelis d'Amiens in her honour. In 1942, she gave shelter to a Jewish girl, Claude Dalsace, whose father had been deported; Michelis managed to get her to safety in the "zone libre".

As a member of the Libération-Nord and the "Shelburn" network, Michelis was involved in the rescue of airmen and escaped prisoners who found their way to the countryside of Picardy. It was for her actions in the period between November 1943 and February 1944 that she was posthumously awarded the Medal of Freedom by the United States. She was arrested at Amiens railway station on 12 February 1944 and taken to the Gestapo headquarters at the Lycée Montaigne in Paris for questioning. The official version of her death given by her superiors in the Resistance was that she had committed suicide on 15 February rather than face further interrogation. Two other teachers arrested at around the same time, Thérèse Pierre and Suzanne Blin, also died while under arrest.

The tortures inflicted on her included waterboarding. On 15 February, she told other prisoners that she had been placed in an icy bath and could not warm up afterwards. Some stated that, the next day, she was again taken for interrogation; she was never seen alive again. Yet another version of her death was given by General Charles de Gaulle in her medal citation: that she was strangled by her captors. Jean-Louis Crémieux-Brilhac, a member of the Free French Forces, stated that he was notified of this by telegram.

== Legacy ==
The state of Israel posthumously conferred on her the title of Righteous Among the Nations, on 24 November 1997. Streets in Paris and her home town of Neuilly-sur-Seine have been named Rue Madeleine Michelis in her honour. Letters written by Michelis are now held by the Institut d'histoire du temps présent. A high school in Amiens, France (Lycée Madeleine Michelis) is named after her.
