= François Peyrard =

French mathematician, educator and librarian

- Born: 20 October 1760; Saint-Victor-Malescours, France
- Died: 3 October 1822 (aged 61); Paris
- Known for: Ancient Greek mathematical works expertise
- Scientific career
- Fields: Mathematics
- Institutions: École Polytechnique
- Academic advisors: Gaspard Monge, Joseph-Louis Lagrange, Jean Baptiste Joseph Delambre

François Peyrard (1760–1822) was a French mathematician, educator and librarian. During the French Revolution, he was involved in the committee that reformed the French educational system. He was one of the founders of the École Polytechnique and its first librarian.

== Biography ==
=== Early life ===
Born in Velay (now Haute-Loire), he was a student at the Collège of Le Puy-en-Velay. Refusing to become priest, he first enrolled in the Gardes françaises in Paris. The notorious lack of discipline of this corps enables him to study "with the best teachers and well-known scientists" of Paris. He then started a career in 1786 as mathematics teacher.

=== 1789-1794 : among the scientists of the French Revolution ===
He embraced immediately the ideas of the French Revolution. He was a member of the Jacobin Club (Club des Jacobins) and of the "council of Paris" in 1792. The "Biography" of Michaud mentions he was "an ardent revolutionary" linked with activists of atheism (Cloots, Marechal).

1793 was a key year for him. Condorcet in charge of reforming the French Education was banned then executed and the educational system was wrecking. He was the presenter of a project of reform to a commission of top-level scientists including Vandermonde, Berthollet, Fourcroy, Monge, Lagrange. This project was the start for the creation of several high-schools and institutes. He had an important role during the period of the Convention : in charge with Monge and Lagrange to select the mathematics teachers for the newly created high-schools ("Grandes Ecoles"), in charge to evaluate "war weapons" and to conduct experiments on "projectiles shapes". In 1794, he attended a "representative of the nation" in a survey of "coal mines and weapons manufactures". The general inspector Monnet (Antoine-Grimald Monnet) met him during this mission and left a description of him in a memoir : " an extremely exalted head...and a witty person that never lacks of presence of mind ".

=== 1795-1804 : creation of the library of the École Polytechnique ===
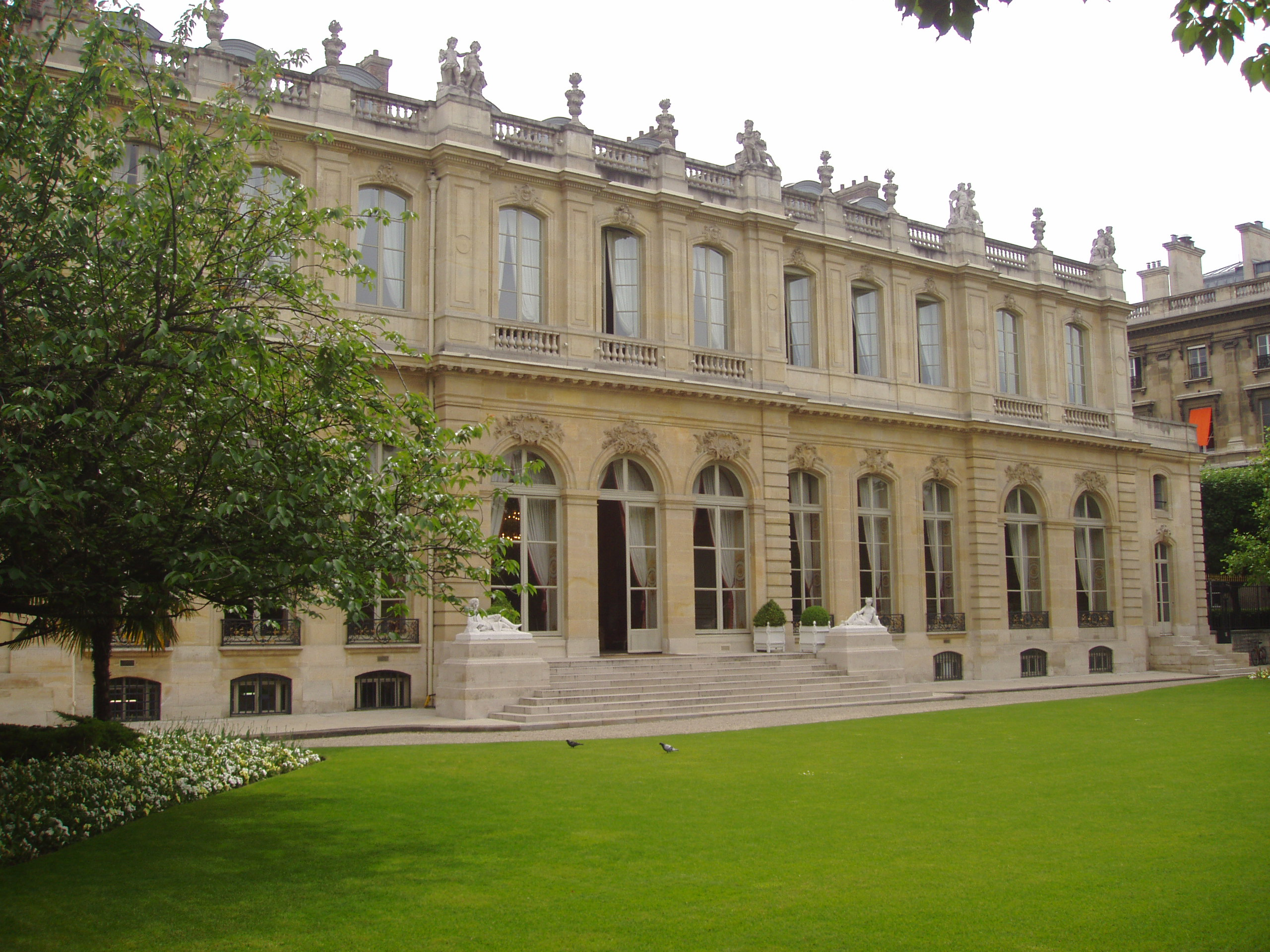
Peyrard lived and worked at the Hôtel de Lassay, where the École polytechnique was hosted between 1795 and 1805

He is appointed in April 1795 librarian of the École polytechnique (official name since September 1795). According to Albert de Rochas he made an excellent work, the library being the place to be in Paris for science research as from 1803. In less than 10 years, he had purchased as librarian approximately ten thousand books.

He is also in charge of publishing the Journal of the school. And he starts (likely pushed by Monge) the work for which he will have an international recognition : the gathering and the "proper" translation of ancient Greek mathematical works.

But his exalted, hot-tempered personality, his administrative indiscipline, his unusual way of life (he lives with his mistress), his permanent conflicts with the personnel are a problem for the direction. Guyton de Morveau drives him out from his apartment of the Hotel Lassay in 1803 for "lack of social propriety", claiming that he was "the scandal of the house" . In 1804, Napoleon imposes a military status to the school and the new governor, general Lacuée, determined to eliminate any trouble-maker, dismissed him in October 1804. He wrote a 54 pages memoir to disculp himself, that was analysed by Janis Langins, in a tribute from the École polytechnique's Library Historical Society (SABIX).

=== 1805 and after ===
Probably under the recommendation of Monge, he was appointed professor of Mathématiques spéciales in 1805 at the Lycée Condorcet (Lycée Bonaparte at that time), one of the four lycées recently created in the French capital. Supported by the French Institute ("Institut de France") and many of the mathematicians he met, he continued his work on Greek geometry, which is now considered one of the major achievements in the history of science during the Napoleonic period.

His later career was difficult. He wrote in the foreword of the third part of the Euclid's Elements that the loss of his daughter and granddaughter prevented him from working. The Bourbon Restoration depressed the republican activist he was. He died in 1822 at Hôpital Saint-Louis, a place reserved for destitute people.

== Work ==
=== Mathematical works ===
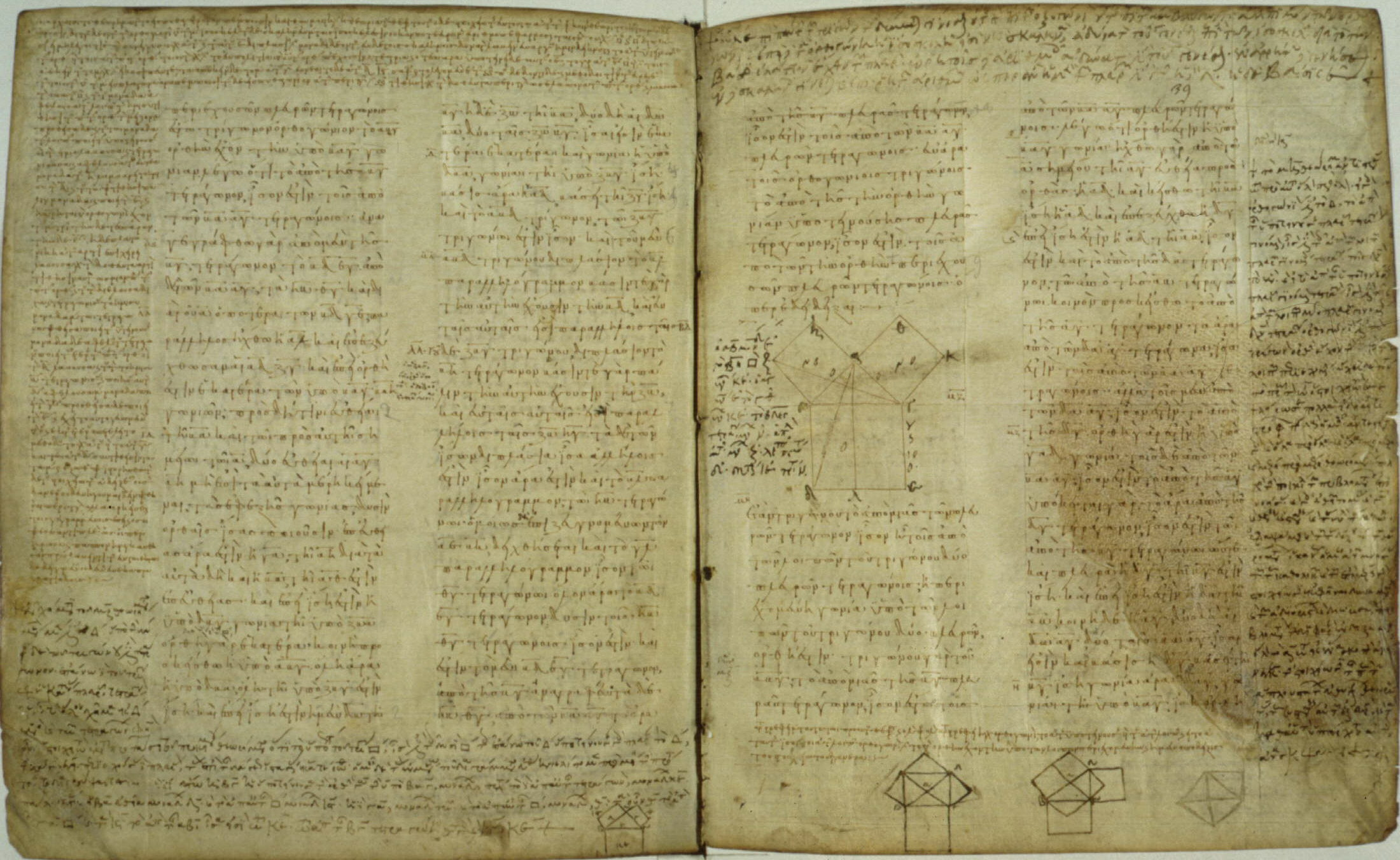
The manuscript Vaticanus Graecus 190, its discovery and translation by Peyrard enable to obtain the definitive version of the Euclid's Elements

As a mathematician, his main contributions are translations of Euclidean geometry due to his great skills in Greek, Latin, and mathematics. His translations of Euclid's Elements are still considered as the best existing in French.

In 1798, he published a revised and augmented version of Bézout's lessons Cours de mathématiques, à l'usage de la marine et de l'artillerie. It was reprinted continuously till 1836.

He provided a version of the Archimedes’s complete opus in 1807.

His masterpiece, however, was his edition of Euclid's Elements which he claimed to have made "during his leisure time at Polytechnique". In 1808, he was the first to identify a previously unknown Euclidean manuscript called Vaticanus graecus 190, a missing part of Euclid's works, that he dug out of Napoléon’s booty from the Vatican. In 1814, he released a revised and definitive edition of the Elements, reviewed by Delambre, Lagrange and Legendre.

He wrote in the foreword of the third volume of his translation of Euclid's Elements that he had also achieved the translation of the Apollonius of Perga works, which were never published.

=== Other works ===
He wrote a philosophical essay (Of Nature and its laws, 1793), translated two books from Heinrich Cornelius Agrippa (Female Preeminence.. and Of the Vanitie and Uncertaintie of Artes and Sciences) and the overall poetry of Horace. He is according to Michaud, a contributor to the Dictionnaire des Athées anciens et modernes ("Dictionary of Ancient and Modern Atheists") of Sylvain Maréchal.

== Selected publications ==
- Peyrard, François. (Euclid's Elements, Euclidean Geometry) (1804)
- Peyrard, François. (applied Arithmetics) (1815).
- Peyrard, François. Euclid's Elements (complete edition), Paris 1814-1818 (in Greek, Latin and French)
  - Part 1, Part 2, Part 3
