= Laurent Broomhead =

French television presenter

- Born: 5 February 1954 (age 72); Paris, France
- Occupations: Television presenter, radio presenter, television producer
- Years active: 1972–present
- Television: Des chiffres et des lettres Objectif demain (Antenne 2); Planète Bleue (Antenne 2); Pyramide (Antenne 2, France 2); La Matinale (Equidia)

Laurent Broomhead (born 5 February 1954) is a French radio and television broadcaster and producer, specializing in science and health. As a horse riding enthusiast, he owns and raises thoroughbreds.

== Biography ==
Laurent Broomhead was born in Paris in the 17th arrondissement. While he was a student in preparatory classes of mathematics at the Lycée Condorcet in Paris, he was noticed on 1 February 1972 as a brilliant candidate on the game show Des chiffres et des lettres broadcast on the second French channel. He then studied electronic engineering at the ENSEEIHT (École Nationale Supérieure d'Électronique, d'Électrotechnique, d'Informatique, d'Hydraulique et des Télécommunications of Toulouse).

== Career ==
=== Printing press ===
When he left school in 1976, he became a science journalist at Sciences et Avenir until 1985. He also wrote a number of books. He currently publishes a monthly chronicle in the magazine Profession vendeur.

=== Television career ===
Patrice Laffont took his young Count down wiz to Un sur cinq, still on Antenne 2. The engineer was in charge of a science section. In 1978, upon Jean-Pierre Elkabbach's request, Laurent Broomhead presented the weather in Patrick Poivre d'Arvor's news, a section he created. For four years, he popularized a more scientific approach to the weather forecast.

From 1979 to 1983, Laurent Broomhead produced and broadcast scientific programs such as Objectif Demain and Planète Bleue. He was then the youngest French TV producer. Again, he paved the way for future scientific programs such as C'est pas sorcier. Laurent Broomhead was the first to show the cloning of calves embryos. He explained the test tube babies in Les bébés de l'an 2000.

From 1991 to 2000, Laurent Broomhead returned to television to co-host the French version of Pyramid with Patrice Laffont and Marie-Ange Nardi. The viewers elected the triplet best TV hosts, twice, at the septs d'or ceremony. Besides, Broomhead also won Questions pour un champion's TV presenters' trophy.

He commented the Solar eclipse of August 11, 1999 live from Fécamp. He also took part in the twelfth Nuit des Étoiles. He regularly appeared in the charity event Téléthon. In September 2000, he joined Martine Allain-Regnault to produce and present the health program Savoir Plus Santé on France 2. The program ended in 2006. From October 2007 to 2016, he presented the morning show on Equidia channel every other morning, hence fulfilling his passion for horse racing.

=== Television programs ===
- 1978–82 : Météo (Antenne 2)
- 1979–81 : Objectif Demain (Antenne 2)
- 1982–83 : Planète Bleue (Antenne 2)
- 1983 : Enquête publique (Antenne 2)
- 1991–2000 : Pyramide (Antenne 2 and France 2)
- 2000–06 : Savoir Plus Santé (France 2)
- 2002 : 12^{e} Nuit des Étoiles (France 2)
- 2007–present : La Matinale (Equidia and Equidia Live)

=== Radio career ===
In 1983, he joined France Inter where he produces and presents a number of scientific programs such as Les Récréatifs Associés. In 1984, still on France Inter, he hosts a daily program with an intellectual game titled Et un raton-laveur. From 2005 to 2007, he presents La science en livre on France Info, a weekly chronicle about scientific books.

=== Communication and multimedia ===
Laurent Broomhead is a communication consultant in industry, energy, environment, scientific and medical research. He prepares and presents several events, including conferences and awards. He was also the communication advisor of Entente radicale écologiste presented by members of the Radical Party of the Left at the Elections in the European Union of 1984.

Laurent Broomhead is the manager of the company LBC, which in addition to multimedia, produces the television program Sophie Club broadcast on Equidia, a weekly magazine hosted by Sophie Thalmann and dedicated to young people interested in horseback riding. The company also produces some documentaries such as La Route du Poisson (2008) and Les chevaux du Puy-du-Fou (2009).

== Passion of horses ==
His grandfather was a lad at Maisons-Laffitte and gave him the passion for horses. He discovered the hippodromes at a very early age. It is also for the Hippodrome de La Cépière that he chose to study at the École d'Ingénieurs of Toulouse. He has been an owner and raiser of thoroughbreds for a number of years and was even elected member of the Committee of France Galop from 1999 to 2007, chaired by Jean-Luc Lagardère and then by Édouard de Rothschild. He produced 700 short programs titled À cheval ! with his company LBC for France 2 from 1996 to 1998.

== Bibliography ==
- Voyage dans les étoiles (Casterman, 1974)
- Je découvre la météorologie (A. Leson, 1978)
- Éviter les pièges de la hi-fi (Hachette, 1979)
- La télévision déchaînée (co-written with Pierre Kohler, published in 1980 at Hachette)
- Objectif Demain (co-written with Pierre Kohler, Presses de la Renaissance, 1980)
- La Nature (Hachette Jeunesse, 1982)
- La Préhistoire (Hachette, 1982)
- Robots, ordinateurs et micro-électronique (France Loisirs, 1983)
- L'Univers (Hachette Jeunesse, 1984)
- À la conquête de l'espace (Fernand Nathan, 1991)

== See also ==
- Des chiffres et des lettres
- Pyramide
