= Charles Rinn =

French hellenist and lexicographer

Charles Wilhem Rinn (6 September 1849, in Marseille – 1929, in Paris) was a French hellenist and lexicographer, mostly known for his textbooks.

== Biography ==
He was agrégé in grammar in 1894. After he completed his studies at the École normale supérieure (1870-1874) he received a two-year assignment as teacher at the lycée de Laval (1874-1875). He later taught at the Collège Rollin in 1875, then at the Lycée Fontanes in 1882, where he ended his career in 1912. He also was a teacher at the maisons d'éducation de la Légion d'Honneur from 1890. In 1893-1894, Roger Martin du Gard was his pupil. In 1895, he was made a chevalier of the Légion d'honneur and an officer in 1913.

== Publications ==
=== Essays and textbooks ===
- Discours prononcé par M. Rinn, à la distribution des prix du collège Rollin le 7 août 1877
- Morale et patrie : lectures à l’usage des écoles primaires (in collaboration with Alfred Mézières 1885, reprinted in 1894 and 1900)
- Nouvelle grammaire française de A. Chassang... revue, modifiée et simplifiée (in collaboration with Louis Humbert 1892, reprinted in 1901, 1903 and 1907)
- 384 dictées choisies... suivies de devoirs oraux et écrits (in collaboration with Louis Humbert), 1895
- Notice sur Deltour (Félix), 1822-1904 (in collaboration with Ernest Dupuy), 1904
- Un mystérieux enlèvement : the Clément de Ris affair, 1910.

=== Commentated editions ===
==== Cicero ====
- [M. Tullii Ciceronis pro Archia poeta oratio, 1881, (reprinted in 1894)
- [M. Tullii Ciceronis Cato major de Senectute liber ad T. Pomponium Atticum, 1882

==== Cornelius Nepos ====
- Cornelii Nepotis opera (in collaboration with L.-Wilhelm Rinn); 1878, reprinted in 1884

==== Herodotus ====
- Les Histoires d’Hérodote : notice, analyse et extraits (in collaboration with Félix Deltour), 1894

==== Homer ====
- L’Iliade et l’Odyssée : notice, analyse et extraits (in collaboration with Félix Deltour), 1894

==== Jean Racine ====
- Les Plaideurs, 1882

==== L.-Wilhelm Rinn ====
- Cours gradué de thèmes latins..., 1878
- Littérature, composition et style : leçons professées dans les cours spéciaux de l’Hôtel de ville de Paris, 1880, (reprinted in 1886 and 1891)

==== Livy ====
- Tite-Live : notice, analyse et extraits (in collaboration with Félix Deltour), 1894

==== Virgil ====
- Virgile : notice, analyse et extraits (in collaboration with Félix Deltour), 1894

==== Xénophon ====
- Extraits de l’Anabase et de la Cyropédie, 1889, (reprinted in 1899)
- Xénophon : notice, analyse et extraits, 1894, (in collaboration with Félix Deltour)

==== Collective collections ====
- Choix de morceaux traduits des auteurs grecs (in collaboration with Félix Deltour, 1884, reprinted in 1885, 1889, 1892, 1895 and 1907)
- Choix de morceaux traduits des auteurs latins (in collaboration with Félix Deltour, 1885, reprinted in 1892 and 1895)
- La Tragédie grecque : analyses et extraits du théâtre d’Eschyle, de Sophocle et d’Euripide (in collaboration with Félix Deltour; reprinted in 1896), 1887
- Analyses et extraits des auteurs grecs et des auteurs latins, 1893, (in collaboration with Félix Deltour)
