= Horace Finaly =

French banker

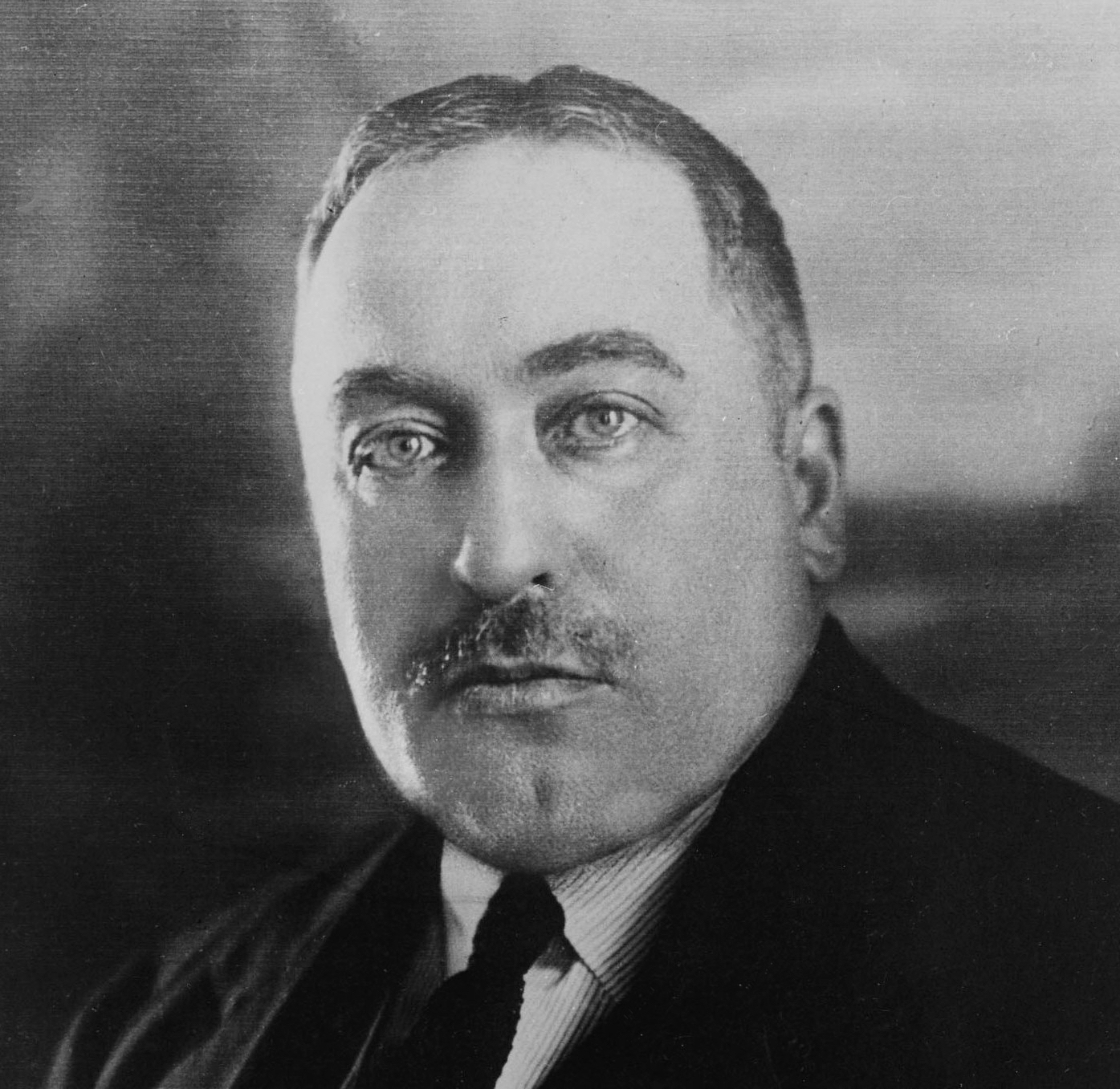
- Born: Horace Finaly; 30 May 1871; Óbuda, Austria-Hungary
- Died: 19 May 1945 (aged 73); New York City, U.S
- Resting place: Père Lachaise Cemetery, Paris, Francia.
- Education: Lycée Condorcet
- Occupation(s): Financier, banker, art collector
- Spouse: Marguerite Finaly (m. 1899; died 1901)
- Parent(s): Hugo Finaly; Eugenia (Jenny) Ellenberger

Horace Finaly (30 May 1871, Budapest – 19 May 1945, New York City) French banker, was director general of the Banque de Paris et des Pays-Bas (Paribas) between 1919 and 1937. It imposed its policy and philosophy of its business by the enormous power which had directed the bank.

== Biography ==
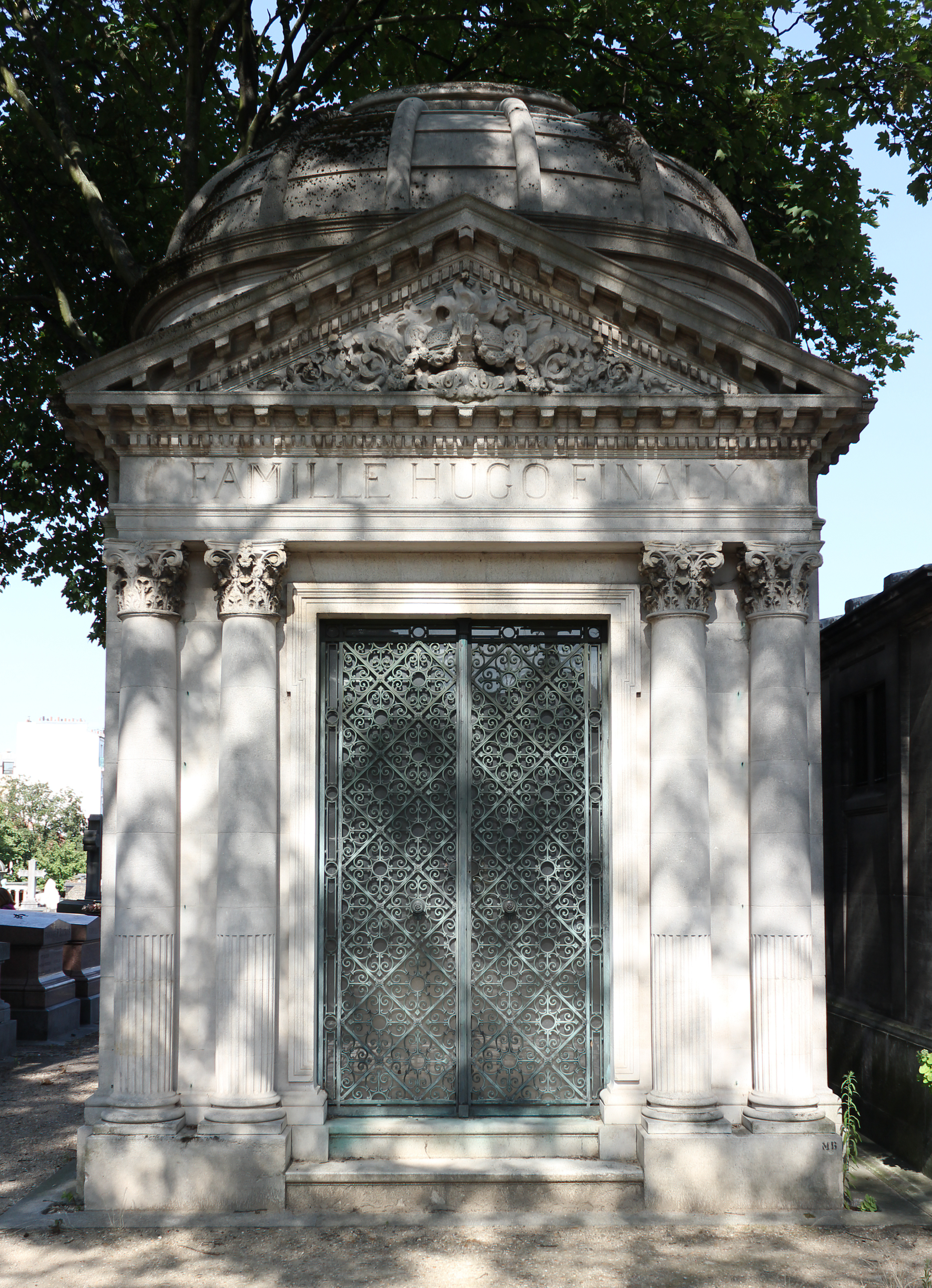
Family Chapel Hugo Finaly.

He was born on 30 May 1871 in Óbuda (now a part of Budapest) and studied at the Lycée Condorcet and passed a law degree in Paris University. He died in New York on 19 May 1945, but his remains are to Père Lachaise Cemetery in Paris, not far from where he was one of the gentlemen of the time.

== See also ==
- J. P. Morgan (1837–1913)
- Henri Deterding (1866–1939)
