= Lycée Condorcet =

School in Paris, France

Coordinates: 48°52′29.20″N 2°19′38.36″E

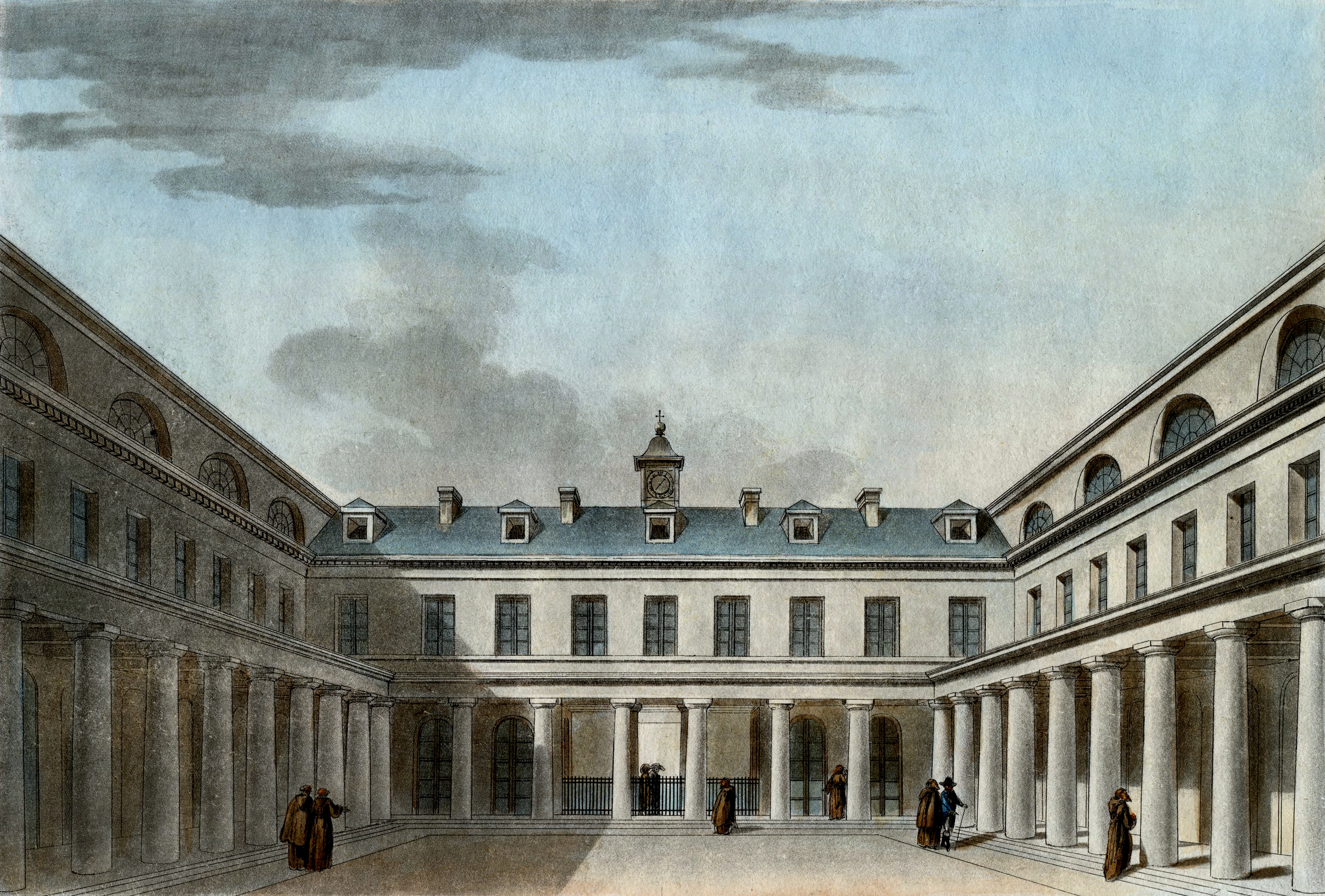
- 1808 engraving of the Lycée's entrance

Location
- 8 rue du Havre; Paris, Île-de-France, 75009; France

Information
- School type: Public school, Secondary education, Higher School Preparatory Classes
- Established: 10 September 1803; 222 years ago
- School district: 9th arrondissement of Paris
- Authority: Académie de Paris
- Headmaster: Patrick ROUIL
- Staff: 86 (in 2007)
- Enrollment: ~1000 students
- Language: French
- Color: Condorcet Red
- Graduates: 100% (2019)
- Foreign languages: English, German, Spanish, Italian, Latin, Ancient Greek
- Website: https://lycee-condorcet.ac-paris.fr

The Lycée Condorcet (French: [lise kɔ̃dɔʁsɛ]) is a secondary school in Paris, France, located at 8, rue du Havre, in the city's 9th arrondissement. Founded in 1803, it is one of the four oldest high schools in Paris and also one of the most prestigious. Since its inception, various political eras have seen it given a number of different names, but its identity today honors the memory of the Marquis de Condorcet. Henri Bergson, Horace Finaly, Claude Lévi-Strauss, Marcel Proust, Jean-Luc Marion, Francis Poulenc and Paul Verlaine are some of the students who attended the Lycée Condorcet.

Some of the school's famous teachers include Jean Beaufret, Paul Bénichou, Jean-Marie Guyau, Jean-Paul Sartre, and Stéphane Mallarmé.

== History ==
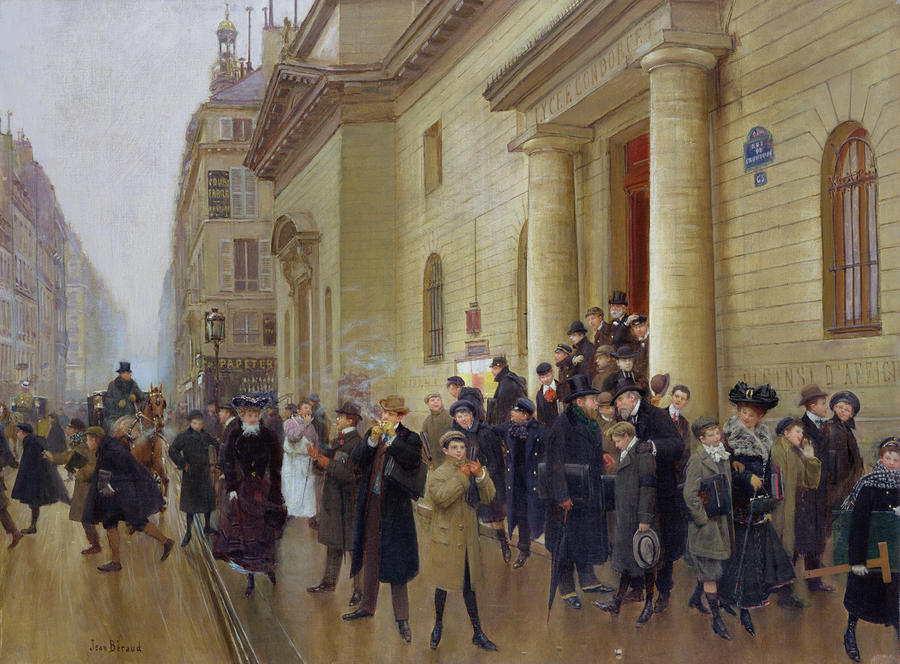
1903 painting of the lycée entrance

During the greater part of the nineteenth century, the school was the "great Liberal High School" on the right bank with its relatively flexible regime that was chosen by the progressive bourgeoisie for its sons. It is among the few schools in Paris that never had students as boarders: students who were not living with their parents worked, ate and slept in the neighbourhood via a network of "maitres de pension". The mix has gradually emerged in 1924 for preparatory classes for the grandes écoles, and 1975 for secondary classes.

Over the course of its history the school has changed name several times:

- Lycée de la Chaussée d’Antin (1804)
- Lycée impérial Bonaparte (1805 – 1814)
- Collège royal de Bourbon (July 1815 – February 1848)
- Lycée impérial Bonaparte (1848 – 1870)
- Lycée Condorcet (22 October 1870 – 1874)
- Lycée Fontane (1 May 1874 – 27 January 1883)
- Lycée Condorcet (since 1883)

Preparatory classes are also very old and were treated to famous teachers such as Jean-Paul Sartre.

== Academics ==
=== Reputation and rankings ===
School Rankings
Name	Academy of Paris	National
Le Figaro Étudiant (2020)	6	9
L'Internaute (2022)	3	3
L'Express (2022)	8	12

== Notable teachers ==
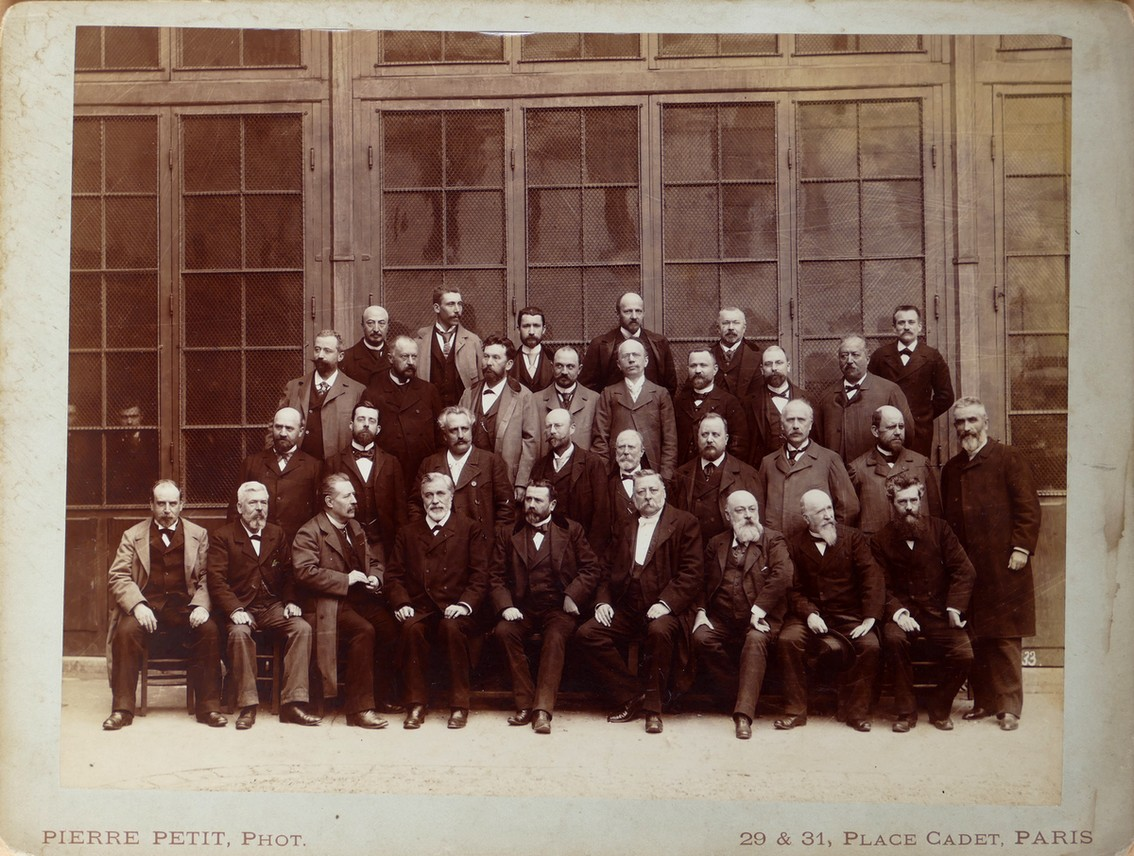
Condorcet's faculty in 1882.

- Alain (philosophie, 1903–1904)
- Jean-Michel Atlan (philosophie)
- Jules Barni (philosophie)
- Jean Beaufret (philosophie, 1955–1972)
- Paul Bénichou (lettres)
- Louis Benaerts
- Léon Brunschvicg (philosophie)
- Monsieur Champagne (surveillant général, animateur de radio)
- Albert Châtelet (mathématiques, 1908)
- Pierre Clarac (lettres, 1927–1932)
- George Cœdès (Allemand)
- Félicien Challaye (Philosophie)
- Georges Colomb (Sciences naturelles)
- Émile Coornaert (Histoire)
- Maurice Crouzet (Histoire, 1937–1943)
- Édouard Daladier (Histoire, 1919)
- Alphonse Darlu (Philosophie, professeur de Marcel Proust)
- Paul Desjardins (Lettres, 1906–1919)
- Louis Gallouédec (Histoire-géographie, 1904)
- Maxime Gaucher (Lettres, professeur de Marcel Proust)
- Jean-Marie Guyau
- Georges Huisman (1925–1931)
- Roger Ikor (Lettres)
- Jean Izoulet (Philosophie)
- Jean Jaurès
- Jules Lemoine (Sciences physiques)
- Stéphane Mallarmé (Anglais)
- Maurice Merleau-Ponty (Philosophie, 1944–1945)
- Marcel Pagnol (Anglais, 1923–1926)
- François Peyrard (Mathématiques)
- Louis Poinsot (Mathématiques)
- Charles Rinn
- Olivier Revault d'Allonnes (Philosophie)
- Jean-Paul Sartre (Philosophie, 1941–1944)
- Amédée Thalamas (Histoire-géographie)

== Notable alumni ==
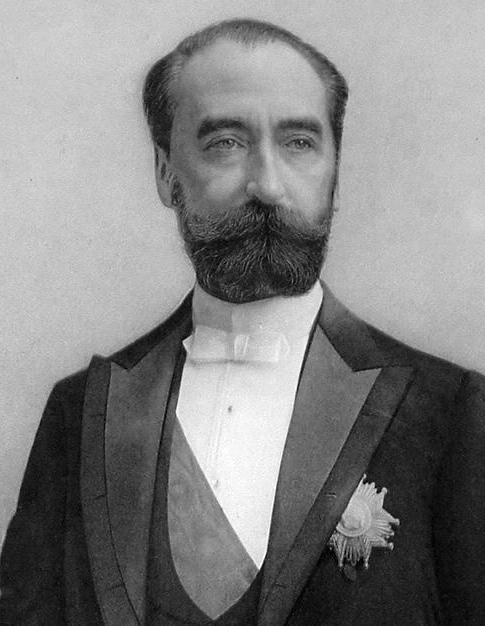
5th President of France Sadi Carnot

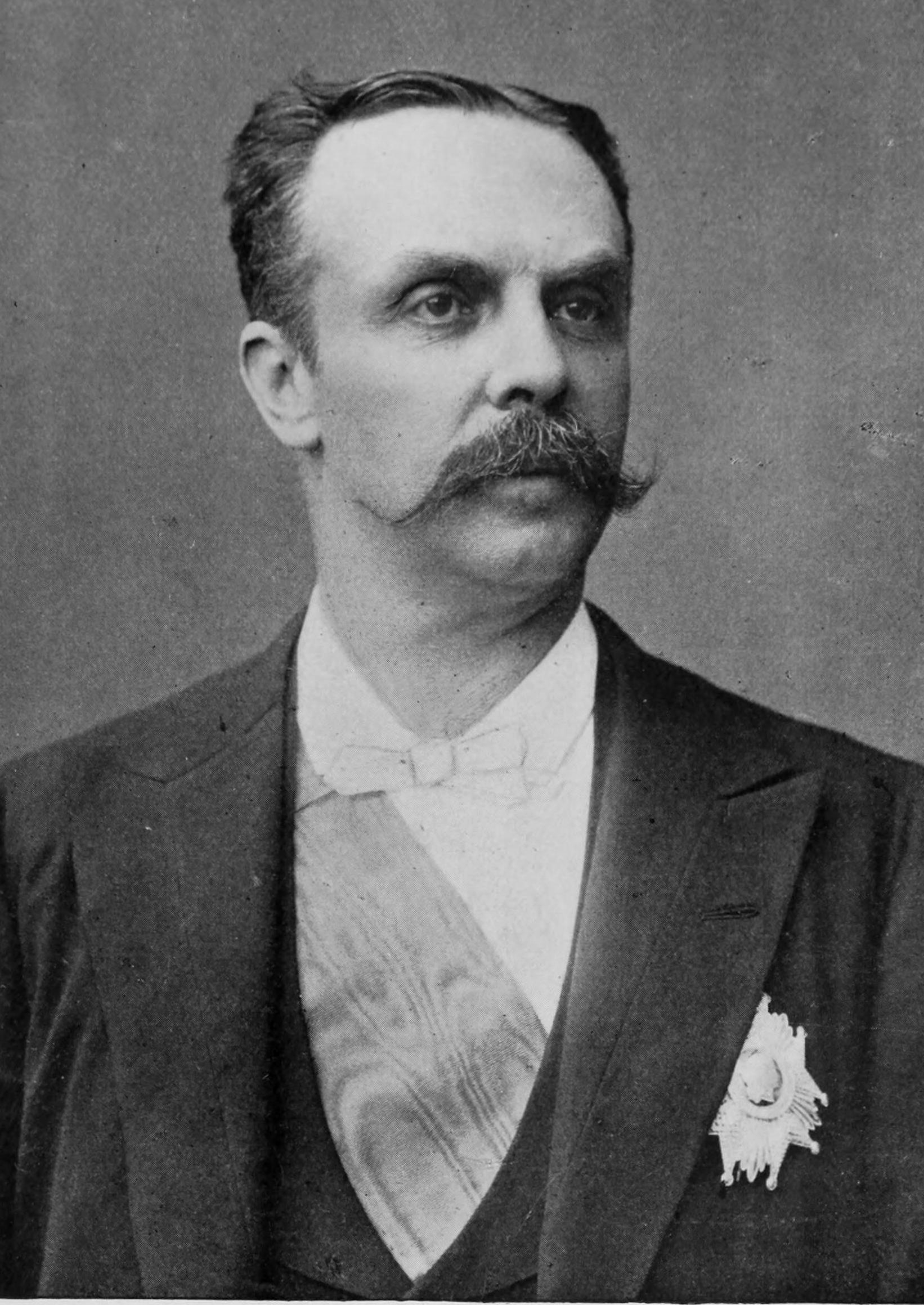
6th President of France Jean Casimir-Perier

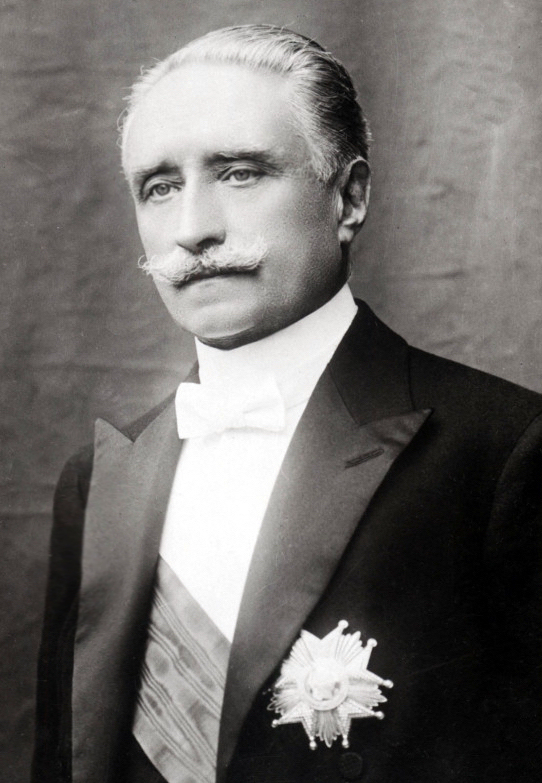
11th President of France Paul Deschanel

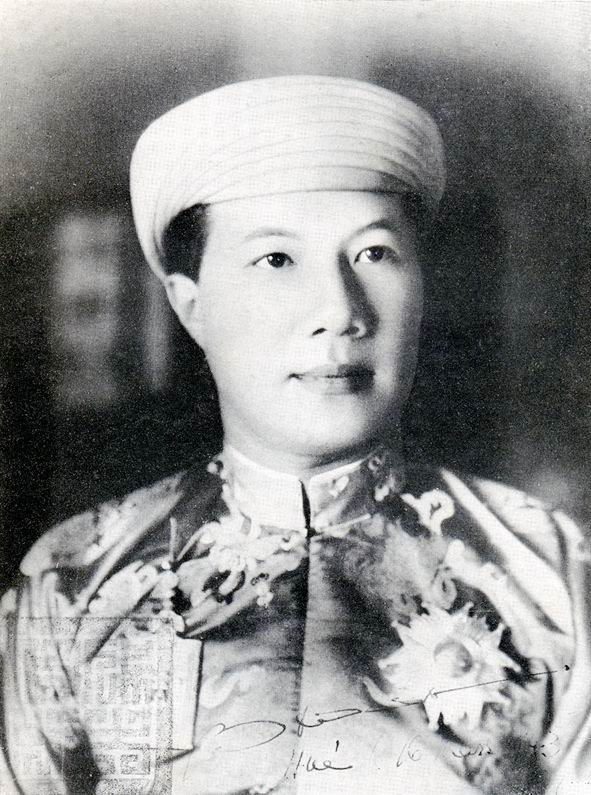
13th Emperor of Vietnam Bảo Đại

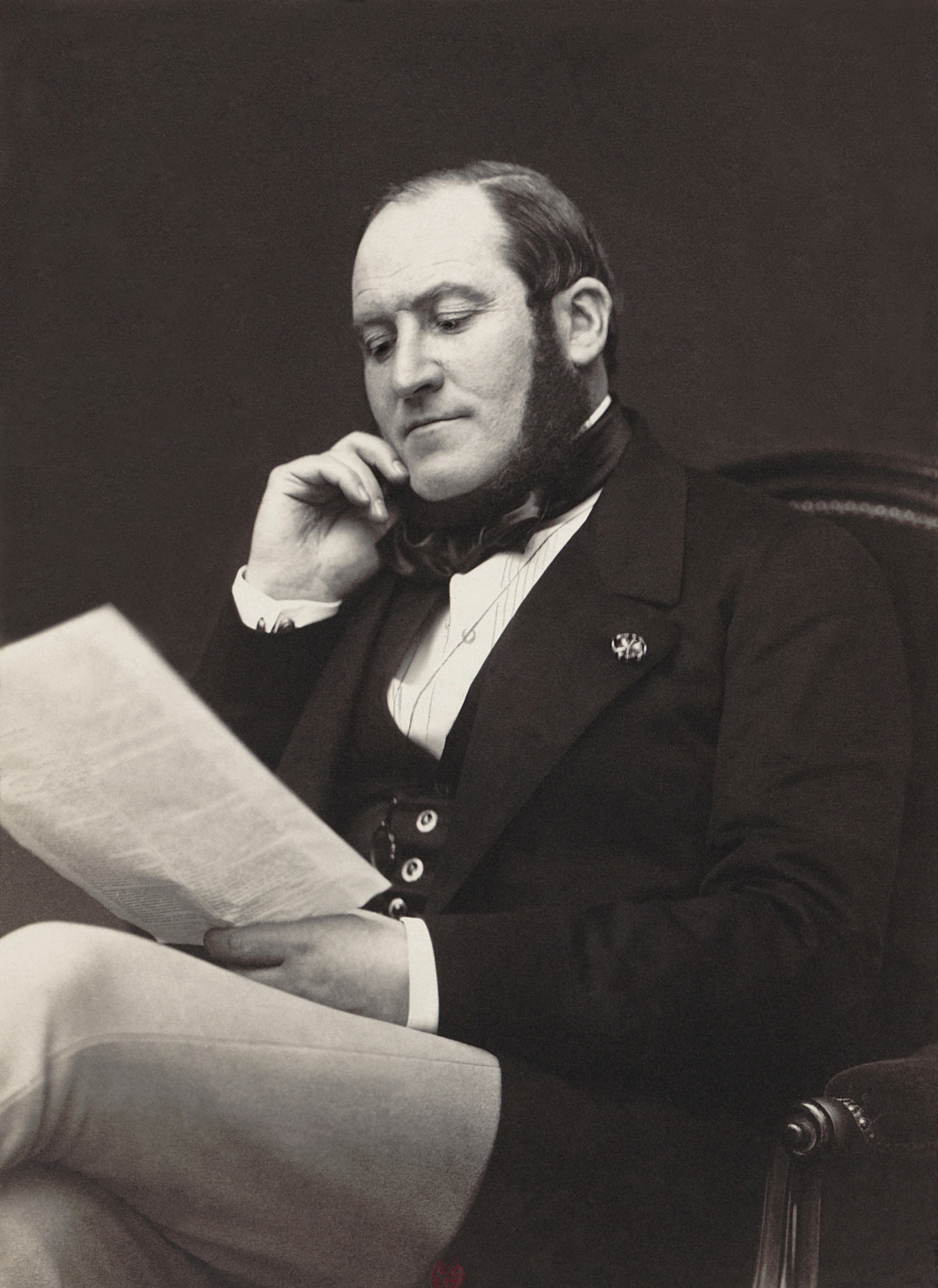
12th Prefect of Seine and architect Georges-Eugène Haussmann

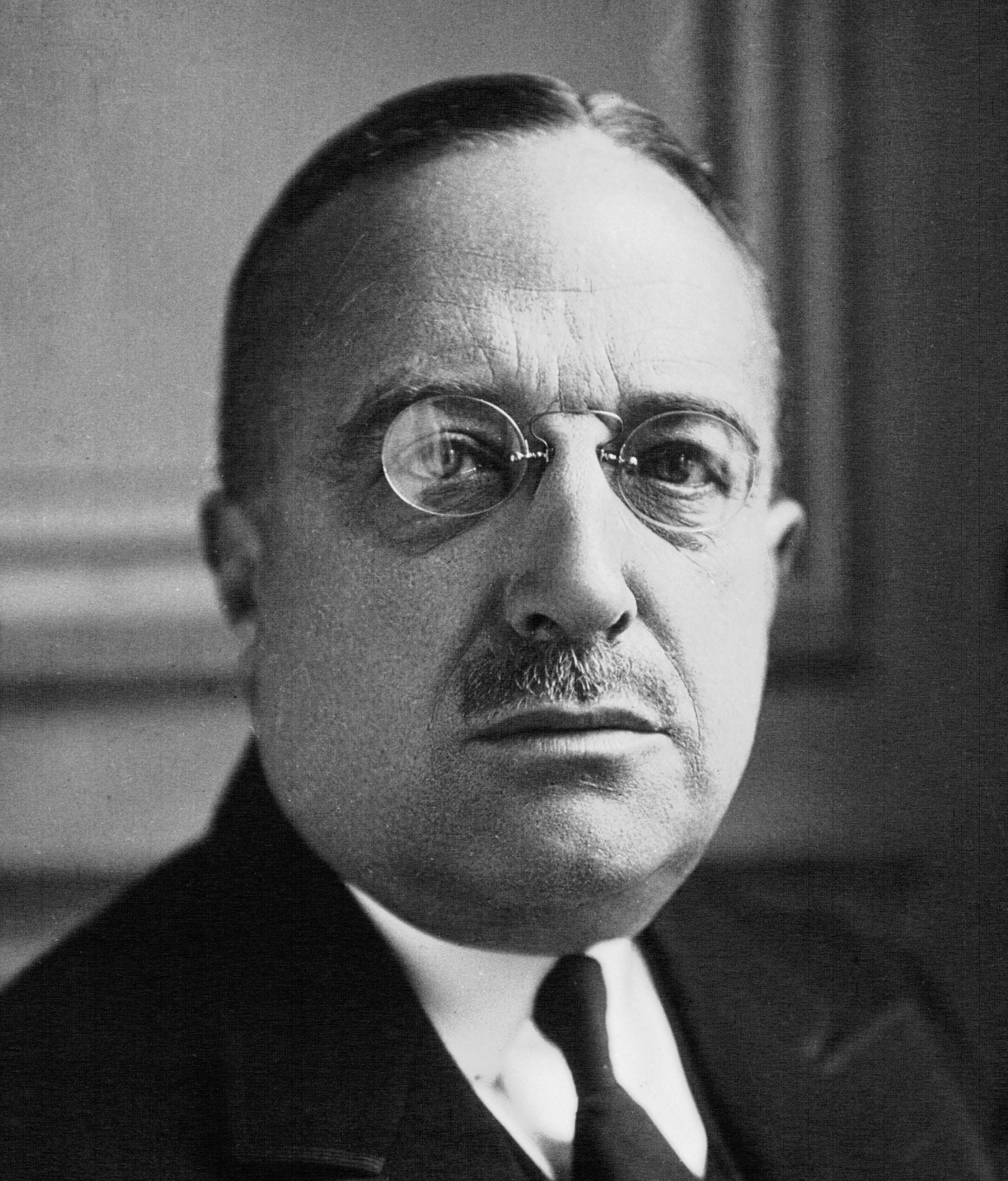
67th Prime Minister of France André Tardieu

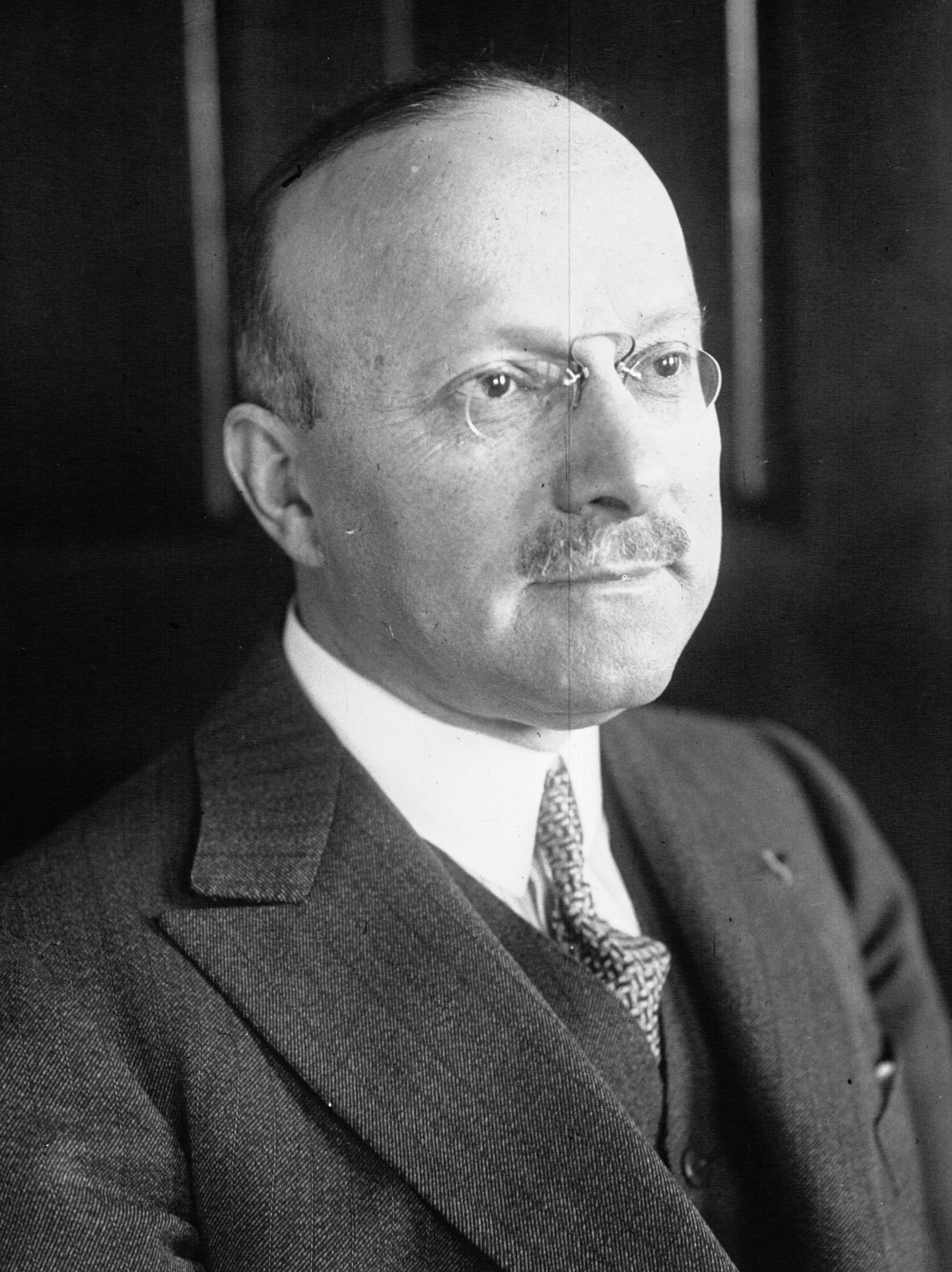
Founder of Citroën, André Citroën

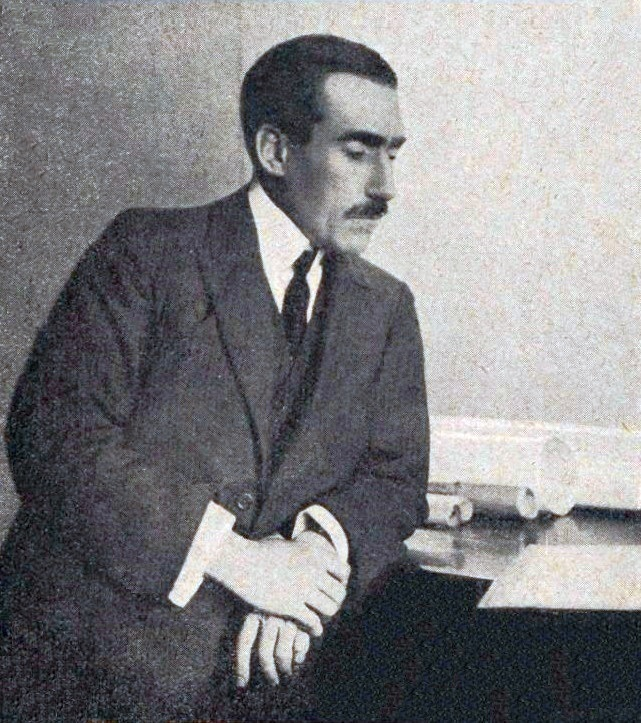
Founder of Renault, Louis Renault

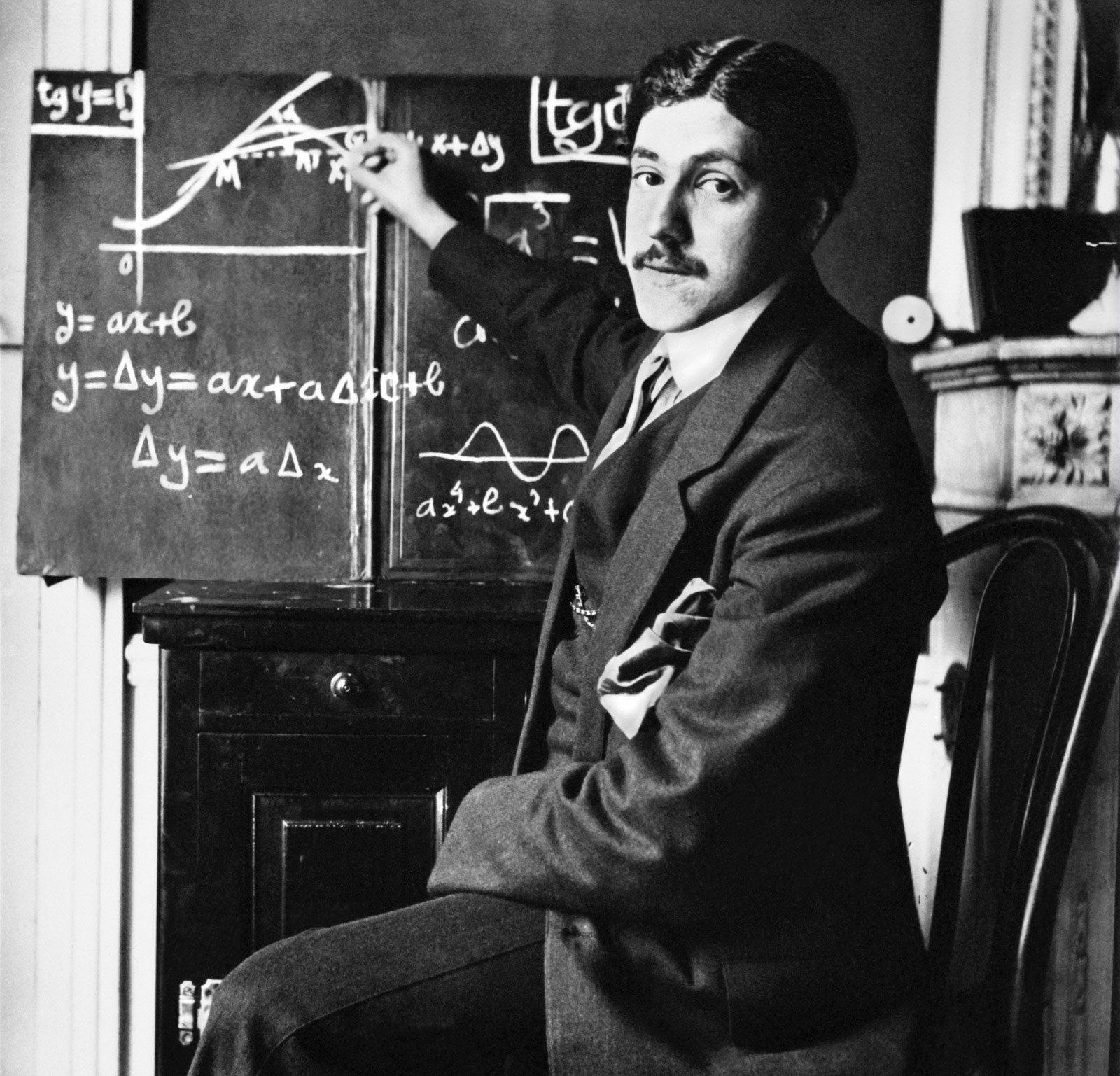
Founder of Dassault Aviation, Marcel Dassault

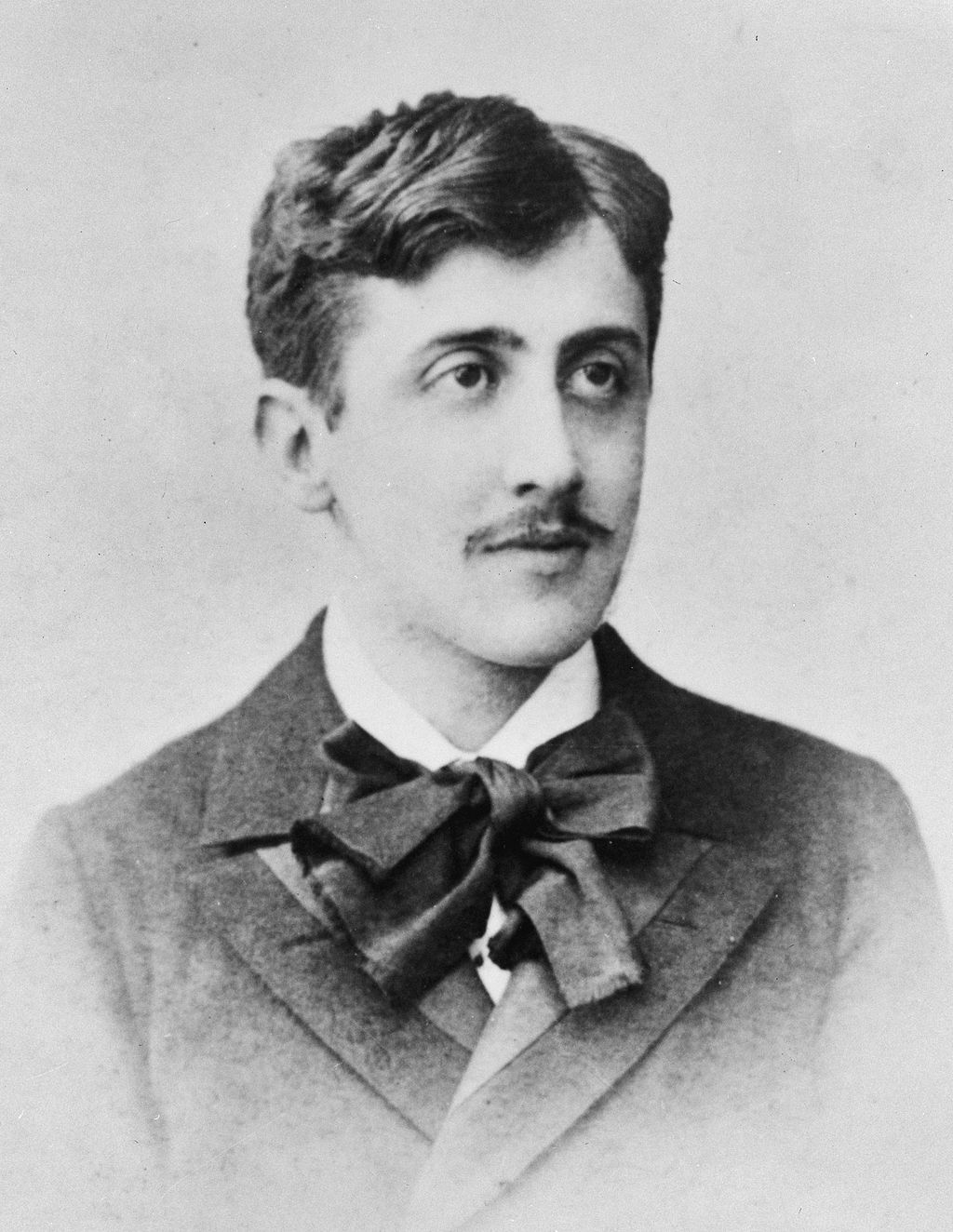
Novelist and Critic Marcel Proust

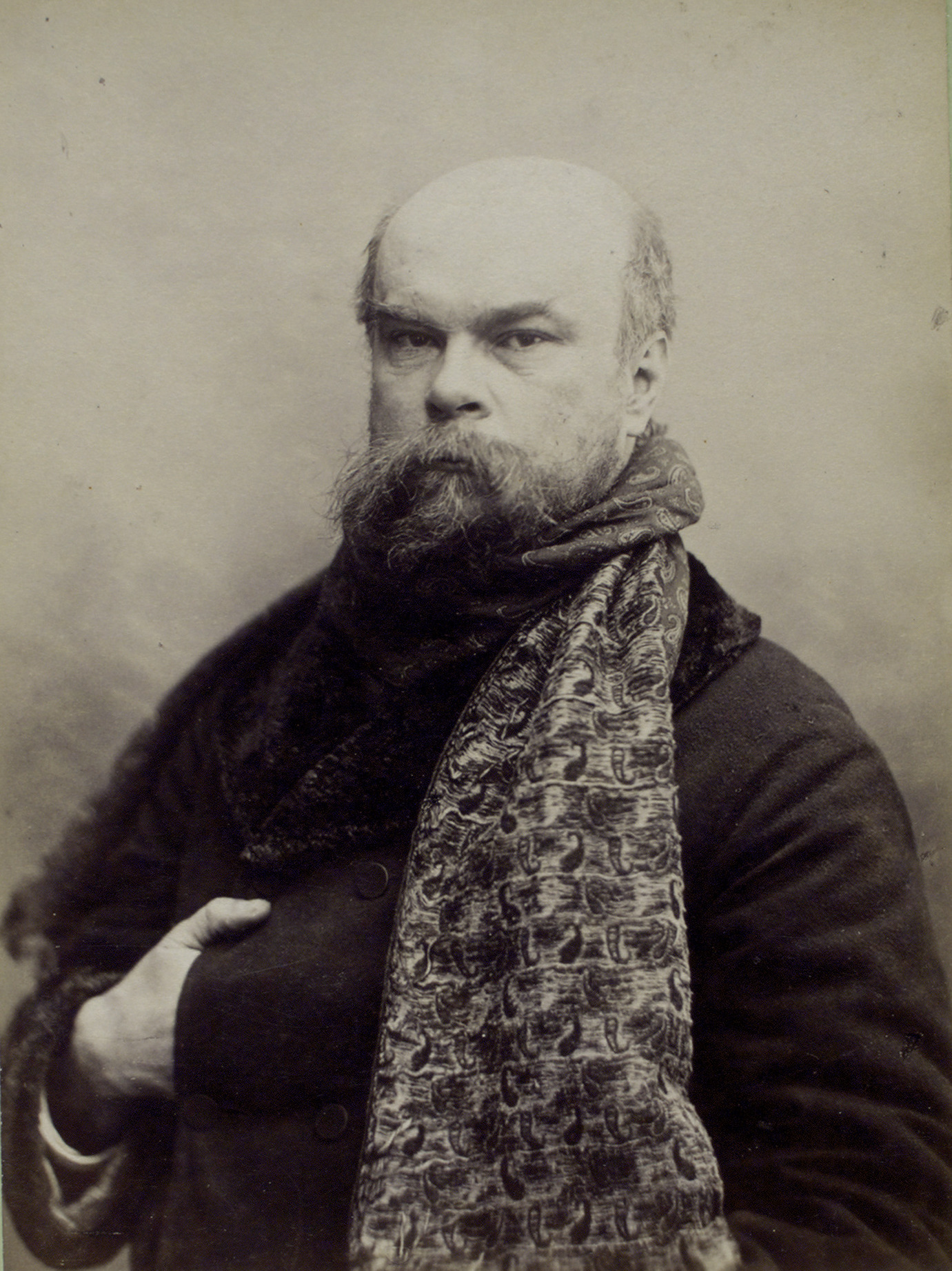
Poet Paul Verlaine

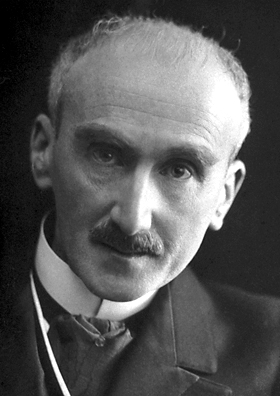
Henri Bergson

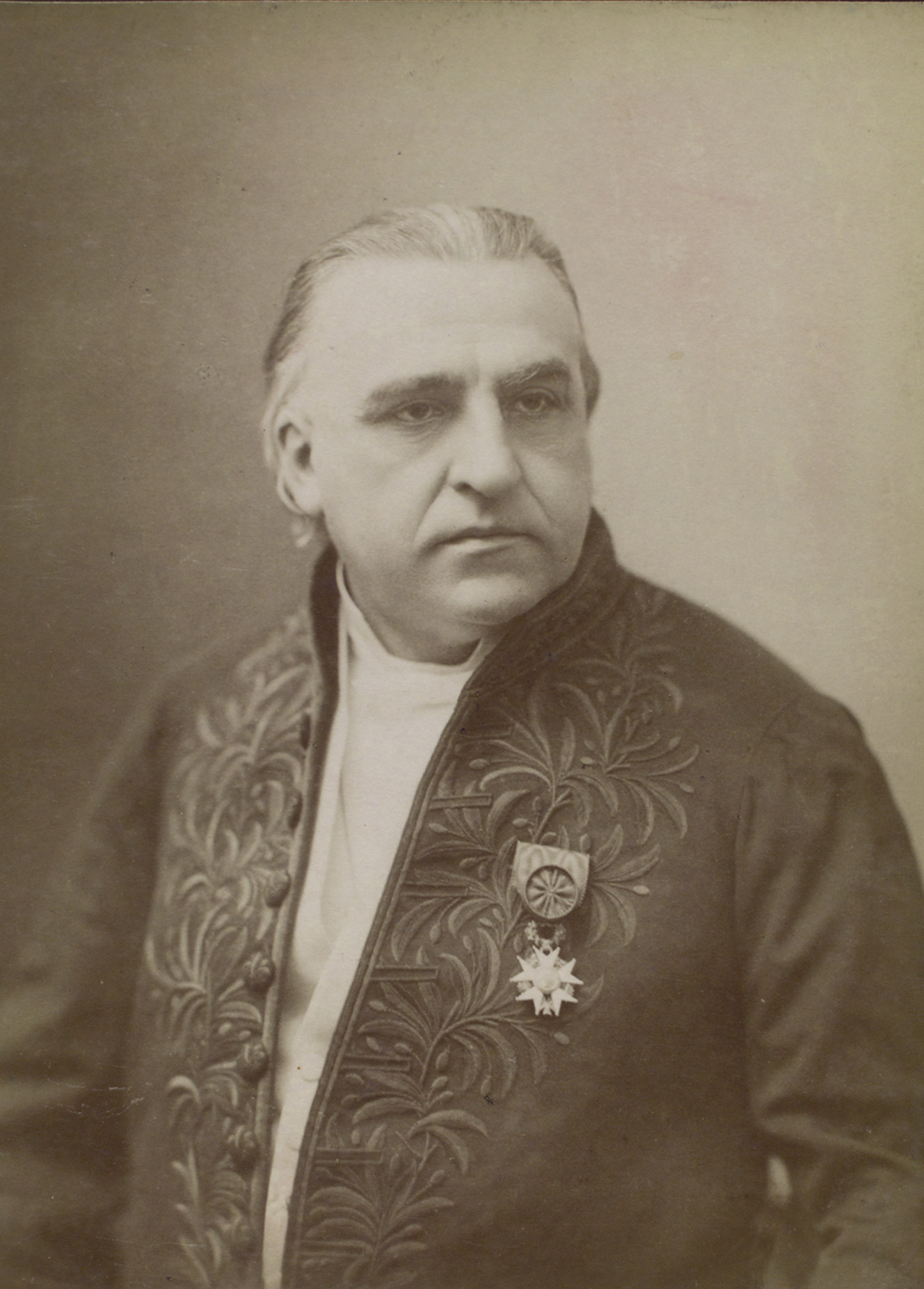
Neurologist Jean-Martin Charcot

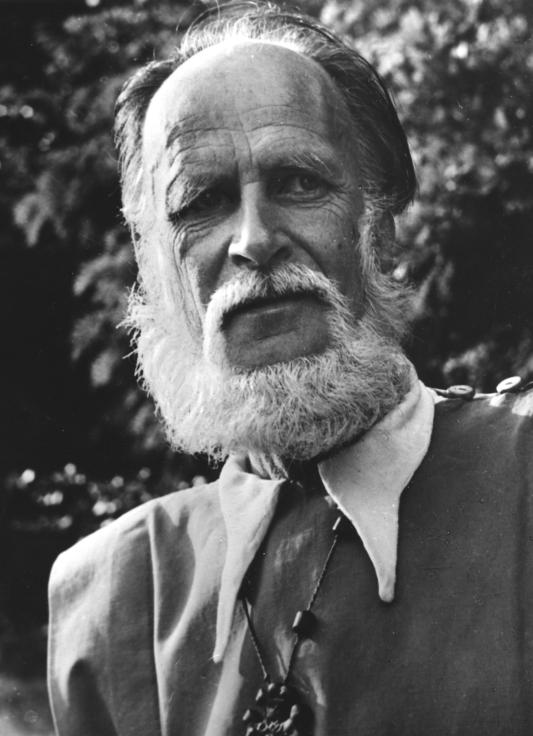
Lanza del Vasto

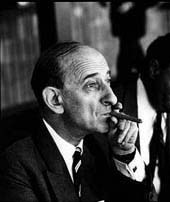
Raymond Aron

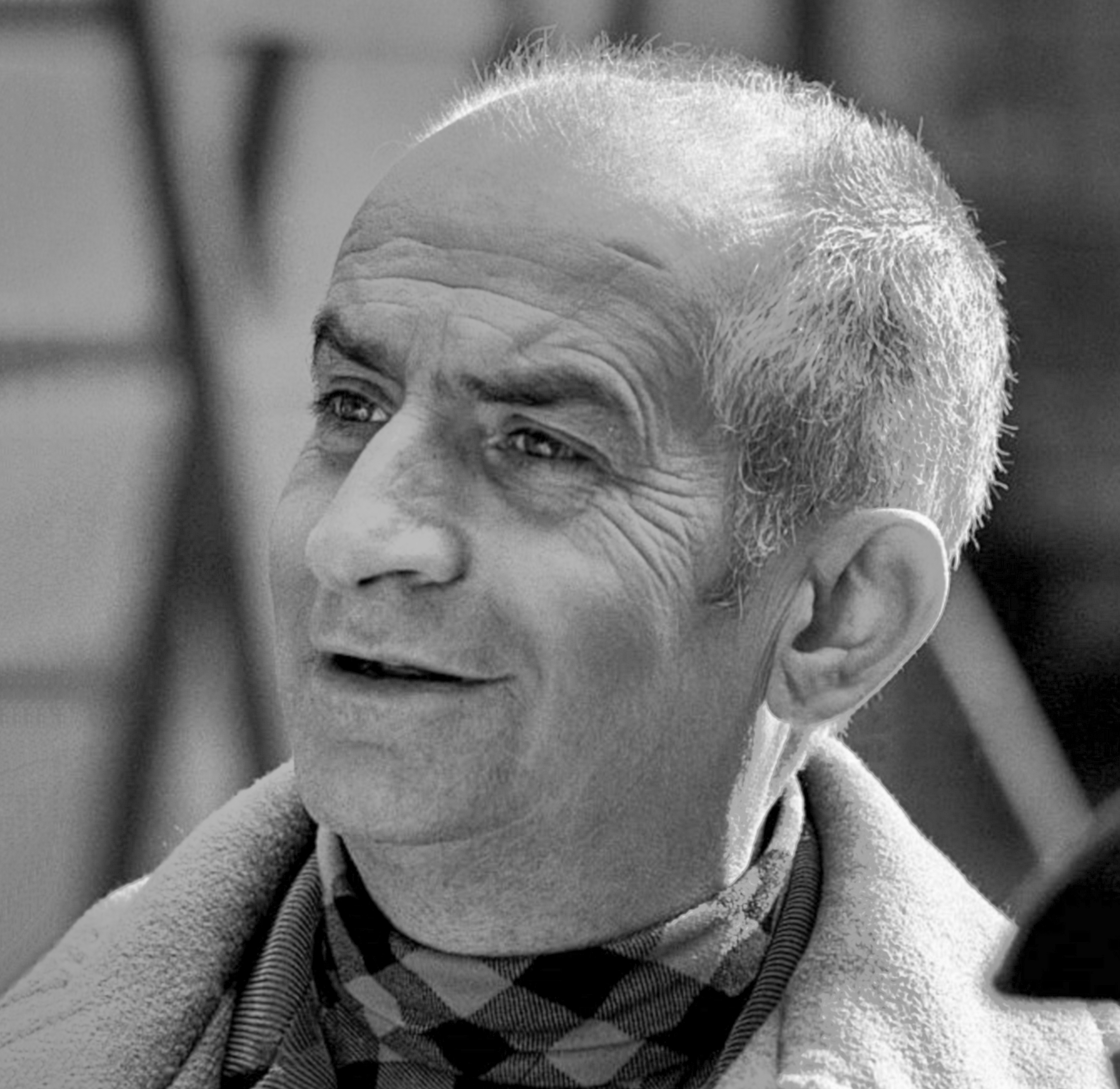
Actor Louis de Funès

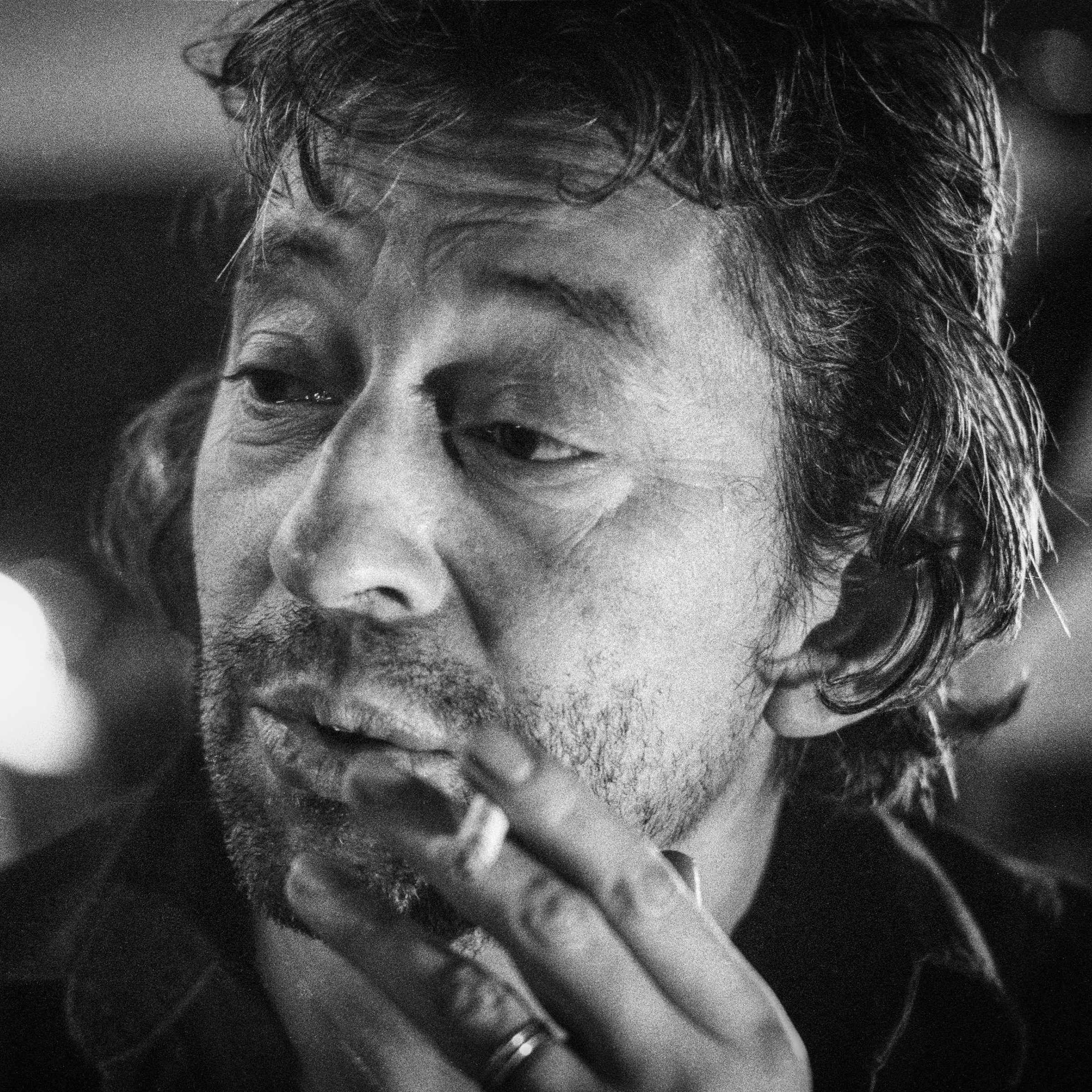
Actor Serge Gainsbourg

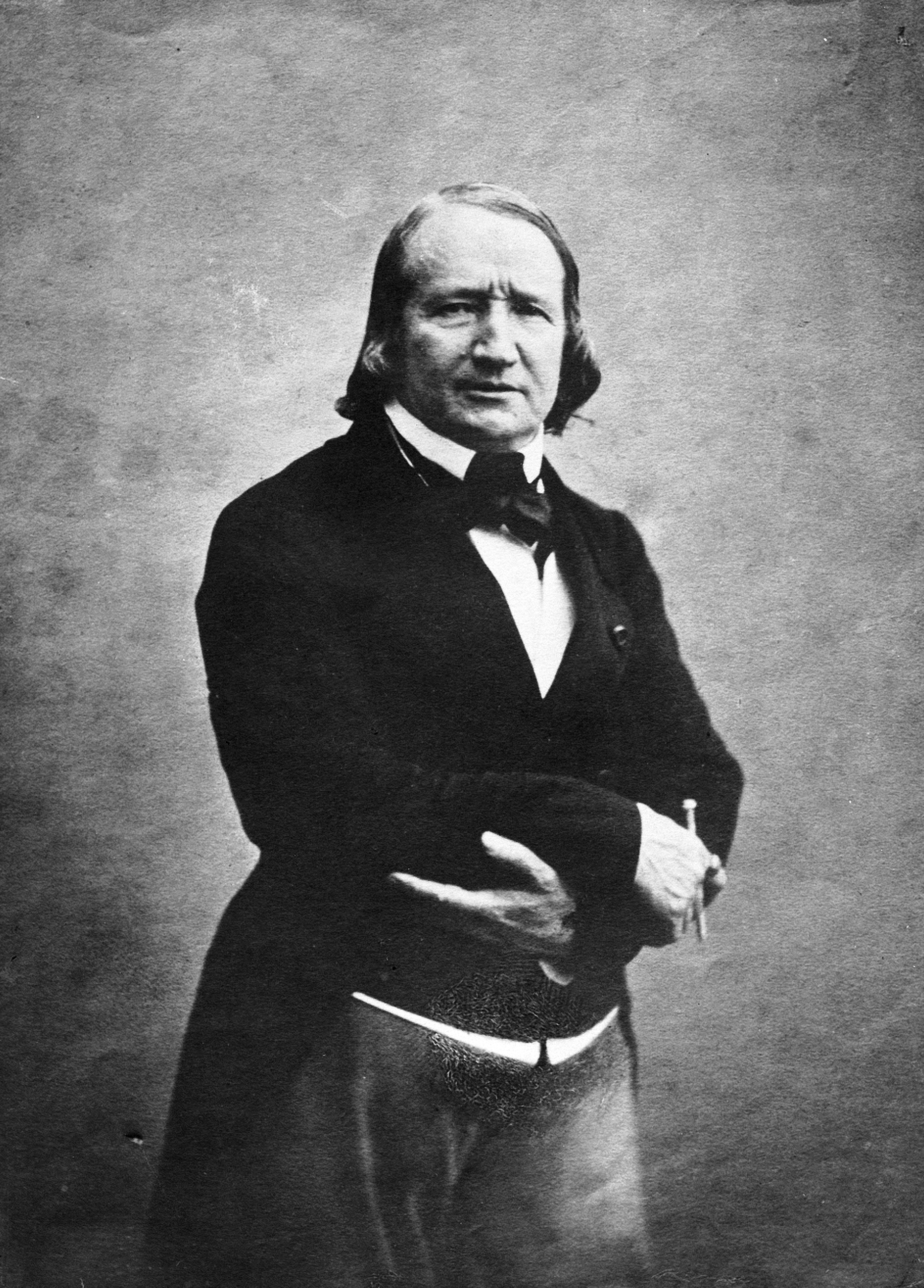
Leader of French Romanticism Alfred de Vigny

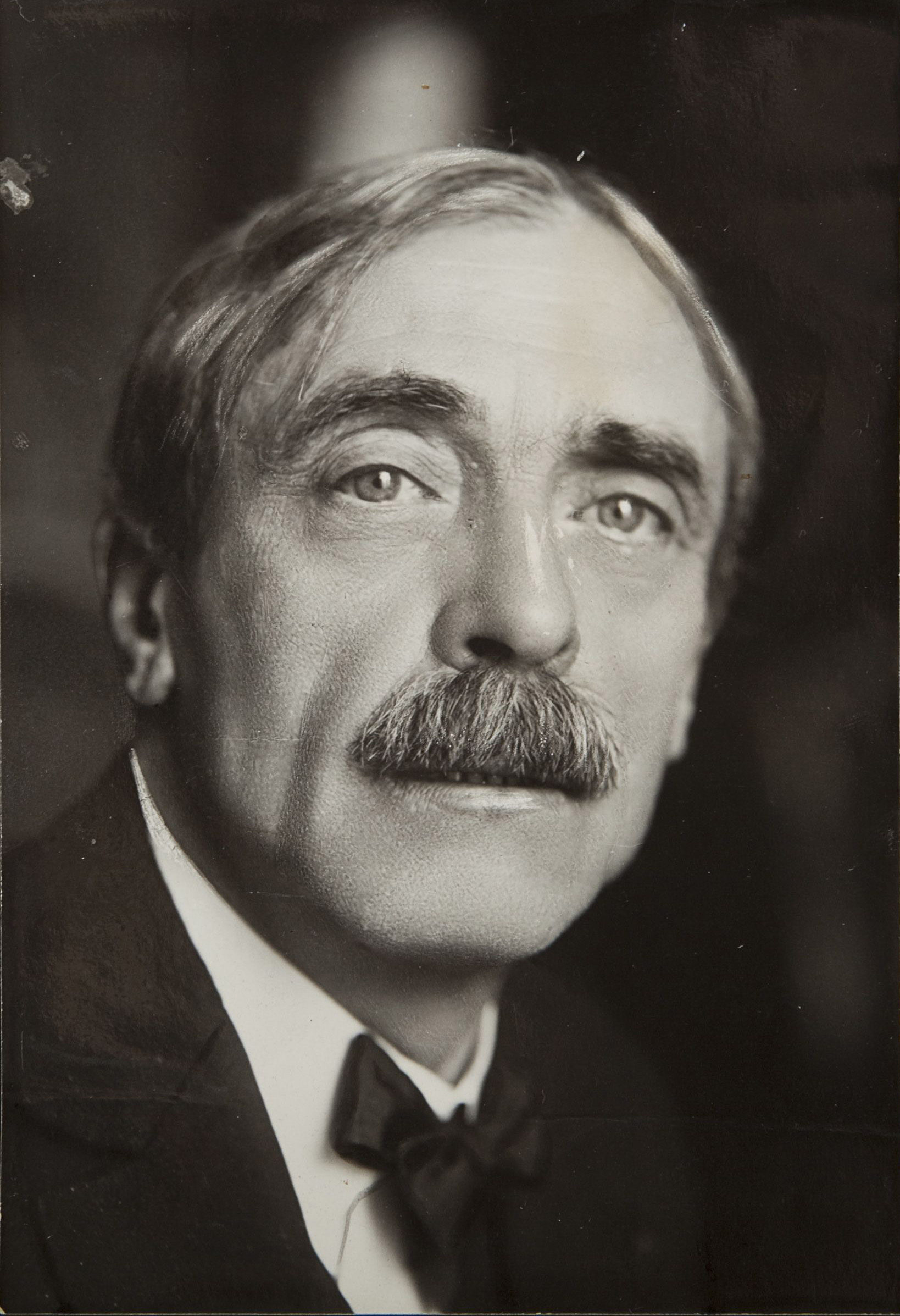
Paul Valéry

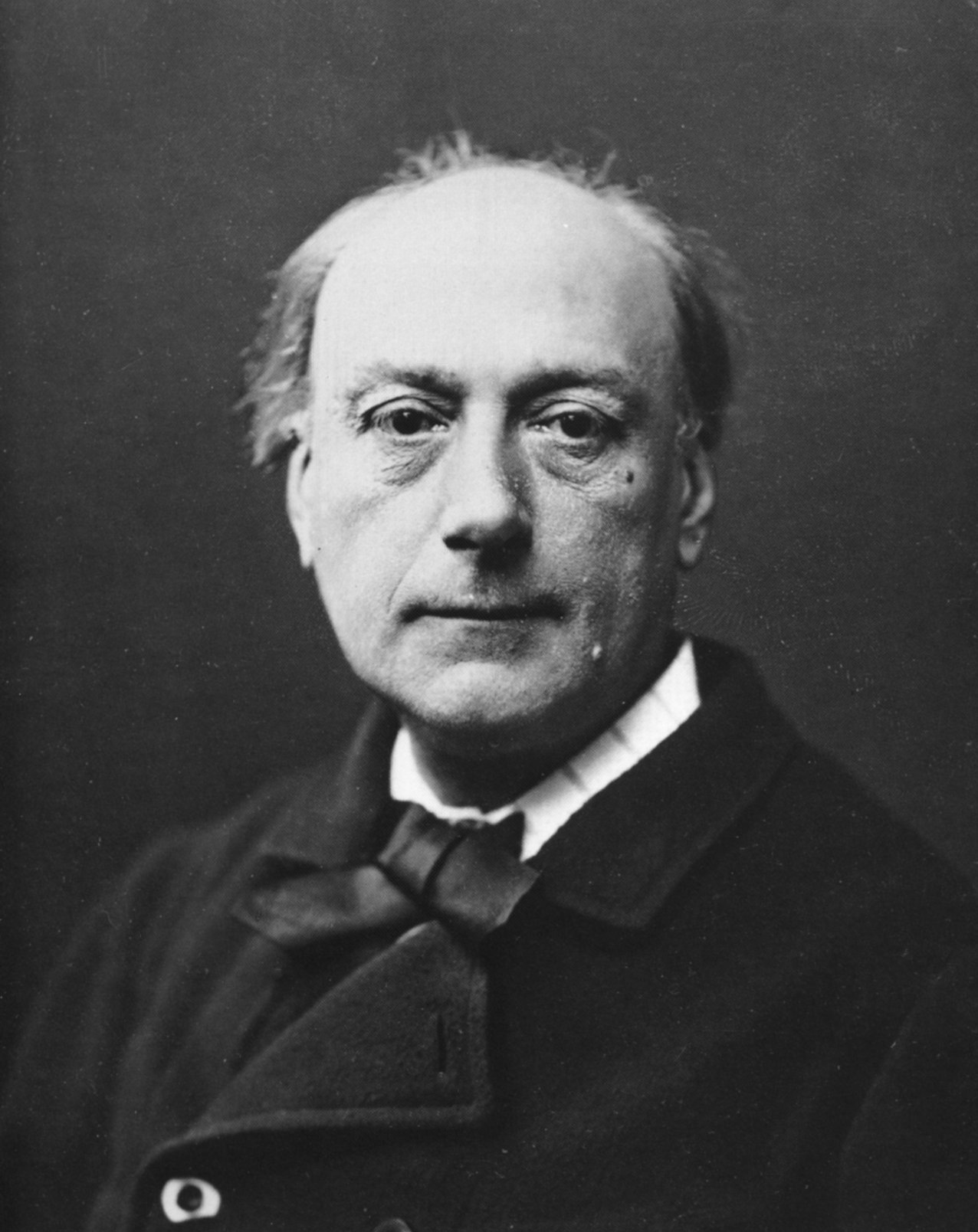
Théodore de Banville

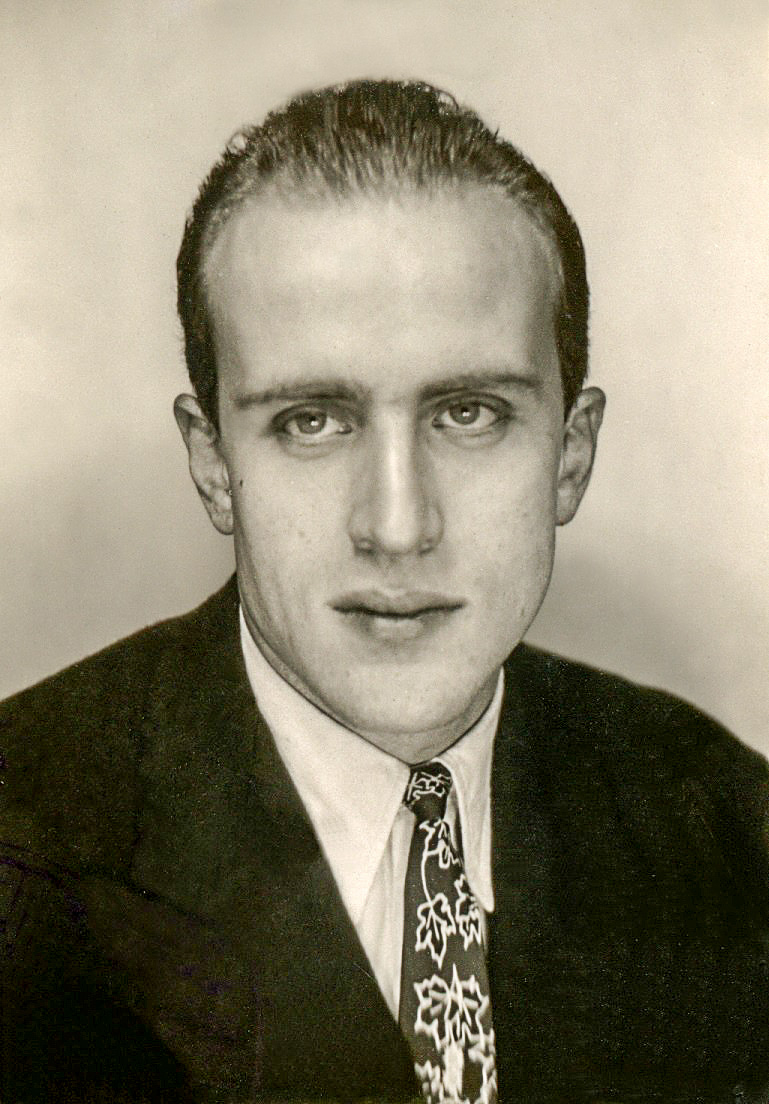
Boris Vian

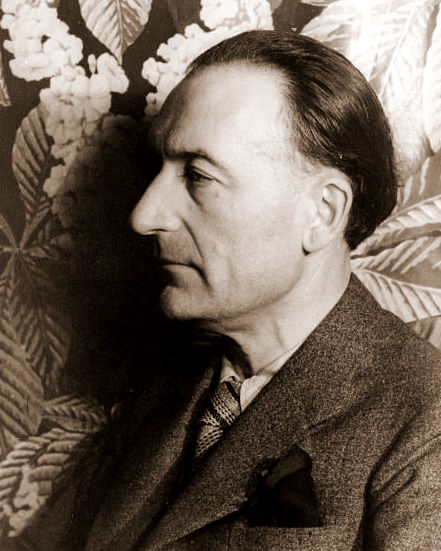
Poet and Writer Jules Romains, Founder of Unanimism
- Abdoulaye Wade
- Alain Frontier
- Alain Gillot-Petré
- Alain Krivine
- Albert Lautman
- Albert-Marie de Monléon
- Alexandre Dumas fils
- Alexandre Stavisky
- Alexandre-Théodore Brongniart
- Alfred Grosser
- André Antoine
- André Siegfried
- Anne Chopinet
- Antoine Charma
- Aurélien Lugné, dit Lugné-Poe
- Barbara Cassin
- Bernard Blier
- Carlos Raúl Villanueva
- Charles Augustin Sainte-Beuve
- Charles de Montalembert
- Christophe Bourseiller
- Claude Lévi-Strauss
- Clémence Ramnoux
- Daniel Buren
- Daniel Halévy
- David Kessler
- Dominique Lapierre
- Edmond de Goncourt
- Édouard Brézin
- Édouard de Rothschild
- Edouard Drumont
- Édouard Vuillard
- Édouard-Alfred Martel
- Émile Javal
- Émile Taufflieb
- Emmanuel d'Astier de la Vigerie
- Eric Walter, dit Hector Obalk
- Etienne Guyon
- Eugène Labiche
- Eugène Lefèvre-Pontalis
- Eugène Sue
- Fabien Lévy
- Félix d'Hérelle
- Félix Nadar
- Ferdinand Buisson
- Ferdinand Walsin Esterhazy
- Francis Poulenc
- Geneviève Rodis-Lewis
- Georges Perros
- Georges Vésier
- Gérard Gachet
- Gilbert Cesbron
- Gilbert Grandval
- Gustave Bloch
- Guy de Rothschild
- Henri Cartier-Bresson
- Henri de Toulouse-Lautrec
- Henri Hauser
- Henri Langlois
- Henri Pescarolo
- Henri Rabaud
- Henri Schneider
- Hippolyte Taine
- Horace Finaly
- Jacques Copeau
- Jacques-Émile Blanche
- Jacques de Reinach
- Jacques Dutronc
- Jacques Laurent
- Jean Balladur
- Jean Béraud
- Jean Cocteau
- Jean de Baroncelli
- Jean Dieudonné
- Jean Hugo
- Jean Marais
- Jean Nohain
- Jean-Barthélemy Hauréau
- Jean-Claude Delafon
- Jean-Claude Trichet
- Jean-Dominique Bauby
- Jean-Louis Crémieux-Brilhac
- Jean-Luc Marion
- Jean-Pierre Ceytaire
- Joseph Caillaux
- Joseph Reinach
- Jules de Goncourt
- Jules Laforgue
- Jules Vallès
- Ker-Xavier Roussel
- Laurent Broomhead
- Léon Brunschvicg
- Léon Noël
- Louis-François-Clement Breguet
- Les trois frères Reinach :
  Joseph, Salomon et Théodore
- Madeleine Michelis
- Marcel Brillouin
- Marcel Cohen
- Maurice Denis
- Maxime Le Forestier
- Michel Dubost
- Michel Field
- Michel Habib-Deloncle
- Michel Maurice-Bokanowski
- Monique Canto-Sperber
- Nathalie Rihouet
- Olivier Guichard
- Patrice Duhamel
- Patrick Devedjian
- Paul Leroy-Beaulieu
- Paul Sérusier
- Philippe Bouvard
- Philippe Chabasse
- Pierre Bénichou
- Pierre Bonnard
- Pierre Corvol
- Pierre Émile Levasseur
- Pierre Lazareff
- Pierre Lellouche
- Pierre Louis-Dreyfus
- Pierre Manent
- Pierre Michel
- Pierre Moscovici
- Pierre-Jean Rémy
- Pierre-Oscar Lévy
- Régis Messac
- René de Obaldia
- René Ghil
- René Rémond
- Robert Aron
- Robert de Flers
- Robert Proust
- Roger Ikor
- Roger Martin du Gard
- Roger Perelman
- Roland Castro
- Roland Moreno
- Romain Coolus
- Romain Goupil
- Romain Thomas, dit Lhéritier
- Serge Doubrovsky
- Thomas Fersen
- Tristan Bernard
- Victor Schœlcher
- William Carlos Williams
