= Félix Deltour =

Nicolas Félix Deltour (8 September 1822, Paris – 12 November 1904) was a 19th-century French latinist, educated at the Lycée Louis-le-Grand and the École normale supérieure. He then taught at various schools, was appointed academy inspector in 1871, Cabinet Secretary in the Ministry of Public Instruction in 1875 and served from 1879 as Inspector General of lower education.

== Works ==
- De Sallustio Catonis imitatore, seu quid, in scriptis C. Crispi Sallustii, ad imitationem M. Porcii Catonis censorii referri possit (1859). Paris, éd. Durand
- Les ennemis de Racine au XVIIe siècle. Didier et Durand, Paris 1857
- (in coll. with Charles Rinn) Choix de morceaux traduits des auteurs latins (Hachette, 1887)
- Histoire de la littérature romaine, éditions Charles Delagrave, Paris (1887-1889)

== Sources ==
Joseph Meyer; et al. (1879). "Racine, Jean". Meyers Konversations-Lexikon (4e : 1888–1890 ed.).
