= Eugène Lefèvre-Pontalis =

French archeologist and academic

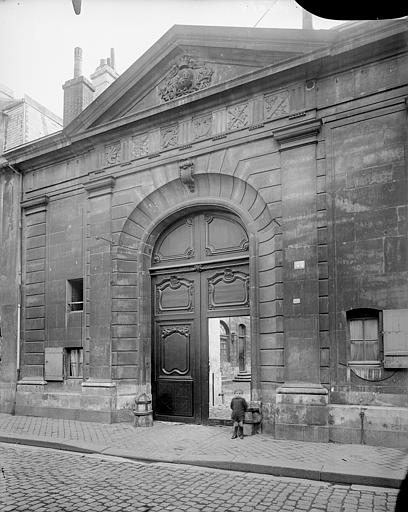
One of Lefèvre-Pontalis'es photographs

Eugène Lefèvre-Pontalis (12 February 1862 – 31 October 1923) was a French medievalist and archeologist.

Following his studies at the Lycée Condorcet, in 1881 he entered the École Nationale des Chartes, where he wrote a thesis on religious architecture in the former Diocese of Soissons in the 11th and 12th centuries. During his studies, he worked at the Mazarine Library and apprenticed with Alphonse Simil, an architect in the Commission des Monuments historiques.

In 1894, he was given an assistant position in medieval archaeology at the École Nationale des Chartes, where he became a professor in 1911. In that same year, Lefèvre-Pontalis was appointed president of the Société française d’archéologie and, in 1916, of the Société nationale des antiquaires.

He founded the Société des amis de la cathédrale de Reims to help restore the Cathedral of Notre-Dame, Reims after World War I.

At his death, he gave his 14,000 photographs to the Société française d’archéologie.
