= Jean-Louis Crémieux-Brilhac =

French journalist and Resistance member

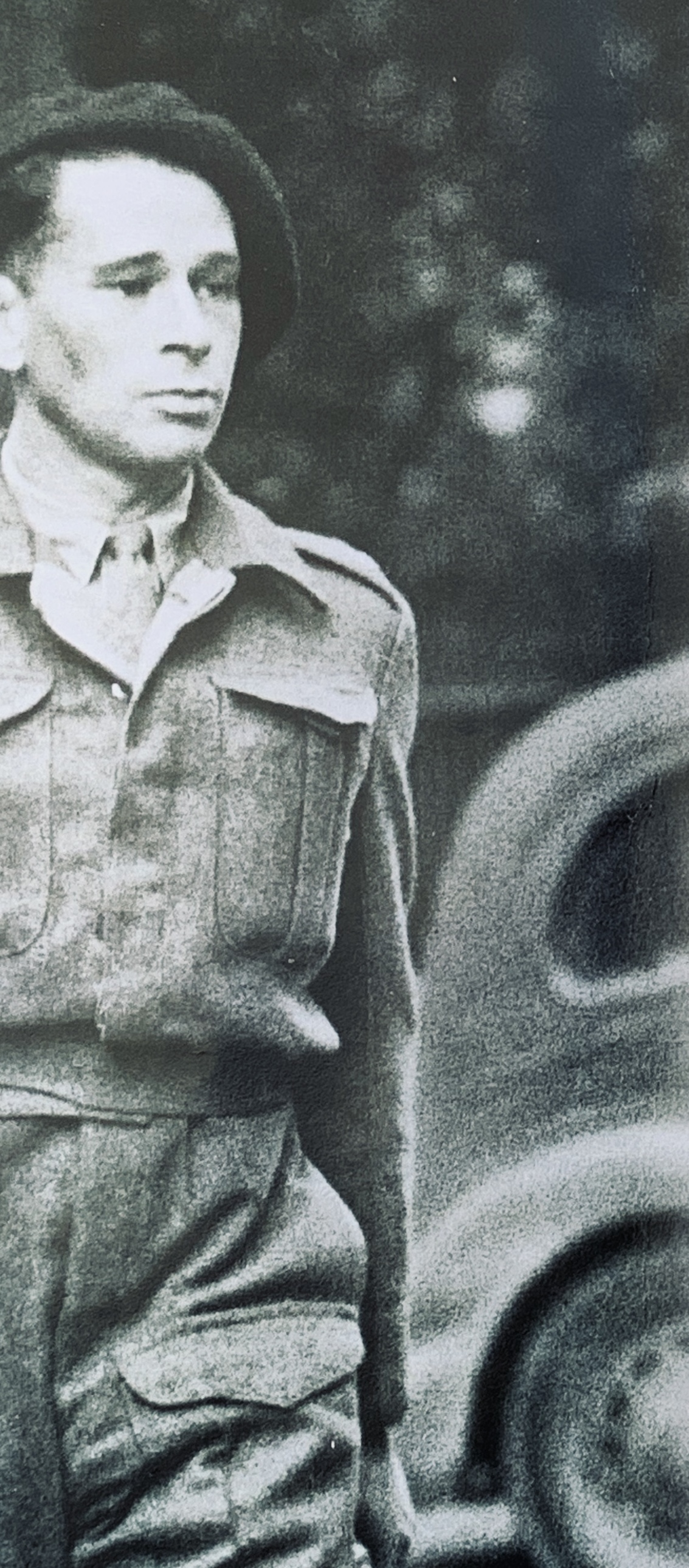
- Crémieux-Brilhac in 1941
- Born: 22 January 1917; Colombes, France
- Died: 8 April 2015 (aged 98); Paris, France
- Occupation: Historian

Jean-Louis Crémieux-Brilhac CBE (22 January 1917 – 8 April 2015) was a French journalist, a member of the French Resistance and a historian. During World War II he directed the Free French propaganda radio broadcasts to Europe. After the war he helped create France's state-owned publishing house, La Documentation Française.

== Early life ==
Crémieux was born to a middle class Jewish family in the Colombes suburb of Paris. His political awareness was raised in high school by his uncle Benjamin Crémieux (1888-1944), a literary critic. Through his uncle, Crémieux met and was influenced by the anti-authoritarian surrealism of André Malraux and the liberal internationalism of Stefan Zweig. He graduated from the Lycée Condorcet in 1933. But it was first during a school vacation in 1931 that he visited Germany and in subsequent trips saw first-hand the work of the Nazi Party. In 1935, he joined, and became the youngest member of the Comité de vigilance des intellectuels antifascistes (CVIA) which spearheaded the unification of left-wing politics in France.

During the Second World War he served as General Charles de Gaulle's 'propaganda chief in London'.

== Honours ==
2016: Knight Grand Cross in the Legion of Honour.
