= Banque de Paris et des Pays-Bas =

French investment bank based in Paris

Banque de Paris et des Pays-Bas S.A.
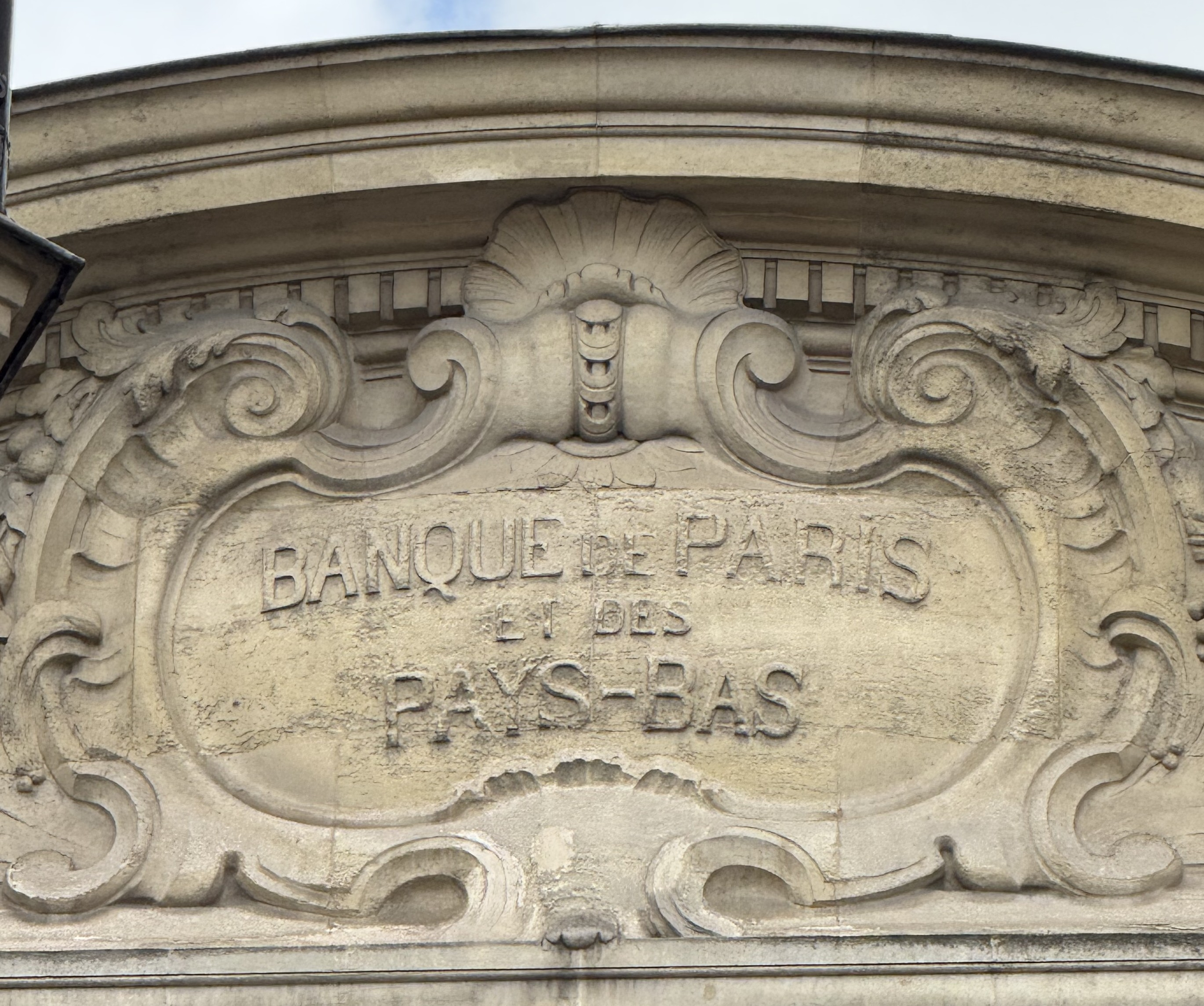
- The name of the bank inscribed on its head office complex at 5, rue d'Antin in Paris
- Type: Société anonyme
- Traded as: Paris Bourse: PRB
- Industry: Banking
- Predecessor: Banque de Crédit et de Dépôt des Pays-Bas; Banque de Paris
- Founded: 27 January 1872
- Founder: Henri Bamberger, Adolphe-Ernest Fould, Eugène Goüin, Edouard Hentsch, Edmond Joubert, Henri Cernuschi
- Defunct: 22 May 2000
- Successor: BNP Paribas
- Headquarters: Paris, France
- Website: paribas.com at the Wayback Machine (archived 1996-11-03)

The Banque de Paris et des Pays-Bas (French pronunciation: [bɑ̃k də paʁi e de pei ba], lit. 'Bank of Paris and the Netherlands'), generally referred to from 1982 as Paribas (French pronunciation: [paʁiba]), was a French investment bank based in Paris. In May 2000, it merged with the Banque Nationale de Paris to form BNP Paribas.

== History ==
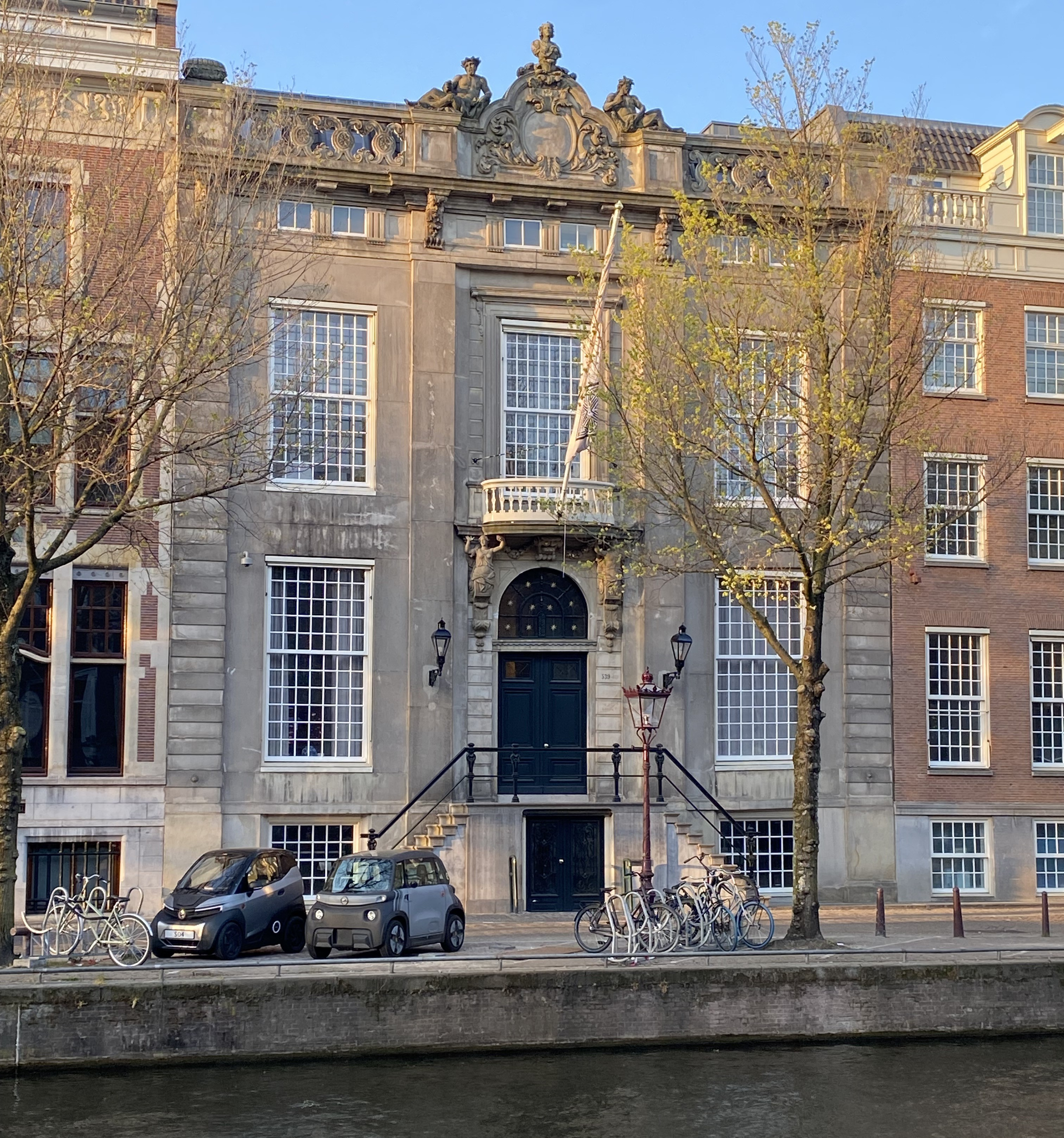
Urban mansion at Herengracht 539 in Amsterdam, formerly seat of the NCDB founded in 1863

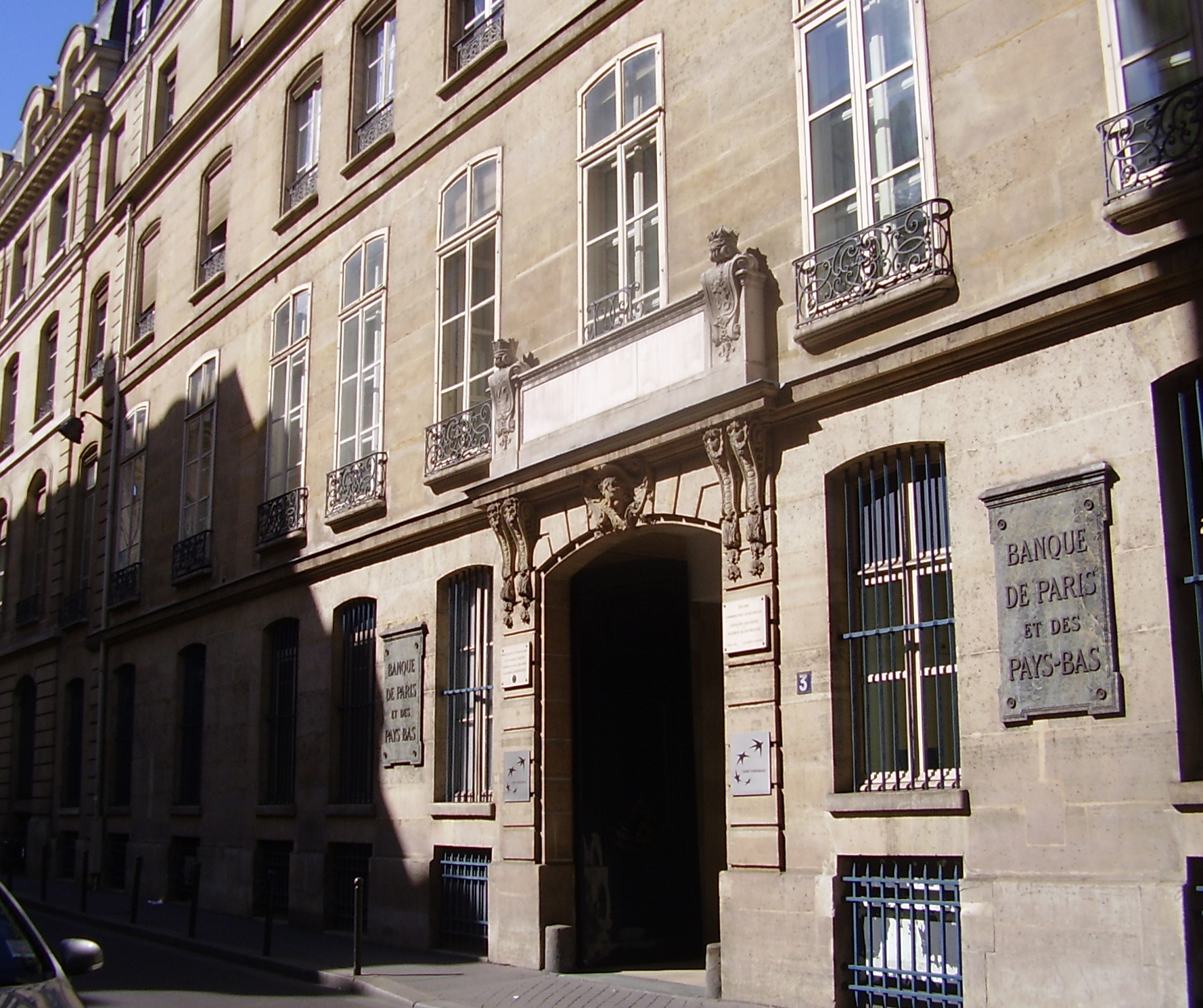
Hotel de Mondragon at 3 rue d'Antin in Paris, successively seat of the Banque de Paris (1869–1872), Banque de Paris et des Pays-Bas (1872–2000), and BNP Paribas (2000–2023)

=== Background ===
In the early 1820s, Louis-Raphaël Bischoffsheim founded a private banking establishment in Amsterdam in his own name. His brother Jonathan-Raphaël created a branch in Antwerp in 1827 before settling in Brussels in 1836. Having married Henriette Goldschmidt, the daughter of Frankfurt banker Hayum-Salomon Goldschmidt, Louis-Raphaël Bischoffsheim established the Bischoffsheim, Goldschmidt & Cie bank in Paris in 1846, then in London in 1860. In 1863 he merged these banks into the Nederlandsche Credit- en Deposito Bank (NCDB, "Dutch Credit and Deposit Bank"; French: Banque de Crédit et de Dépôt des Pays-Bas), which he had founded in Amsterdam: the Bischoffsheim family thereby established a powerful multinational banking conglomerate.

Separately in 1869, a group of bankers and investors including Adrien Delahante, Edmond Joubert and Henri Cernuschi, with the private bankers Eugène Goüin (Tours), Adolphe-Ernest Fould of the Fould family, E. et A. Schnapper Stern (Paris), Brugmann (Brussels), Tietgen (Copenhagen), founded the Banque de Paris, with its headquarters near the Opera at 3 rue d'Antin, Paris.

=== Creation and initial growth ===
The two banks, Banque de Crédit et de Dépôt des Pays-Bas and Banque de Paris, merged on January 27, 1872, to form the Banque de Paris et des Pays-Bas.

During its first year of existence, the new bank joined forces with Crédit Lyonnais to head the financial consortium set up to float one-third of the Franco-Prussian War indemnity loan of 3 billion francs for the French government. The major part of the funds raised by Banque de Paris et des Pays-Bas came through its Brussels outlet as a result of the close relations established with certain German financiers.

After a few years of collegial governance, the bank was chaired by François-Ernest Dutilleul from 1876 to 1894, then by Goüin from 1895 to his death in 1909. During that period it led or participated in major government loans, and in share or bond issues for French and foreign private companies. Most noteworthy among these were:

- government loans for France, Belgium and their respective colonial empires;
- public loan issues in France or Imperial Russia (from 1888 onwards);
- issues for the Balkan states (often in association with German banks), for the Scandinavian countries and for Morocco, with the creation of the Moroccan Debt Administration in 1904;
- issues in the 1880s and 1900s for Latin America (frequently in association with British houses such as Barings Bank).

=== Developments in the 20th century ===
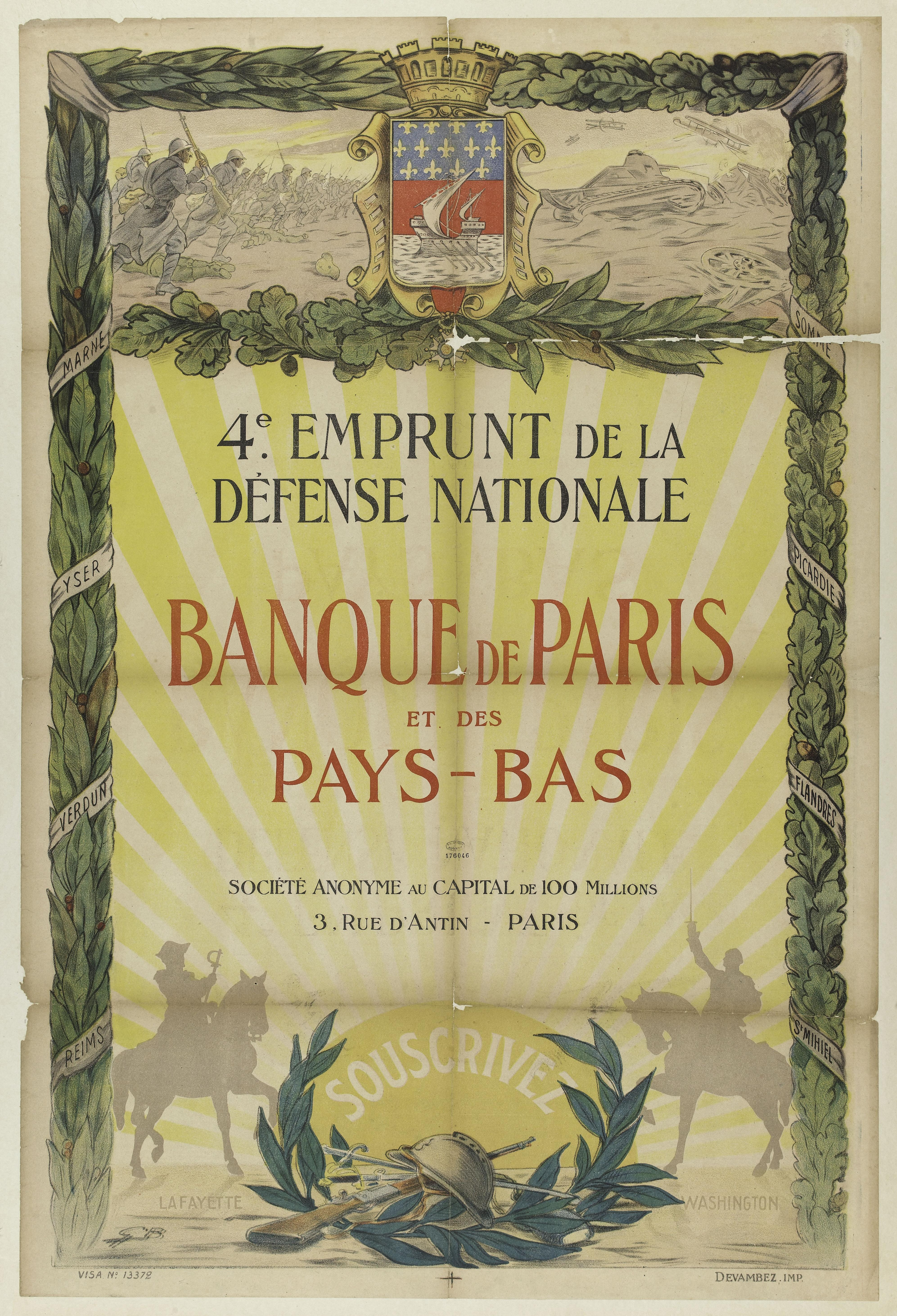
Advertisement for a Banque de Paris et des Pays-Bas issued war bond from 1918

During World War I it helped the French government raise funds through war loans, the 'Bons de la Défense Nationale', and it played its part in negotiations to open credit accounts for the French Treasury in Spain, the Netherlands, Switzerland and Sweden. It also helped to raise finance for the weapons industry (Compagnie Nationale de Matières Colorantes et de Produits Chimiques).

The impact of inflation during the 1920s, combined with the reconstruction effort and moves to expand the bank's activities under the guidance of Horace Finaly (at the head of the bank from 1919 to 1937) led to an increase in the banks capital and further investment in industrial concerns and public utilities.

World War II eroded its capital and the bank was cut off from its affiliates and correspondent banking partners in the allied countries. It lost a portion of its foreign assets in Central Europe and Norway. Nevertheless, it helped in the development of industrial patents for such products as alternative fuels, gas producing substances and oil-shale.

Its merchant-banking profile had enabled it to sidestep nationalization in 1945 and Paribas was able to take full advantage of the legislation of 2 December 1945 and 17 May 1946, which ratified the status of a full-service bank. The bank was thus poised to develop its activities freely in commercial banking for French companies and, before long, on an international scale.

The 1960s to 1980 saw Paribas start an investment bank in New York which it expanded into an internal banking network with offices in a number of countries and started an asset management services to private and institutional clients. Claude de Kemoularia was an important executive in the bank during this period. It also directs its activity towards businesses and participates in the development and restructuring of French industry including names such as Bull, CSF, Thomson.

Paribas logo in the 1990s

The bank was nationalized in 1982 by the government led by Pierre Mauroy under President François Mitterrand, as part of a wave of nationalization that included five major industrial companies, thirty-nine depository banks, and the two investment banks Indosuez and Paribas. That same year, the bank adopted its longstanding telegraph address "Paribas" for its brand and corporate identity. Paribas was re-privatized in January 1987 by the government led by Jacques Chirac.

In 1998, Paribas acquired the Compagnie Bancaire and subsequently renamed itself Compagnie Financière de Paribas.

In 1999, Banque Nationale de Paris and Société Générale fought a complex battle on the stock market, with Société Générale bidding for Paribas and BNP bidding for Société Générale and counter-bidding for Paribas. BNP's bid for Société Générale failed, but its bid for Paribas succeeded. As a consequence, the merger of BNP and Paribas was completed one year later, on 22 May 2000, forming BNP Paribas.

== Leadership ==
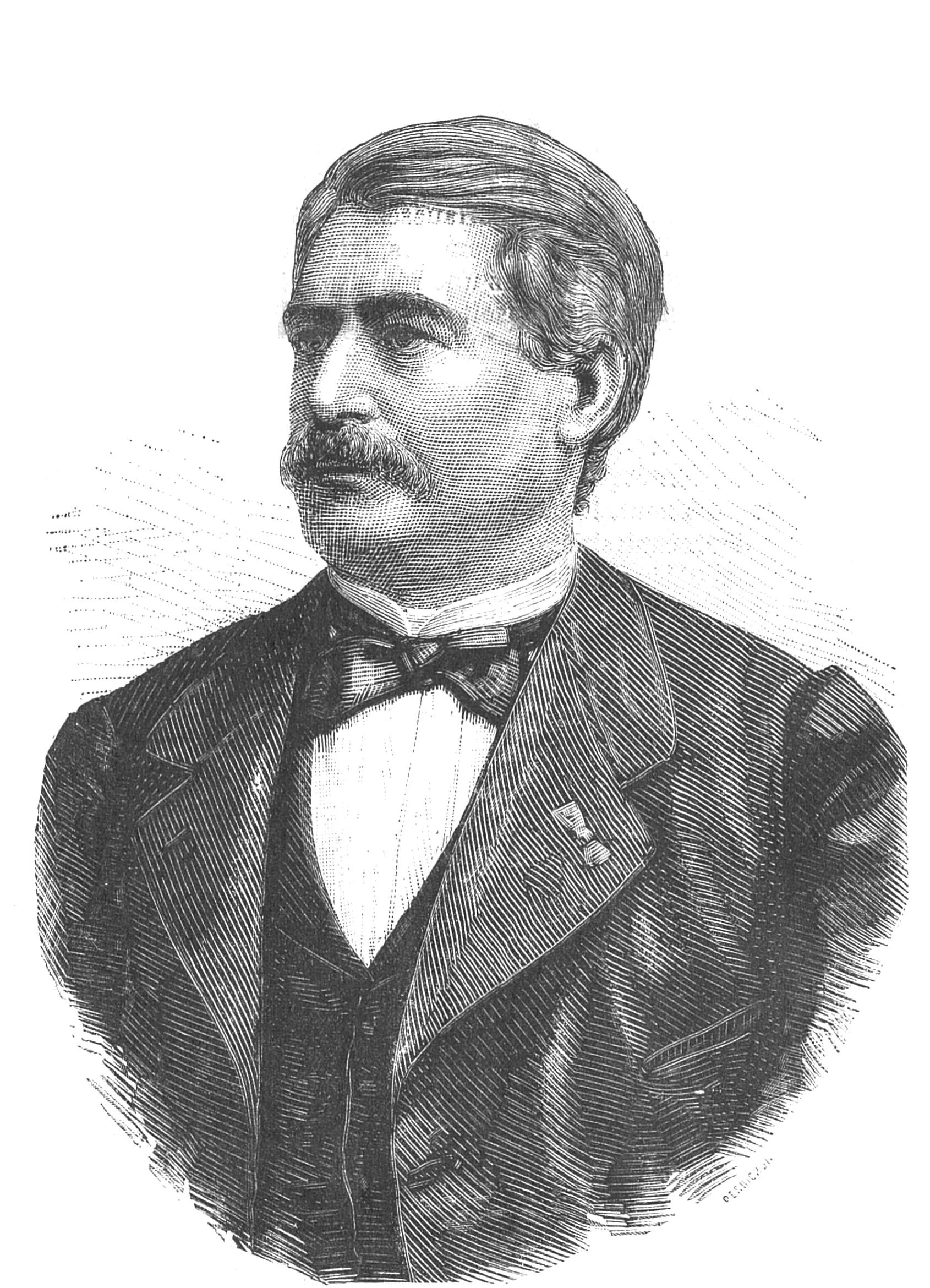
Charles Sautter, the bank's first chief executive

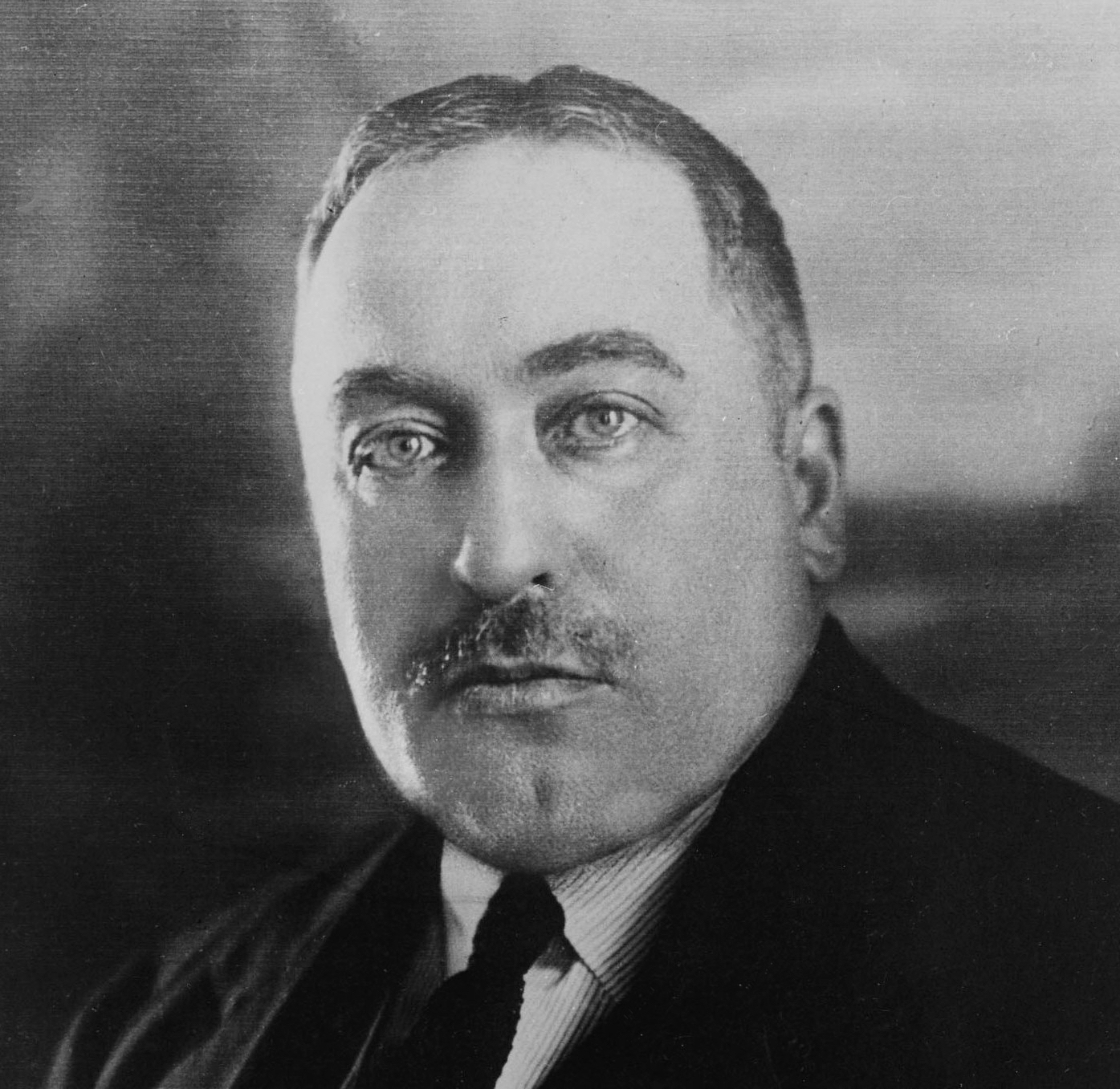
Horace Finaly, the bank's charismatic interwar leader

- Charles Sautter, Directeur Général 1872-1877
- François-Ernest Dutilleul, Président du Conseil d'Administration 1877-1894
- Edmond Joubert, Président 1894-1895
- Eugène Goüin, Président 1895-1909
- Léopold Renouard, Président 1909-1910
- Charles Demachy, Président 1910-1911
- Edouard Noetzlin, Président 1911-1914
- Gaston Griolet, Président 1915-1930
- Horace Finaly, Directeur Général 1919-1937
- Jules Cambon, Président 1930-1931
- Émile Moreau, Président 1931-1940
- André Laurent-Atthalin, Directeur Général 1937-1940, then Président-Directeur Général (PDG) 1940-1945
- Louis Wibratte, PDG 1945-1949
- Jean Reyre, Directeur Général 1948-1966, then PDG 1967-1969
- Emmanuel Monick, PDG 1949-1962
- Henri Deroy, PDG 1962-1967
- Claude balivet, Directeur Général 1966-1969
- Pierre Moussa, Directeur Général 1969-1978, then PDG 1978-1981
- Jacques de Fouchier, PDG 1969-1978, then (after a gap) PDG 1981-1982
- François Morin, Directeur Général 1978-1999
- Gérard Eskénazi, Directeur Général 1978-1999
- Jean-Yves Haberer, PDG 1982-1986
- Michel François-Poncet, PDG 1986-1990, then Président du conseil de surveillance 1991-1999
- André Lévy-Lang, Président du directoire 1991-1999

== Notable buildings ==
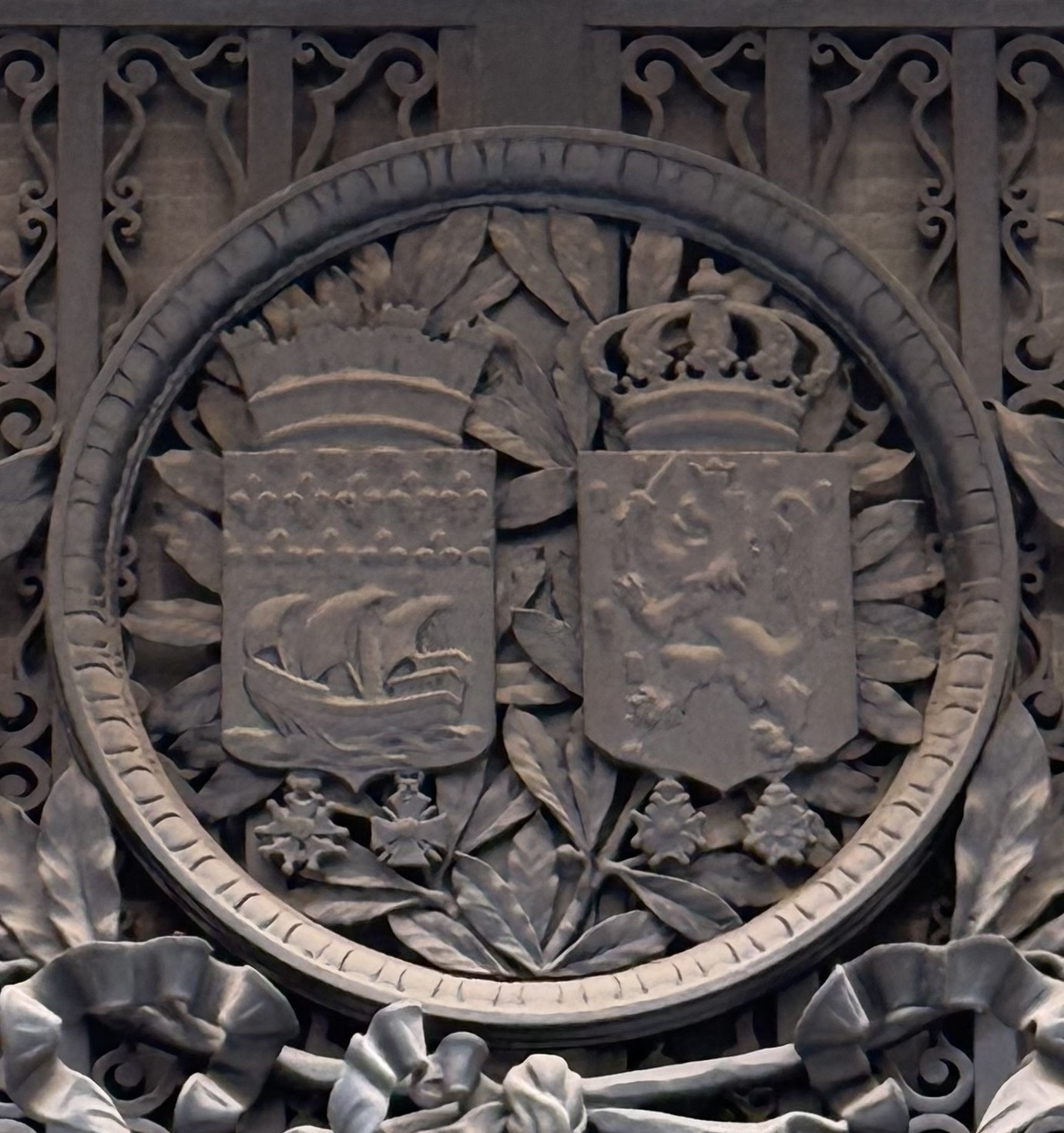
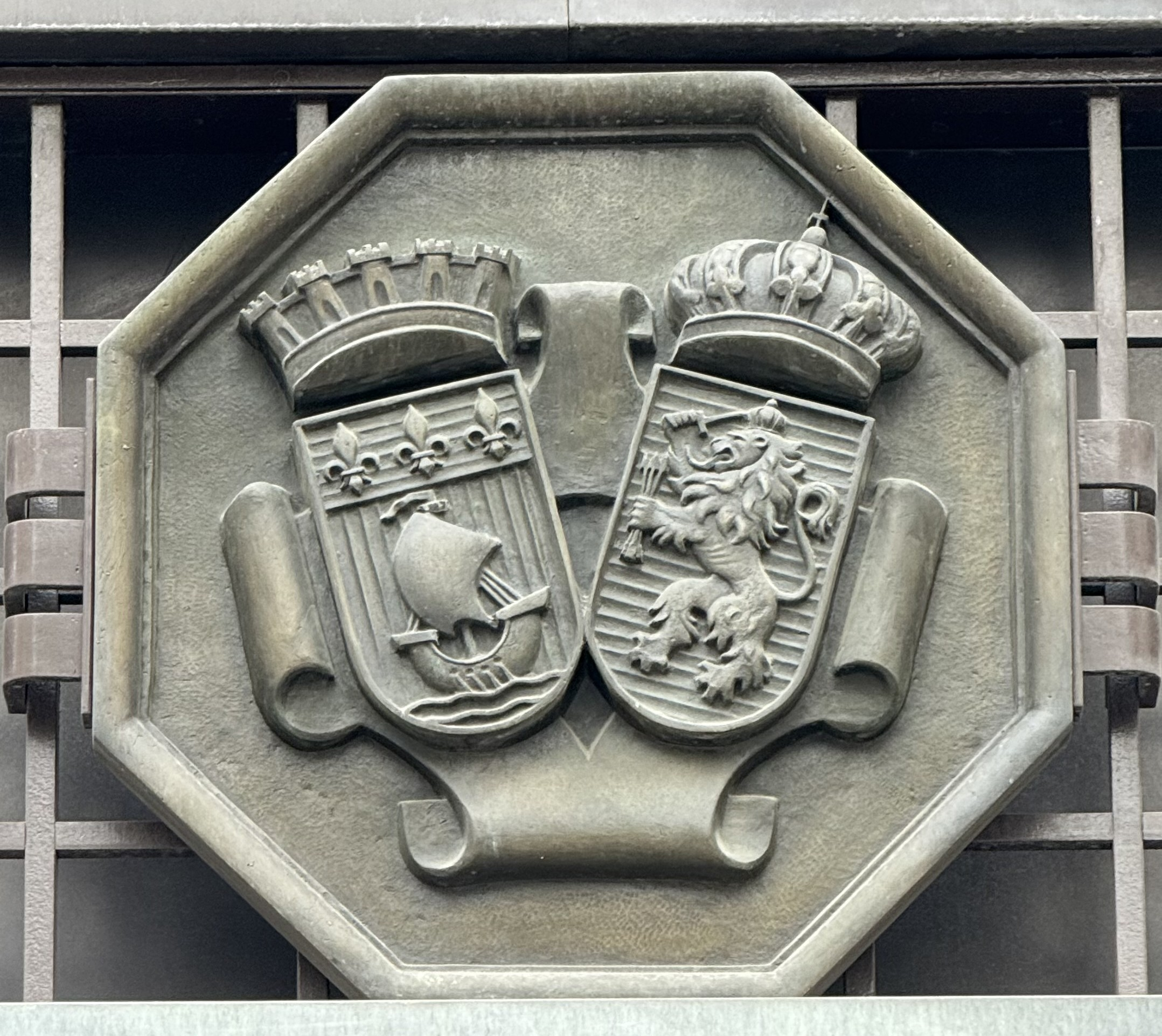
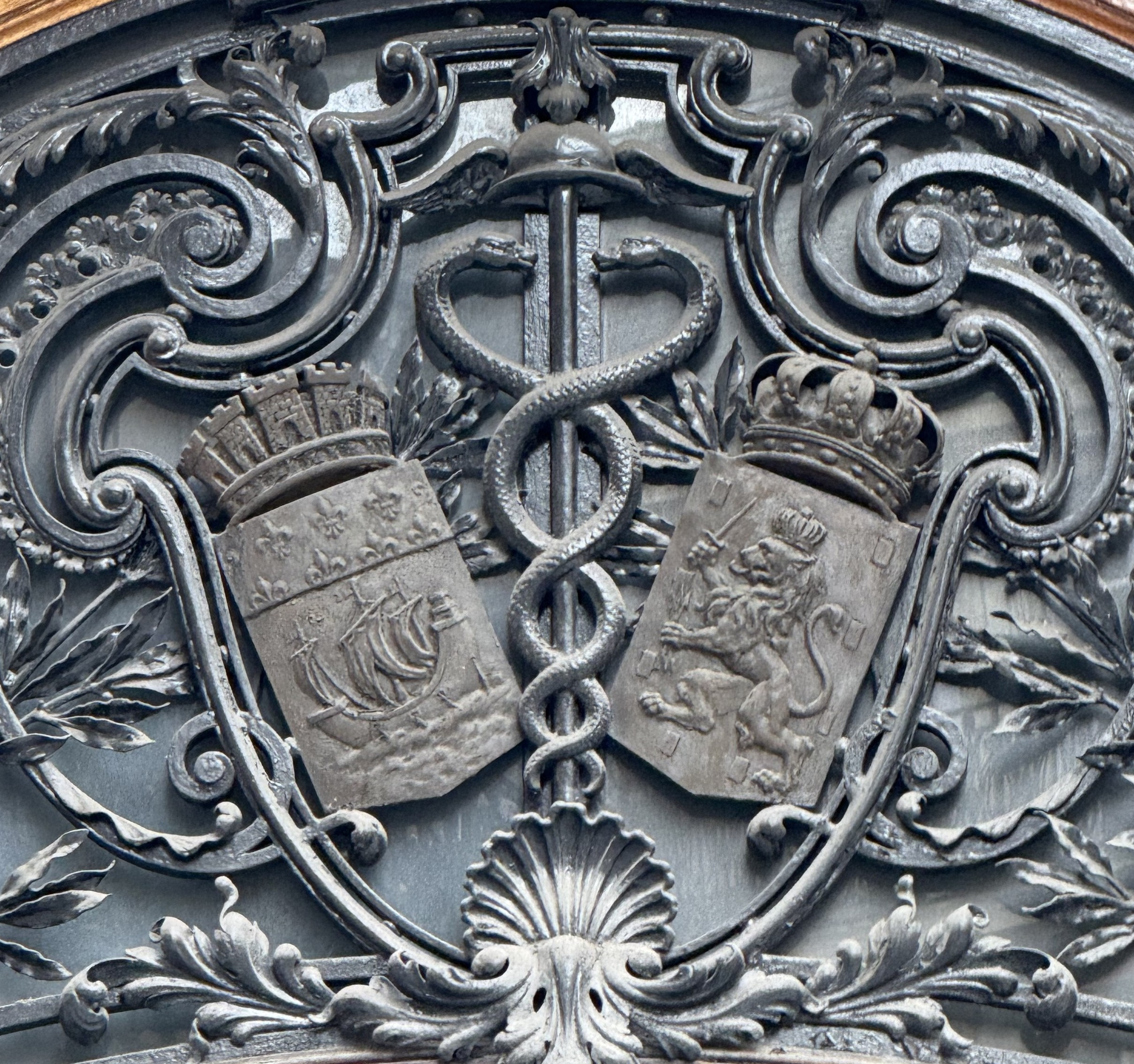
Emblems of Paris and the Netherlands on the bank's Parisian head office

In Amsterdam, the Banque de Crédit et de Dépôt des Pays-Bas (until 1872) then the Banque de Paris et des Pays-Bas (from 1872 onwards) were headquartered in the 18th-century mansion at Herengracht 539, then expanded to the adjacent properties at Herengracht 541 and 543. In the 1960s, No. 541 was entirely rebuilt to extend it to nearly twice its size at the back. The property was then successively inherited by Banque Paribas Nederland in 1984, Banque Artesia Nederland in 1998, and GE Artesia Bank in 2006. After GE terminated Artesia Bank's operations in the Netherlands in 2015, the property was refurbished by developer REB Projects into luxury apartments and offices at Herengracht 541, the latter used as headquarters by Rituals Cosmetics Trade BV, part of cosmetics group Rituals. The apartment complex, branded The Artesia and completed in 2018, also includes a series of structures across the urban block on Reguliersdwarsstraat and a garden between the two sets of buildings.

In Paris, the Banque de Paris, upon formation in 1869, purchased the former hôtel Bourgeois de Boigne also known as Hôtel de Mondragon at 3, rue d'Antin (erected around 1730, designed by Jean-Baptiste Leroux). That historic mansion became the Parisian head office of the BPPB following the merger in 1872. In 1875, the BPPB acquired the adjacent mansion at No. 3 bis (erected in the early 18th century, designed by Jacques Gabriel), and in the 1950s, the nearby building at No. 5 (erected 1899, designed by Henri Sauvage). Following the 2000 merger, the complex hosted the offices of the chairman and CEO of BNP Paribas, even as the group's registered office was at the former BNP headquarters at 12, boulevard des Italiens. In 2023, the executive offices were relocated to the latter property, and BNP Paribas sold the historic complex on rue d'Antin.

The Compagnie Bancaire, acquired by Paribas in 1998, was headquartered in a modern building at 5, avenue Kléber in Paris. That building was remodeled in 2011 to become the head office of SCOR SE, which relocated there in March 2012.

== Controversies ==
=== Oil pre financing ===
Historically, Paribas has been actively involved in the financing of oil markets and had strong relations with Standard Oil. This was one of the reasons that Paribas was chosen in the funding agreement in the Iraq Oil-for-Food Programme. The technique of oil pre-financing consists of loans secured on future oil revenues. It was developed in the 1970s by Marc Rich and his commodities brokerage Glencore and has been designated by the UN and the World Bank as a cause of impoverishment of oil producing countries and as one of key phenomena of kleptocracy.

=== Paribas Luxembourg ===
Paribas Luxembourg was closely linked to controversial Iraq business man Nadhmi Auchi. Links date back to the 1970s with the jointly controlled Continental Bank of Luxembourg. In early 1990, Auchi was the largest shareholder in Paribas with 12% share through Auchi's holding company General Mediterranean Holdings or GenMed. He played a key role in Paribas involvement of the Iraq Oil for Food programme signed by Saddam Hussein and the UN. Auchi played a major role in the BNP Paribas merger.

=== Arms sales to Angola ===
Judge Philippe Courroye investigated the role played by Banque Paribas in the case of arms sales to Angola in what became known as the Mitterrand–Pasqua affair. Between 1995 and 1997, the bank clearing department, then headed by Alain Bernard, funded $573 million of arms sales between Russia and Angola, according to Judge Courroye's investigations. Jean-Didier Maille, Alain Bernard's deputy, set up the financing and the two men would have received $30 million in commissions in foreign accounts for their actions. During Jean-Didier Maille's hearing in the investigation he said "the management was aware Paribas activities ... Alain Bernard ... Everyone knew he was paying commissions ... We called these activities: Special Affairs." For its part, André Levy-Lang, CEO of Paribas subsidiary the Compagnie Bancaire said he was not aware of this case and the fees charged by Alain Bernard and Jean-Didier Maille.

== See also ==
- List of banks in France
