= Gabriel Peignot =

French bibliographer (1767–1849)

- Gabriel Peignot
- Born: Étienne-Gabriel Peignot; 15 May 1767; Arc-en-Barrois (Haute-Marne)
- Died: 14 August 1849 (aged 82); Dijon
- Occupation: Bibliographer

Étienne-Gabriel Peignot (French: [ɡabʁijɛl peɲo]; 15 May 1767 – 14 August 1849) was a 19th-century French bibliographer.

== Biography ==
First a lawyer in Besançon, Gabriel Peignot was a librarian and inspector of several institutions. He was a member of the Académie celtique of Paris, and of several literary societies.

Peignot was one of the most famous bibliographers of his time. Pierre Larousse in his edition of the 19th century encyclopedia states:

Peignot was the most learned bibliographer of this century. His learning was immense. To in-depth science books, he joined informed criticism. [...] His bibliographic taste had become a passion of which old books were mainly the object. This spiritual, gay, hard-working, selfless scholar composed innumerable small writings, most printed in small numbers, and much sought by curious; they dealt with spiky or little known features.

Gabriel Peignot published a book, Le Livre des singularités (1841), under the pseudonym "G.P. Philomneste".

== Works ==
- 1800: Petite bibliothèque choisie, Paris
- 1801: Manuel Bibliographique, Paris, Villier, 1801.
- 1802: Dictionnaire raisonné de bibliologie, Paris, Antoine-Augustin Renouard, 2 vol., and Supplément, 1804
- 1804: Essai de curiosités bibliographiques, Paris, Antoine-Augustin Renouard, (An) XIII).
- 1802: Dictionnaire critique, littéraire et bibliographique des principaux livres condamnés au feu, supprimés ou censurés, précédé d'un discours sur ces sortes d'ouvrages, Paris, Antoine-Augustin Renouard, 2 vol.
- 1804: Essai de curiosités bibliographiques
- 1808: Amusemens philologiques ou variétés en tout genres, Paris, Renouard & Allais
- 1810: Répertoire de Bibliographies Spéciales, Curieuses et Instructives, contenant la Notice raisonnée, 1. Des Ouvrages imprimés à petit nombre d'exemplaires; 2. Des livres dont on a tiré des exemplaires sur papier de couleur; 3. des livres dont le texte est gravé; et 4. des Livres qui ont paru sous le nom d'Ana. Le tout rédigé et publié avec des remarques historiques, littéraires et critiques, Paris, Renouard & Allais.
- 1812: Répertoire bibliographique universel. Contenant la Notice raisonnée des Bibliographies spéciales publiées jusqu’à ce jour, Etc. Paris, Antoine-Augustin Renouard.
- 1817: Traité du Choix des Livres, contenant 1 Des observations sur la nature des ouvrages les plus propres à former une collection peu considérable, mais précieuse sous le rapport du goût; 2 Des recherches littéraires sur la prédilection particulière, Paris et Dijon, Antoine-Augustin Renouard and Victor Lagier.
- 1817: Recherches sur les ouvrages de Voltaire
- 1817: Précis historique des concordats, pragmatiques, etc.
- 1818: Mélanges littéraires, philologiques et bibliographiques.
- 1820: Recherches historiques, littéraires et bibliographiques sur la vie et les ouvrages de M. de La Harpe.
- 1821: Essai chronologique sur les hivers les plus rigoureux, depuis 396 ans av. J. C., jusqu'en 1820 inclusivement; suivi de quelques recherches sur les effets les plus singuliers de la foudre, depuis 1676, jusqu'en 1821, Paris et Dijon, A.-A. Renouard et V. Lagier.
- 1822: Variétés, notices et raretés bibliographiques.
- 1822: ''Des Comestibles et Des Vins de la Grece et de L'Italie, en usage chez les Romains. Dijon, 1822.
- 1823: Manuel du Bibliophile, ou Traité du Choix des Livres, Contenant des développements sur la nature des ouvrages les plus propres à former une collection précieuse, Dijon, Victor Lagier, 1823 (réédition augmentée du Traité du choix des livres).
- 1826: Recherches sur la Danse des morts et sur l'origine des cartes à jouer.
- 1827: Documents authentiques et détails curieux sur les dépenses de Louis XIV, en bâtiments et chateaux royaux (particulièrement Versailles) ; en gratifications et en pensions accordées aux savans, gens de lettres et artistes, depuis 1663 ; en établissemens, monumens, etc., etc. d'après un manuscrit du temps de Colbert, récemment découvert à Dijon, Paris et Dijon, Jules Renouard and Victor Lagier.
- 1829: Choix de testamens anciens et modernes, remarquables par leur importance, leur singularité, ou leur bizarrerie, Dijon et Paris, Victor Lagier and Renouard.
- 1829: Histoire d'Hélène Gillet, ou Relation d'un Evenement Extraordinaire et Tragique, Survenu a Dijon dans le XVIIth Siecle; Suivie d'une Notice sur des Lettres Grâce Singulieres, Expediees au XVIe... Par un Ancien Avocat, Dijon, Victor Lagier.
- 1829: Recherches historiques sur la personne de J.-C., sur celle de Marie et sur sa famille.
- 1830: La Champagne vengée, ode anacréontique dédiée à tous les gourmets, amis de leur pays. Par un Bourguignon resté Champenois. Dijon, Decailly and Cretenet. Anonymous publication, mentioned by Georges Vicaire who didn't indicate the name of the author. It could be Peignot, although his three bibliographers, Simonnet, R Deschamps and P. Milsand, do not cite this title. It is an imitation in French of the famous ode by Coffin on vin de Champagne. The author points out that he offers this poem to his former as to his new compatriots, as a Champenois who for over twenty years, has nothing but praise for the reception of the Burgundians.
- 1832: Essai historique sur la liberté d'écrire chez les anciens et au moyen age; sur la liberté de la presse depuis le quinzième siècle, et sur les moyens de répression dont ces libertés ont été l'objet dans tous les temps; avec beaucoupt d'anecdotes et de notes; suivi d'un tableau synoptique de l'état des imprimeries en France, en 1704, 1739, 1810, 1830, et d'une chronologie des lois sur la presse de 1789 a 1831, Paris, Crapelet.
- 1832: Nouvelles Recherches Chronologiques, Littéraires et Philologiques sur la Vie et les Ouvrages de Bernard de la Monnoye.
- 1832: P. Bérigal [Gabriel Peignot], L'illustre Jaquemart de Dijon [...], Dijon, V. Lagier, XVI-91 p.
- 1833: Histoire morale, civile, politique et littéraire du charivari, depuis son origine, vers le IVe par le Docteur Calybariat; suivi du complément de l'histoire des charivaris par Eloi-Christophe Bassinet, Paris, Librairie Delaunay.
- 1834: Essai analytique sur l'origine de la langue française, et sur un recueil de monumens de cette langue, Mémoires de l'Académie des Sciences, Arts et Belles-Lettres de Dijon.
- 1834: Essai sur la reliure des livres.
- 1836: Recherches sur les autographes et sur l'autographie.
- 1837: Recherches sur Le Luxe des Romains dans leur Ameublement avec des notes, Dijon, Victor Lagier.
- 1841: Recherches sur le tombeau de Virgile au mont Pausilippe.
- 1841: Le Livre des singularités par G.P. Philomneste auteur des amusements philologiques, Dijon et Paris, Victor Lagier & Pelissonnier (available at Gallica).
- 1841: Catalogue d'une partie des livres composant la bibliothèque des Ducs de Bourgogne, au XVe. Seconde édition revue et augmentee du catalogue de la bibliothèque des Dominicains historiques, philologiques et bibliographiques, Dijon.
- 1841: Predicatoriana ou révélations singulières et amusantes sur les prédicateurs, entremêlées d'extraits piquants des sermons bizarres et facétieux, prêchés tant en France qu'à l'étranger, notamment dans les xve, xvie et xviie siècles, suivies de quelques mélanges, Dijon, Victor Lagier.
- 1865: Notice chronologique de tous les Souverains, Princes et Princesses d'Europe qui ont péri de mort violente ou qui ont été exposés aux attentats des assassins de 1487 à 1840, Paris, Aug. Aubry.

== Bibliography ==
- Pierre Deschamps, Notice biographique et bibliographique sur G. Peignot, Paris, 1857 (available at Gallica)
- Émile Peignot, Lettres de Gabriel Peignot à son ami N.-D. Baulmont, Dijon, Lamarche et Drouelle, 1857 (available at Gallica)
- Jules Simonnet, Essai sur la vie et les ouvrages de Gabriel Peignot, accompagné de pièces de vers inédites, Paris, Auguste Aubry, 1863 (available at Gallica)
- Marie Foiselle, Gabriel Peignot, écrivain et bibliophile, 1767-1849, Paris, éditions La Bruyère, 2003 (ISBN 2-84014-954-0)
