= Antoine-Augustin Renouard =

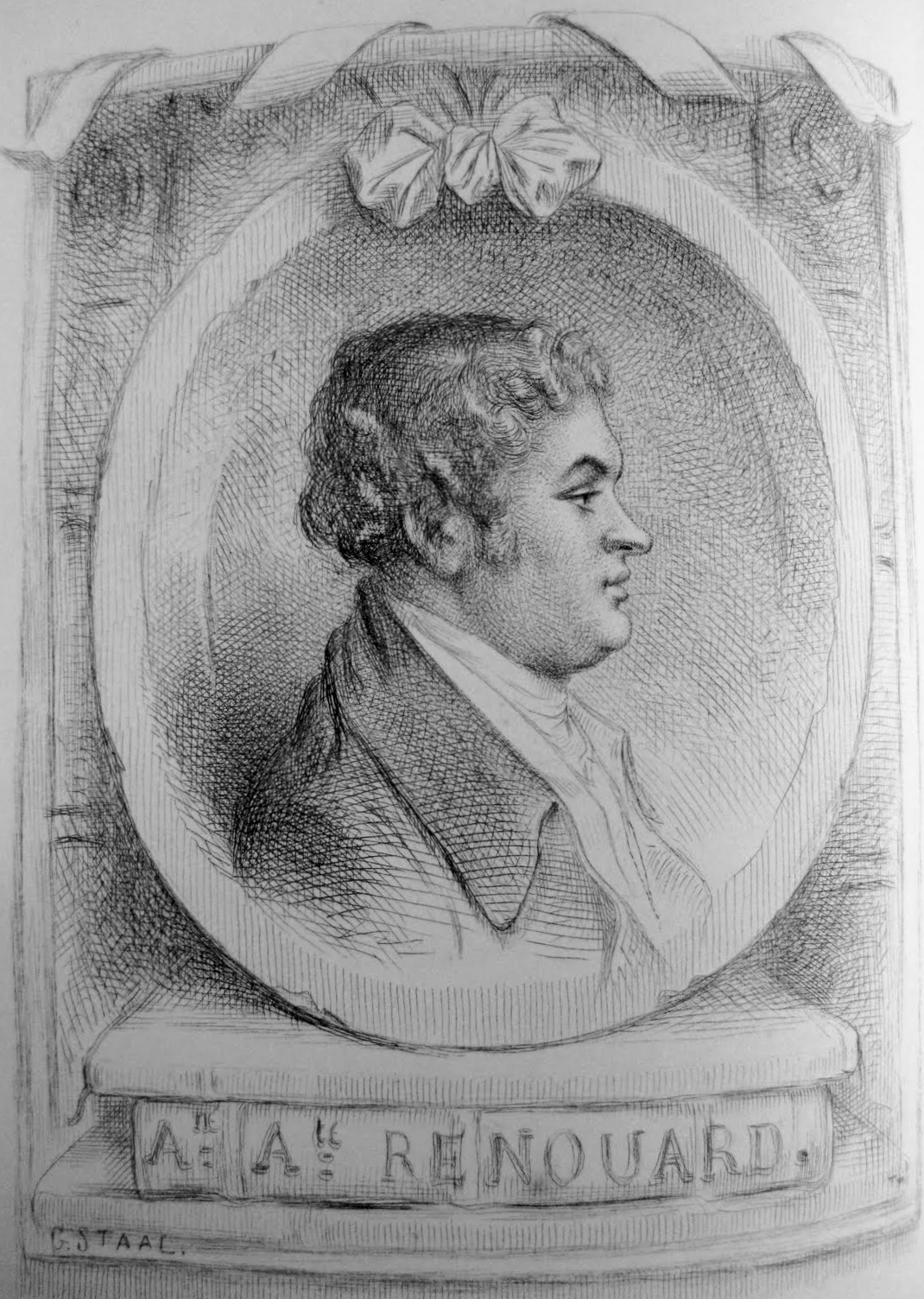
- Antoine-Augustin Renouard (1767-1853)
- Born: Georg Vinzenz Rüttimann; 21 September 1765; Paris, France
- Died: 15 December 1853 (aged 88); Saint-Valery-sur-Somme, Somme, France
- Occupations: Book dealer, publisher & bibliographer
- Spouse: Catherine de Saintes (1772-1858)
- Parent(s): Jacques-Augustin Renouard (1736-1806); Marie-Simone Oyon (1748-1821)

Antoine-Augustin Renouard (21 September 1765 – 15 December 1853) was an industrialist and political activist in Paris at the time of the French Revolution who became a book dealer, printer and bibliographer.

== Life ==
Renouard was born in Paris in 1765. His father, Jacques-Augustin Renouard (1736-1806) was a merchant and manufacturer, originally from Guise, who specialised in Gauze and Silk from premises in the centre of Paris. In 1781 Antoine-Augustin followed his father into the Gauze and Silk businesses, father and son working together from premises in the "rue Sainte-Apolline", in what would later become the city's 2nd arrondissement.

Antoine-Augustin Renouard was an active participant during the early years of the revolution, joining the Jacobins, and serving as a member of the Paris Commune General Council and, in 1793, a Civil Commissioner. He embarked in a career as a book dealer and publisher in 1792, while at the same time continuing to work in the Gauze and Silk businesses until approximately 1797. His early publications were of works in both Latin and the French vernacular, and were noteworthy for their elegance and precision. Many were enhanced with engravings by artists including Jean-Michel Moreau, Alexandre-Joseph Desenne and Pierre-Paul Prud'hon. For his publishing business Renouard used as a trademark the patriotic image of a cockerel above an anchor.

His business career was interrupted by the Thermidore coup d'état in July 1794 which led to the execution of the revolutionary leader Robespierre before the end of the month and the imprisonment of most of the members of the Paris Commune, including Renouard. He had recently married and his eldest son was born while he was still in prison. He was released on 3 December 1794, after which he seems to have concentrated on his book business, to the exclusion of high-profile political activism, till 1830.

After the 1830 revolution had put an end, for a second time, to the Bourbon monarchy in France, Renouard returned to front-line politics, becoming mayor of the 11th arrondissement of Paris. He was rewarded with the Legion of Honour in 1831.

In 1834 he was able to acquire the Abbey of Saint-Valery-sur-Somme, which had previously been a royal property, but was then declared a national asset and nationalised during the revolution, before being sold off to bolster state finances.

== Publications ==
As a publisher, Renouard's output included the following volumes:

- Coup-d'oeil sur les monnoies, sur leur administration et sur le ministre des contributions publiques, Paris : Garnery : Desenne, 1793
- Catalogue de la bibliothèque d'un amateur, 1819
- Annales de l'imprimerie des Alde, ou Histoire des trois Manuce et de leurs éditions, Paris, 1803-1812; 2nd edition Paris, 1825
- Annales de l'imprimerie des Alde, ou l'histoire des trois Manuce et de leurs éditions; 3rd} edition.
- Annales de l'imprimerie des Estienne, 1837 & 1843.
- Recueil de 123 fables en 5 livres, imitées d'Ésope. - Complété par l'"Appendix Perottina", contenant 30 ou 32 fables et le "Phaedrus solutus", contenant 30 autres fables
- Sorte de journal, écrit en grec, divisé actuellement en 12 livres, méditations sur la vanité des choses terrestres, Pensées : Antoine-Augustin Renouard (1765-1853) as éditeur scientifique

== Family ==
In 1794 Renouard married Catherine de Saintes (1772-1858), the illegitimate daughter of The Marquis of Beauchamps and the Countess Ferdinanda Louise de Horion (at the time of Ferdiandna Louise's birth the widowed third wife of Maximilian of Arberg). Renouard's five recorded children were:

- Augustin-Charles Renouard (1794-1878), magistrate, moralist and politician
- Eugénie Renouard (1795-1871)
- Jules Renouard (1794-1854), book dealer-editor
- Paul Renouard (1803-1871), consul and painter
- Hippolyte Renouard (1808-1871), squadron leader

Renouard's grandchildren included

- Albert Ricot (1826-1902), iron master and politician
- Léopold Renouard (1833-1910), financier and deputy governor of the Bank of France
- Georges Renouard (1843-1897) who became son-in-law to city planner Baron Haussmann
- Lucie Renouard who married the populist politician Général Boulanger
