= Léopold Renouard =

- Born: Jules-Léopold Renouard; 27 January 1833; Paris
- Died: 7 March 1910; Paris
- Occupation(s): Stockbroker; Financier/Banker; Bank director & governor
- Spouse: Marguerite Delamotte/Renouard (1836-1922)
- Children: Elisabeth Renouard (m. G.de Dampierre); Adèle Renouard (m. F.Ramey de Sugny)
- Parent(s): Jules Renouard (1798-1854); Adèle Cunin-Gridaine (1810–1834)

Jules-Léopold Renouard (27 January 1833 – 7 March 1910) was a stock broker, financier and banker from Paris.

== Life ==
Léopold Renouard was born in Paris. His father, Jules Renouard (1798–1854) was a Bibliographer and book dealer. Through his mother, Adèle Cunin-Gridaine (1810–1834) he was descended from Laurent Cunin-Gridaine, a politician and at the time a future Minister of Agriculture.

Between 1859 and 1872 Renouard worked as a stockbroker in Paris. In 1873 he was appointed a Finance Director for the city administration, soon after which he relocated to the south of the country, accepting an appointment as Treasurer and Paymaster General for the city of Tarbes, and from 1875 till 1877 taking a similar position for Pau. Returning to live in Paris in 1877 he was appointed the governor of the Crédit Foncier de France (national mortgage bank), a post which he held for a year.

He was recruited to the regency council of the Bank of France (set 5) in 1887, and in August 1889 became second deputy governor, and serving from 1895 to 1898 as first deputy governor. By this time he was also a member of the Société de l'histoire de France (French Historical Society) which he had joined in 1894.

In the commercial sector, in 1909 he became president of the Banque de Paris et des Pays-Bas S.A. (as Paribas was then known) following the death of the bank's remarkable founder-president, Eugène Goüin, who was a distant kinsman. Renoard was also the first president of the State Bank of Morocco, set up in 1907 in the wake of the Algeciras Conference. His other directorships, embraced the banking and industrial sectors, and included the Banco Español de Crédito, the Banque de l'Indochine, the Paris-Orléans Railway Company and the automobile manufacturer, Lorraine-Dietrich.

Jules-Léopold Renouard died aged 77. The death was registered at the prefecture by his brother-in-law, Georges Delamotte.

== Personal ==
On 31 March 1858 Renouard married Marguerite Delamotte. She came from a well placed family, and as a result of the marriage he acquired brothers in law including the admiral Joseph Ramey de Sugny and Count Gérard of Dampierre, a departmental councillor in Landes. The marriage resulted in two recorded daughters, named Elisabeth and Adèle.

== Awards and honours ==
Jules-Léopold Renouard was an officer of the Legion of Honour. Other awards included the Order of Isabella the Catholic, the Order of Saint Stanislaus and the Order of the Medjidie. He was also a grand officer of the Order of the Cross of Takovo and of the Order of Saint Alexander, and a commander of the Order of the Immaculate Conception of Vila Viçosa.
