= Jules Renouard =

French book dealer, editor and bibliographer (1798–1854)

- Born: 13 February 1798; Paris, France
- Died: 20 February 1854 (aged 56)
- Occupation(s): Book dealer Editor; Bibliographer; Judge in the Commercial Court
- Spouse(s): 1. Adèle Cunin-Grudaine; 1832: 2. Amélie Talabot; 1837
- Children: 6 including Léopold Renouard (1833–1910)
- Parent(s): Antoine-Augustin Renouard (1765–1853); Catherine de Beauchamps (ca 1771–1858)

Jules Renouard (13 February 1798 – 20 February 1854) was a French book dealer, editor and bibliographer.

== Life ==
Jules Renouard was born in Paris in the 11th arrondissement (under the city's pre-1860 district boundaries). His father was the industrialist-politician and book dealer Antoine-Augustin Renouard. His maternal grandfather was Charles-Grégoire de Beauchamps.

He attended the prestigious Lycée Louis-le-Grand (school) a few hundred meters to the south of the city centre, and then relocated to London where he began a business career, working for a banker. In 1826 he took over his father's book dealership, installing himself and his business in an imposing town house back in Paris.

Renouard married Adèle Cunin-Grudaine on 17 March 1832. Her father, Laurent Cunin-Gridaine, was an industrialist who had grown rich and become a politician. The marriage produced a son, Léopold Renouard (1833–1910) who in due course would become a leading Paris banker. However, in 1834 Adèle died, aged just 34. His second marriage was to Amélie Talabot (1810–1869)) and took place on 27 October 1837, producing in due course five recorded children including Georges Renouard (1843–1897) who much later would marry a daughter of Baron Haussmann, France's most famous city planner.

Renuard was a founder member of the Cercle de la librairie (Book dealers' association) founded in 1847, and himself delivered an important paper to the association in 1851 under the title "Progrès de la contrefaçon, dénonciation et protestation", protesting against the unfair trading practices of foreign competitors.

He was also a member of the Paris Chamber of Commerce and served as a judge at the Commercial Court in Paris.
