= Warranty Direct =

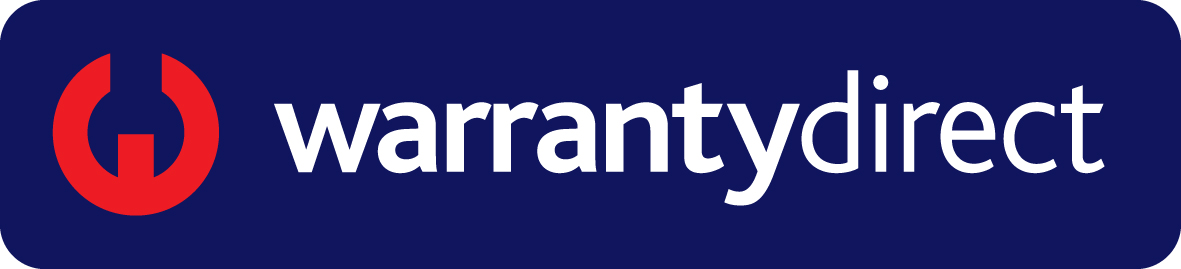
- Company type: Private company, limited shares
- Industry: Insurance
- Founded: June 1997
- Headquarters: United Kingdom
- Services: Warranty (car, van, bike); Guaranteed Asset Protection (GAP); Breakdown Repair Insurance
- Parent: FirstBaseFM Ltd.
- Website: WarrantyDirect.co.uk

Warranty Direct is a provider of direct consumer warranties based in the United Kingdom. The brand advertises products such as new car warranty, and extended warranty.

== History ==
Extended warranties were the norm in North America, and were growing in popularity, at the time of the launch of Warranty Direct, in the summer of 1997, due in part to changes in the Sale of Goods Act, which was issued in December 1979. With the typical manufacturer's warranty lasting only three years, a large number of cars did not hold any form of extended mechanical, and electrical repair insurance.

Warranty Direct was founded by father and son, David McClure Fisher and Duncan McClure Fisher, in June 1997, its sole service was vehicle warranties, primarily for second hand cars and private sales, until 1999, when warranties for Household Appliance were launched.

David and Duncan McClure Fisher sold the majority stake in April 2008, and was sold to the arm of BNP Paribas Assurance, in the United Kingdom, Cardif Pinnacle, who purchased the remaining shares, in July 2013.

The company offers a range of services to people buying used cars.

In December 2020 Warranty Direct closed their website and business to new customers.

In January 2021 the brand was taken over by FirstBaseFM Ltd. a UK based Insurtech Company to develop and modernise the brand.

== Underwriters ==
Since the launch of Warranty Direct, underwriters have varied. Originally with Lloyd's of London, the majority of current policies are now underwritten by Cardif Pinnacle and administered by Warranty Direct.

Warranty Direct is regulated by the Financial Conduct Authority (FCA Register Number 309075) and as such, customers can seek help from the Financial Ombudsman Service (FOS) and Financial Services Compensation Scheme where necessary.

== Affiliated Websites ==
The Reliability Index has been running since April 2000. Data, from Warranty Direct’s paid claims, is used to establish the reliability of cars. This information is used to rank the car manufacturers and models, by reliability, and allocate the “Warranty Direct Rating”. The results are released in association with What Car?.

Potholes.co.uk allows the public to report potholes, and highlights problem areas, to local authorities.
