= Joseph Ramey de Sugny =

French rear admiral

Joseph de Ramey (comte de Sugny)
- Born: Marie Gabriel Joseph de Ramey; 15 February 1856; Paris, France
- Died: 17 August 1928 (aged 72); Paris, France
- Education: Prytanée National Militaire
- Occupations: Naval officer Naval attaché Admiral
- Spouse(s): 1887: Élisabeth de Montaigne de Poncins (1865-1898); 1902: Adèle Marie Catherine Renouard de Bussière (1867-1910)
- Children: 1889: Henry; 1895: Isabelle; 1904: Georgina; 1910: Jean Léopold

Joseph de Ramey de Sugny (after his father's death, the Count of Sugny) (15 February 1856 - 17 August 1928) was a French rear admiral (contre-amiral).

== Life ==
Marie Gabriel Joseph de Ramey was born in Paris. His father was Marie "Jacques" Henri de Ramey, the Viscount of Sugny (after the death of his elder brother, the Count of Sugny). Joseph's uncle was the politician Francisque-Joseph Ramey, the Count of Sugny (1825–1908). His mother, born Marie Louise "Isabelle" Le Bègue, was the daughter of the banker-politician Charles Le Bègue de Germiny (1799–1871). Both of Joseph's own marriages would be to women from well placed families.

He joined the navy at Toulon in 1873. He studied at the Prytanée National military academy and at the French Naval Academy. De Ramey was appointed a Midshipman Class 2 in August 1875 and embarked on his first posting, aboard the frigate Renomée. Promoted to midshipman class 1 in 1876, he was assigned to the cruiser Thémis, part of the South Atlantic naval division. In January 1879 he was promoted to ship's ensign.

He was assigned a position as an instruction on the training frigate Résolue and contributed to the production of a naval officer's manual ("Le Carnet de l'officier de marine"). He was sent to work with the naval maps and charts service ("Dépôt des cartes et plans de la Marine").

He became a lieutenant in March 1884, serving on the cruiser Infernet in the South Atlantic naval division, and from January 1886 as adjutant to the divisional commander, Captain Jules de Cuverville. He took the opportunity to collect information on astronomy and hydrography. He served as officer of ship-handling ("de manœuvre") and of look-out ("des montres") on the cruiser Clorinde, part of the Newfoundland naval division before obtaining his own command in 1888 when he succeeded Captain Humann on the cruiser La Clochetterie.

In the meantime, he became a knight of the Légion d'Honneur on 19 December 1886. His hydrographical researches also led to his being attached to the Naval Hydrographic Service ("Service hydrographique et océanographique de la Marine" / SHOM).

In February 1889 de Ramey was seconded to the Navy Ministry. He represented the minister at the International Meteorological Congress held in Paris during the 1889 World Fair.

In 1891 he was given command of the aviso Actif and then of the torpedo-aviso Couleuvrine, stationed at Algiers for port and fisheries surveillance. He was then appointed aide de camp to Admiral Sallandrouze de Lamornaix on the cruiser Naïade. He himself was promoted to the rank of frigate captain in 1896. He was appointed to the Gunnery School at the military port of Toulon where he was based for the next few years. In March 1900 he was given command of the armored cruiser D'Estrées with effect from January 1901.

In November 1901 he was appointed to a land job as the French naval attaché to Berlin where he maintained excellent relations with the German naval establishment and with the German emperor himself. De Ramey stayed in his Berlin posting until 1906. During this period, on 23 June 1903, he was promoted to the rank of vaisseau captain ("capitaine de vaisseau").

On returning from Berlin, de Ramey held a succession of commands, starting with the recently built armored cruiser Léon Gambetta in April 1906. In February 1907 he switched from the Northern squadron to the Mediterranean squadron when he took on the armored cruiser Jeanne d'Arc, with which he participated in the Moroccan campaign. He took command of the armored cruiser Gloire in April 1908 and of the armored cruiser Suffren in January 1909.

He was promoted to the rank of rear admiral (contre-amiral) on 14 May 1911, also appointed naval chief of staff and sea-front commander for Toulon. Three years later, when war broke out, he was given a senior command that included naval patrols of the Adriatic. On 13 July 1915, half a year short of his sixtieth birthday, he became a commander of the Légion d'Honneur. He became a grand officer of the Légion d'Honneur on 19 July 1921.

Joseph de Ramey, the Count of Sugny, transferred to the naval reserve on 1 January 1917.
