= Cardif =

French insurance company

- Trade name: BNP Paribas Cardif
- Type: Private
- Industry: Financial services (insurance)
- Founded: 1973
- Headquarters: Nanterre, France
- Areas served: France, Netherlands, United Kingdom, 30 other countries
- Revenue: 40.5 billion euros (2025)
- Number of employees: 8,000 (2022)
- Parent: BNP Paribas Group
- Website: bnpparibascardif.com/en/

Cardif is an international insurance company based in France with a presence worldwide. The company is part of the BNP Paribas Group.

== History ==
In 1973 the Compagnie Bancaire founded a life insurance company Compagnie d'Assurance et d'Investissement de France (CARDIF). Since 1998 the company is part of the BNP Paribas Group. In 2022, Cardif’s global operations had a workforce of about 8,000 and a presence in 33 countries.

=== 2014-16 ===
On 7 April 2014 BNP Paribas Cardif was sanctioned and fined 10 million euros by the disciplinary committee of the "Authority of prudential supervision and resolution" (ACPR - Bank of France) for shortcomings and delays in complying with its legal obligations and which resulted in wrongful retention of amounts that should have been paid to beneficiaries of unclaimed life insurance policies (origin, Le Particulier No. 1097).

In 2015, BNP Paribas Cardif was planning on upping its stake in SBI Life in India to 36 percent, up from 26 percent.

=== 2017-19 ===
In 2017, BNP Paribas Cardif purchased Ageas' Italian insurance unit (Cargeas Assicurazioni).

BNP Paribas Cardif in 2018 had agreed to purchase a partial stake to SBI Life Insurance, after co-founding the joint venture with the State Bank of India in 2001 and already owning 22 percent. BNP Paribas Cardif SA then sold 9 percent of SBI Life Insurance to Carlyle Group in 2019. After another sale later that month, that left BNP Paribas Cardiff's stake in SBI Life Insurance at 7.7 percent, down from 12.7 percent.

=== 2020-21 ===
In 2020, Cardif aimed to invest €3.5 billion in green investments, up from 2017, when it had "pledged to reach €2.4 billion in green investments" before 2019. It also reduced its investments in coal companies.

The insurance company, specifically the BNP Paribas subsidiary Cardif Pinnacle, in July 2020 was censured by the U.K. Competition and Markets Authority for breaches of PPI rules, along with Lloyds Bank and Nationwide.

Cardif was in talks in May 2020 to buy a stake in the life insurer of PT Bank Rakyat Indonesia, after submitting the highest bid for PT Asuransi BRI Life. The sale was reported to be for around $500 million.

=== 2025 ===
In July 2025, Cardif acquires Axa Investment Managers, an investment subsidiary of AXA, an insurance and reinsurance company.

== Cardif Netherlands ==
Cardif has been active in the Dutch market since 1996. In 2000, the Dutch headquarters moved from Breda to Oosterhout, currently employing 120 people. More than 600,000 Dutch people have Cardif insurance. Cardif specialises in life insurance and insurance that protects people’s personal situations. In the Netherlands, Cardif is the market leader in mortgage protection. Cardif’s insurance products are sold by independent financial advisors and banks.

== Cardif Pinnacle (UK) ==
Cardif Pinnacle is a UK subsidiary of Cardif, The business was formed in 1971 as Pinnacle Insurance Company Ltd, and is focused upon the provision of creditor, pet insurance and motor warranty insurance. The strategy of the business is to ensure that customers are well serviced whilst focusing on the operational capabilities and efficiency. The business is making ongoing investment into its pet and warranty propositions. Cardif Pinnacle group owns a motor warranty business, Warranty Direct Ltd which arranges warranty and Gap insurance both direct to consumers and via intermediaries. They also own two pet insurance brands helpucover since 2000 and Everypaw since 2017.

== Joint ventures ==
- BOB-Cardif Life (joint venture with Bank of Beijing)
- BNP Paribas Cardif Life Korea (joint venture between BNP Paribas Cardif and Shinhan Financial Group)

== See also ==
- Compagnie Bancaire
- List of insurance companies
