= André Lévy-Lang =

French private banker (1937–2026)

- Born: 26 November 1937; Alexandria, Egypt
- Died: 8 August 2026 (aged 88)
- Education: École polytechnique Stanford University (DBA)
- Occupation: Private banker

André Lévy-Lang (French: [ɑ̃dʁˈe lˈe͡ɪvi-lˈɑ̃ɡ]; 26 November 1937 – 8 August 2026) was a French private banker.

A graduate of the École polytechnique and Stanford University, he served as chairman of the board of directors of the Compagnie Bancaire and subsequently of BNP Paribas. He was a member of the think tank Le Siècle and a member of the steering committee of the Bilderberg Meeting.

Lévy-Lang died on 8 August 2026, at the age of 88.

== Works ==
- L'Argent, la Finance et le Risque (2006)
- Il faut maîtriser la Finance (2012)
- La Révolution de la finance : acte II (2019)
