= Charles-Grégoire de Beauchamps =

French military general and politician (1731–1817)

Charles-Grégoire, Marquis of Beauchamps
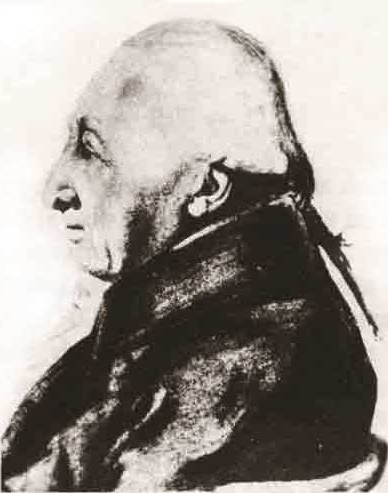
- Born: 25 July 1731; Cherbonnières, France
- Died: 5 May 1817 (aged 85); Paris, France
- Occupation: Military officer
- Known for: Delegate to the Estates-General of 1789 (Second Estate)
- Spouses: 1. Marie Anne Jeanne Françoise van Buel (1761); 2. Louise-Hélène de Rosen (ca. 1785)
- Children: 1

Charles-Grégoire, the Marquis of Beauchamps (25 July 1731 – 5 May 1817) was a French military general and politician. During the run up to the French Revolution, he sat as a Second Estate member of the Estates-General in the summer of 1789.

== Life ==
Charles-Grégoire was born and baptised at Cherbonnières, roughly 19 km (13 miles) to the east of Saint-Jean-d'Angély, between Poitiers and Bordeaux in rural western France. He was a younger son of Henri-Charles de Beauchamps (1701-1777), lord of the manor at Cherbonnières. His mother, Madeleine-Dorothée de Lescours, was probably also of aristocratic provenance. He embarked on his military career late in 1757 when he took part in the disastrous (for France) Battle of Rossbach, receiving but surviving fourteen injuries, and retaining his "colours", albeit in a badly shredded condition. He was awarded the Cross of St Louis for his valour and progressed with a military career that took him, eventually, to the rank of a Maréchal de camp.

In April 1789, with the government in financial crisis, the Estates General was summoned for the first time since 1614 in order to come up with ideas for solving the government's cash shortage. As matters turned out, delegates arrived with their own agendas and the French Revolution broke out a couple of months later. The parliament was divided into three classes (estates): Church, Nobility and Commoners. The Marquis of Beauchamps, by now a cavalry colonel, had been elected in March to the Second Estate and proved a passionate supporter of the threatened Ancien Régime. Mindful that his skills were better suited to fighting with a sword than with words, he persuaded his friend Michel-Louis-Étienne Regnaud de Saint-Jean d'Angély to present a powerful protest on his behalf against the actions of the States General, which d'Angély duly did, even though Beauchamps's conservative views were contrary to his own position.

The early years of the French Revolution found the Marquis of Beauchamps on the wrong side of events, and he emigrated to Liège where he had property and family connections. His wife was the sister of one mayor of that city and had been the widow of another. However, as the Revolutionary Army rolled across into what later became Belgium his estates in Liège were confiscated and he was driven into a remoter exile, staying with the Duke of Brunswick who was another (more distant) relative. By 1802 much of the earlier revolutionary savagery had been diverted into a more conventional war of territorial conquest and he had been able to return home, greatly impoverished but alive.

At the start of 1802 he was still banned from France, and Beauchamps again requested a favour of his former neighbour and friend, Michel-Louis-Étienne Regnaud de Saint-Jean d'Angély, who by now held a senior government position and was on excellent terms with the First Consul. Initially, however, d'Angély reported that he had been unable to have Beauchamps' name removed from the banned list, because of information found in police files. Beauchamps quickly expressed his conviction that his name must be on the police list because of the passionate protest which d'Angély had himself composed on his behalf thirteen years earlier, against the actions of the States General. Regardless of whether or not this was indeed the cause of the problem, by the end of 1802 d'Angély had succeeded in getting the ban on Charles-Grégoire de Beauchamps lifted.

With the Bourbon Restoration in 1814, the Marquis of Beauchamps lost no time in rediscovering his enthusiasm for the monarchy, and early in 1815, before Napoleon's brief return to France, the 84 year old Charles-Grégoire de Beauchamps had written a letter of eye-watering but presumably appropriate obsequiousness to the relatively youthful the king. He was promoted to Maréchal de camp on 29 February 1816 and died fifteen months later. Sources differ as to whether he died at his Paris home at Rue St-André-des-Arts 55, or at Saint-Jean-d'Angély, close to his birthplace in rural western France. It was in any event at Saint-Jean-d'Angély that his body was buried.

== Personal ==
Charles-Grégoire de Beauchamps married his first wife, Marie Anne Jeanne Françoise van Buel, (1710-1778) on 7 June 1761 in Liège, at that time in the Austrian Netherlands. She came from a leading family in the city. His second marriage, which took place around 1785, was to Louise-Hélène de Rosen, (ca. 1749-1789) who came from another leading Liege family.

Outside his marriage he had a daughter with Ferdinande de Horion, the young third wife of Maximiliaan of Arberg (and a niece of François-Charles de Velbrück). His paternity was freely acknowledged by all concerned and the girl, known as Catherine de Saintes, later went on to marry Antoine-Augustin Renouard and become the matriarch of a prominent Parisian dynasty.
