= Eugène Goüin =

French banker and politician

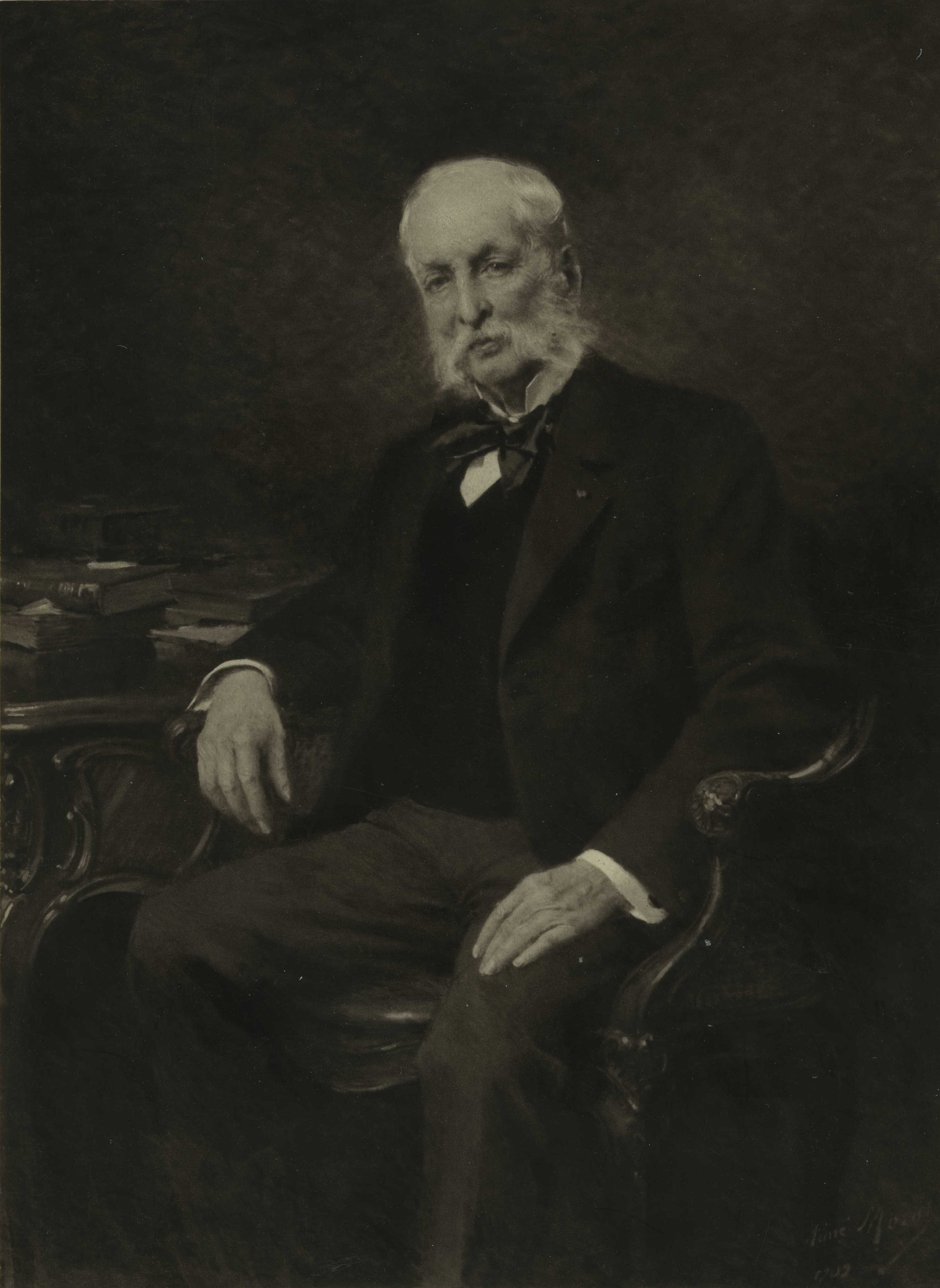

Sénateur inamovible
- In office 1875–1909

Deputy for Indre-et-Loire
- In office 1871–1875

Mayor of Tours
- In office 1866–1875

Eugène Goüin (1818 – 1909) was a Parisian banker and politician.

== Life ==
Son of the minister Alexandre Goüin, he was member of the municipal council of Tours from 1848 and president of the Tribunal (1856–1879) and Chamber of Commerce (1858–1879) of Tours.

He was mayor of Tours (1866–1875), deputy for the department of Indre-et-Loire (1871–1875) and sénateur inamovible (1875–1909).

Goüin has founder and chairman of Banque de Paris et des Pays-Bas (1895–1909), chairman of the Supervisory committee of Caisse des dépôts et consignations (1888–1909), vice chairman of Chemins de fer de Paris à Lyon et à la Méditerranée, member of the board of Caisse d'Epargne, Banque de l'Indochine, ...

== See also ==
- Hôtel Goüin
