= General Mediterranean Holding =

Coordinates: 49°36′52″N 6°7′39″E

- Type: Conglomerate
- Industry: Finance, real estate, construction, industry, and information technology
- Founded: 1979; 47 years ago
- Founder: Nadhmi Auchi
- Headquarters: Luxembourg City, Luxembourg
- Website: gmhsa.com

The General Mediterranean Holding (GMH) is a Luxembourg financial holding company that was founded by Anglo-Iraqi businessman Nadhmi Auchi.

GMH is a diverse business group with activities in Banking & Finance, Real Estate & Construction, Hotel & Leisure, Industrial, Trading & Pharmaceuticals, Communications & IT and Aviation.

Its interests span across the Mediterranean and beyond with over 120 companies employing some 11,000 staff with representation in the Middle East, Northern Africa, Europe, the Americas, the Caribbean, the Asia Sub Continent and the Pacific Rim. The Group's consolidated assets now exceed €2 billion.

== History ==
The company was established in 1979 in Luxembourg by Anglo-Iraqi businessman Nadhmi Auchi.

=== Corruption scandal ===
In 2003 April, GMH’s 100% owner Nadhmi Auchi was arrested on three counts of conspiracy to defraud in connection with a £26m corruption scandal involving French oil firm TotalFinaElf. Auchi was later convicted of fraud and given a15-month suspended jail sentence and GMH ordered to pay USD2.8 million fine.

=== Accusation of co-conspiration in chemical weapons attack ===
In March 2018, GMH and its owner Nadhmi Auchi were sued on behalf of survivors of the Saddam Hussein regime’s 1988 chemical weapons attack in Halabja in Iraqi Kuristan. The complaint alleges that GMH and Auchi is a co-conspirator in the March 16, 1988 chemical attack that killed over 5,000 civilians and injured more than 10,000 Kurds.

=== GMH defrauding American businessman Serin Sirazi ===
In June 2016, a US federal court ordered GMH and its owner Nadhmi Auchi to pay Mr. Sirazi $12.9 million for compensatory damages. The court also ordered GMH to pay punitive damages of $5 million for theft.
