= Alexandre-Joseph Desenne =

French artist

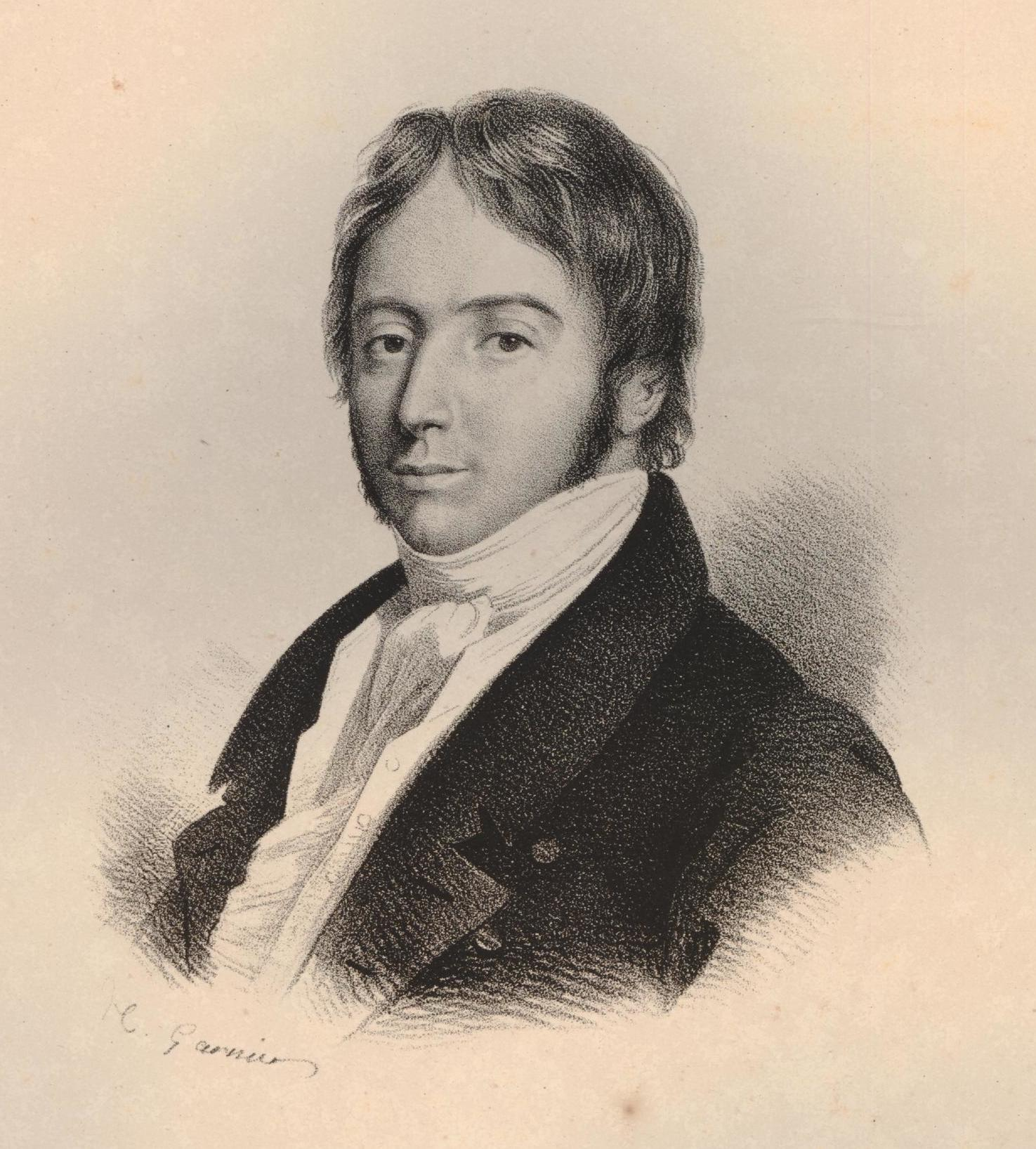
Portrait of Alexandre-Joseph Desenne

Alexandre-Joseph Desenne (1785–1827) was a French artist. Son of a bookseller, he devoted himself to producing drawings for vignettes for the finest editions of the French classics - Nicolas Boileau, Jean Racine, Molière, Jean-Jacques Rousseau, Voltaire, etc.
