= Cherbonnières =

- Commune
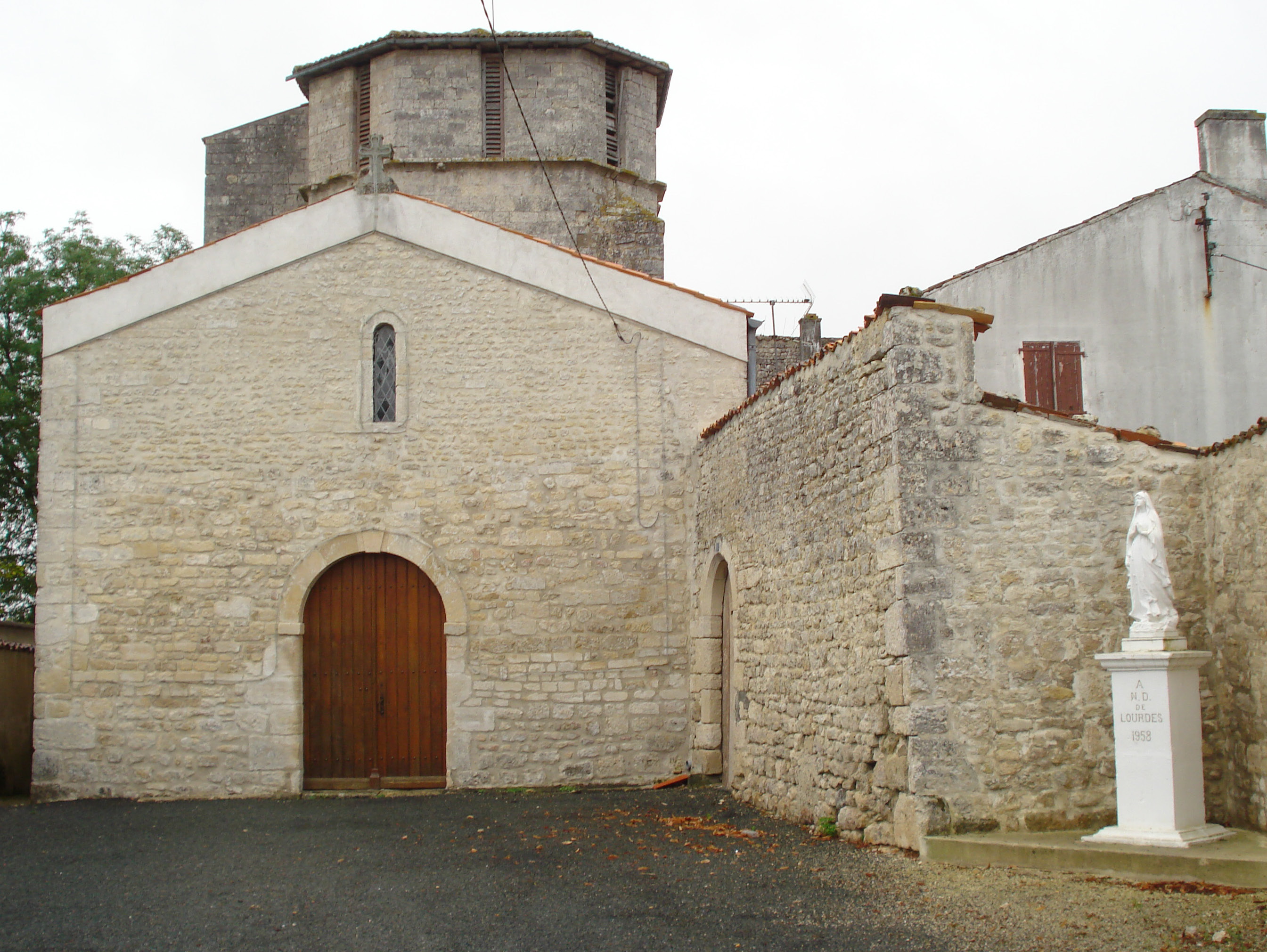
- The church in Cherbonnières
- Location of Cherbonnières
- Location within France Location within Nouvelle-Aquitaine
- Coordinates: 45°57′48″N 0°20′16″W
- Country: France
- Region: Nouvelle-Aquitaine
- Department: Charente-Maritime
- Arrondissement: Saint-Jean-d'Angély
- Canton: Matha
- Intercommunality: Vals de Saintonge

Government
  - Mayor (2020–2026): Marie-Claude Giovannini
- Area^{1}: 16.58 km^{2} (6.40 sq mi)
- Highest elevation: 94 m (308 ft)
- Lowest elevation: 44 m (144 ft)
- Population (2023): 347
  - Density: 20.9/km^{2} (54.2/sq mi)
- Time zone: UTC+01:00 (CET)
  - Summer (DST): UTC+02:00 (CEST)
- INSEE/Postal code: 17101 /17470
- ^{1} French Land Register data, which excludes lakes, ponds, glaciers > 1 km^{2} (0.386 sq mi or 247 acres) and river estuaries.

Cherbonnières (French pronunciation: [ʃɛʁbɔnjɛʁ]) is a commune in the Charente-Maritime department in southwestern France.

== Population ==
Historical population
Year	Pop.	±% p.a.
1968	472	—
1975	440	−1.00%
1982	388	−1.78%
1990	375	−0.43%
1999	349	−0.80%
2007	339	−0.36%
2012	345	+0.35%
2017	338	−0.41%
2023	347	+0.44%
Source: INSEE

== See also ==
- Communes of the Charente-Maritime department
