= Francisque-Joseph Ramey de Sugny =

French politician

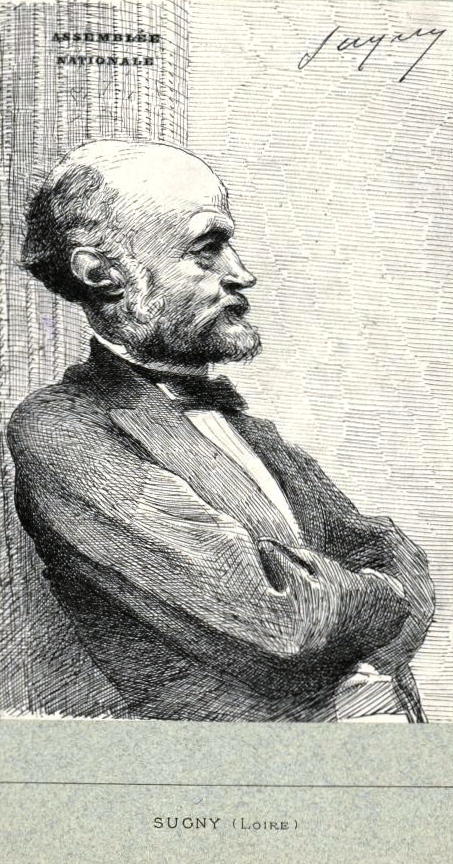

Francisque-Marie-Joseph Ramey, the Count of Sugny (14 September 1825 – 1 July 1908) was a French politician. In February 1871 he was elected to the post-defeat National Assembly where he supported the Legitimist faction. Subsequently, he stood on three successive occasions for election to the Senate (upper house), but without success.

== Biography ==
Francisque-Marie-Joseph Ramey was born in the Château de la Bastie d'Urfé at Saint-Étienne-le-Molard, in the Loire department. He came from a political family. His grandfather, Marie-Jean-Baptiste-Antoine Ramey de Sugny, had been briefly imprisoned during the Terror, but had survived long enough to be released following the fall of Robespierre.

Francisque-Marie-Joseph Ramey de Sugny was elected to the National Assembly on 8 February 1871, representing his natal department in the legislature. Reflecting the rural traditionalism of his region, he belonged to the catholic monarchist faction in the chamber, backing the restoration of a monarchy and the dismissal of the republican President Thiers, and opposing the Constitutional Laws which established the Third Republic and the Wallon amendment.

He was also Conseiller général of the Canton of Saint-Just-en-Chevalet between 1852 and 1880, and then again between 1887 and 1904. Between 1880 and 1887 the position was held by a republican. His term in the National Assembly ended in 1876 and in the election of 30 January 1876 he was a candidate for the department, but he lost out narrowly to another (moderate) republican, Lucien Arbel. The constitutional crisis of May 1877 triggered another general election. Ramey de Sugny was a candidate again, but again without success. The margin of his defeat at his third attempt to gain election to the Senate, in 1879, was greater still.
