= Albert Ricot =

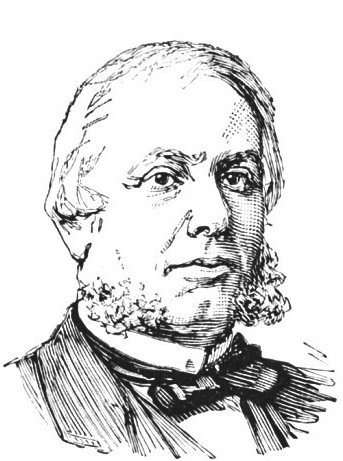
Albert Ricot Portrait

Albert-Augustin Ricot (5 May 1826 - 23 February 1902) was a French civil engineer who became a forge master and then an independently minded politician of the centre-right.

Albert was born in Paris, the third recorded child of Jean François Emmanuel Constant Ricot (1783-1839) by his marriage to Marie Eugénie Renouard (1795-1871). Jean was a ship owner based in Saint-Valery-sur-Somme, a prosperous trading and fishing port to the north of Paris.

After spending his childhood in Picardy Albert enrolled at the prestigious School of Bridges and Roads ("École Nationale des Ponts et Chaussées" / ENPC) in Paris, and emerged qualified for work as a public civil engineer. He was sent to work in the Vosges region around and to the south of Épinal. His more noteworthy projects included the Bussang Tunnel and the 18 km / 11 miles of road lined with plane trees which subsequently enabled the emperor Napoleon III and his substantial entourages to travel rapidly and safely from the little railway station at Aillevillers to the health resort of Plombières-les-Bains where, famously, in 1858 the emperor secretly negotiated a political and diplomatic route to Italian unification with Count Cavour, the first minister of Piedmont-Sardinia.

In nearby Épinal Albert Ricot met the talented young architect Léon Grillot, the designer of the church at Plombières and later, at the request of the empress, of the chapel at Varigney. It was at Varigney that the two friends married the two daughters of Jérôme-Auguste Patret. Albert married Mélanie Pauline Nelly Patret on 6 June 1854 in a double wedding at which Léon Grillot married her younger sister, Marie.

Varigney, set in the hills between Épinal and Vesoul, had been a centre of iron production since the sixteenth century, originally under the direction of the local monastery and more recently controlled by Jérôme-Auguste Patret. In 1860 Ricot resigned from his work as a civil engineer in order to prepare to take over his father-in-law's factory. He duly took control in 1862 or 1863 which was the year in which his father-in-law died. In 1863 the factory included a blast furnace including a cupola in a spacious building, a blowing machine that had replaced a piston based system, two hydraulic machines each delivering 13 horse power and a six horse power steam engine. By taking over his father-in-law's business Albert Ricot had become a significant forge master.

In 1863 he was elected Conseiller général representing the canton of Vauvillers. He devoted himself to the public good with energy, accepting an appointment by the ministry as a Member of the Departmental Council for Public Instruction.In June 1866 he was appointed a member of the Departmental Council for Public Works. In October 1866 the Ministry for Public Instruction appointed him to a council set up to improve standards at the Imperial Lycée at Vesoul and in December 1867 he was appointed to an equivalent council in respect of the Lycée at Luxeuil, Further practical appointments followed, while he retained his seat as Conseiller général till 1880.

Under the Third Republic he also entered national politics, elected on 8 February 1871 to the National Assembly where he represented the Haute-Saône Department as a member of the Orléanist parliamentary group, Centre droit. He was re-elected on 20 February 1876 and supported the short-lived Broglie government. He was again elected in October 1877, but after that election was invalidated retrospectively by the new parliament in January 1878 he resigned his seat for good.

Albert Ricot died at Dampierre-lès-Conflans near Varigney on 23 February 1902.
