= Compagnie Bancaire =

Former French bank

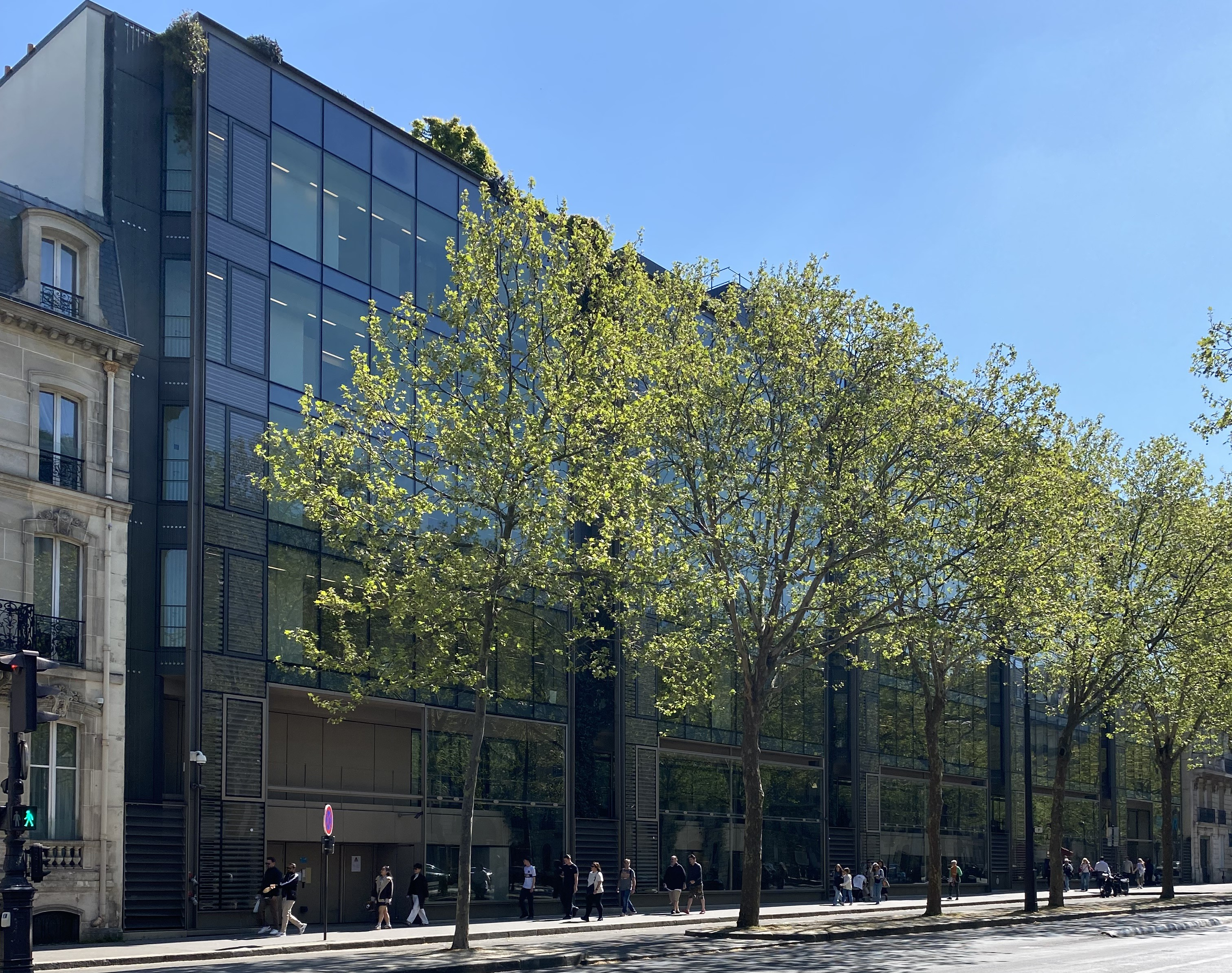
- Former head office building of the Compagnie Bancaire at 5, avenue Kléber in Paris, later repurposed for SCOR SE
- Company type: Private company
- Industry: Financial services
- Founded: 1946
- Founder: Jacques de Fouchier
- Defunct: May 12, 1998
- Fate: Acquired
- Successor: BNP Paribas
- Headquarters: Paris, France
- Area served: France
- Products: Guarantees, loans
- Services: Export credit agency

The Compagnie Bancaire (lit. 'Banking Company') was a French bank, formed from 1946 onwards by successive ventures and acquisitions led by former civil servant Jacques de Fouchier. It innovated in retail financial services such as consumer credit. It came under the control of Paribas in the late 1960s and was eventually acquired by it in 1998, subsequently becoming part of BNP Paribas.

== History ==
=== Union Financière d'Entreprises Françaises et Étrangères ===
In September 1946, Fouchier left his senior civil servant position at the Direction du Trésor to create the Union Financière d'Entreprises Françaises et Étrangères (UFEFE, lit. 'Financial Union of French and Foreign Companies'). UFEFE provided short-term credit to finance imports of raw materials into France by exporting industries, which repaid the credits from their export revenue. The UFEFE's business model gained momentum thanks to the Marshall Plan in the late 1940s.

In 1949, Fouchier acquired the Banque Française d'Acceptation (lit. 'French Acceptance Bank') and merged it with UFEFE. The Banque Française d'Acceptation, whose name referred to banker's acceptances, had been established jointly by several French banks in 1929, including the Banque de Paris et des Pays-Bas, the Banque de l'Union Parisienne, and the Banque Nationale de Crédit.

=== Union Française des Banques ===
The merged UFEFE-BFA entity renamed in 1950 as Union Française des Banques (UFB, lit. 'French Union of Banks'). As a result of the merger, the UFB included Banque Worms, the Crédit du Nord, Union des Mines, Crédit Lyonnais, Société Générale, Banque de Paris et des Pays-Bas and Banque de l'Indochine among its shareholders.

From that platform, Fouchier proceeded with the establishment of specialized ventures in emerging segments of the French financial services market:

- In 1951, the Union de Crédit pour le Bâtiment (UCB, lit. 'Building Credit Union'), a residential mortgage credit company formed in partnership with the Crédit Foncier de France;
- In 1953, the Crédit à l'équipement électro-ménager (lit. 'Appliance Equipment Credit', abbreviated as Cetelem), a consumer credit firm intended to serve French households that were then starting to purchase domestic appliances in large numbers;
- In 1954, the Compagnie Française d’Épargne et de Crédit (CFEC, lit. 'French Compagny for Savings and Credit')), a long-term mortgage credit formed in partnership with the Fédération du Bâtiment et des compagnies d'assurance;
- In 1956, the Société d'Études et de Gestion des Centres d’Équipement (Ségécé, lit. 'Company for Research and Management of Equipment Centers'), in partnership with the Fédération parisienne du Bâtiment et des banques for the management of property assets such as shopping malls.

=== Compagnie Bancaire ===
In July 1959, the Union Française des Banques was reorganized and renamed as Compagnie Bancaire, a joint holding of the four specialized entities. It was floated on the Paris Stock Exchange in 1961. In the later 1960s, Paribas became the Compagnie Bancaire's main shareholder, and in turn the Compagnie Bancaire became a significant shareholder of Paribas.

In 1970, the Compagnie Bancaire took over the Compagnie pour le Financement de l'Industrie du Commerce et de l'Agriculture (COFICA, lit. 'Company for the Financing of Industry, Commerce and Agriculture', est. 1945), which made loans for the purchase of cars, trucks, and agricultural vehicles.

In July 1973, it established a life insurance company branded Cardif (for Compagnie d'Assurance et d'Investissement de France, lit. 'French Insurance and Investment Company') which met major commercial success and was floated on the Paris Stock Exchange in 1990.

In 1984, it established Cortal, a retail brokerage. In 1994, Cortal developed its product offering by providing a wide choice of mutual funds from multiple providers, a first in Continental Europe.

Following the election of François Mitterrand in 1981, the Compagnie Bancaire escaped nationalization, unlike its shareholder Paribas which was nationalized on 12 February 1982. In 1985, Cetelem acquired Findomestic in Italy and subsequently expanded further into Portugal, the United Kingdom, and Germany. Cortal was granted a banking license and pioneered the concept of bank without physical branches. In 1989, Arval developed long-term leasing and fleet management services for corporate clients. By the 1990s, the contribution from the Compagnie Bancaire represented nearly a fifth of Paribas's overall profits.

=== Absorption by Paribas ===
Shortly after Jacques de Fouchier's death on 11 March 1997, Paribas launched a public offering for Compagnie Bancaire in December of that year. The merger was approved by general meeting of 12 May 1998.

== See also ==
- Consumer credit
- List of banks in France
