= Emmanuel Monick =

Emmanuel Monick (January 10, 1893, in Le Mans, France – December 23, 1983?) was a French politician and banker. He was appointed Governor of the Banque de France during the liberation of France at the end of World War II, replacing Yves Bréart de Boisanger, Inspector of Finance in Vichy France.

As the Secretary General of Finance in the Provisional Government of the French Republic from August 29 to September 4, 1944, he had to decide what to do about the gold that the Nazi Party requisitioned from the National Bank of Belgium following the Second Armistice at Compiègne in 1940, which they later sold to the Swiss National Bank.

The 220 tonnes of gold were repaid to the National Bank of Belgium at the end of 1944 from the Banque de France's own reserves. Monick negotiated the recovery for the Banque de France of 90 tonnes of gold and 250 million Swiss francs.

== Biography ==
As a result of his participation in World War I, Monick was awarded the Legion of Honour and the Croix de Guerre with five palms and two stars.

After World War I, he was a financial attaché at the French embassy in Washington, where he became great friends with French Ambassador Paul Claudel and met Franklin D. Roosevelt. Later appointed as a financial attaché to London, he met Winston Churchill.

During World War II, Emmanuel Monick was the Secretary General of the French protectorate of Morocco. He helped prepare for Operation Torch, which landed U.S. troops in North Africa, along with Consul General Robert Murphy and Chargé d'affaires J. Rives Childs. His position meant that he was able to smuggle people out of the country and save the lives of several Jews by helping them reach the United States.

Michel Debré was his chief of staff during this period, and Robert Marjolin was his senior political advisor. The Vichy government realized that he did not support its agenda of collaboration and recalled him to France with an order sent by cable from Otto Abetz and requested by Joachim von Ribbentrop.

Once back in France, he went underground, hiding in Ain and then in Paris, going by his resistance alias "Bruère". He participated in many resistance activities, with Michel Debré in particular, and attended the August 25, 1944, meeting of the Provisory Council of the Republic at the Hôtel Matignon which set up the government that would succeed Maréchal Pétain. Monick helped liberate the Ministry of Finance at the request of Alexandre Parodi. He became the Secretary General of Finance in the government that took power from Vichy.

Citing policy differences with the government, he left his post as Governor of the Bank of France in 1949, which caused some concern in the markets. Monick became President of the Bank of Paris and the Netherlands (which later became BNP Paribas) and later Honorary President of the same bank.

When Charles de Gaulle began to question the future of French institutions, he asked Emmanuel Molnick to arrange a secret meeting with the Count of Paris. It took place on July 13, 1954, at Monick's home in Saint-Léger-en-Yvelines. In an interview with Point de Vue's Image du Monde on the Count's 80th birthday, the Countess of Paris said that this was the first time the two met. The count gives his account of the meeting in Dialogue sur la France, Fayard, 1994.

During the summer of 1956, Monick also arranged several discreet meetings between de Gaulle and foreign heads of state, such as Mohammed V of Morocco, or political figures, such as French President René Coty.

Until the end of his life, Emmanuel Monick was influential, respected, and consulted by many in the business and political worlds.

== Works ==
- Tomorrow peace (Demain la paix) (with Michel Debré), Paris, Editions Plon, 1945
- For the record (Pour mémoire), Paris, Editions Mesnil, 1970
- Remaking of France (Refaire la France), written in secret with Michel Debré under their resistance aliases Jacquier (Debré) and Bruere (Monick), Paris, Plon 1945: They first sketched the institutional architecture of the French Fifth Republic in this work.
