= Nadhmi Auchi =

British-Iraqi businessman

- Born: Nadhmi Shakir Auchi; 11 June 1937 (age 89); Baghdad, Iraq
- Education: Baghdad College High School; Al-Mustansiriya University
- Occupation: Businessman
- Years active: 1957–present
- Spouse: Ibtisam Auchi
- Children: 4

Nadhmi Shakir Auchi, KSS (Arabic: نظمي أوجي; born 11 June 1937) is a British-Iraqi businessman and billionaire, founding president of the Anglo Arab Organisation, and the founder and chairman of General Mediterranean Holding (GMH), a conglomerate of 120 companies worldwide.

According to The Sunday Times Rich List in 2023, Auchi is worth £1.182 billion.

== Personal life ==
Born in the Karadat Mariam area of Baghdad, Iraq, in 1937 to an Assyrian family of the Chaldean Catholic Church, Auchi attended Al Mansoor Primary School and Baghdad College High School, before going on to study at Baghdad's Mustansiriyah University. He married his wife Ibtisam in 1963, and together they have 3 daughters and 1 son, born in 1964 and 1972 respectively. In 1979, he and his family fled to London following an extortion attempt by an enforcer for Barzan Ibrahim al-Tikriti. Six years later, Auchi's younger brother Naseer was hanged by the Baathist regime after discovering the extent of al-Tikriti's corruption. Auchi became a British citizen in 1989 and currently resides in London.

== Education and career ==
Auchi graduated with a B.Sc. in Economics and Political Science from Al-Mustansiriya University, Baghdad, in 1967. He also worked with the Iraqi Ministry of Oil, becoming Director of Planning and Development in 1969. In 1979, he founded General Mediterranean Holding SA in Luxembourg. He was also vice chair of Harvard Kennedy School at Harvard University from 1996 and 2000.

He has been president of the Anglo Arab Organisation (AAO), since its founding in 2002. The AAO is a private non-profit making organisation, promoting the integration of British Arabs into mainstream British society, whilst retaining their identity. AAO's achievements include donating money to families affected by the earthquake in Pakistan in 2005, building a school in the earthquake-devastated town of Hoceima, Morocco and hosting a charity gala that collected £35,000 in donations to the benefit of the Cancer Research Unit of the Kingston Hospital in London. Auchi and AAO have also led and sponsored high-level delegations made up of Arab, British and French dignitaries, and religious and political figures pressing for the release of hostages in Baghdad, including securing the release of two French journalists, Christian Chesnot and Georges Malbrunot and their Syrian driver in 2004.

In 2007, Auchi, in collaboration with the American University in Cairo (AUC) announced the launch of the 'Nadhmi Auchi fellowship for young Arab leaders', a fellowship dedicated to the development of the abilities of Arab youth in institution management and leadership. Auchi pays the full study and living costs of ten students from Egypt and other Arab states. The fellowship plan was announced during an annual ceremony at the Egyptian Embassy in London to celebrate AUC achievements.

== Honours and awards ==
In 1996, the President of Tunisia, Zine El Abidine Ben Ali, made him an Officer of the Order of the Republic. In 2002, he was also awarded the Grand Cordon of the Order of Independence by King Abdullah II of Jordan.

In 2003, Auchi was made a Knight Grand Cross of the Royal Order of Francis I (GCFO) by Prince Carlo, Duke of Castro, this in recognition of his major contributions to inter-church and inter-faith dialogue. In England, the College of Arms approved his Coat of Arms in 2004. In the same year the president of the Republic of Lebanon, Émile Lahoud, awarded Auchi with the Membership First Grade of the Lebanese Order of Merit, having already appointed him as a Commander of the National Order of the Cedar in 2000. He was made a Knight of the Order of St. Sylvester (KSS) by Pope John Paul II in 2004.

In 2005 Auchi was made Grao-Mestre da Ordem do Merito Anhanguera in Brazil and was elected as an Honorary Member in the International College of Surgeons in Chicago, Illinois.

Auchi was awarded 'The Presidential Prize' in 2007 by the President of the American University in Cairo, in appreciation of his efforts in supporting higher education in the Arab World.

On 18 July 2013, he was awarded the Freedom of the City of London

On 13 November 2014, Auchi was appointed a Knight Commander of the Most Distinguished Order of the Nation (KCN) of Antigua and Barbuda. This knighthood was later removed by the Governor General of Antigua following accusations around the circumstances in which it was given.

== Controversies ==
In 2003, Auchi was convicted of fraud following his involvement in a $504 million corruption scandal centred on the French oil company Elf Aquitaine, described as "the biggest political and corporate sleaze scandal to hit a western democracy since the second world war". Auchi was given a $2.8 million fine, along with a 15-month suspended jail sentence, for his involvement in the 1991 purchase by Elf Aquitaine of various Spanish oil refineries and petrol stations, having been accused by prosecutors of funnelling $118 million of illegal commissions back to the Elf executives who had initially set up the deal.

Following the verdict, Elf (by now merged with TotalFina and renamed Total) decided to take legal action against Auchi in France; Auchi responded by suing Total for $327 million in turn, this time in the UK.

== See also ==
- Banque continentale du Luxembourg
