= Hello bank! =

European online bank

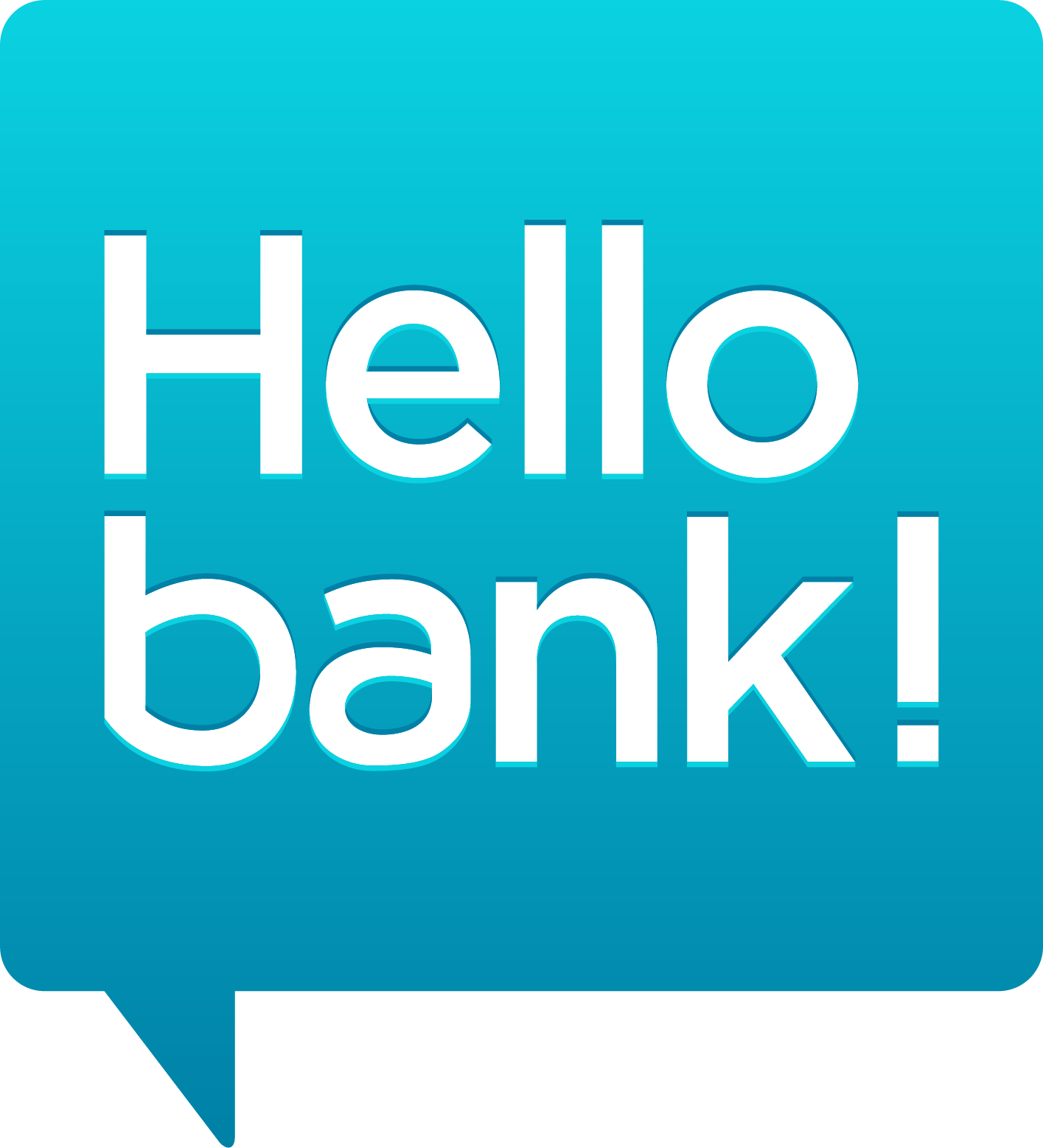
- Industry: Bank; Insurance
- Founded: 2013
- Headquarters: Paris
- Products: Credit cards; Mortgages Loans; Savings
- Parent: BNP Paribas
- Website: www.hellobank.com

Hello bank! is a digital direct bank owned by BNP Paribas that started operations in 2013. The bank operates in France, Belgium, Germany (using the name Consorsbank), Italy, the Czech Republic and Austria. BNP Paribas has claimed that it is "the first 100% digital mobile bank in Europe".

== History ==
The project was first discussed in 2012 and the bank was launched in Belgium and Germany on 16 May 2013, in France on 17 June 2013 and in Italy on 28 October 2013. On 13 February 2014 the bank announced that they had reached 177,000 customers at the end of 2013.

At the end of 2014 the customers in Germany, Belgium, France and Italy reached 791,000.

Hello bank! launched in Austria on 1 August 2015. At the end of 2015 the customers of Hello bank! in all 5 markets reached 2.4 million.

At the end of 2016 Hello bank! had 2.5 million customers across its 5 markets, with more than 1.5 million in Germany and 480 thousand in Belgium.

In May 2017 Czech BNP Paribas Personal Finance SA, o.z. announced re-branding. New brand Hello bank! has replaced Cetelem trademark. At the end of 2017 Hello bank! had 2.9 million customers across its 5 original markets (excluding the Czech Republic), with 350 thousand in France.

In July 2021 the Austrian Bank BAWAG P.S.K. acquired Hello Bank! Austria for 23 million Euro and renamed it May 2022 to "Easybank".

In March 2023 Czech branch of Hello Bank announced that it cease all activities in Czech Republic and will withdraw from the country. All offices was closed in less than a month. In April 2023 Hello bank had only one functioning office in Prague, Czech Republic. Later on in early May 2023 all Czech clients of Hello Bank was informed by e-mail for upcoming closing of their accounts by July 2023.

== Activities ==
Hello bank! offers the following products and services:

- Banking
- Brokerage
- Insurance
- Loans
- Savings

The bank is supported through different BNP Paribas retail banking subsidiaries where they exist; these are: BNP Paribas in France, BNL in Italy, BNP Paribas Fortis in Belgium. BNP Paribas, BNL and BNP Paribas Fortis branches can be used to deposit checks or to withdraw money in these countries.

In Austria, Hello bank! operates its own network of branches.

In Belgium Hello bank! was one of the first three banks (along with BNP Paribas Fortis) to launch Google Pay in the country.

In Germany the local subsidiary of Hello bank! uses the brand name Consorsbank, but the logo and the brand colors are very similar to those used in the rest of the markets. In November 2016 it absorbed DAB Bank that BNP Paribas had acquired in 2014, with all customer accounts being transferred to Consorsbank.
