= Cortal Consors =

European investing and trading broker

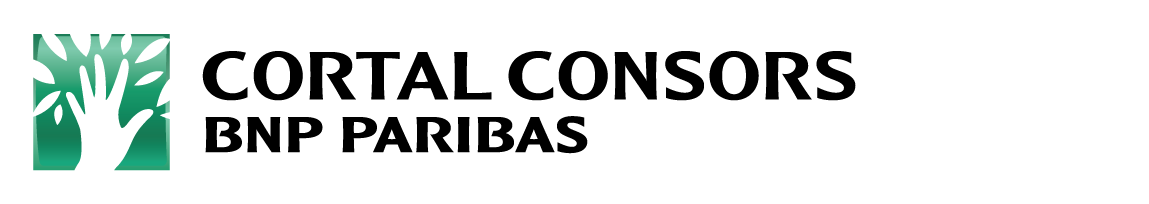

Cortal Consors SA was a European broker in personal investing and online trading.

Formed by a merger of French company Cortal and German company Consors, they launched a 2003 rebranding campaign. Cortal Consors was a subsidiary of BNP Paribas.

By 2010, Cortal Consors had more than 1 million customers in three countries (France, Germany and Spain).

In 2013 BNP Paribas launched its new direct bank, Hello bank! in France and a few other European countries to replace Cortal Consors. In December 2014, services in Germany were relaunched under the Consorsbank brand, adopting a very similar logo to Hello Bank!. In 2015 the accounts of French Cortal Consors customers were transferred to Hello bank! France and in 2016 Cortal Consors France ceased its operations.

In Spain, services are now offered under the "BNP Paribas Personal Investors" brand.

== See also ==
- Compagnie Bancaire
