= BNP Paribas =

French multinational banking and financial services company

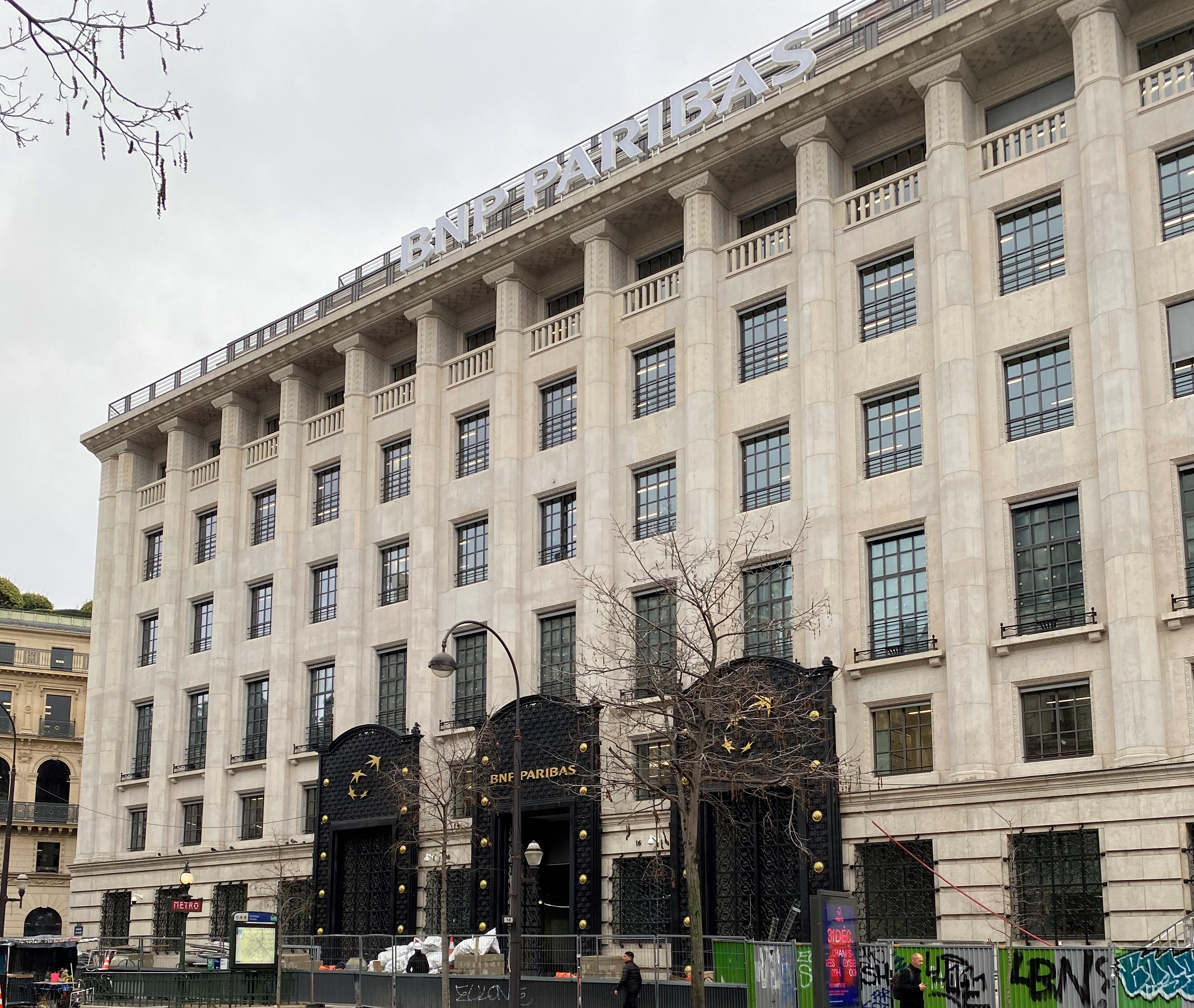
- The headquarters of BNP Paribas in Paris
- Type: Public
- Traded as: Euronext Paris: BNP; LSE: 0HB5; CAC 40 component (BNP)
- Industry: Financial services
- Founded: 10 March 1848; 178 years ago creation of Comptoir national d'escompte de Paris, predecessor of BNP; 27 January 1872; 154 years ago creation of Banque de Paris et des Pays-Bas, later called Paribas; 23 May 2000; 26 years ago merging as BNP Paribas
- Headquarters: 20 Boulevard des Italiens; Paris, France
- Area served: Worldwide
- Key people: Jean Lemierre (Chairman); Jean-Laurent Bonnafé (CEO)
- Products: Asset management; Banking; Commodities; Credit cards; Equities trading; Insurance; Investment banking; Investment management; Mortgage loans; Mutual funds; Private equity; Securities services; Risk management; Wealth management
- Revenue: ▲€51.22 billion (2025)
- Operating income: ▲€16.29 billion (2025)
- Net income: ▲€12.225 billion (2025)
- Total assets: ▲€2.793 trillion (2025)
- Total equity: ▼€132.17 billion (2025)
- Number of employees: 180,000 (2025)
- Divisions: List: BNP Paribas Asset Management BNP Paribas Cardif BNP Paribas Factor BNP Paribas Fortis BNP Paribas Real Estate
- Subsidiaries: List: Arval Banca Nazionale del Lavoro Cetelem Hello bank! BMCI
- Website: group.bnpparibas.com

BNP Paribas (French: [beɛnpe paʁiba]; sometimes referred to as BNPP, Paribas or BNP) is a French multinational universal bank and financial services holding company headquartered in Paris. It was founded in 2000 from the merger of two of France's foremost financial institutions, Banque Nationale de Paris (BNP) and Paribas. It also incorporates many other major institutions through successive acquisitions, including Fortis Bank in Belgium, Direkt Anlage Bank in Germany, Banca Nazionale del Lavoro in Italy, Banque Générale du Luxembourg in Luxembourg, and Türk Ekonomi Bankası in Turkey. The group also had a presence in the United States through its subsidiaries Bank of the West until 2023 and First Hawaiian Bank until 2019. With 190,000 employees, the bank is organized into three major business areas: Commercial, Personal Banking & Services (CPBS); Investment & Protection Services (IPS); and Corporate & Institutional Banking (CIB).

BNP Paribas is listed on Euronext Paris and is a component of the Euro Stoxx 50 stock market index. It is the second largest bank in Europe and eighth largest bank in the world by total assets. It became one of the five largest banks in the world following the 2008 financial crisis. It is considered a systemically important bank by the Financial Stability Board. In the Forbes Global 2000, BNP Paribas was ranked as the 33rd largest public company in the world. It has been designated as a Significant Institution since the entry into force of European Banking Supervision in late 2014, and as a consequence is directly supervised by the European Central Bank.

Although a French banking group, the Belgian government has been a significant shareholder since 2009 (with 5.3% equity ownership as of mid-2023) as a result of the group's acquisition of Fortis Bank Belgium, heir to the Société Générale de Belgique established in 1822.

According to S&P Global's April 2026 report, BNP Paribas is Europe's largest bank by assets, with $3.279 trillion in assets.

== History ==
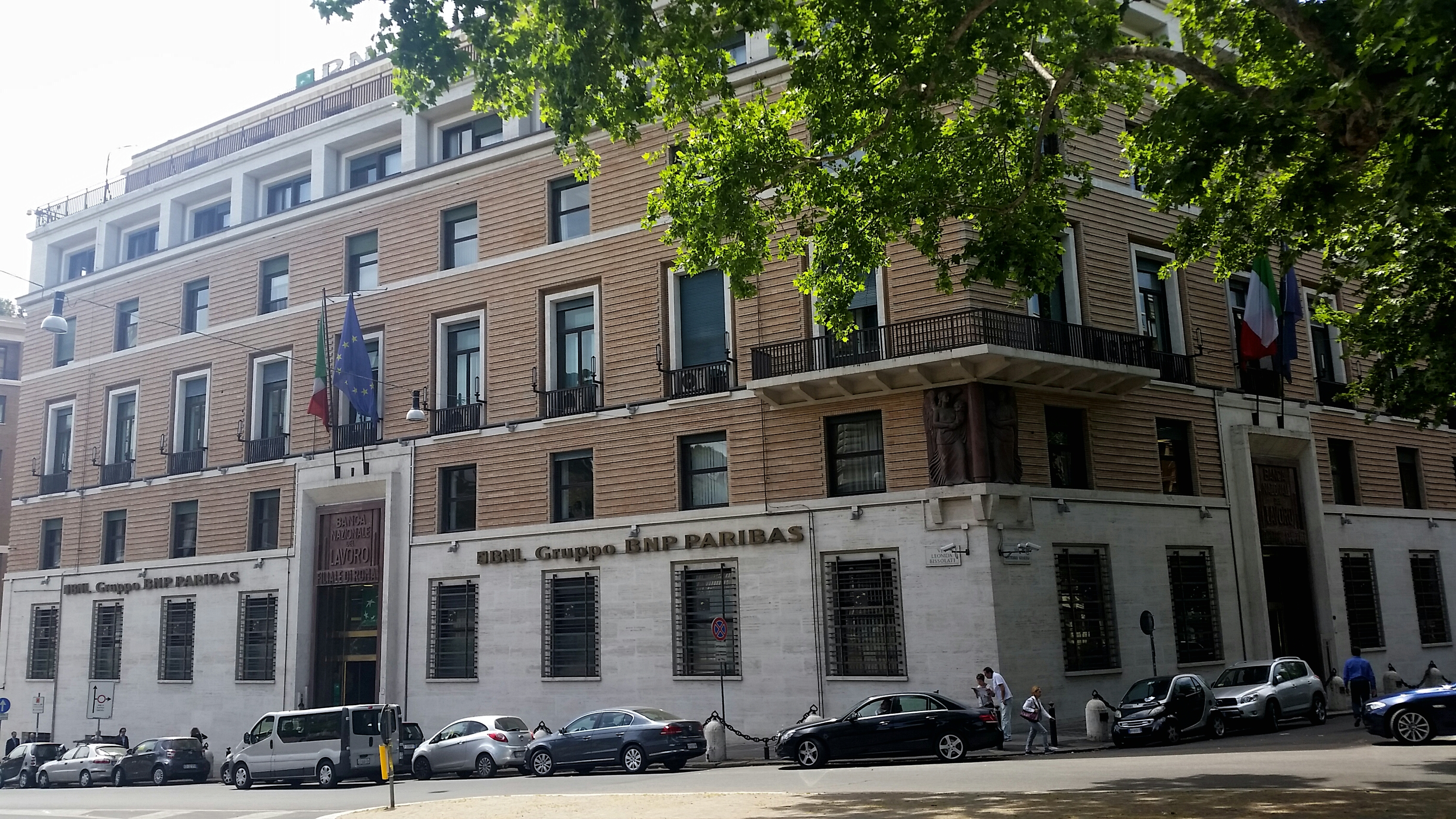
Former headquarters of Banca Nazionale del Lavoro in Rome

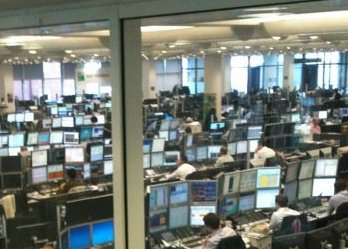
BNP Paribas London Trading Floor

=== Creation of BNP Paribas Group ===
In 1999, BNP and Société Générale fought a complex battle on the stock market, with Société Générale bidding for Paribas and BNP bidding for Société Générale and counter-bidding for Paribas. BNP's bid for Société Générale failed, while its bid for Paribas succeeded, which led to a merger of BNP and Paribas one year later on 23 May 2000.

In 2006, BNP Paribas purchased Banca Nazionale del Lavoro (BNL), Italy's sixth-largest bank. On 9 August 2007, BNP Paribas became the first major financial group to acknowledge the impact of the sub-prime crisis by closing two funds exposed to it. This day is now generally seen as the start of the 2008 financial crisis and the bank's quick reaction saved it from the fate of other large European banks such as UBS.

=== 2008 financial crisis and acquisitions ===
On 6 October 2008, BNP took over 75% of troubled bank Fortis' activities in Belgium, and 66% in Luxembourg, in exchange for the Belgian government becoming the new group's major shareholder. The sales of the Fortis shares was suspended by a court order from the Court of Appeal on Friday, 12 December. In the end of January, the Belgian government and BNP negotiated for a 75% partnership in Fortis Bank Belgium. Fortis Insurance Belgium would be reintegrated in Fortis Holding.

On 11 February, Fortis' shareholders decided that Fortis Bank Belgium and Fortis Insurance Belgium should not become the property of BNP Paribas. However, the acquisition was completed, and BNP Paribas took 75% shareholding and renamed the new subsidiary BNP Paribas Fortis. After this only Fortis Insurance International was left in Fortis Holding and this was renamed as Ageas, a business that had Insurance all over Europe and Asia. In April 2024, it was announced BNP Paribas had acquired Fosun International's entire 9% stake in Ageas, worth €730 million. The remaining Fortis Bank Netherlands was in the hands of the Dutch Government which merged it with other ABN AMRO holdings it already owned under the name ABN AMRO.

In May 2009, BNP Paribas became the majority shareholder (65.96%) of BGL (formerly Fortis Bank Luxembourg), the State of Luxembourg retaining 34% making BNP the eurozone's largest bank by deposits held. On 21 September, the bank's registered name was changed to BGL BNP Paribas and in February 2010, BGL BNP Paribas became the 100% owner of BNP Paribas Luxembourg. The transfer was finalised on 1 October 2010 with the incorporation of BNP Paribas Luxembourg's business in the operational platforms of BGL BNP Paribas.

=== Post-financial crisis expansion ===
BNP Paribas reached an agreement in December 2013 to acquire Rabobank's Polish unit BGZ Bank for around $1.4 billion. In 2013 BNP Paribas was awarded the Bank of the Year award by The International Financing Review ("IFR"), Thomson Reuters' leading financial industry publication. In September 2014, BNP completed the purchase of BGZ Bank for a final fee stated in the media to be $1.3 billion.

In December 2021, BNP Paribas announced to exit US retail banking business by selling its Bank of the West to the Bank of Montreal for $16.3bn.

In November 2023, HSBC agreed to sell its hedge fund administration business in several markets, including Hong Kong, Singapore, Ireland, and Luxembourg to BNP Paribas' Securities Services.

In April 2024, BNP Paribas acquired Fosun International's entire 9% stake in Belgian insurance company Ageas for €730 million, and BNP Paribas further increased its stake in Ageas up to 15,07% in February 2025. In September 2024, BNP Paribas acquired HSBC private banking activities in Germany. BNP Paribas has around $80 billion under management in Asia by 2024. The bank has hired 20 private bankers, including Tiffeny Situ from Morgan Stanley, Wendy Chan from Citigroup and Martin Loh from Credit Suisse Group, as part of its expansion program.

BNP Paribas and BPCE have finalized an agreement of a joint venture to create Estreem, to become a top-three European payment processor in February 2025. The company is expected to handle 17 billion transactions annually, which will make it the leader with 30% volume of card payment in France.

In February 2025, Karine Delvallee has been appointed as the new regional head for Southeast Asia by BNP Paribas and the CEO of its Singapore branch. Delvallee, who was formerly the CEO of BNP Paribas Australia and New Zealand, will now be overseeing operations in Singapore, Malaysia, Indonesia, Thailand, and Vietnam, with a focus on growth strategy and strengthening client relationships. However, she will also continue to supervise service over Australia and New Zealand as well.

In February 2025, Philippe Maillard was appointed as group COO by BNP Paribas. His tenure would be effective from 11 February, replacing Laurent David. As a company veteran since 1992, Maillard will oversee technology, IT, data, and operations. He will also be joining the bank's executive committee.

In March 2025, Matthew Ponsonby, BNP Paribas' UK head of global banking, resigned from his position. The bank stated a successor will be announced soon. Ponsonby, who joined in 2017, expressed pride in the progress made during his tenure and mentioned moving to an undisclosed "compelling opportunity." Under his leadership, BNP Paribas expanded its investment banking activities in Europe, particularly in the UK, making notable progress in mergers and acquisitions.

In June 2025, BNP Paribas agreed to acquire the custody and depositary bank business of HSBC Germany. In July 2025, HSBC has announced the sales of its fund administration business in Germany, i.e. Internationale Kapitalanlagegesellschaft (INKA), to a fund managed by BlackFin Capital Partners.

The first of July 2025, BNP Paribas acquired Axa Investment Managers from Axa.

On 22 September 2025, the Financial Times reported that BNP Paribas had dropped its previous pledge not to finance companies involved in the production of so-called controversial weapons. The policy change aligns with a broader shift in European banks' approach to defense sector financing.

In December 2025, BNP Paribas announced an expansion of its investment banking activities in both the United States and the United Kingdom, including new hires in London and New York aimed at strengthening its mergers and acquisitions advisory capabilities.

Gilles Zeitoun succeeded Charlotte Dennery as Director and chief executive officer of BNP Paribas Personal Finance on 1 January 2026. Dennery became chair of the board of directors and Senior Advisor for the Commercial, Personal Banking & Services division.

== Financial data ==
In 2022, total revenues of €50.4 billion represent an increase of 9% compared to 2021, BNP Paribas remains at the top of the French banks' ranking in terms of activity. During this year, BNP Paribas Group net income attributable to equity holders increased to 7.5% (to 10.2 billion euros). The geographic breakdown of Net Banking Income (NBI) at the end of 2020 is as follows: Europe (72.2%), North America (12.9%), Asia Pacific (8.6%) and others (6.3%).

Financial data in € billions
Year	2013	2014	2015	2016	2017	2018	2019	2020	2021	2022
Revenue	38.822	39.168	42.938	43.411	43.161	42.516	44.597	44.275	46.235	50.419
Net Income	5.439	0.507	7.044	8.115	8.207	7.526	8.173	7.067	9.488	10.196
Assets	1,800.139	2,077.759	1,994.193	2,076.959	1,960.252	2,041	2,165	2,488	2,634	2,666
Employees	185,000	188,000	189,000	192,000	196,000	203,000	199,000	193,000	190,000	190,000

== Corporate identity ==
Français: BNP Paribas logo

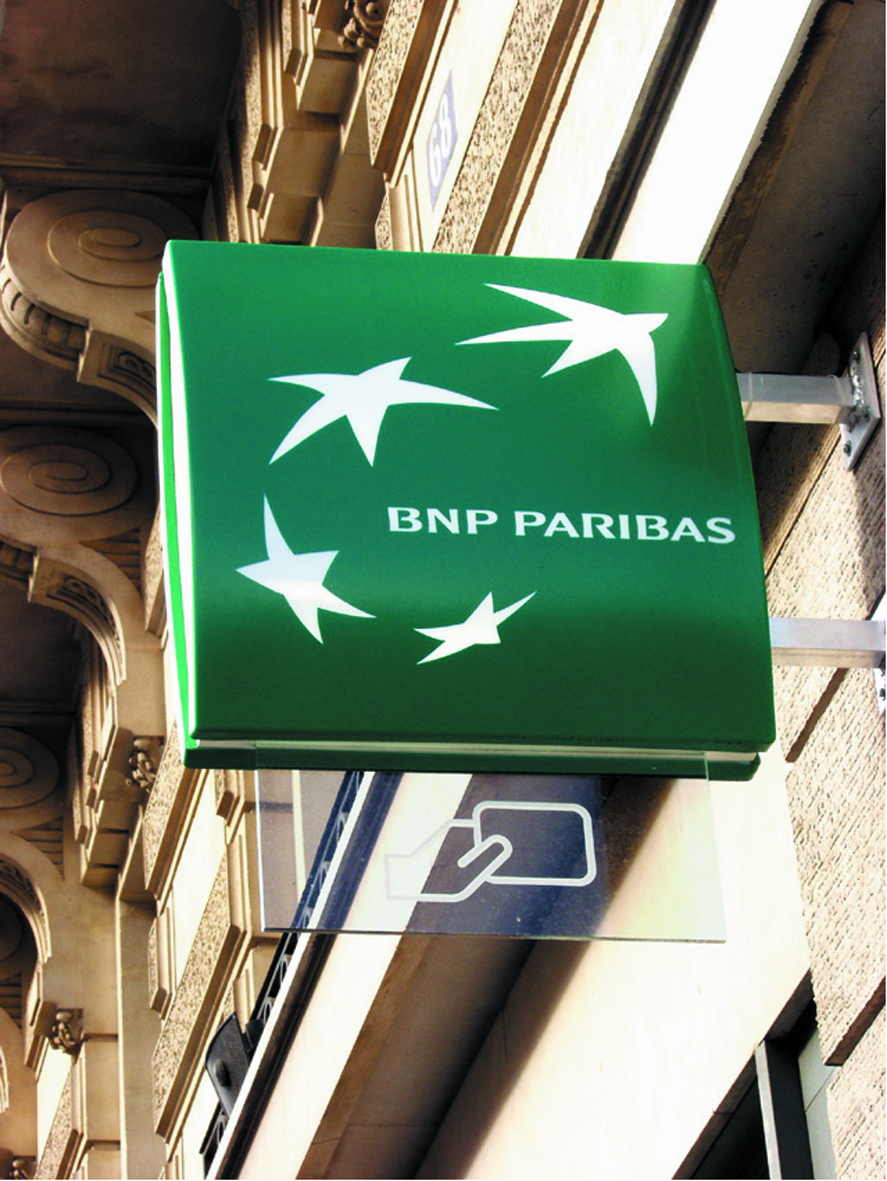
Design BNP Paribas par Laurent Vincenti pour A&Co

The BNP Paribas logo since 2000 (designed by Laurent Vincent under the leadership of the Communications Director, Antoine Sire) is called the "courbe d'envol" (curve of taking flight). The stars allude to Europe and universality. The transformation of the stars into birds conveys openness, freedom, growth, and the ability to change and adapt. The shape and movement of the curve places the logo in the universe of life. The green square symbolises nature and optimism.

== Corporate structure ==
=== Executive Committee ===
The General Management and the executive committee are composed as follows:

- Jean-Laurent Bonnafé, director and chief executive officer
- Yann Gérardin, chief operating officer and executive chairman of Corporate & Institutional Banking (CIB)
- Thierry Laborde, chief operating officer, in charge of Commercial, Personal Banking & Services (CPBS)
- Renaud Dumora, deputy chief operating officer, in charge of Investment & Protection Services (IPS)
- Yannick Jung, deputy chief operating officer, in charge of the commercial and personal banking businesses in the Euro zone within CPBS
- Olivier Osty, deputy chief operating officer and chief executive officer of Corporate & Institutional Banking (CIB)
- Michael Anseeuw, cirector and chief executive officer and chairman of the executive board of BNP Paribas Fortis
- Marc Camus, chief information officer
- Elena Goitini, chief executive officer of BNL
- Elise Hermant, head of communications
- Stephanie Maarek, chief compliance officer
- Pauline Leclerc-Glorieux, director and chief executive officer of BNP Paribas Cardif
- Isabelle Loc, head of Commercial & Personal Banking in France
- Stéphanie Maarek, chief compliance officer
- Lars Machenil, chief financial officer
- Philippe Maillard, group chief operating officer
- Sandro Pierri, chief executive officer of BNP Paribas Asset Management
- Anne Pointet, head of Company Engagement
- Frank Roncey, chief risk officer
- Sarah Roussel, head of Human Resources
- Gilles Zeitoun, director and chief executive officer of BNP Paribas Personal Finance

=== Board of directors ===
As of 13 May 2023

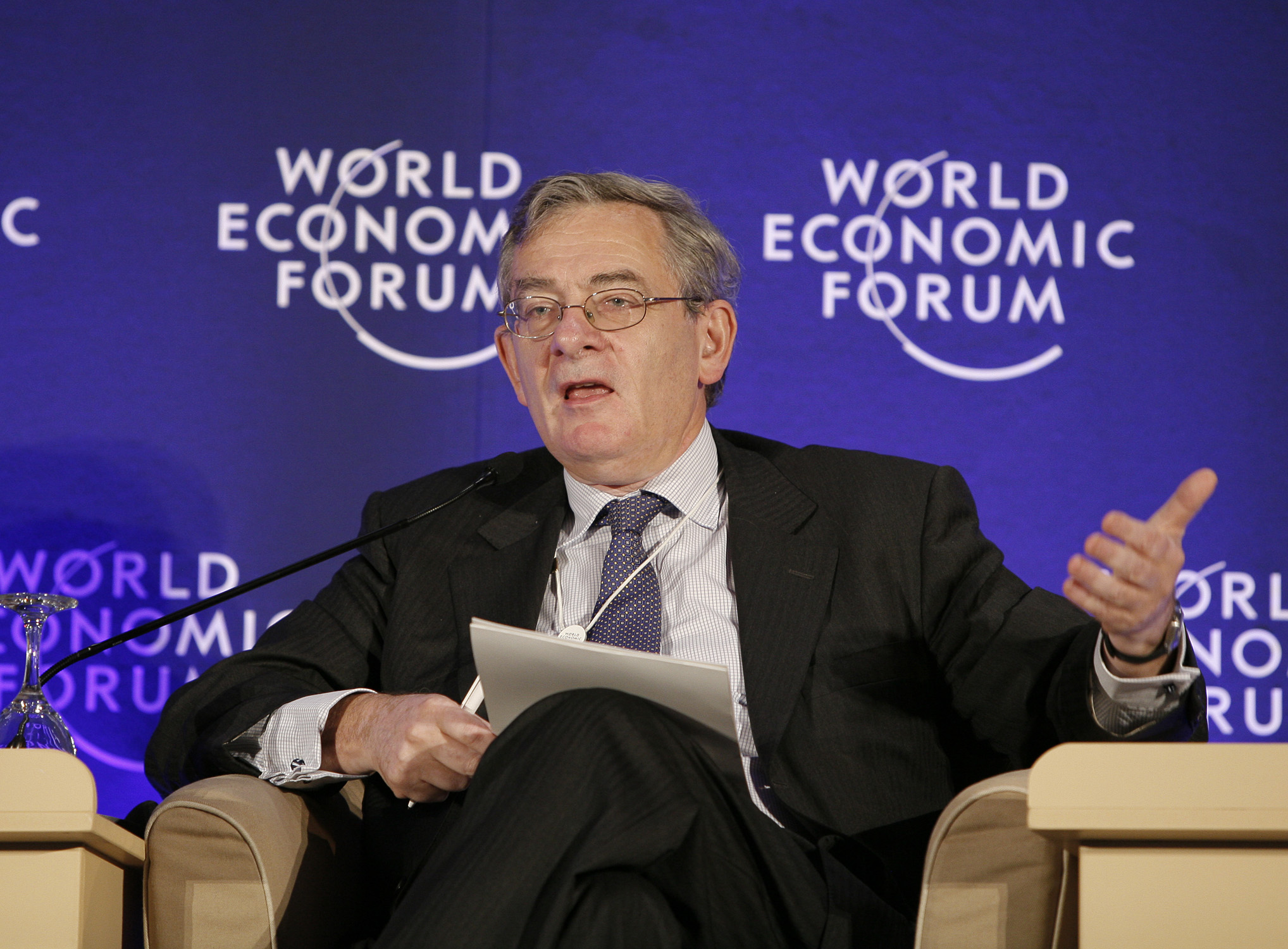
Jean Lemierre, Senior Adviser to the chairman, BNP Paribas Group, France, at the World Economic Forum on Europe and Central Asia in Istanbul, 30 October – 1 November 2008

- Jean Lemierre (chairman), former president of the European Bank for Reconstruction and Development
- Jean-Laurent Bonnafé, director and CEO of BNP Paribas
- Jacques Aschenbroich, chairman of the board of directors of Orange Group
- Juliette Brisac, Senior Advisor to the Head of Company Engagement of BNP Paribas Group
- Valérie Chort, director of companies
- Hugues Epaillard, BNP Paribas Real Estate business manager
- Vanessa Lepoultier, Financial Advisor
- Lieve Logghe, Chief Financial Officer of Boortmalt International
- Marie-Christine Lombard, CEO and chairman of the executive board of Geodis
- Bertrand de Mazières, director of companies
- Christian Noyer, director of companies
- Nicolas Peter, chairman of the supervisory board of BMW AG
- Guillaume Poupard, Chief Trust Officer of Orange Group
- Annemarie Straathof, director of companies

Other Corporate officers :

- Yann Gérardin, CEO of BNP Paribas and Executive Chairman of Corporate & Institutional Banking (CIB)
- Thierry Laborde, CEO of BNP Paribas in charge of Commercial, Personal Banking & Services (CPBS)

=== Major shareholders ===
As of 31 December 2024

- European institutional investors (37.3%)
- Non-European institutional investors (33.4%)
- BlackRock Inc. (6.0%)
- Belgian State (through SFPI) (5.6%)
- Amundi (5.0%)

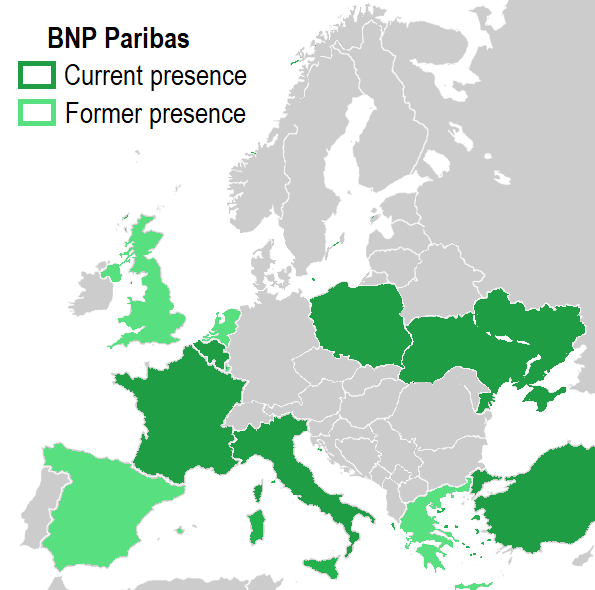
European presence

=== Main subsidiaries ===
==== Retail banking ====
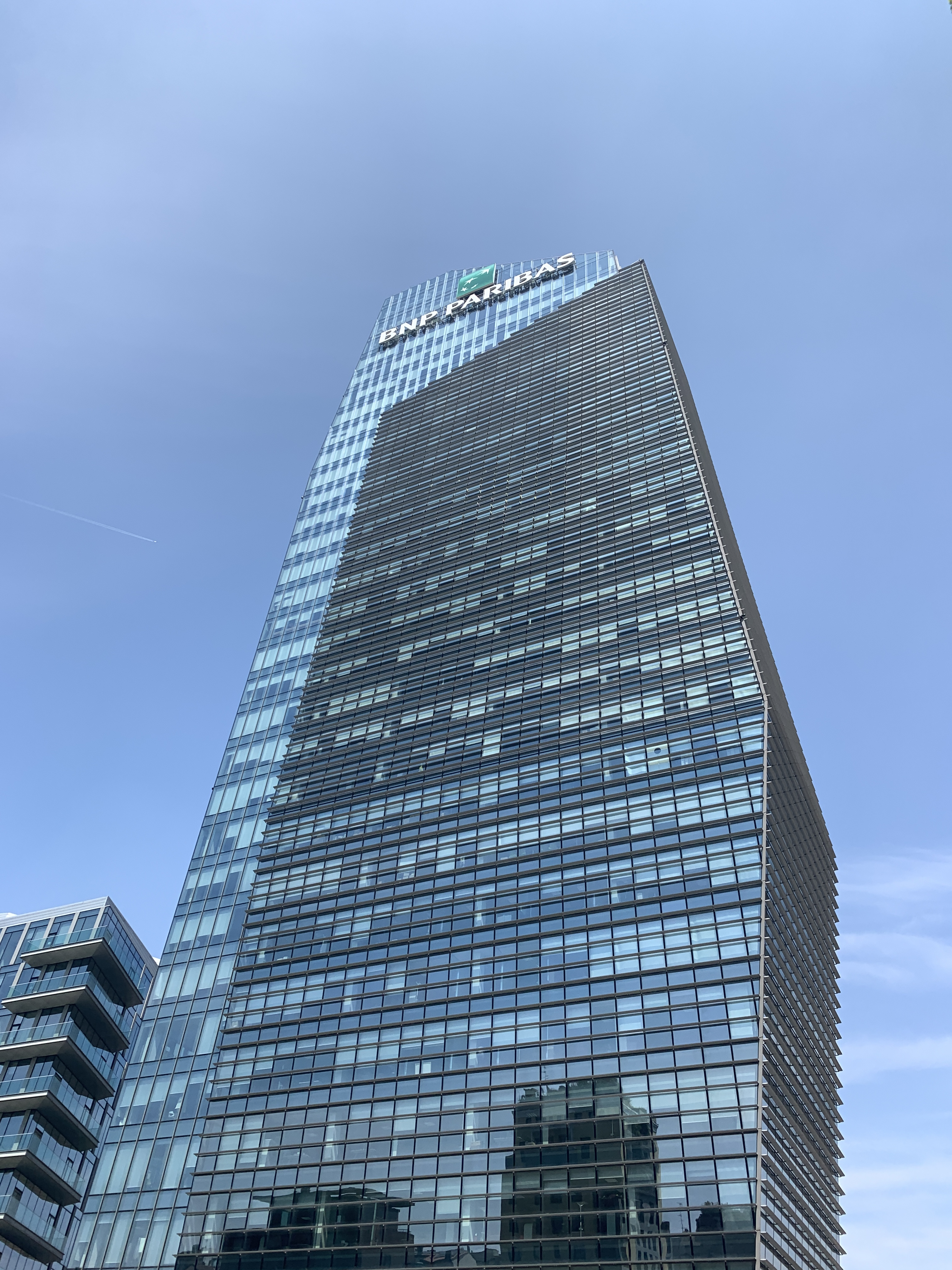
Italian Headquarters in Milan

- BNP Paribas France (more than 2 200 branches)
- BNP Paribas El Djazaïr (Algeria)
- BMCI (Morocco)

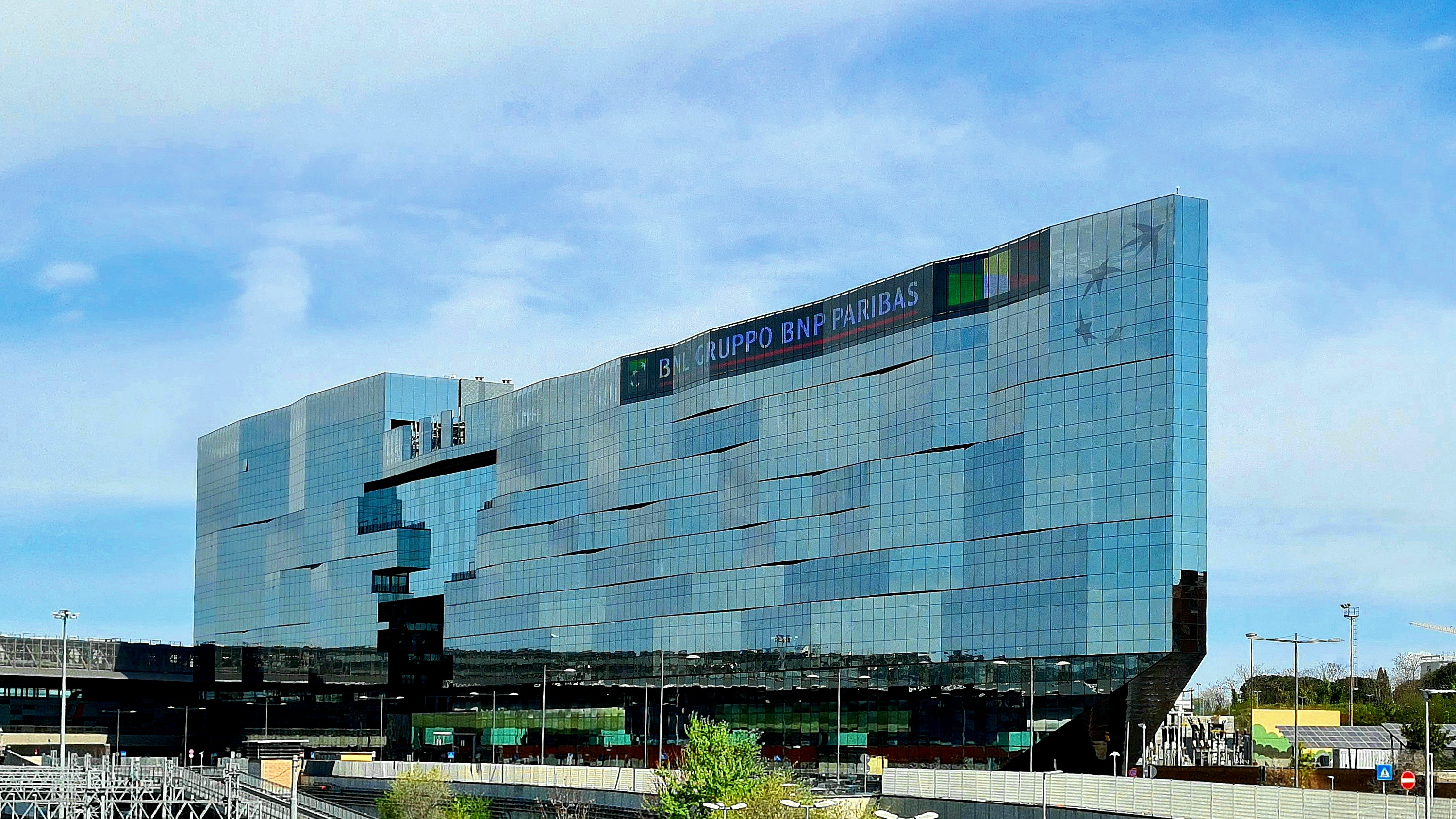
Orizzonte Europa, BNL headquarters in Rome subsidiary of BNP Paribas

- Banca Nazionale del Lavoro (BNL) (Italy)
- Turk Ekonomi Bankasi (TEB) (Turkey, Kosovo)
- BNP Paribas Fortis (Belgium, Germany, Poland, Turkey)
- BGL BNP Paribas (Luxembourg)
- Hello bank!
- Ukrsibbank (Ukraine)
- Banque de Wallis et Futuna
- BNP Paribas Bank Polska (Poland)

==== Other subsidiaries ====
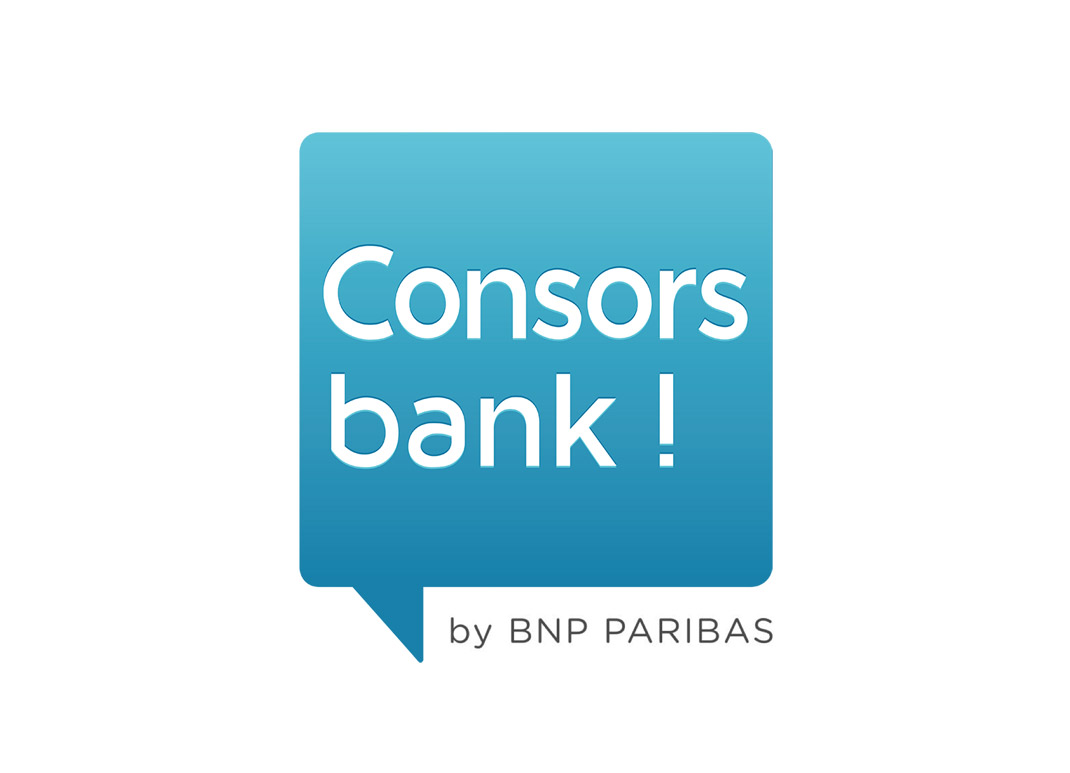
Consorsbank

- Alfred Berg
- BNP Paribas Arbitrage
- BNP Paribas Assurances with Cardif, Pinnacle
- BNP Paribas Asset Management
- BNP Paribas Partners for Innovation
- BNP Paribas Personal Finance UK (Creation Financial Services Limited and Creation Consumer Finance Limited)
- BNP Paribas Primebrokerag
- BNP Paribas Real Estate (formerly Atisreal)
- BNP Paribas Leasing Solutions with Arval, and Artegy
- BNP Paribas Securities Services (12,000 employees worldwide in 2019)
- BNP Paribas Wealth Management
- Cetelem
- Consors Finanz
- Cortal Consors
- FundQuest
- SBI Life Insurance Company Limited a joint venture insurance company with State Bank of India, India's largest financial service company
- L'Atelier BNP Paribas
- BNP Paribas Personal Investors Luxembourg
- Protection 24
- SAIB-BNP Paribas Asset Management

== Divisions ==
=== BNP Paribas CIB ===
BNP Paribas CIB
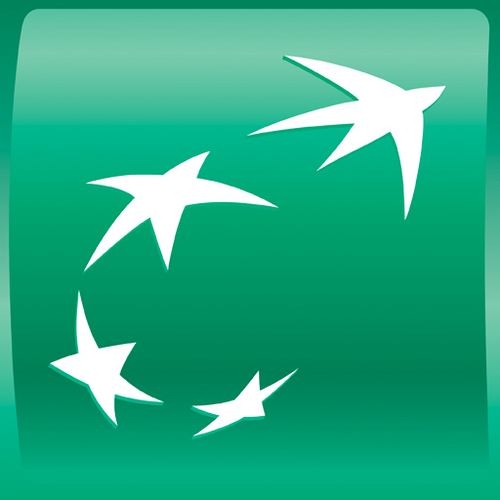

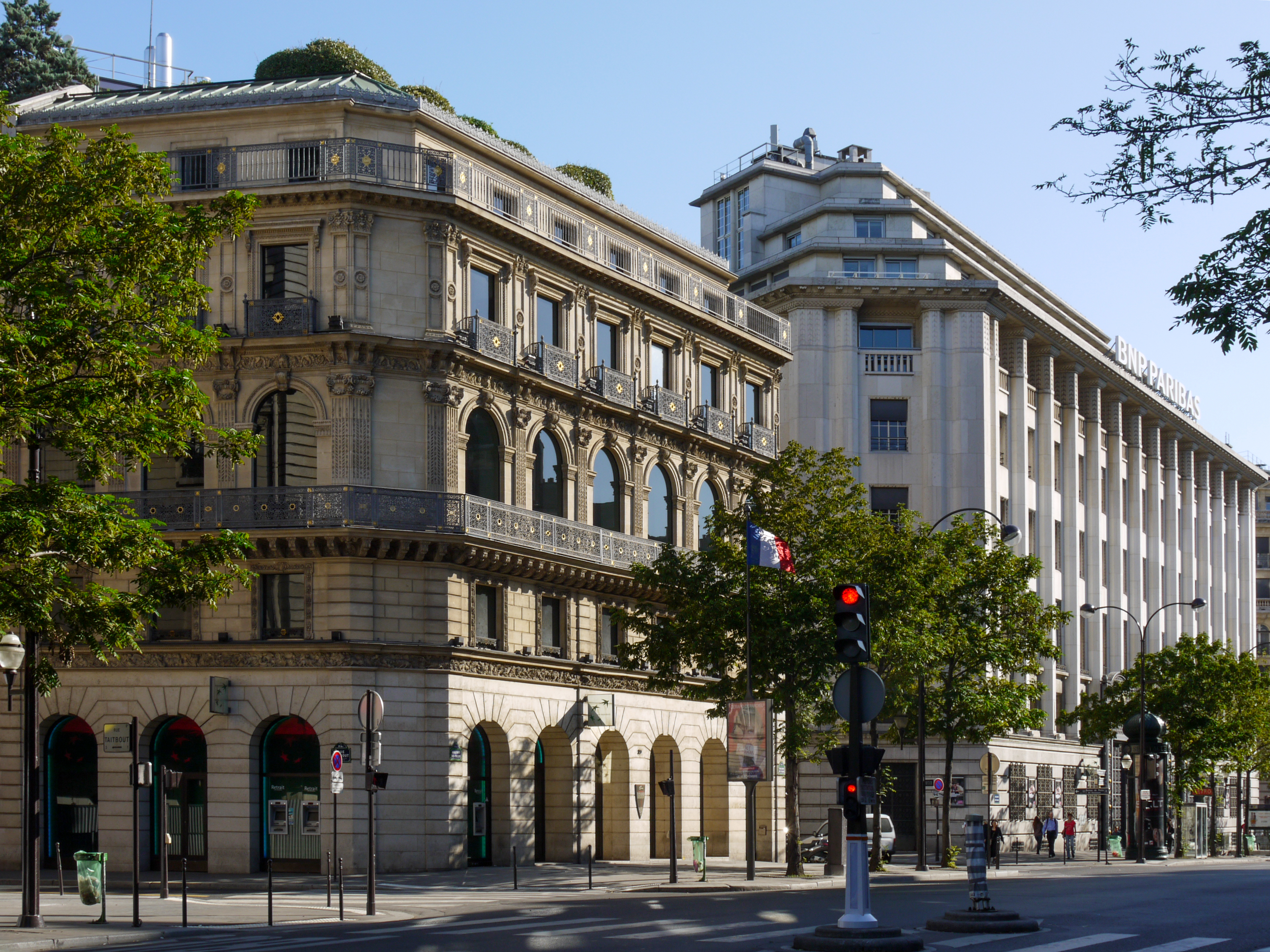
- The Maison dorée, home to Parisian operations of BNP Paribas CIB, with the registered office of BNP Paribas in the background
- Type: Subsidiary of BNP Paribas
- Industry: Financial services
- Founded: 23 May 2000
- Headquarters: Paris, France
- Products: Corporate banking Investment banking
- Revenue: US$27.6 billion (2008)
- Net income: 12,225,000,000 euro (2025)
- Total assets: €3.1 trillion (2010)
- Number of employees: 17,000 (2007)
- Website: cib.bnpparibas.com

BNP Paribas Corporate and Institutional Banking (CIB) is the global investment banking arm of BNP Paribas, a French multinational bank. In October 2010, BNP Paribas was ranked by Bloomberg and Forbes as the largest bank and largest company in the world by assets with over US$3.1 trillion.

BNP Paribas CIB's main centres are in Paris and London, with large scale operations in New York, Hong Kong, and Singapore, and smaller operations in almost every financial centre in the world. It employs 185,000 people across 56 countries and provides financing, advisory and capital markets services. BNP Paribas CIB is a globally recognised leader in two areas of expertise: trading derivatives on all asset classes, and structured financing. BNP Paribas CIB also has a large corporate advisory network in Europe and Asia. BNP Paribas CIB has 13,000 clients, consisting of companies, financial institutions, governments, investment funds and hedge funds.

BNP Paribas CIB benefits from the Group's large asset base (over €2 trillion) and diverse business model, and was resilient through the 2008 financial crisis. Revenues from BNP Paribas CIB nearly doubled in the second quarter of 2009 as robust investor demand boosted revenues from the bank's fixed income trading business unit. CIB's revenues totaled €3.351 billion (US$4.82 billion) for the quarter, up 81 percent from the second quarter of 2008, and following record revenues of €3.696 billion in the first quarter of 2009.

=== BNP Paribas Real Estate ===
BNP Paribas Real Estate, formerly Atisreal, is a European commercial property consultancy company and subsidiary of BNP Paribas with around 2,600 employees in 51 cities.

Atisreal was formed in 2003 when the Vendome Rome Group acquired three leading European surveying firms: Auguste-Thouard in France, Müller in Germany and Weatherall Green & Smith in the UK. In 2006, Atisreal became a subsidiary of BNP Paribas Real Estate. In June 2009 the Atisreal brand was dropped and the BNP Paribas Real Estate brand replaced it. Its headquarters were in Levallois-Perret, France.

=== BNP Paribas Asset Management ===
BNP Paribas Asset Management
- Type: Société Anonyme
- Industry: Asset management/Financial services
- Founded: 2007; 19 years ago
- Headquarters: Paris, France
- Area served: Worldwide
- Key people: Sandro Pierri (CEO)
- Revenue: 51,223,000,000 euro (2025)
- Net income: 12,225,000,000 euro (2025)
- AUM: Over €1.6 trillion (combined entity after recent mergers) (February 2026)
- Number of employees: ~2,000–3,300 (asset management division)
- Website: bnpparibas-am.com

BNP Paribas Asset Management is the dedicated, autonomous asset management branch of BNP Paribas and the third largest asset management firm in Europe, with over €1.6 trillion in assets under management (AUM).

==== History ====
In 2007, BNP Paribas regrouped its functions in asset management under the brand name BNP Paribas Investment Partners.

In 2010, the closing of the transaction between BNP Paribas Investment Partners and Fortis Investments was completed.

In June 2017, BNP Paribas Investment Partners rebranded as BNP Paribas Asset Management.

In August 2024, BNP Paribas Asset Management entered exclusive talks with Axa for the acquisition of Axa Investment Managers for €5.1bn, in order to create one of the largest asset management firms in Europe, with around €1.5tn of assets under management. On 21 December 2024, Axa and BNP Paribas signed the purchase agreement of Axa Investment Managers by Cardif (BNP Paribas' insurance company) and the takeover was completed on 1 July 2025.

On 31 December 2025, BNP Paribas merged AXA investment Managers and BNP Paribas Real Estate Investment Management (BNPP REIM) into BNP Paribas Asset Management in order to create a single asset management entity. Following this merger, BNP Paribas Asset Management became the third largest asset management firm in Europe (after Amundi and UBS Asset Management), with over €1.6 trillion in assets under management (AUM).

=== BNP Paribas Hong Kong ===
BNP Paribas Hong Kong SAR China BNP Paribas Private Bank
- Industry: other monetary intermediations
- Founded: 1958
- Headquarters: Hong Kong
- Key people: Paul Yang, Chief Executive Officer, APAC BNP Paribas; Hugo Leung, Head of Territory, Hong Kong, BNP Paribas
- Products: Financial services
- Revenue: 51,223,000,000 euro (2025)
- Net income: 12,225,000,000 euro (2025)
- Number of employees: 2500
- Website: www.bnpparibas.com.hk

BNP Paribas Hong Kong and BNP Paribas Private Bank are subsidiaries of BNP Paribas and licensed banks in Hong Kong SAR China. It is one of the top foreign banks operating in Hong Kong.

BNP Paribas acquired Peregrine and renamed BNP Paribas Peregrine, a famous investment bank and brokerage in 1998. BNP Paribas Peregrine is headquartered in Hong Kong, with a presence in all major East Asian countries, as well as sales teams in London, Paris and Milan. BNP Paribas has a branch in Macau, and also operational branches and two representative offices in mainland China. The Peregrine name has since been absorbed and is no longer used.

== Notable current and former employees ==
=== Business ===
- Nassim Taleb – Practitioner of financial mathematics, author of The Black Swan, Fooled by Randomness and Dynamic Hedging, and former BNP Paribas prop trader in New York City.
- Chris Innes, Head of Equities and Derivatives for Americas from 2010 to 2017

=== Politics and public service ===
- Louis Alphonse of Bourbon, Duke of Anjou – considered by royalists as the head of the French Royal House
- Jacques de Larosière – managing director of the International Monetary Fund (1978–87); Governor of the Banque de France (1987–93)
- Lorenz of Habsburg, Archduke of Austria-Este
- François Villeroy de Galhau, Governor of the Bank of France since 2015

=== Other ===
- David McWilliams - economist

== Controversies ==
=== Antisemitic allegations ===
In 2016 BNP reached an undisclosed settlement with a Jewish employee, following a $40M lawsuit. The employee had been made to watch a training video in the form of a parody of the movie Downfall, portraying Adolf Hitler as the CEO of Deutsche Bank, one of BNP's competitors and the Nazi soldiers around him as Deutsche Bank executives. Also, his colleagues made a number of anti-semitic comments during his time at BNP Paribas.

=== Business with sanctioned countries ===
On 30 May 2014, The Wall Street Journal reported that the United States Department of Justice was negotiating a possible guilty plea with BNP Paribas as well as the size of the resulting fine for violating U.S. regulations and evading US sanctions. The Justice Department sought a fine of more than US $10 billion, which was expected to be reduced to $8 or $9 billion in negotiations. BNP Paribas was said to have laundered up to US$100 billion from the sanctioned countries of Sudan, Iran, and Cuba.

On 1 July 2014, BNP Paribas pled guilty in a New York state court to falsifying business records as well as conspiracy in connection to those falsifications. It was also expected to plead guilty in federal court to violating laws against money-laundering. It agreed to pay $8.9 billion, the largest fine ever for violating U.S. sanctions, and substantially more than the previous record of $1.9 billion. BNP Paribas was also barred for one year under the plea agreement from certain US dollar-dominated transactions. The fine exceeded the bank's $6.4 billion 2013 annual income and the $1.1 billion it previously had allocated for the anticipated fine.

The bank's failure to cooperate with the multi-year investigation was given as a significant factor in the size of the fine. Additionally, BNP Paribas continued to process sanctioned transactions after the investigation began. After the fine was announced, BNP said it would be "just fine" and that it had "a comprehensive plan" to avoid similar violations in the future. The company's stock, which had fallen 12% since news of the investigation first leaked, rose 4% on the announcement. To comply with the transaction ban, BNP Paribas will use a third party to clear its US transactions.

On 6 February 2024, the Federal Reserve announced that it had lifted a pair of 2014 enforcement actions it imposed on France's BNP Paribas, after the bank overhauled its compliance with U.S. sanctions laws.

=== Check processing ===
In 2010 the French government's Autorité de la concurrence fined BNP and 10 other banks €384 million for colluding to charge unjustified fees on check processing, including extra fees during the transition from paper check transfer to "Exchanges Check-Image" electronic transfer.

=== €152 million risk management affair ===
The German Frankfurter Allgemeine Zeitung FOCUS, Bloomberg and the French Les Échos newspapers published an article regarding a €152 million mistrade (erroneous trade) in which BNP Paribas Arbitrage was allegedly involved. The bank has sold securities for €326,400 to the investor Armin S. but the value of the securities is €163 million according to the bank. According to the article, the error remained unnoticed for several days. BNP has even reconfirmed the original price.

The Financial Times published an article in March 2018 about the case with the title "BNP Paribas failed to book trades in Germany for a week". It cites internal documents that show it did not book all trades that happened in structured products in Germany from 2 to 9 December 2015. The Financial Times estimates that 8,500 trades might have been affected. It also questions if the bank has hedged its positions if the trades have not been booked.

== Sponsorship ==
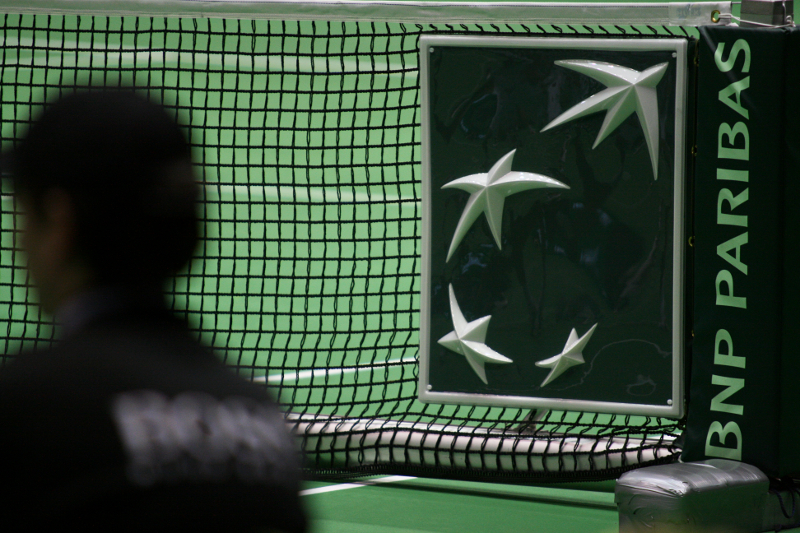
2011 Davis Cup in Zagreb

BNP Paribas has been a major sponsor of tennis. In 1973 it became the major sponsor of the French Open, one of the four prestigious Grand Slam tournaments in the sport. In 2001 the bank began to sponsor the Davis Cup before becoming the title sponsor in 2002. In 2002 it became the sponsor of the Paris Masters, an ATP World Tour Masters 1000 tournament.

In 2008 it became the sponsor of the BNP Paribas Primrose Bordeaux, an ATP Challenger Tour tournament. The company's sponsorship expanded to the United States in 2009 when it became the title sponsor of the Indian Wells Masters, an ATP World Tour Masters 1000 two-week tournament in California. It also sponsored the BNP Paribas Showdown and BNP Paribas Tennis Classic exhibition tournaments held in New York City and London respectively. The Stanford Classic, since 1992, is instead directly sponsored by the Bank of the West subsidiary.

In 2018, BNP Paribas created the production company BNP Paribas Pictures, and supports young cinema talents through an investment fund dedicated to the financing and co-production of the first films of new talents in Cinema, the Fonds Nouveaux Talents. In 2019, the group supports the Femis Residence and Mille visages, which aims to democratize the cinema environment and create bridges between the different professions in cinema. The group also participates in the restoration of cinematographic works such as Charlie Chaplin's "Modern Times" in 2003.

=== Football ===
Between 1981 and early May 2020, BNP Paribas was a partner of the Belgian club RSC Anderlecht for 39 years through BNP Paribas Fortis.

== See also ==
- BNL BNP Paribas headquarters
- List of banks in France
- List of banks in the euro area
