= DAB BNP Paribas =

German corporate subsidiary

Coordinates: 48.14368°N 11.50244°E

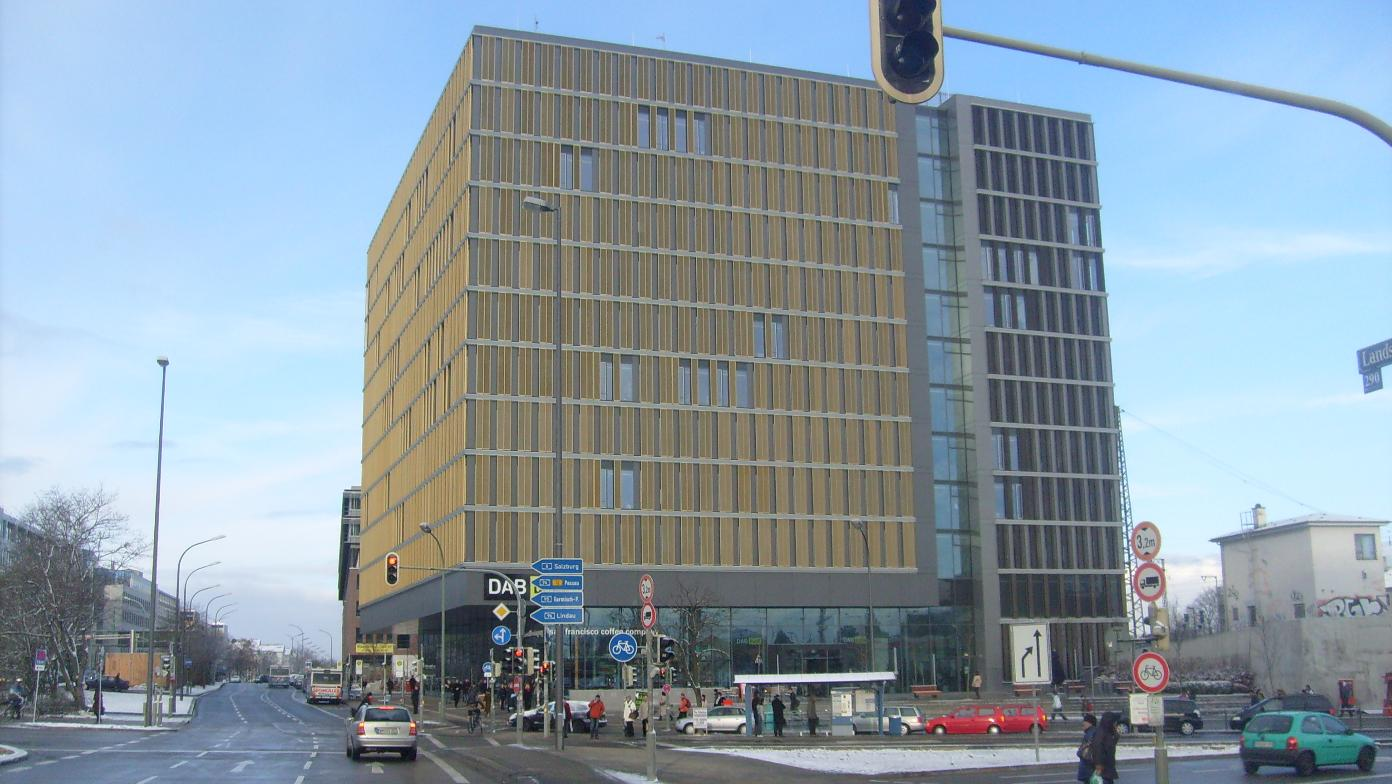
- Company type: S.A. (corporation), Joint-stock company
- Founded: 18 January 1994
- Headquarters: Munich, Germany
- Products: Credit cards; Loans; Savings; Trading; Insurance
- Total assets: €5,526.8 billion (2014)
- Number of employees: 606 (2014)
- Parent: BNP Paribas
- Website: b2b.dab-bank.de

DAB BNP Paribas is a brand of the German branch of the French major bank BNP Paribas with business premises in Munich. The BNP Paribas brand for independent asset managers, fund brokers, investment advisers and institutional clients was founded on 18 January 1994 as the first discount broker in Germany, trading under Direkt Anlage- und Vermögensverwaltungs-GmbH, and started operations in May 1994 as Direkt Anlage Bank GmbH (DAB). As of 1 January 2016, the operating private customer business was transferred to the BNP Paribas S.A. branch Germany. On 12/13 November 2016, the DAB bank's online portal was shut down and all private customers transferred to Consorsbank.

== Business model ==
After its integration with Consorsbank and all private customers being transferred there, DAB is focussed on the business with financial intermediaries such as asset managers, fund brokers, investment advisers, digital asset managers as well as banks and savings banks since its foundation. It offers institutional customers a central depository for securities of all asset classes. The fully integrated securities trading platform enables the trading of all types of securities at home and abroad in all common currencies via a custody account. With more than 9,000 funds of more than 200 CAGs, the DAB is one of the most important fund platforms for institutional investors in Europe.

After "the stock boom around the turn of the millennium and the significantly decreased order numbers, it had missed the change from pure online broker to digital full bank." In that course, the parent company BNP Paribas reorganized the business model in the context of the 1 January 2016 transfer of the operative business of the DAB bank to the BNP Paribas branch Germany. Deposits of Volkswagen Bank will continue to be held at the DAB BNP Paribas in Munich.

== Management ==
The company is managed by Thomas Zink and Dr. Sven Deglow (Co-CEOs).

== Stock market ==
In 1999, the DAB bank was placed on the stock exchange. The company was listed in the Prime Standard. In 2001, the bank was listed as part of the acquisition of the French online broker Selftrade on the Nouveau Marché (New Market) of the Paris Stock Exchange - the delisting in France took place in 2010.

As part of the takeover by BNP Paribas, the remaining minority shareholders were resigned and excluded by squeeze-out. The listing ended on 27 July 2015.

== Affiliation ==
The bank was founded as a subsidiary of Munich-based Hypo-Bank, which merged with Bayerische Vereinsbank in 1998 to form HypoVereinsbank. In 2005 it was taken over by Unicredit.

As of 28 February 2013, Unicredit Bank held 81.39% of the DAB bank shares, with 18.61% in free float.

At the beginning of August 2014, the French major bank BNP Paribas, which also owns Consorsbank, acquired an 81.4% stake for € 354 million. According to initial planning, it should have come to a fusion of the brands DAB bank and Consorsbank by the end of 2014 in Germany, but the merger with the DAB was completed in early 2016. The DAB bank thus had the same fate as the Consorsbank, it was integrated into the BNP Paribas S.A. branch Germany.

DAB was a member of the Cash Group until 31 January 2015.

== Statistics ==
DAB is currently one of the leading direct banks in Germany in the securities business, in terms of client numbers and client assets. As of 31 December 2012, the DAB Bank Group had 597,128 customers, for which it managed 615,288 accounts with a combined client asset of €28,38 billion. In 2012, it conducted 4,2 million customer transactions.

== History ==
- 1994: Founding of the Direkt Anlage Bank (DAB) as the first direct broker in Germany.
- 1996: Introduction of online banking.
- 1997: DAB becomes a stock corporation
- 1998: Through the DAB second trading DAB becomes the first discount broker with an off-exchange trading platform
- 1999: The DAB is listed on the stock exchange in the Nouveau Marché (New Market) segment; from 20 March 2000 to 24 March 2003 NEMAX 50 is included in its selection index.
- 2000: Deletion of deposit and account maintenance fee.
- 2001: Renaming to DAB Bank as part of the acquisition of Direct Brokers Selftrade.
- 2002: Selftrade is sold together with the DAB Bank (Switzerland). Purchase of the Austrian direktanlage.at by the Bank Austria.
- 2004: Acquisition of FondsServiceBank GmbH
- 2009: Sale of FondsServiceBank to Fondsdepot Bank, Hof
- 2015: Squeeze-out of the remaining small shareholders, the bank now belongs exclusively to BNP * Paribas
- 2016: The operative business is transferred to the BNP Paribas S.A. branch Germany. The business of the DAB Bank will be continued under the Consorsbank brand, which is also part of the BNP Paribas-Group. Thus, the brand DAB Bank disappears from the market.

== See also ==
- List of banks in Germany
