= Consors Finanz =

Consors Finanz BNP Paribas
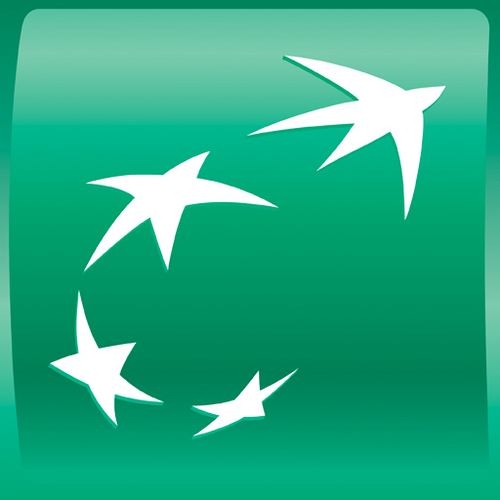
- Company type: Subsidiary
- Industry: Banking
- Founded: 2001; 25 years ago
- Headquarters: Munich, Germany
- Products: Loans
- Parent: BNP Paribas
- Website: www.consorsfinanz.de

Consors Finanz is a German consumer loan company that is a subsidiary of major French bank BNP Paribas. The focus of the business is the allocation of consumer loans, especially sales financing for retail and online trade as well as for car, caravan and motorbike dealers.

Products include installment credits, card products with drawing limit and bullet loans as well as additional insurance and accessory products in co-operation with partners. Business partners are trading companies of all sizes as well as banks and insurances.

The consumer loan sales work via direct cooperation with trading partners which use the financing products as an instrument of merchandising. Banks, insurances, organizations and institutions can also handle their consumer loan business via Consors Finanz as outsourcing partner.

The business is a member of the Association of German Banks.

== History ==
In 2001 Cetelem S.A. acquired 70% of the former WKV Bank in Munich and founded the Cetelem Bank GmbH. The bank was a Joint Venture of the BNP Paribas Personal Finance S.A. (former Cetelem S.A.) and of the Dresdner Bank AG. In 2005 an ownership structure of 50,1 % BNP Paribas Personal Finance S.A. and 49,9 % Dresdner Bank was agreed and the Cetelem Bank was changed to Dresdner-Cetelem Kreditbank GmbH. Through the merging of the Dresdner Bank with the Commerzbank the partnership shares were transferred to the Commerzbank AG in May 2009. In the beginning of June 2010 the Dresdner-Cetelem Kreditbank was changed to Commerz Finanz.

In August 2017 BNP Paribas Personal Finance and Commerzbank separated. BNP Paribas continues the business of the Commerz Finanz as sole shareholder. With the introduction of the brand Consors Finanz the bank bundled sales financing solutions for retail and online trade as well as for car, caravan and motorbike dealers.
