= Jean-Laurent Bonnafé =

French manager

- Born: 14 July 1961 (age 65); Albi, France
- Education: Lycée Louis-le-Grand; École polytechnique Mines ParisTech
- Occupation: CEO of BNP Paribas

Jean-Laurent Bonnafé (born 14 July 1961) has been the chief executive officer of BNP Paribas since 2011.

== Early life ==
The son of a Électricité de France (EDF) electrical engineer and a lawyer in Albi, Bonnafé attended the Lycée Louis-le-Grand and later graduated in engineering from the École polytechnique and École des Mines.

== Career ==
Following his studies, Bonnafé joined the Ministry of Industry before moving into private equity and then BNP in 1993. At BNP, he formulated the bank’s double bid for Société Générale (SocGen) and Paribas in 1999, which ended with BNP winning the latter but forced to drop its offer for SocGen. He was widely credited with implementing the acquisitions of Paribas, BNL and Fortis.

In 2008, he was appointed Chief Operating Officer (COO) of BNP Paribas, taking charge of the Group's entire retail banking activities. He subsequently became a senior civil servant at the Ministry of Industry, then a technical advisor to the Minister of Trade and Industry.

In 2011, Bonnafé was appointed as chief executive, taking over from Baudouin Prot. In 2017, his compensation was at $4.5 million.

In 2025, the General Meeting of Shareholders voted to renew his term as director for three years.

== Other activities ==
=== Corporate boards ===
- Hermès, Member of the Board of Directors (since 2025)
- Pierre Fabre, Member of the Board of Directors (since 2019)
- Banca Nazionale del Lavoro, Member of the Board of Directors (since 2009)
- Carrefour, Member of the Board of Directors (since 2008)
- BNP Paribas Fortis, Non-Executive Member of the Board of Directors (2011-2014)

=== Non-profit organizations ===
- Fédération Bancaire Française, Chairman (since 2017)
- Association pour le Rayonnement de l’Opéra de Paris (AROP), Chairman
- Bocconi University, Member of the International Advisory Council
- Entreprises pour l’Environnement, Vice-Chairman
- La France s’engage Foundation, Member of the Board

Business positions
Preceded by Michel Pébereau	CEO of BNP Paribas; 2011–present	Succeeded by Incumbent
