= BNP Paribas El Djazaïr =

Algerian bank

- Type: Subsidiary
- Industry: Financial services
- Founded: May 5, 2002; 24 years ago
- Headquarters: Alger, Algeria
- Number of locations: 71 (2024)
- Area served: Algeria
- Key people: Pierre Bérégovoy (Country Manager)
- Total assets: USD 2,2 billion (2024)
- Number of employees: 1300 (2024)
- Website: www.bnpparibas.dz

BNP Paribas El Djazaïr, is a medium-sized Algerian bank, a subsidiary of the French bank BNP Paribas.

== History ==
In 2002, after a period in which the banking sector was almost exclusively state-owned, Algeria began reforms to attract international banks. The French group BNP Paribas was one of the first to establish itself in Algeria within this framework.

Unlike the public banks, which already had an established network, BNP Paribas El Djazaïr had to build its branch network from scratch.

In January 2016, the bank inaugurated its new headquarters.

In 2019, the BNP Paribas group began a divestment process on the African continent, retaining only its investments in Morocco and Algeria, where it strengthened its presence.

At the end of 2025, the group began a divestment process from its Algerian subsidiary.

In April 2026, the PNB Paribas Group announced the sale of its stake in its Moroccan subsidiary, leaving Algeria as its sole presence on the African continent.

== See also ==
- List of banks in Algeria
