= Cetelem =

French company specializing in consumer credit for personal loans

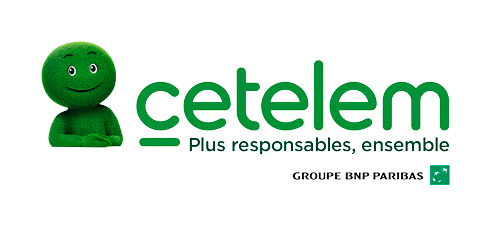
- Company type: Subsidiary
- Industry: Financial services
- Founded: 1953; 73 years ago
- Headquarters: Levallois-Perret, Paris, France
- Area served: Europe, North America, South America, Singapore, Hong Kong, Africa.
- Key people: Laurent David (Chief Executive officer); Alain van Groenendael (Chairman); Jean-Marie Bellafiore (Deputy CEO and Head of France)
- Services: Consumer credit, personal loans, credit cards, car financing
- Number of employees: 19,500 (2017)
- Parent: BNP Paribas
- Website: www.cetelem.fr

Cetelem is a French company specializing in consumer credit for household electrical equipment, personal loans, car loans and credit cards. Cetelem is the commercial brand of BNP Paribas Personal Finance, which is a wholly owned subsidiary of BNP Paribas. The company specializes in retail financing in Europe.

As of 2018, it was established in thirty countries, had 27 million customers with headquarters located in Paris. Cetelem also trades as Modern Credit in the French overseas territories. Other brands of BNP Paribas Personal Finance are Findomestic in Italy and AlphaCredit in Belgium.

== History ==
Cetelem was founded in 1953 by Jacques de Fouchier.

Cetelem merged with UCB at the end of 2007 and became "BNP Paribas Personal Finance".

Since June 2015, Laurent David has been the CEO of BNP Paribas Personal Finance.

== Activities ==
Cetelem has been marketing loans and credits, as well as savings and insurance products, since 2011.

== See also ==
- Compagnie Bancaire
