= BNL BNP Paribas headquarters =

BNL BNP Paribas building in Rome, Italy

- Orizzonte Europa
- Interactive map of the BNL BNP Paribas headquarters area

General information
- Status: Completed
- Type: Office
- Architectural style: Modernism
- Location: Rome, Italy
- Coordinates: 41°54′40″N 12°31′59″E
- Current tenants: BNL-BNP Paribas Group
- Construction started: 2012
- Completed: 2016
- Opened: 2017
- Client: BNL BNP Paribas

Height
- Height: 52.1 m (171 ft)

Technical details
- Floor count: 12

Design and construction
- Architect: 5+1AA Alfonsa Femia Gianluca Peluffo Architects
- Awards: "The Plan 2016" award, best property development for office use.

Other information
- Number of rooms: 3300 work stations
- Parking: 4 floors

Website
- Orizzonte Europa

BNL BNP Paribas headquarters (2016), also known as Orizzonte Europa, is an office building in Rome. It was designed in a contemporary all-glass style by Alfonso Femia and Gianluca Peluffo. The building has a LEED certification for its energy efficiency. The most unique feature about the building is that it is tall and thin with a glass facade that protrudes at angles. The structure was built for the BNL-BNP Paribas Group, which is Italy's sixth-largest bank.

From January 2024, a few floors of the building are occupied by the offices of Ferrovie dello Stato Italiane.

== Design ==
The structure is built near the Roma Tiburtina railway station. It has an area of 75,000 m^{2} (810,000 sq ft) and it is a thin, tall structure made of glass. The building is 16 stories tall with 12 stories above ground and four below ground. The facade of the building has glass which is positioned at alternating angles. The builders refer to the glass protrusions as following the principle of the "Two-faced Janus". The unique appearance also helps to ventilate the building. There are ventilation areas in parts of the façade which are ceramic.

There is 15,000 m^{2} (160,000 sq ft) of window surface, the alternating angles are referred to as a sinusoidal pattern. This gives the surface area three dimensions. These cause the light from the Sun to reflect at angles. Because of the natural lighting, the building uses 30% less energy and has a LEED certification from the Green Building Certification Institute.

== Amenities ==
The building has a health clinic, a restaurant, a school for kindergarteners and a gym. It also has an auditorium and a catering area that seats 700. There are four stories of underground parking.

== Awards ==
- "The Plan 2016" award, best property development for office use.
