= Consorsbank =

German bank brand of BNP Paribas

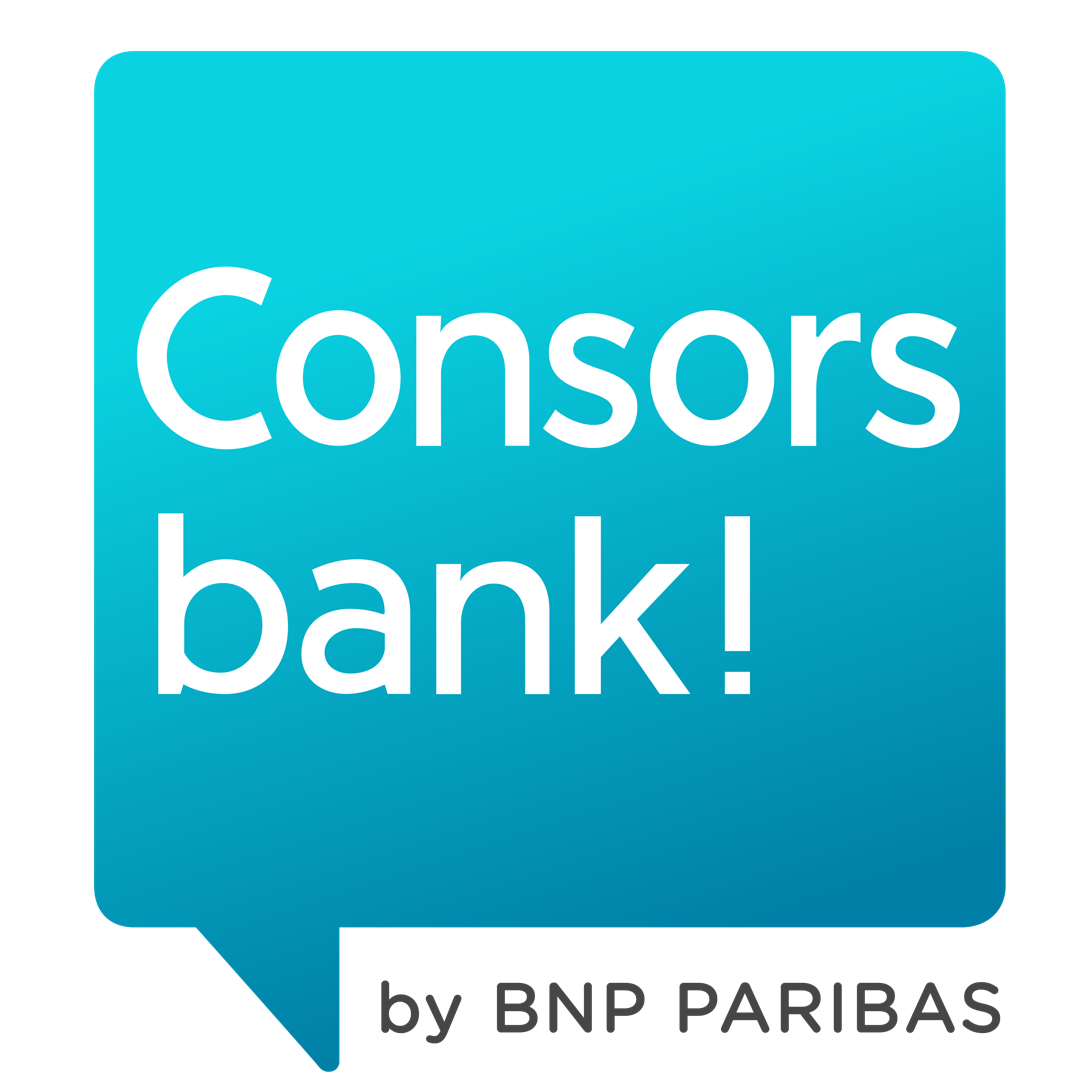
- Current owner: BNP Paribas S.A. Niederlassung Deutschland
- Country: Germany
- Introduced: December 2014
- Markets: Bank; Insurance
- Website: www.consorsbank.de/home

Consorsbank is a brand of BNP Paribas S.A. Niederlassung Deutschland with its seat in Nürnberg.

== Activities ==
As a direct bank, Consorsbank offers its full range of products online.

They include a current account, which can be combined with a Girocard (including V PAY functionality). Customers can also choose between three additional card options: a free Visa Debit card, a free "Visa Card Gold Light" credit card, or a fee-based "Visa Card Gold" credit card. Both credit card versions offer free ATM withdrawals and payments worldwide, while the fee-based Gold card additionally includes benefits such as mobile phone and travel insurance.

Consorsbank's saving products include a money market account, saving plans and time deposits.

Additionally Consorsbank offers an online trading platform that lets them trade on financial products from various global markets.

== History ==
In December 2014 Cortal Consors Germany was rebranded as Consorsbank. In November 2016 it absorbed DAB Bank that BNP Paribas had acquired in 2014 with all customer accounts being transferred to Consorsbank.

== See also ==
- List of banks in Germany
