= Banca Nazionale del Lavoro =

Italian bank

Banca Nazionale del Lavoro S.p.A.

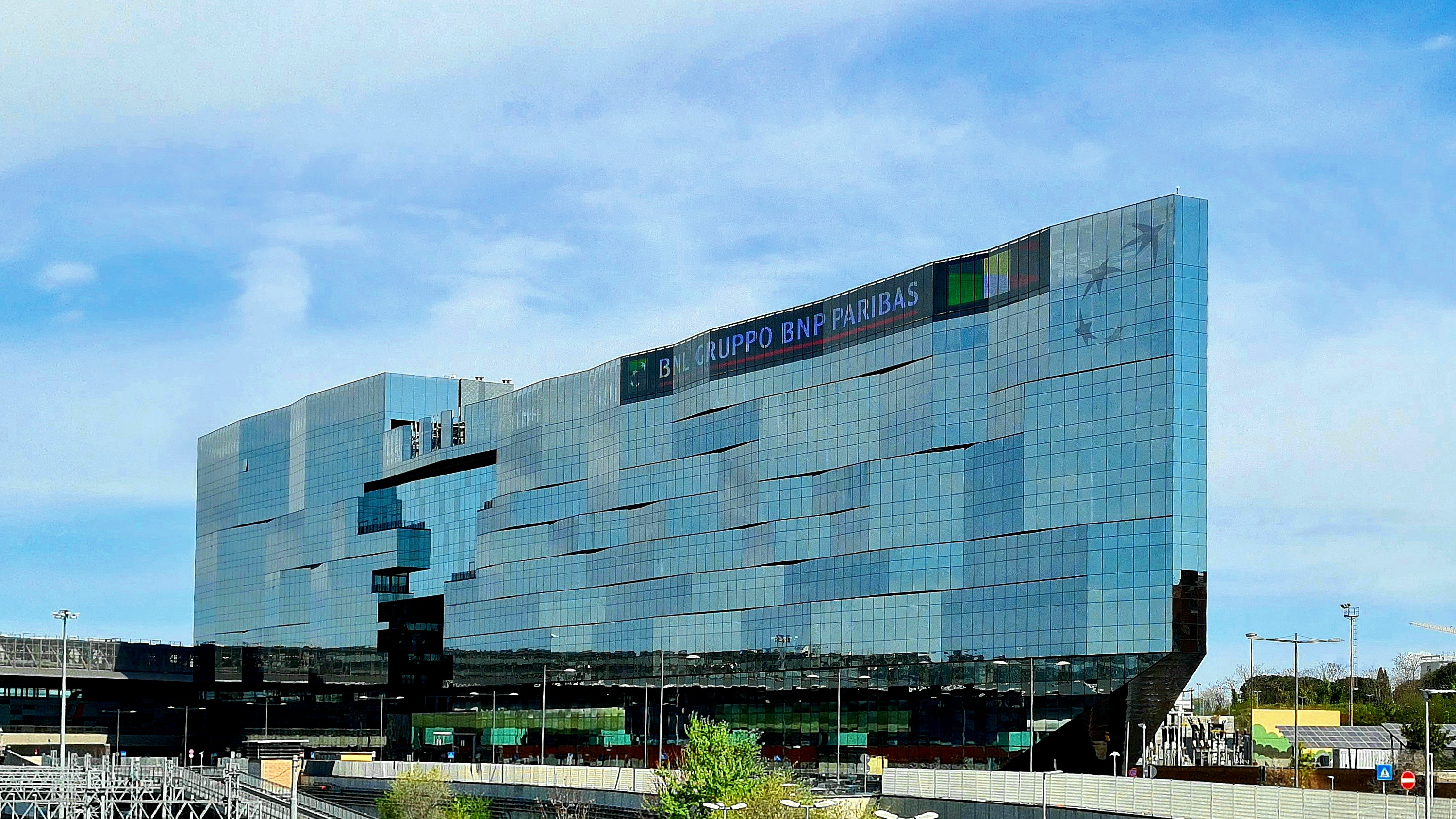
- Orizzonte Europa, BNL headquarters in Rome
- Company type: Subsidiary
- Industry: Banking and financial services
- Founded: 1913; 113 years ago (as Istituto Nazionale di Credito per la Cooperazione)
- Founder: Government of Italy
- Headquarters: Rome, Italy
- Key people: Claudia Cattani (Chairwoman); Elena Goitini (CEO)
- Net income: €163 million (2023)
- Number of employees: 11,307 (2021)
- Parent: BNP Paribas
- Subsidiaries: Artigiancassa (Banca Agevolarti)
- Website: Official website

Banca Nazionale del Lavoro S.p.A. (BNL), commonly known as BNL BNP Paribas, is an Italian bank headquartered in Rome. Established in 1913, the bank has been a subsidiary of BNP Paribas since 2006. Integration process was concluded in 2008, BNL with its group oversees the commercial banking activity of BNP Paribas in Italy.

== History ==
=== Istituto Nazionale di Credito per la Cooperazione (1913–1929) ===
Founded in 1913 by royal decree, under the influence of Luigi Luzzatti, the Istituto was intended to provide cooperative workers’ organizations with credit facilities comparable to commercial banks. It pioneered special credit lines for agriculture, cinema, and fishing sectors in which Italy was undergoing gradual modernization while remaining largely rural.

The bank was initially overseen by the Banca d'Italia under Bonaldo Stringher and funded by public bodies, savings banks, Monte dei Paschi di Siena, Cassa di Previdenza and the Istituto di Credito per le Cooperative of Milan.

Its mission included financing cooperative agricultural, production, and consumption ventures. During WWI it supported war efforts by funding relevant cooperatives. After the March on Rome, the bank underwent political turmoil.

By 1925 it faced insolvency, but through political support from Cremona’s Roberto Farinacci, Catholic syndicalist Arturo Osio became director. Over his nearly 20 year tenure (1925–1942), he stabilized and expanded the institute, aligning it with fascist trade unions and aiding initiatives like the 1926 Prestito del Littorio.

=== Banca Nazionale del Lavoro (1927–1945) ===
Renamed Banca Nazionale del Lavoro e della Cooperazione in 1927, and simply Banca Nazionale del Lavoro in 1929, the bank became a public-credit institution. Its founding financial backers included the Italian Treasury, Bank of Italy, and national social security funds.

Under Osio, BNL fostered the Italian film industry, via a Specialized Credit Section for Cinema (est. 1935), financing nearly 150 films annually with up to 60% of production costs funded. BNL was also the major financier of the E42 complex in Rome, the current area of the Palazzo della Civiltà Italiana and the Palazzo dei Congressi, which was supposed to host the 1942 World’s Fair, but which never took place. The bank also heavily financed the extraction of Carrara marble.

By the onset of the Great Depression, BNL had absorbed eleven faltering Catholic banks and the Banca Agricola Italiana, ranking it as Italy’s largest depositarian bank.

=== WWII and post war reconstruction (1942–1967) ===
In 1942, Alberto d'Agostino replaced Osio briefly. In November 1945, Giuseppe Imbriani Longo, an engineer from Italstrade and IRI, took over and led until 1967. He expanded BNL’s presence in the post war recovery by funding industry, supporting FIAT modernization, the Mezzogiorno’s development, and backing Enrico Mattei in establishing Eni.

Under Imbriani Longo, BNL became Italy’s top bank and 9th worldwide, expanded globally, and led a 1963 cartel among banks to coordinate interest rates.

Following his term, director Alberto Ferrari faced economic strife: inflation, industrial slowdown, and scandals like financier Felice Riva’s collapse and the Lockheed scandal.

=== Restructuring and modern operations (1978–1980s) ===
In 1978, Nerio Nesi became president. In 1981, Treasury Minister Beniamino Andreatta appointed Francesco Bignardi as director general. They restructured BNL via capital increases and founded BNL Holding Italia in 1984, managing around seventy non-banking holdings.

They sponsored the creation of the economic research institute Nomisma (1981), led by Romano Prodi, later President of IRI. Nomisma and Prodi were later embroiled in a controversy over an expensive but publicly useful study commissioned by the Ministry of Foreign Affairs; Bignardi was eventually cleared.

=== Scandals: Atlanta & Federconsorzi (1980s–1990s) ===
In the late 1980s, the so called Atlanta scandal erupted when BNL Atlanta’s director, Christopher Drogoul, extended over US$2 billion in unauthorized loans to Iraq, violating US law.

In 1991, financing to Federconsorzi via Agrifactoring led to 910 billion Italian lira in non-performing exposure. The crisis triggered international demands under cross default clauses. The Italian Treasury negotiated a resolution involving subordinate claims within bankruptcy proceedings.

=== Privatization and stock listing (1992–1998) ===
In 1992, BNL was transformed into a joint stock company and began privatization, culminating with its 1998 debut on the Milan Stock Exchange, ending the era of “State banker.”

=== Bancopoli and BNP Paribas acquisition (2005–2008) ===
During Italy’s 2005 Bancopoli crisis, Spain’s BBVA launched a takeover bid for BNL but was blocked. Unipol’s attempted buyout in 2006 was rejected due to capital adequacy concerns.

On 3 February 2006, Unipol sold its shares in BNL to BNP Paribas, which acquired a 48 % stake and launched a full takeover. BBVA contributed its shares. The bid was supported by then president Luigi Abete. Jean Laurent Bonnafé became CEO and Mario Girotti Director General. Integration was planned across five territorial divisions and completed six months early, by early 2008.

BNP Paribas updated the logo, introducing red alongside green and white, and replacing stars with a swallow.

Between 2008 2009, over 700 branches were renovated or opened. BNP Paribas then acquired Belgian Fortis (2008) and Italian Findomestic (2010). In 2011 BNL joined the capital of PerMicro, a leading micro credit operator.

=== Centenary and recent leadership (2013–present) ===
BNL celebrated its 100th anniversary in 2013 with a specially commissioned logo and an advertisement aired during the Sanremo Music Festival, directed by Emanuele Crialese, themed around “Italy speaking through work.”

In April 2021, Elena Goitini became CEO, the first woman to hold that post in a major Italian bank, and Italy head for BNP Paribas. Andrea Munari, CEO since 2015, became Chairman, replacing Luigi Abete. On 19 July 2023 Claudia Cattani was appointed Chairwoman, making BNL the first major Italian bank led by two women.

Banca Nazionale del Lavoro began its operations in Argentina in 1960, eventually opening 91 branches. The bank sold its Argentine business to HSBC Bank Argentina in 2006.

In 2016 the company opened a contemporary all glass building for its headquarters: BNL BNP Paribas headquarters.

== Scandals ==
The bank was involved in a major political scandal (dubbed Iraqgate by the media) when it was revealed in 1989 that the Atlanta, Georgia, branch of the bank was making unauthorized loans of more than US$4.5 billion to Iraq. Many of the loans that the branch made were guaranteed by the United States Department of Agriculture's Commodity Credit Corporation program. The loans were originally intended to finance agricultural exports to Iraq, but were diverted by Iraq to buy weapons. The branch manager, Christopher Drogoul, indicated that the bank's headquarters office was aware of these loans, but senior bank official denied this. Drogoul pleaded guilty to three felony charges and served 33 months in federal prison.

== Ownership in 2004 ==
At the year end of 2004 the major shareholders with more than 2% were:

1. BBVA 14.75190%
2. Assicurazioni Generali 8.71980%
3. Diego Della Valle (Dorint Holding S.A.) 4.99436%
4. Stefano Ricucci Trust (Magiste International S.A.) 4.98985%
5. Francesco Gaetano Caltagirone 4.96904%
6. Danilo Coppola (PACOP SpA) 4.92611%
7. Banca Monte dei Paschi di Siena 4.41788%
8. Giuseppe Statuto (Michele Amari Srl) 4.09248%
9. Banca Popolare di Vicenza 3.63682%
10. Vito Bonsignore (Gefip Holding SpA) 3.07572%

After a short period of Unipol minority ownership as well as the exposed bancopoli scandal, BNP Paribas signed an agreement with 13 shareholders of BNL, representing 48% shares of BNL on 6 February 2006. BNP Paribas also made offer to buy all the remain shares from the public and delisted the company from Borsa Italiana. MPS sold the shares to Deutsche Bank instead.

== The Futsal Team ==
In 1987, the bank founded a futsal team (registered with FIGC under number 77,855), which made a lasting impact on the sport throughout the 1990s. Between 1992 and 1999, the team set a record by reaching eight consecutive national championship finals, winning four titles.

In 1996, under the guidance of Piero Gialli, who coached the team throughout the decade, BNL won the European Champions Tournament, becoming the second Italian team to win the prestigious competition, after the success of RCB Roma in 1990.

By 2004, the team had become independent from the bank and merged with Roma RCB, creating Roma Calcio a 5, thus marking the end of the original BNL team.

== Sponsorships ==
BNL is the main sponsor of the Internazionali BNL d'Italia, also known as the Italian Open, one of the most important international tennis tournaments held annually in Rome.

== Gallery ==
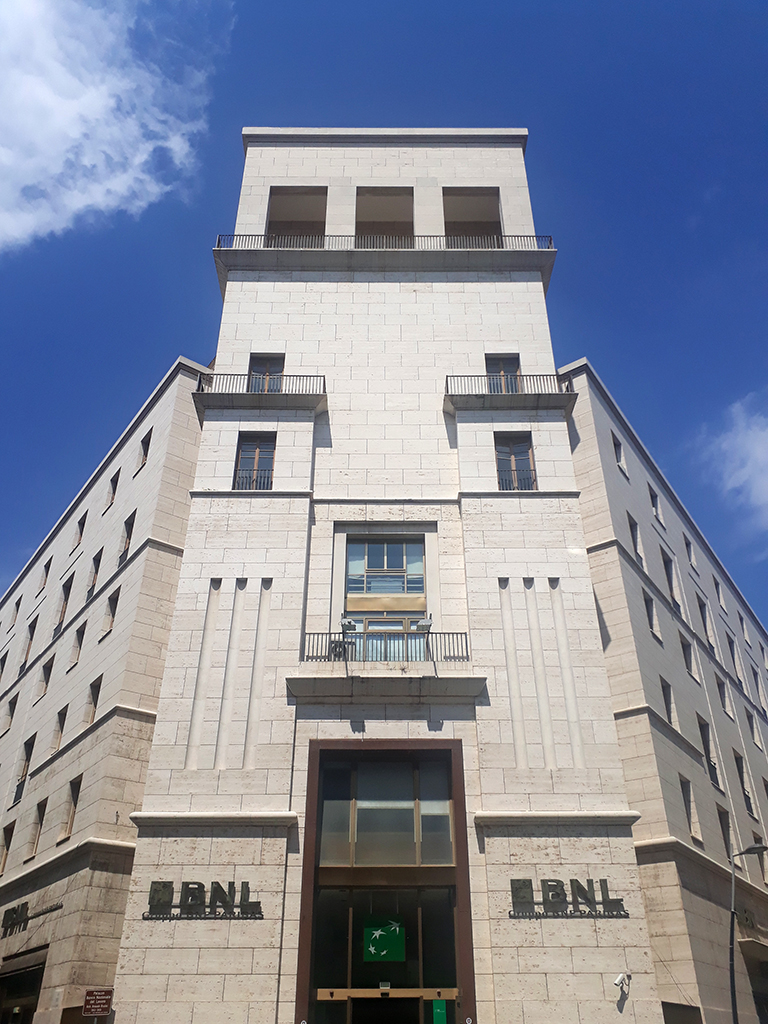
BNL building in Naples

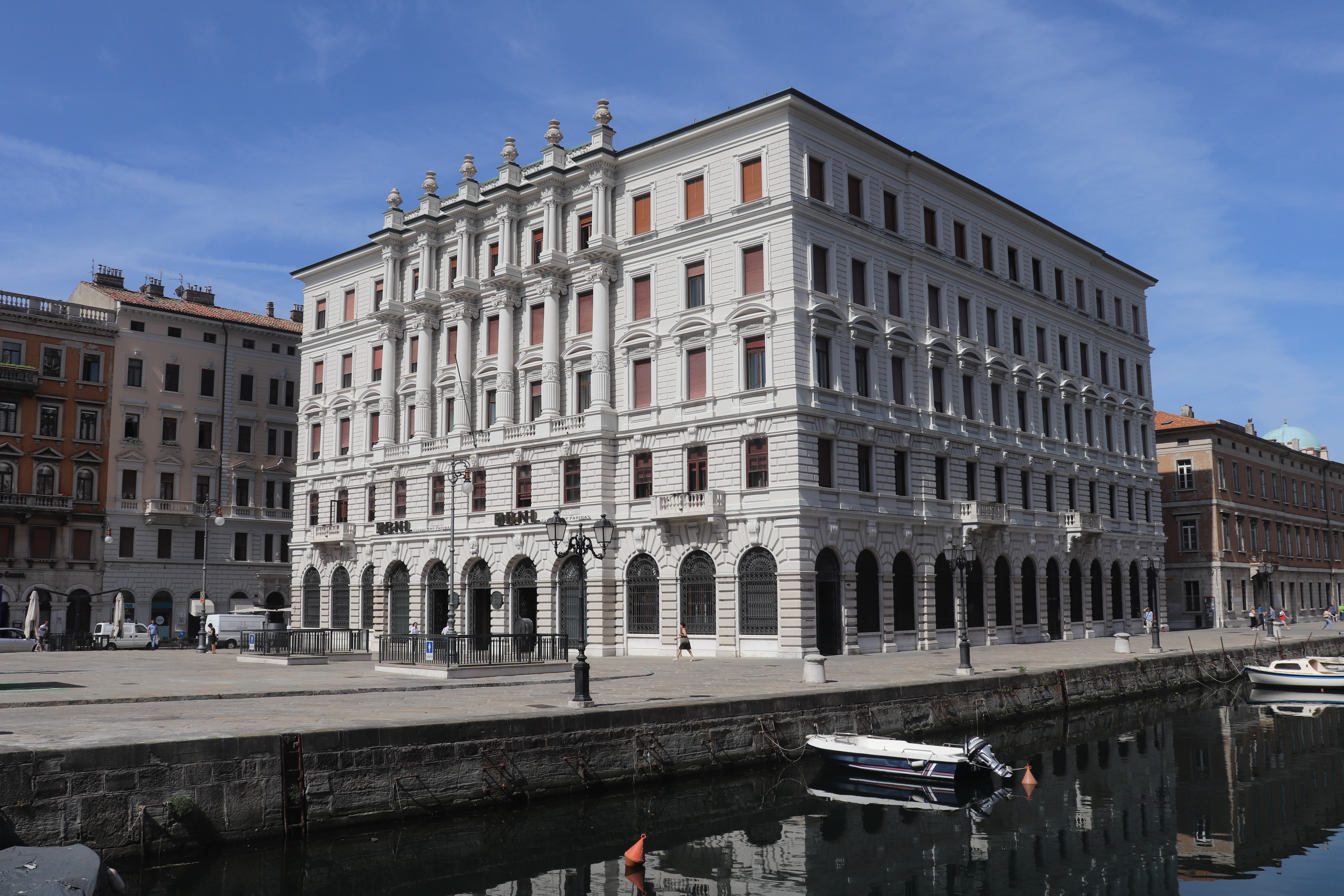
BNL building in Trieste

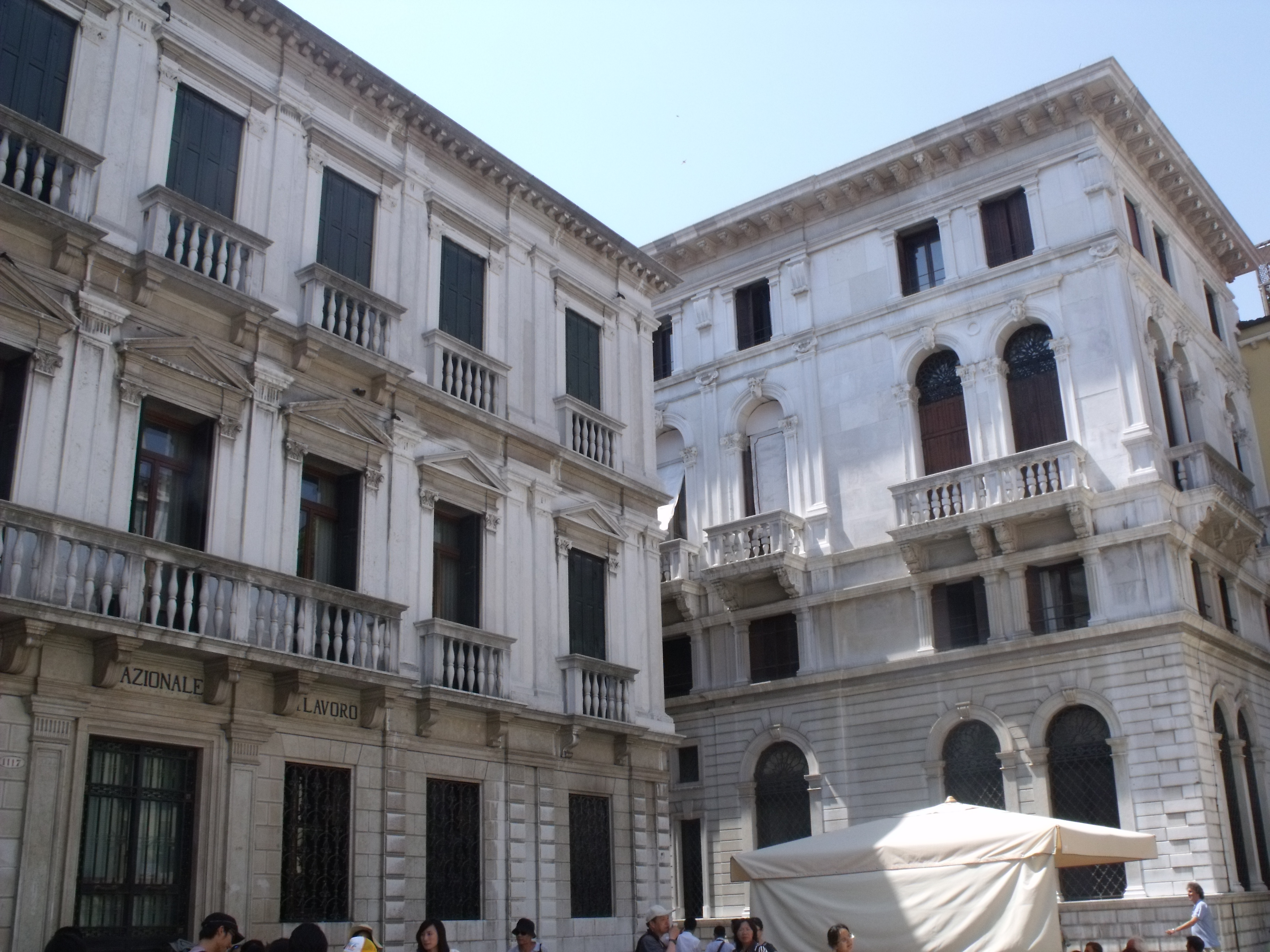
BNL building in Venice

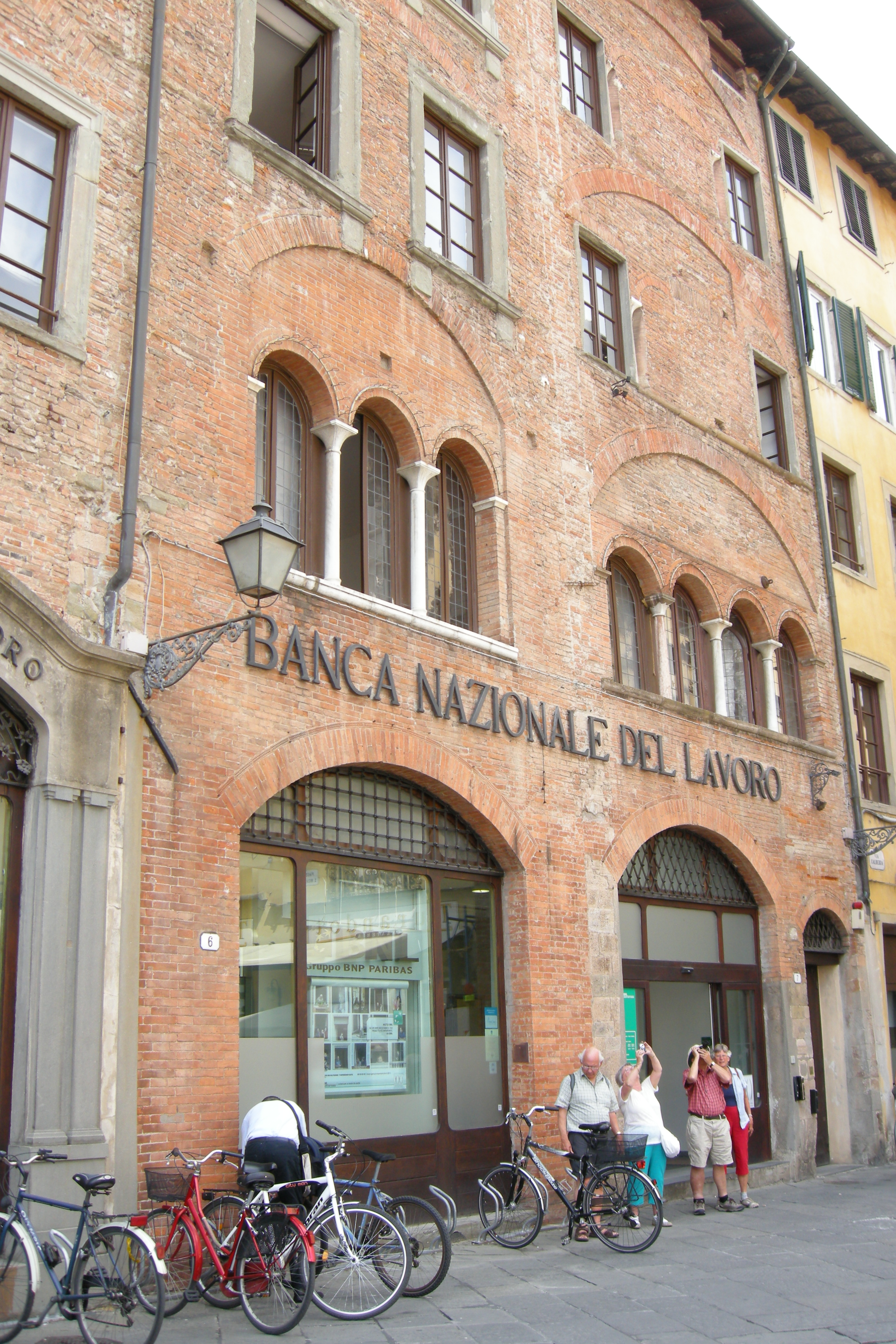
BNL building in Lucca

== See also ==
- BNP Paribas
- List of banks in Italy
- Bancopoli
- Saving and loan scandal
- Bank of Credit and Commerce International
