= CGER =

CGER may refer to:

- ASLK/CGER, a former Belgian bank
- Combined gross enrolment ratio
