= Argenta (bank) =

Bank based in Belgium

- Logo of Argenta-branch in Waremme, Belgium
- Type: Naamloze vennootschap
- Industry: Financial services
- Founded: 1956
- Headquarters: Antwerp, Belgium
- Products: Banking and insurance
- Net income: €357 million (2025)
- Number of employees: 2700 (end 2025)
- Website: argenta.be

Argenta is a bank based in Antwerp, Belgium that also operates in the Netherlands and Luxembourg. It was Belgium's fifth-biggest bank in 2020, after BNP Paribas Fortis, KBC Group, Belfius and ING Group.

Argenta has been designated as a Significant Institution since the entry into force of European Banking Supervision in late 2014, and as a consequence is directly supervised by the European Central Bank.

== History ==
The Argenta Group has been active in Belgium since 1956, in the Netherlands since 1989 and in Luxemburg since 1990.

In 2001, Argenta acquired the branch network and brand name of the Office Central de Crédit Hypothécaire, a public financial institution that had been created in 1936 to support mortgage credit.

== Group structure ==
Investeringsmaatschappij Argenta N.V. (abbreviated, Investar N.V.), a mixed financial holding of the Van Rompuy family, holds 87.56% of the shares in the parent, with the remainder of the shares owned by Argenta Coöperatieve C.V. (abbreviated, Argen-Co C.V.), which is a recognised cooperative undertaking in accordance with the Act of 20 July 1955 on a National Council for Cooperatives. Argenta Bank- en Verzekeringsgroep N.V. is the holding company of the Argenta Group. Argenta Bank- en Verzekeringsgroep N.V. is a mixed financial holding within the meaning of article 3, 39° of the Banking Act.

Argenta Spaarbank N.V. has one subsidiary, Argenta Asset Management S.A., a Luxembourg company which is responsible for the management and central administration of the Argenta Group's collective investment undertakings, i.e. Argenta Fund SICAV and Argenta Fund of Funds SICAV, which are open-end investment undertakings under Luxembourg law. The latter is a fund of funds (also known as an umbrella fund). This means that the assets of various sub-funds are invested in other collective investment undertakings. This company has its own subsidiary in Luxembourg, Arvestar Asset Management S.A. In addition, Argenta Spaarbank N.V. has a branch office in the Netherlands of the same name.

Argenta Assuranties N.V. is a duly licensed Belgian insurance undertaking. It has one subsidiary, Argenta-Life Nederland N.V., an insurance undertaking organized under the laws of the Netherlands. It offers term life insurance linked to housing loans. It also manages a portfolio of mortgage insurance policies.

== Operations ==
All group activities exclusively consist of financial activities for families and individual clients relating to attracting savings, granting loans, distribution of collective investments and offering life and non-life insurance products.

== See also ==
- List of banks in the euro area
- List of banks in Belgium
