= Crédit Communal de Belgique =

Former Belgian bank

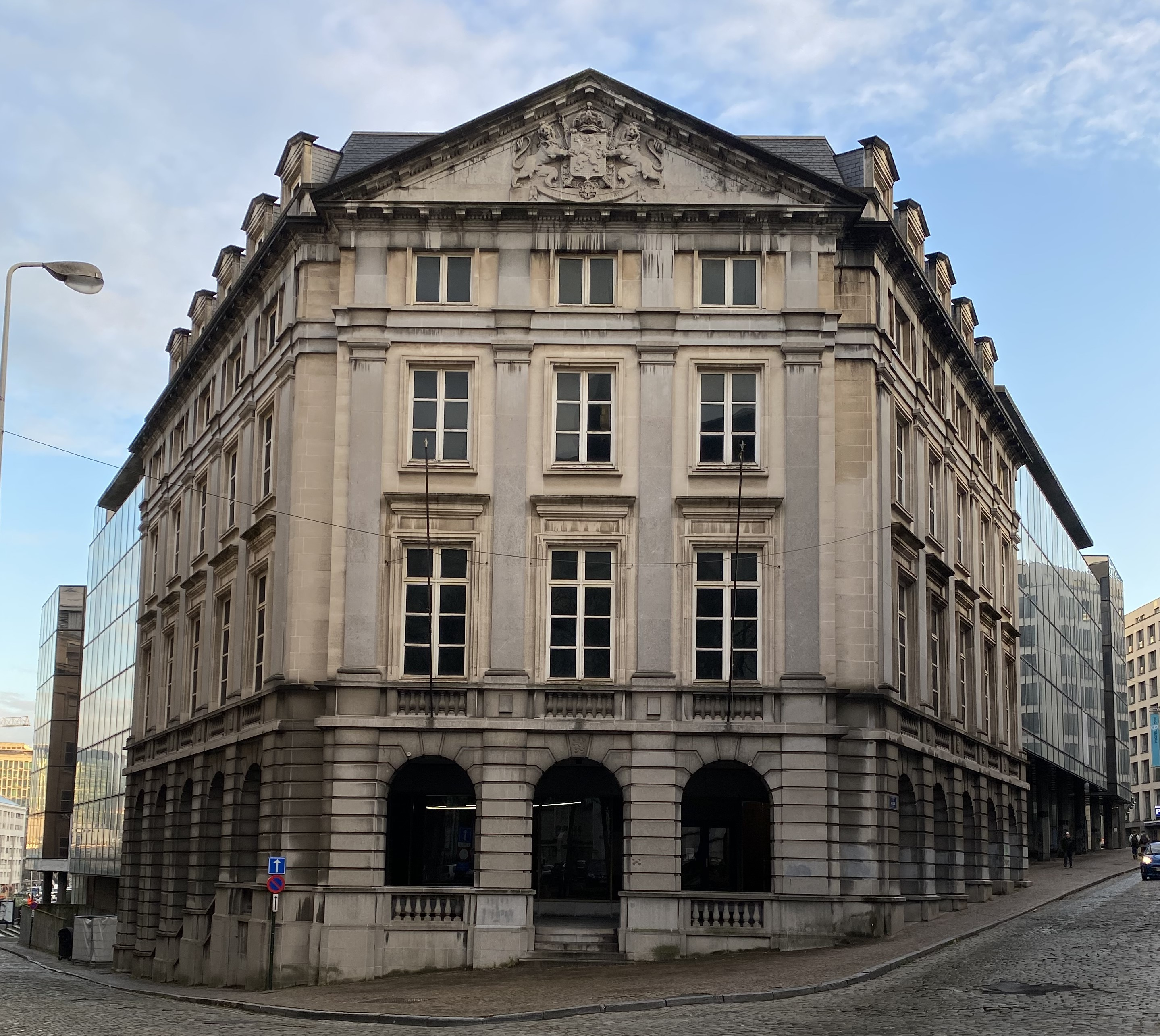
- Former head office of the Crédit Communal de Belgique, at the corner of rue de Ligne and rue de la Banque in Brussels
- Company type: Naamloze vennootschap
- Industry: Financial services
- Founded: November 24, 1860
- Founder: Walthère Frère-Orban Belgium Finance Minister
- Defunct: 1996
- Fate: Merged
- Successor: Dexia
- Headquarters: Brussels, Belgium
- Products: Banking services

The Crédit Communal de Belgique (Dutch: Gemeentekrediet van België, lit. 'Municipal Credit of Belgium') was a Belgian financial institution, established in 1860 and eventually merged with Crédit Local de France in 1996 to form Dexia. By the mid-1990s, it was the second-largest Belgian bank by total assets (behind the Générale de Banque) and the largest one by deposits.

== History ==
=== Early years ===
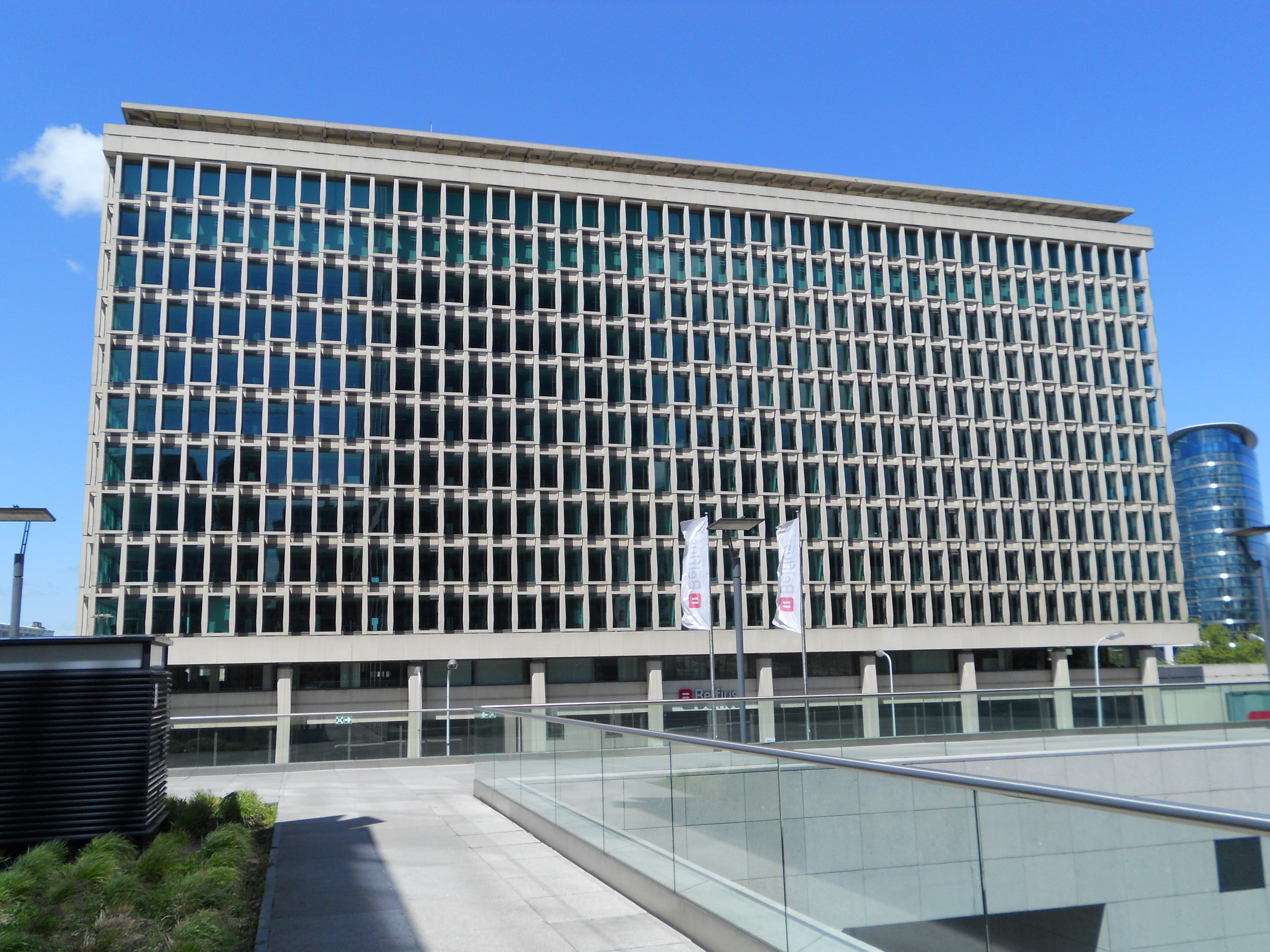
Former Crédit Communal building at Boulevard Pachéco 44 in Brussels, erected 1965–1969, lately offices of the Belgian Interior Ministry

The Crédit Communal de Belgique was created in 1860 on the initiative of Walthère Frère-Orban, taking advice from statesman Henri de Brouckère and financier Jonathan-Raphaël Bischoffsheim. The aim was to grant credit to municipalities for their investments, for which the bank was established in the form of a cooperative, namely a public limited company owned by Belgian municipalities. Municipalities that wanted to borrow from it had to subscribe to shares for at least 5% of the amount of their loan, thus gradually establishing a proper capital base for the bank. The Crédit Communal's founding act was made by lawmaker Auguste Orts and Jacques Gillon, the mayor of Saint-Josse-ten-Noode, on 24 November 1860, and endorsed by royal decree on 8 December 1860. The initial board of directors was composed of Bischoffsheim, de Brouckère, Gillon, Orts, and Krekelinger (a government official), the same five individuals who had drafted the bank's statute.

In 1878, the Crédit Communal established its head office at the corner of rue de Ligne and rue de la Banque in central Brussels, next to the then newly finished building of the National Bank of Belgium. That building was eventually demolished and replaced in the 1970s by a complex designed by prominent architect Marcel Lambrichs, presenting a neoclassical stone-faced front towards the National Bank and modern curtain-wall façades on the other sides.

The contribution of the Crédit Communal to the financing of Belgian municipalities rose over time. In the period 1860–1913, it contributed less than 20 percent of the aggregate amount borrowed; between 1914 and 1940, that share rose to more than 70 percent, eventually reaching 90 to 95 percent in the 1990s.

In 1947, the Crédit Communal developed a network of local offices to collect savings directly from the public. In 1960, the network was upgraded with the aim of diversifying operations and building loyalty among retail customers, by expanding the range of products and services. In 1973, its statute was amended to allow for provision of consumer loans and mortgages to its retail customer base.

Since its founding, the Crédit Communal had special status among joint-stock companies, because of its public-sector shareholding structure but also with special provisions in its statute granting governance rights to the national government. Its public-sector status was further articulated by legislation of 16 April 1963 that placed it under the joint oversight of the Finance Ministry and Interior Ministry. In 1983, following an infringement case lost by Belgium before the European Court of Justice, the Crédit Communal was brought into the scope of prudential supervision by the Belgian Banking Commission. In 1984 and 1985, two successive rulings of the Council of State clarified its identity as an administrative authority despite its private-sector legal form.

By the mid-1990s the Crédit Communal relied on nearly a thousand branches in Belgium managed by 1,230 local agents (French: mandataires) which were either individuals or corporate entities, employing a total 1,970 staff.

=== International expansion - 1990s ===
In 1990, the Crédit Communal began an international banking expansion with the creation of Cregem International Bank in Luxembourg, specializing in wealth management. In 1991, the bank continued its international expansion by taking 25 percent of the share capital of Banque Internationale à Luxembourg (BIL), by then the leading bank in the Grand Duchy. At the beginning of 1992, Crédit Communal increased its stake in BIL to 51 percent. By the mid-1990s, BIL represented about a quarter of the Credit Communal's activity.

=== Merger into Dexia ===
From the late 1980s, a number of projects were considered to consolidate the Belgian banking sector, involving the Crédit Communal. The government coalition agreement of 8 May 1988 foresaw a combination of public-sector banks, resulting in legislation of 17 June 1991 that mandated the integration of the Crédit Communal, Société Nationale de Crédit à l'Industrie, and Office Central de Crédit Hypothécaire. The Crédit Communal, however, ensured that these provisions were not implemented. In 1995, a project of merging the Crédit Communal with the Générale de Banque and Bank Brussels Lambert failed to materialize, largely because of the specificity of the Crédit Communal's shareholding structure.

Following these episodes, in late 1995 the Crédit Communal's CEO François Narmon initiated contacts with France's state-owned Crédit Local de France, emulating the bilateral holding structure that had been created a few years earlier for the creation of Fortis Group. The option of adding Bank Nederlandse Gemeenten as additional Dutch partner was considered but eventually not retained. The merger was eventually approved by the respective general shareholders' meetings of CLF and CCB on 9 October 1996 and 14 October 1996.

== See also ==
- Bank Nederlandse Gemeenten
- Kuntarahoitus
- SFIL
- Landesbank
- List of banks in Belgium
