= Kuntarahoitus =

Public bank in Finland

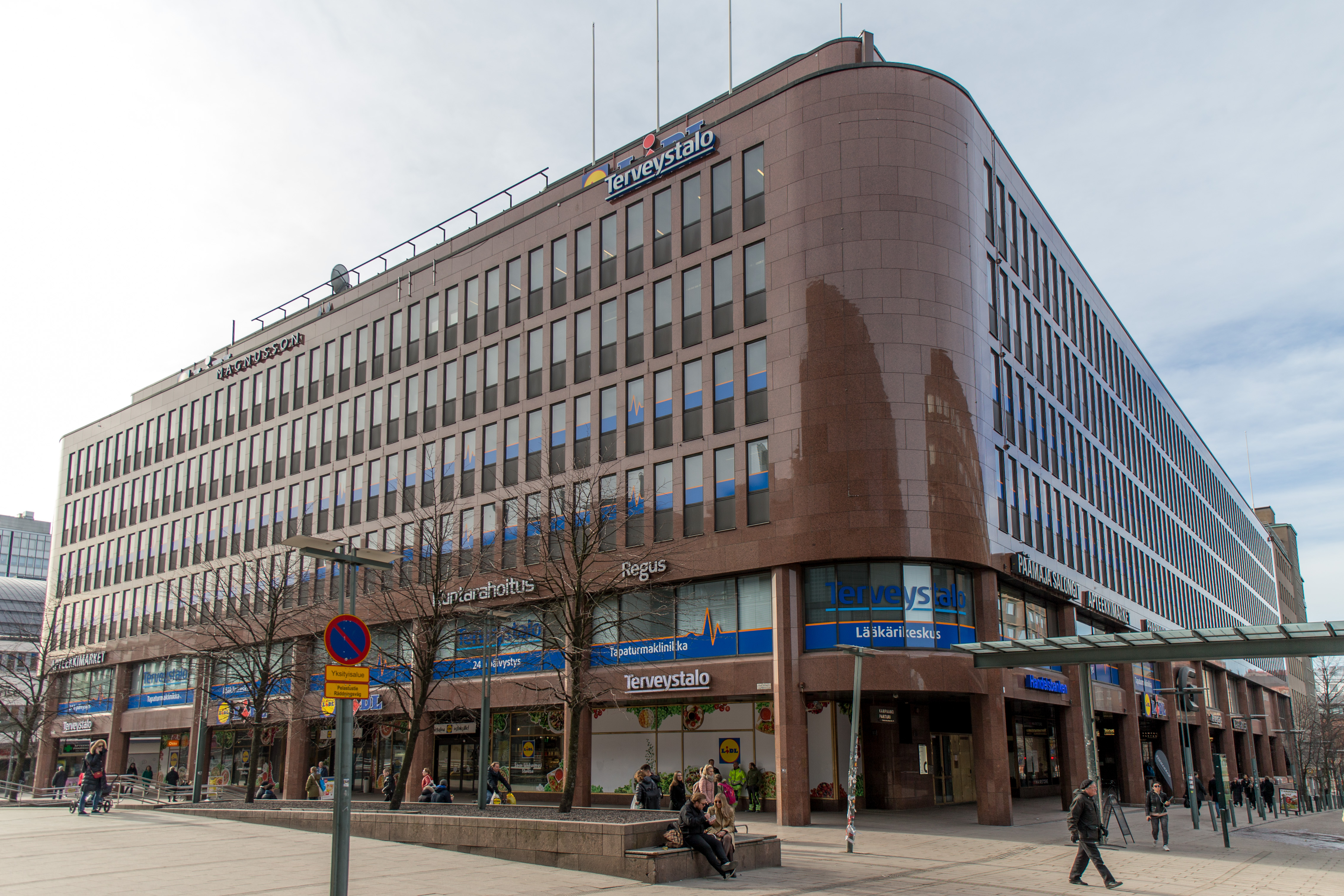
Head office of Kuntarahoitus in Helsinki

Kuntarahoitus Oyj, variously branded Municipal Finance or Municipality Finance or MuniFin in English, is a public financial institution in Finland and the country's third-largest credit institution by total assets, behind Nordea and OP.

Kuntarahoitus plays a central role in financing local government in Finland. It is the first Finnish green and social bond issuer. Its customers are Finnish municipalities, municipal associations, municipal-owned enterprises, and public-benefit housing companies that engage in state-supported social housing production and are approved by the Housing Finance and Development Centre of Finland (ARA). As of end-2022, it had €48 billion in total assets.

Kuntarahoitus has been a member of the United Nations Global Compact since October 2020.

== Overview ==
Kuntarahoitus was established in 2001 by merger of two predecessor entities, the so-called the old Kuntarahoitus Oy (est. 1990) and Kuntien Asuntoluotto Oyj. As of the mid-2010s, it financed around 80 percent of municipal debt in Finland.

In late 2015, Kuntarahoitus has been designated as a Significant Institution under European Banking Supervision, and has been subsequently supervised by the European Central Bank.

Kuntarahoitus has approximately 284 shareholders, including municipalities (53 percent in aggregate), the national pension agency Keva (31 percent), and the Finnish government (16 percent). It is mainly funded by securities issuance, for which it benefits from the same rating as the Finnish government thanks to a guarantee provided by the Municipal Guarantee Board (MGB, Finnish: Kuntien Takauskeskus).

In both 2021 and 2022, Kuntarahoitus won the municipality green bond of the year award from Environmental Finance, a specialized publication.

== See also ==
- Bank Nederlandse Gemeenten
- Crédit Communal de Belgique
- SFIL
- List of banks in the euro area
- List of banks in Finland
