= Crelan =

Belgian banking and insurance company

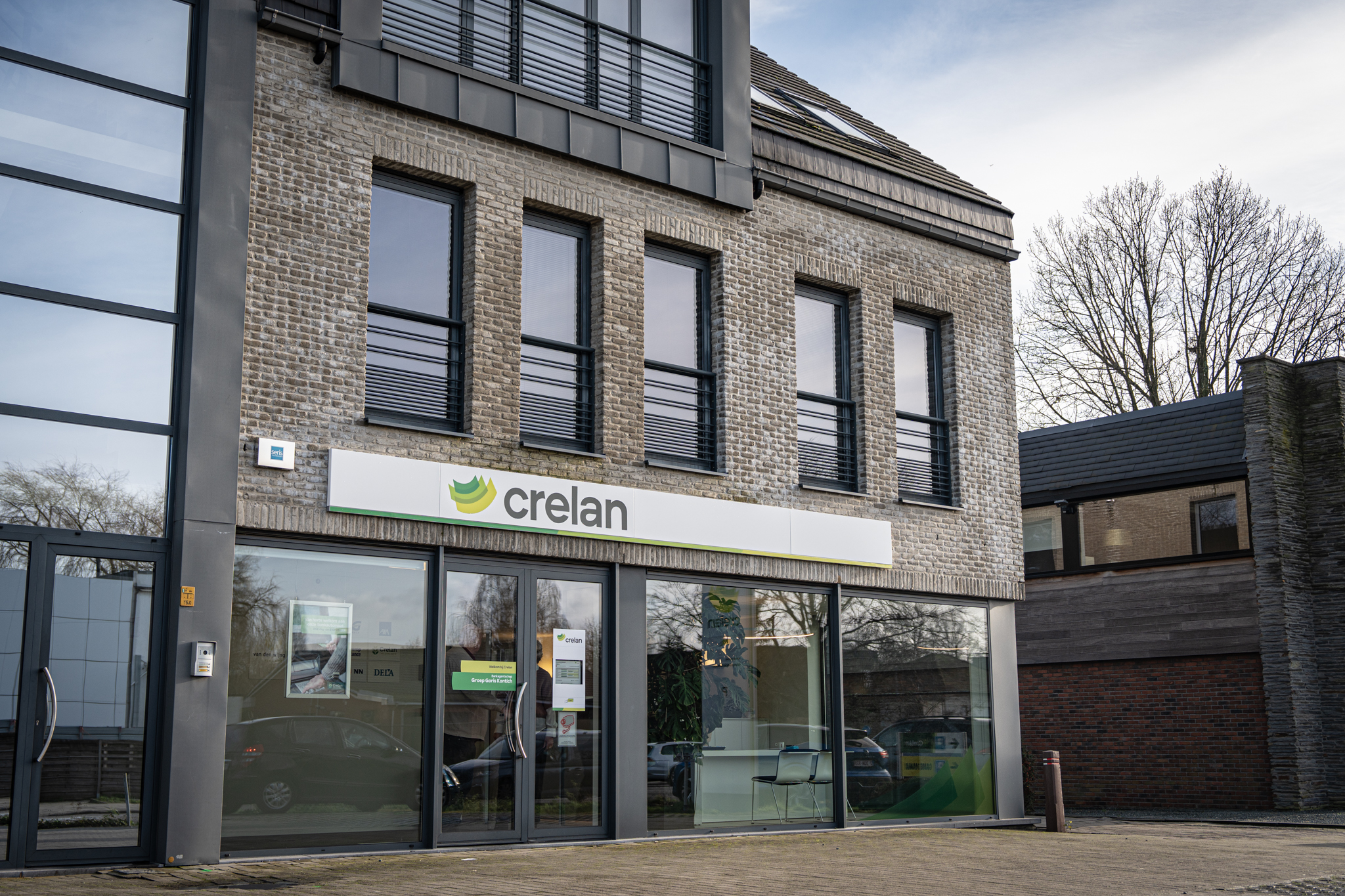
- One Crelan
- Industry: Financial services
- Predecessors: Landbouwkrediet/Crédit Agricole and Centea
- Founded: 1937; 89 years ago as Landbouwkrediet, merged in 2013
- Headquarters: Brussels, Belgium
- Area served: Belgium
- Key people: Philippe Voisin (CEO)
- Products: Banking services
- Net income: €192.3 million (2024)
- Total assets: €56.671 bilion (Q2 2025)
- Owner: 296.751 cooperative shareholders (december 2024)
- Number of employees: 4,327 including branches (december 2024)
- Subsidiaries: Europabank
- Website: www.crelan.be

Crelan is a cooperative bank with its roots in Belgium and in agricultural lending. The bank is a universal bank providing services throughout Belgium. The bank and brand were established after the merger of Landbouwkrediet / Crédit Agricole and Centea in 2013.

== Overview of key milestones ==
- 1937-1980: Origins in agricultural credit; expansion of cooperative model.
- 1993-1999: Start of privatisation and modernisation with new shareholders.
- 2000-2012: Growth via acquisitions of Europabank, Keytrade and Centea, among others; expansion of insurance offering.
- 2013-2014: Merger of Landbouwkrediet and Centea to form Crelan; digital innovation via mobile app.
- 2015-2016: Crelan becomes fully Belgian and cooperative; sale of Keytrade Bank.
- 2017: Strengthening agricultural innovation and nomination of Philippe Voisin as CEO.
- 2018: Establishment of the CrelanCo Foundation for social projects.
- 2019: Strategic restructuring with creation of CrelanCo; announcement of AXA Bank acquisition.
- 2020: Strong agility during corona crisis; start of “New Way of Working”.
- 2021-2024: Integration of AXA Bank Belgium; Crelan among the top five Belgian retail banks.
- 2025: Strategic partnership with Crédit Agricole in private banking, leasing and asset management.

== History ==
In May 2025, Crédit Agricole announced the acquisition of a 9.9% minority stake in Crelan.

1937-1980: From parastatal institution to cooperative model

Crelan's roots lie in 1937, with the creation of the National Institute for Agricultural Credit (NILK), intended to provide financial support to the agricultural sector after the 1929 crisis. In the 1960s, cooperative operation emerges with Lanbokas and Scopeca, and the product range is systematically expanded. The 1980s bring economic challenges, but also a successful restructuring led by Luc Versele and Albert Huygens.

1993-1999: Privatisation and modernisation

The 1990s mark the beginning of Landbouwkrediet's privatisation. In 1993, the cooperative greenhouses become co-shareholders, followed by Swiss Life and Bacob. In 1998, the bank moves to its new headquarters in Anderlecht, a symbolic step in its modernisation.

2000-2012: Strong growth through acquisitions and diversification

Landbouwkrediet (the predecessor of Crelan) grows strongly thanks to the acquisitions of Europabank (2004), Keytrade Bank (2005) and clients of Kaupthing Bank Belgium (2009). The creation of Landbouwkrediet Verzekeringen (2007) is an important addition to the banking offering. In 2011, Centea is acquired, a step that prepares for the later merger. The bank also shows its sporting commitment through sponsorship of the Borlée family and Belgian athletics.

2013-2014: The birth of Crelan and digital innovation

On 1 April 2013, Landbouwkrediet and Centea merge to form Crelan. The new bank immediately gains a place among the top ten Belgian banks. 2014 sees the launch of the Crelan Mobile App, which is a major step in the digitalisation of services. The collaboration with UGent through the Crelan Chair supports innovative agriculture.

2016-2015: Back to the core - cooperative and Belgian

In 2016, Crelan sells Keytrade Bank and concludes an agreement with Fidea for the distribution of non-life and life insurance. In 2015, Crelan becomes fully Belgian and cooperative: CrelanCo cv becomes the sole shareholder. This creates a transparent and simplified organisational structure.

2017: Leadership and innovation in agriculture

Crelan strengthens its role in the world of agriculture with a Chair at the University of Liège (Gembloux) and a partnership with crowdfunding platform MiiMOSA. On 27 April, Philippe Voisin is named CEO, succeeding Luc Versele.

2018: Establishment of CrelanCo Foundation

With the launch of the CrelanCo Foundation, Crelan shapes its social commitment. The foundation supports sustainable projects nominated by cooperative shareholders. In the same year, the life insurance offering is expanded thanks to a partnership with Allianz.

2019: Strategic sponsorship and restructuring

2019 is marked by strategic realignment. The Federatie van de Kassen van het Landbouwkrediet will be dissolved; its tasks will be taken up by CrelanCo, the bank's cooperative core. Crelan also becomes visible on the sports field: as main sponsor of the Belgian national basketball teams and as partner of the IKO-Crelan cyclo-cross team. In October, the acquisition of AXA Bank Belgium will be announced, along with a distribution agreement for AXA insurance through Crelan's branch network.

2020: Agility in times of crisis and focus on wellbeing

In full coronacrisis, Crelan switches at lightning speed to full home working in early 2020. The bank succeeds in guaranteeing its service to customers and the safety of employees. This forms the basis for the “New Way of Working” project, which aims for more flexibility, autonomy and well-being at work. For the fifth year in a row, Crelan receives the Top Employer label.

In 2019, Crelan announced its intention to acquire AXA Bank Belgium, the Belgian banking business of French insurer AXA, for 620 million euros ($688.51 million). The acquisition, was completed in December 2021 making Crelan Belgium's fifth-largest lender.

2021-2024: Merger with AXA Bank Belgium - economies of scale and growth

The acquisition of AXA Bank Belgium by Group Crelan was successfully completed on 31 December 2021, following approval by the European Central Bank. Since then, both banks have been working towards full integration, with the planned legal merger in spring 2024. This move places Crelan among the top five Belgian retail banks. Since 2021, Crelan customers have also had access to AXA's extensive non-life insurance offering. At the same time, Crelan Insurance was transferred to AXA Belgium. The merger between Crelan and AXA Bank Belgium was completed on 10 June 2024.

2025: Strategic partnership with Crédit Agricole

In May 2025, Crelan Group and the Crédit Agricole Group announced the signing of a long-term partnership agreement. Under this partnership, Crédit Agricole will take a minority stake of 9.99% in Crelan. In addition, the agreement includes commercial collaborations in asset management, private banking and leasing, enabling Crelan to further strengthen its offer and expertise.

== Sponsorship ==
Since 2001 the bank has sponsored several professional cycling teams, which hosted three world champions, Sven Nys, Wout van Aert and Sanne Cant.

Crelan views sport as an important element of a healthy, balanced lifestyle and as a means of fostering social cohesion. The company supports values such as fair play and team spirit.

Crelan has long been active as a sponsor of a number of sporting disciplines

The bank consciously chooses sports with a high degree of interaction between athletes and supporters.

=== Basket-ball ===
==== Belgian Cats & Belgian Lions ====
Since May 2019, Crelan has been supporting the Belgian Lions and the European champions, the Belgian Cats. In addition to the classic 5x5 version, Crelan is also a major partner of the modern street version: 3x3 basketball. Crelan is the main sponsor of the Young Belgian Cats & Lions (U20).

=== Cyclo-cross ===
==== Crelan–Corendon ====
Crelan has been active as a sponsor in cycling since 2000, initially under the name Crédit Agricole and, since September 2023, as the main sponsor of the Crelan-Corendon cyclo-cross team. Our bank is also involved in the training programme for the U23 youth teams, in order to offer the best chances for the future to young Belgian cyclo-cross talent.

=== Cyclism ===
==== Alpecin-Deceuninck ====
After an absence of 4 and a half years, Crelan is back as a sponsor of the road cycling peloton. Crelan is the banking partner of the Belgian World Tour team: Alpecin-Deceuninck. Thanks to Crelan, the team can obtain its World Tour licence and shine at the highest level with top cyclists such as Jasper Philipsen, Mathieu van der Poel,...

== See also ==
- List of banks in the euro area
- List of banks in Belgium
