= ASLK/CGER =

Former Belgian bank

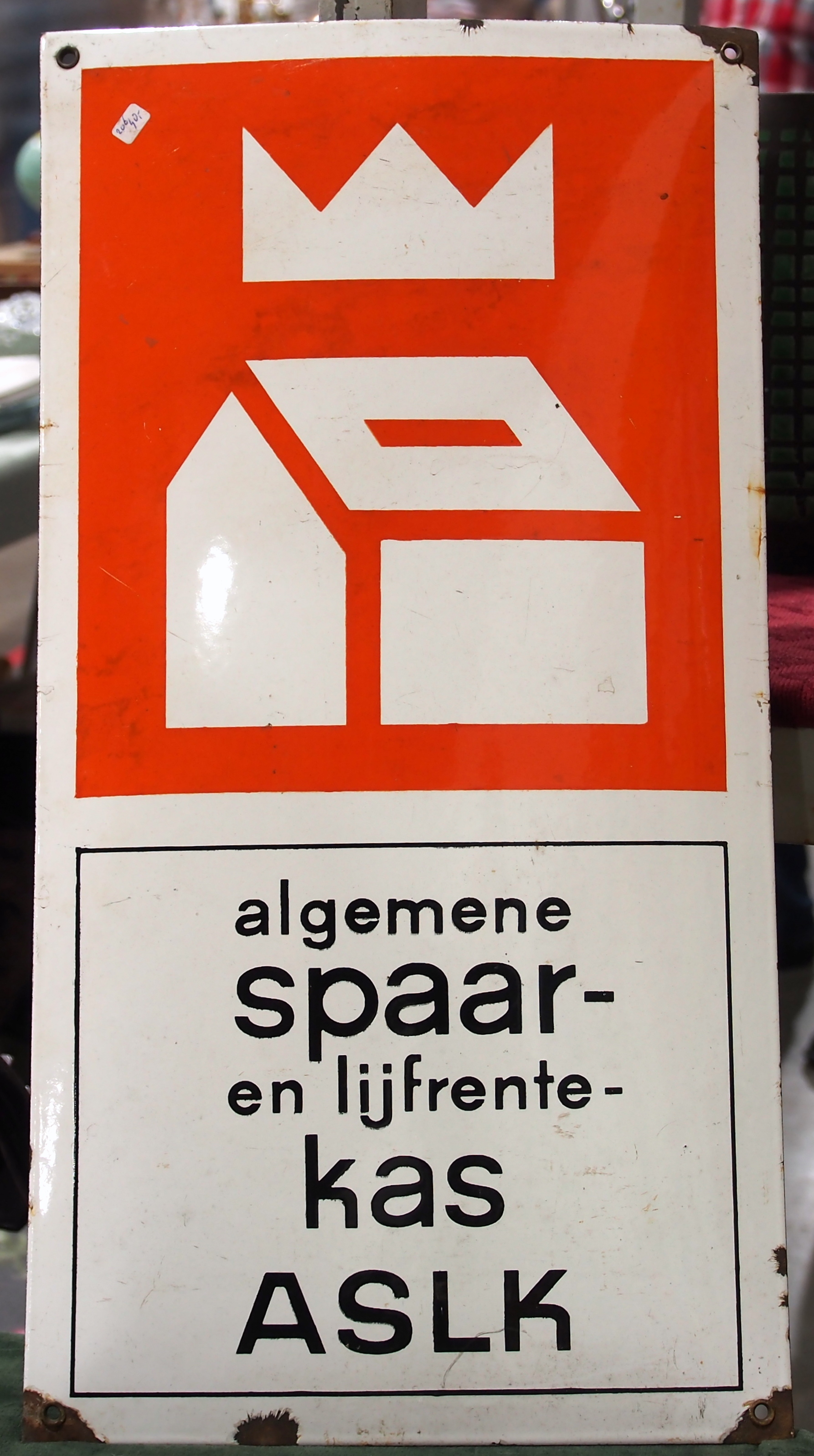
ASLK logo

The Algemene Spaar- en Lijfrentekas / Caisse générale d'épargne et de retraite (ASLK / CGER, lit. 'General Savings and Pensions Bank') was a major Belgian public bank, originally created in 1850 as a pension institution. It was privatized and acquired by Fortis Group, in stages between 1993 and 1998. In 1999 Fortis merged it with Générale de Banque and other operations to form Fortis Bank, which in turn was integrated from 2009 into BNP Paribas.

== History ==
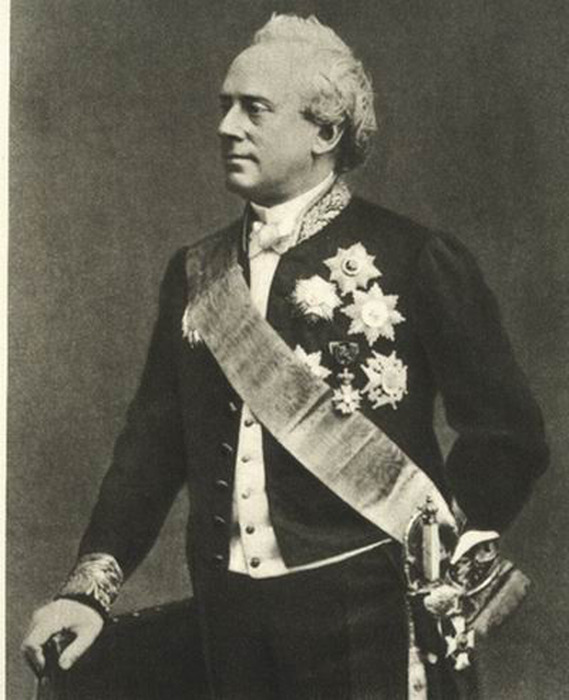
Walthère Frère-Orban (1812–1896), architect of the creation of CGER

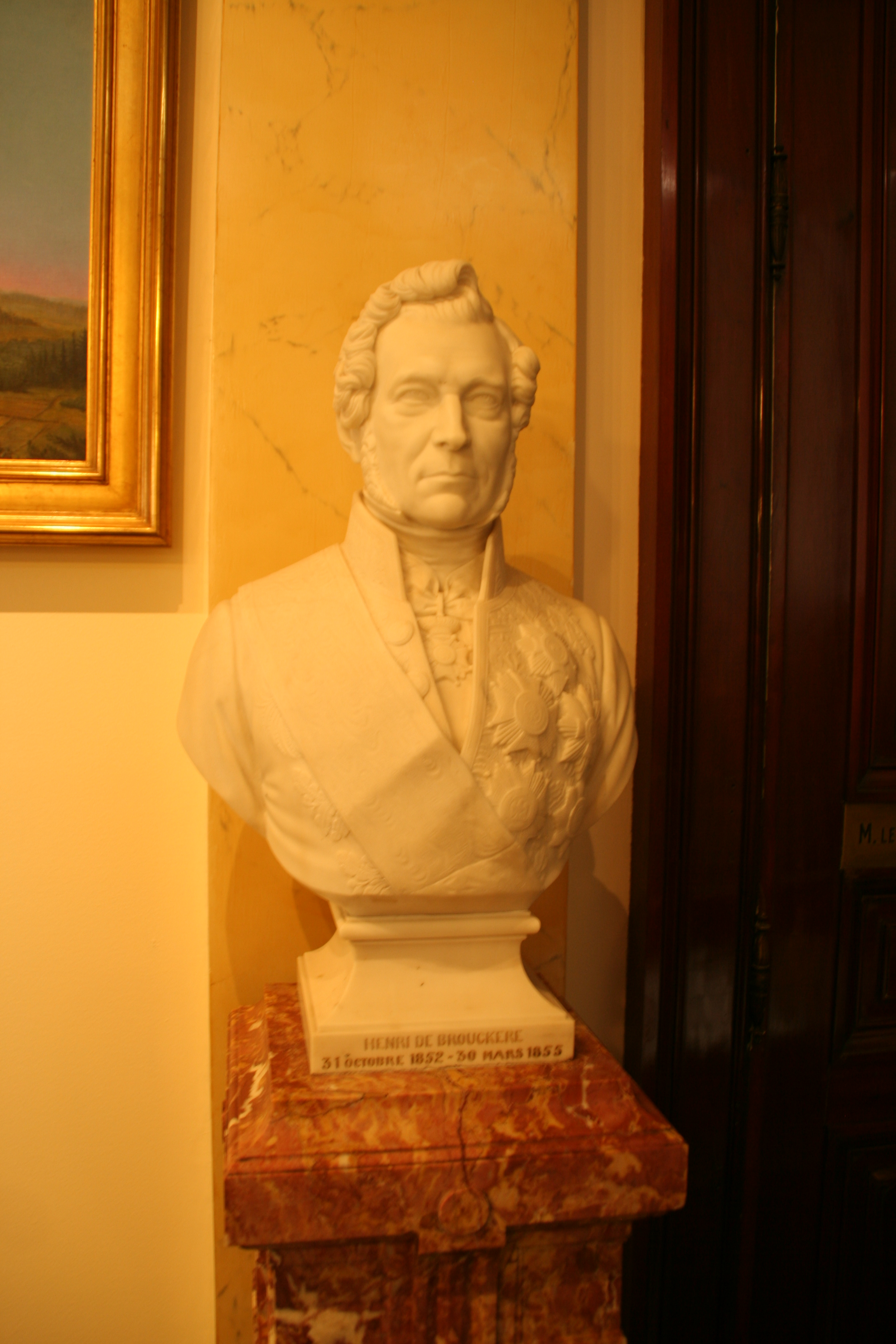
Henri de Brouckère (1801–1891), the CGER's founding chairman

The institution was the brainchild of Belgian statesman Walthère Frère-Orban, who by law of 8 May 1850 created Belgium's Caisse générale de retraite (lit. 'General Pension Fund'), and on 16 March 1865 transformed it into the CGER by expanding it with a savings bank (French: caisse d'épargne). One of Frère-Orban's aims was to mitigate the dominance of the Société Générale de Belgique in the Belgian financial system, a concern that also led to his creation of the National Bank of Belgium in 1850 following limited success of an earlier attempt, the Banque de Belgique, created in 1835 but which underwent financial stress in 1848. Frère-Orban intended the CGER to provide savings and pension services to workers and the general public, taking inspiration from savings banks in neighboring countries and particularly German Sparkassen. The CGER was thus established as a sui generis public-sector entity guaranteed by the Belgian state.

In 1870, the CGER started distributing its services through the Belgian network of post offices, making it in practice the country's postal savings system, after having previously used the network of the National Bank. The number of savings accounts (French: livrets d'épargne) held at the CGER grew rapidly, reaching 730,000 in 1890 and 3.1 million in 1913. The CGER was gradually authorized by the Belgian government to diversify its activity into more banking services offerings. In 1884 the CGER started to provide agricultural loans. From 1889 it started providing mortgages to workers and related life insurance services. From 1903 it offered workplace insurance through the Caisse de Retraite pour les Accidents du Travail. In the first half of the 20th century, it was heavily involved in the financing of Belgium's housing and agricultural development policies.

After World War II, it expanded further into export credit and lending to industry, and also lent significantly to the Belgian state itself. from 1959 it started building up its own branch network, and in 1975 was eventually granted a general banking license. In 1980 it was also authorized to expand abroad. In 1992 it became a joint-stock holding company, in French CGER-Holding, with two main subsidiaries for banking and insurance services respectively, in French CGER-Banque and CGER-Assurances. In 1993, Fortis Group acquired half of the equity of both the banking and insurance subsidiaries from the Belgian state, then further raised its stake to 74.9 percent in 1997 and 100 percent in 1998. Meanwhile, in 1996 it took over the Société Nationale de Crédit à l'Industrie, another Belgian public bank.

Fortis eventually merged ASLK/CGER with Générale de Banque in mid-1999. Since 2009, the former CGER operations have subsequently been part of BNP Paribas Fortis.

== Brussels headquarters complex ==
The CGER was first lodged in a former private residence, the Hôtel de Marnix at 13, rue du Chêne/Eikstraat, which was demolished in the 1880s for the erection of the Athénée royal de Bruxelles. In 1874, the CGER moved into a brand-new neo-Renaissance building designed by architect Antoine Trappeniers at no. 31 of the newly created Place de Brouckère/De Brouckèreplein. In 1888, the CGER decided to build another head office on the nearby Rue du Fossé aux Loups/Wolvengracht, which was designed by architect Hendrik Beyaert (with assistance from Paul Hankar for metalwork design) and completed in 1893. Meanwhile, the CGER sold its former building in 1891 to Prosper and Edouard Wielemans, who remodeled it with added floors into the famed Hotel Métropole, opened in 1894.

The ASLK/CGER complex bordering the Rue du Fossé aux Loups was later enlarged on several occasions: in 1901–1904 (architect Henri Van Dievoet), 1910–1918 (arch. Alban Chambon), 1930–1934 and 1947–1953 (arch. Alfred Chambon), 1969–1975 (arch. Marcel Lambrichs and associates), and 1980–1986 (arch. Albert De Doncker, Philippe Samyn, Walter Bresseleers, and Jacques Wybauw for remodeling of the south block, later demolished; Erauw, Lievens and Douglas (ELD) architects in the north block). Alfred Chambon's second extension, designed in 1946–1947 and inaugurated in 1953 on the location of the former director's residence, displays an original monumental style with stone and copper-clad façades and a decorative frieze by sculptor Oscar Jespers, as well as state-of-the-art technical facilities inside. One of the 1980s extensions collapsed in 2013 during renovation.

In 2011, following the acquisition of the Belgian operations of Fortis Group by BNP Paribas, BNP Paribas Fortis sold the complex's southern block to property developed Allfin for mixed-use redevelopment including a hotel, apartments, office space, and a school.

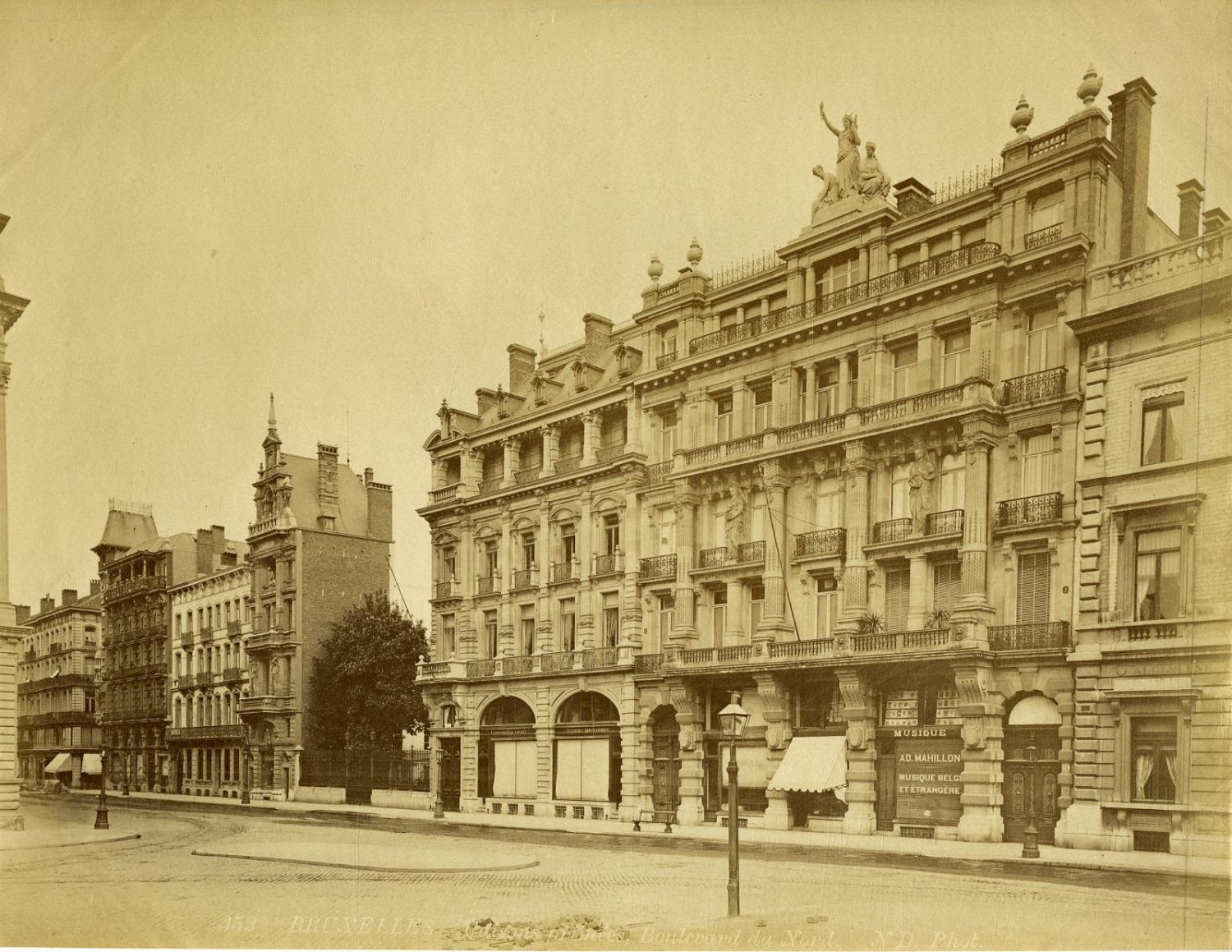
The CGER on the Place de Brouckère/De Brouckèreplein partly visible on the far right, next to the Café Métropole (right), ca. 1870s

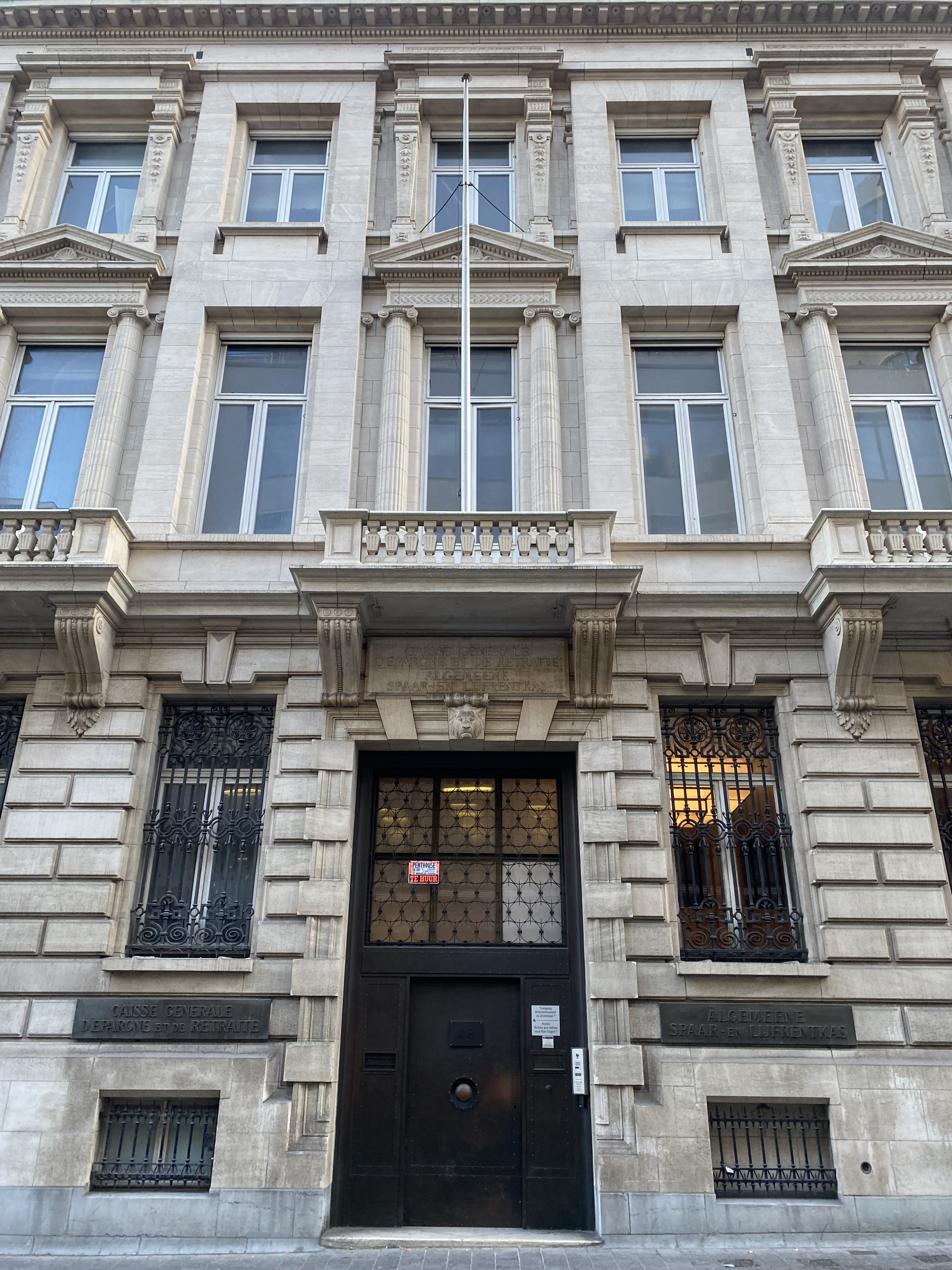
Entrance portal on the Rue du Fossé aux Loups/Wolvengracht, with name in French (above and left) and Dutch (below and right)

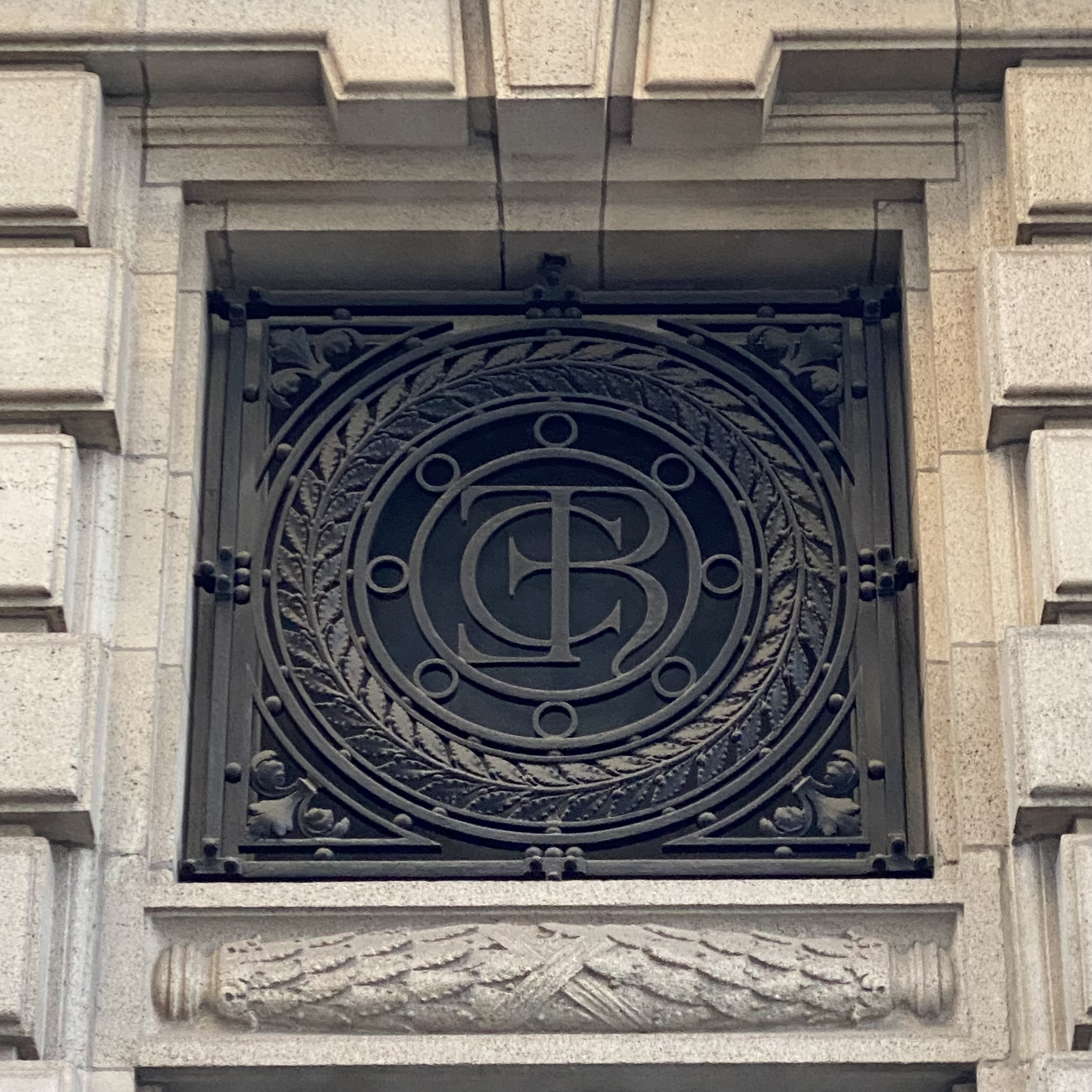
Metalwork with the initials C[G]ER on the Rue d'Argent/Zilverstraat

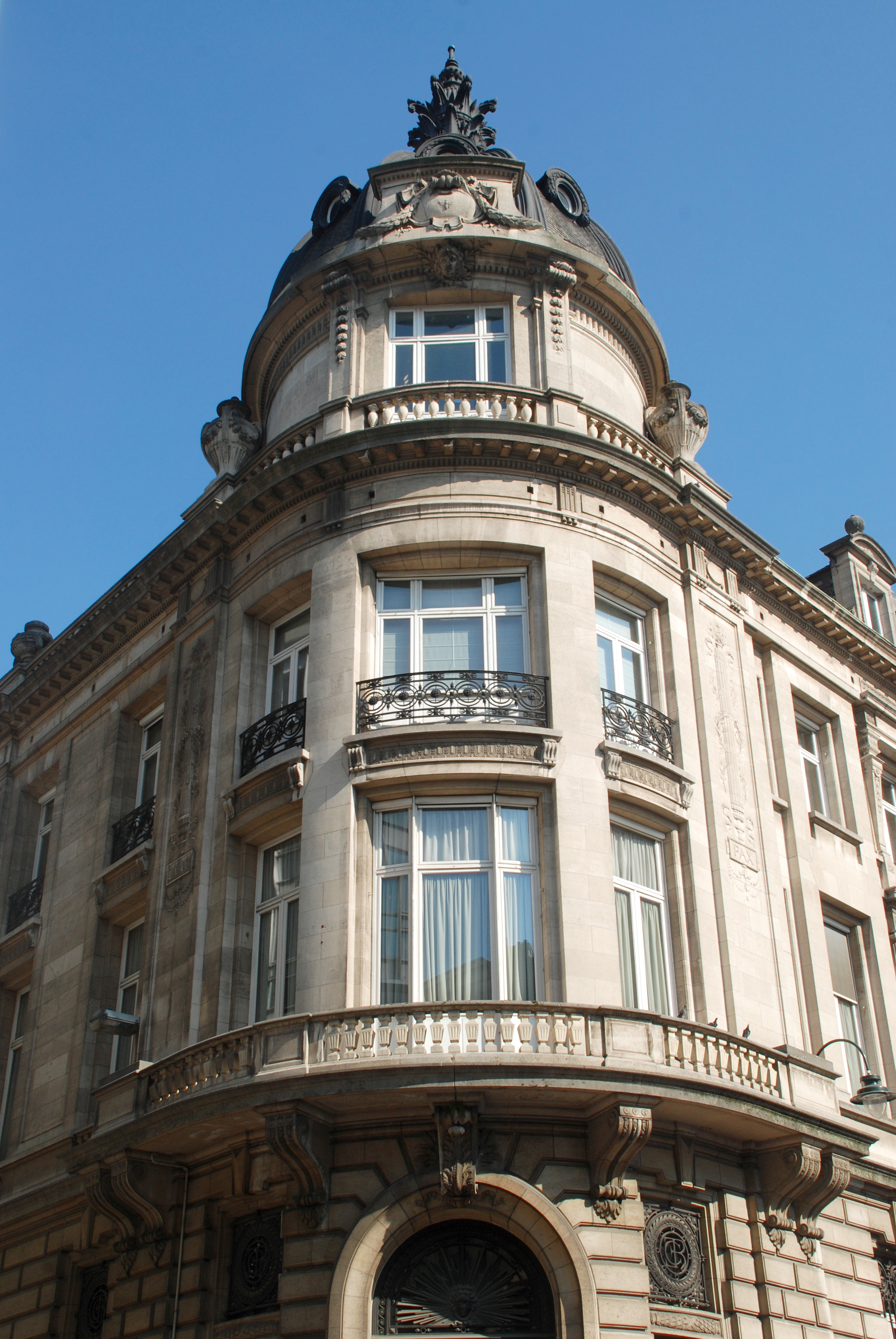
Rotunda at the angle of the Rue d'Argent and the Rue du Fossé-aux-Loups, designed by Alban Chambon in the 1910s

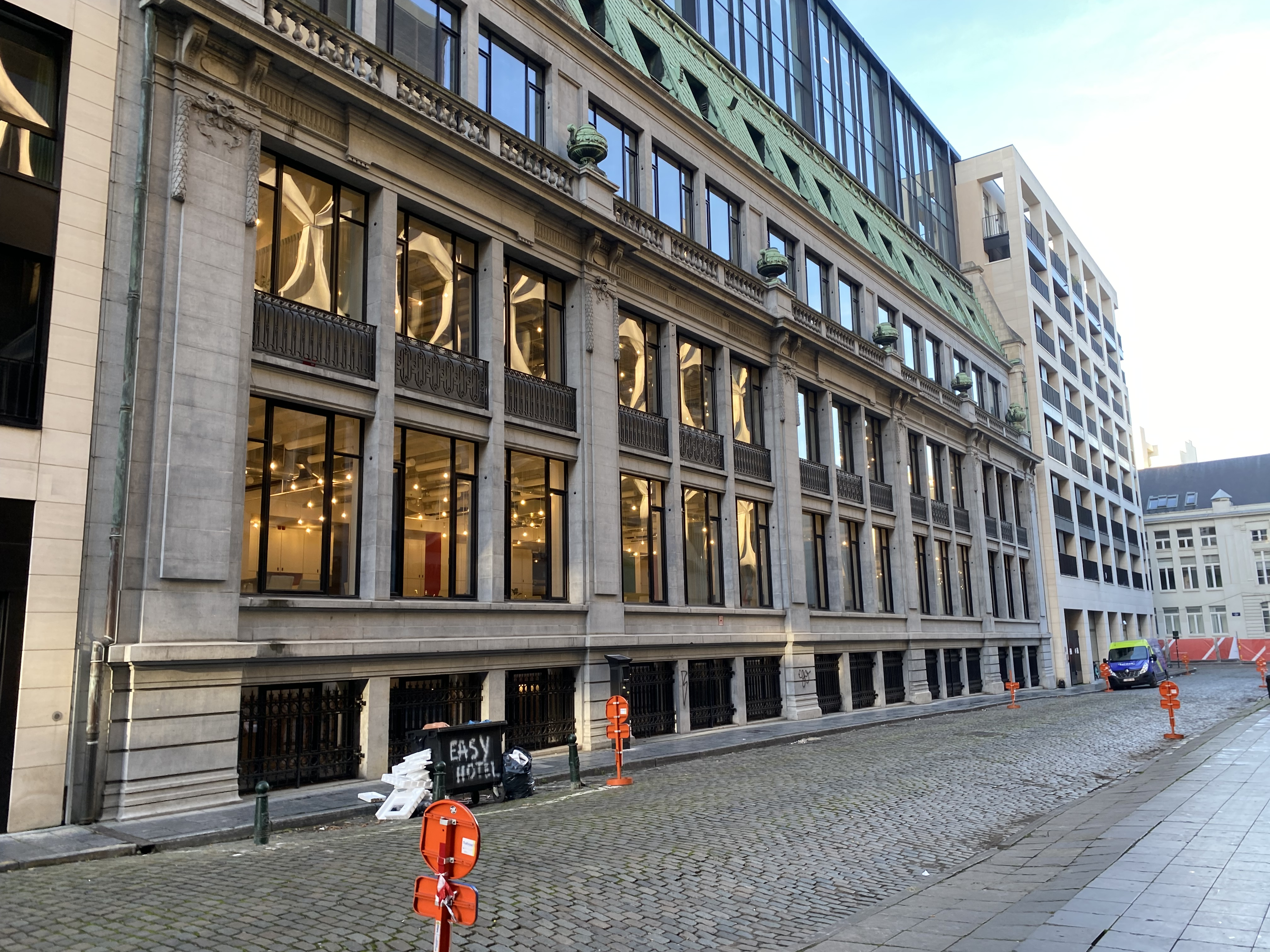
Former extension designed by Alfred Chambon in the 1930s on the Rue des Boiteux/Kreupelenstraat, remodeled in the 2010s

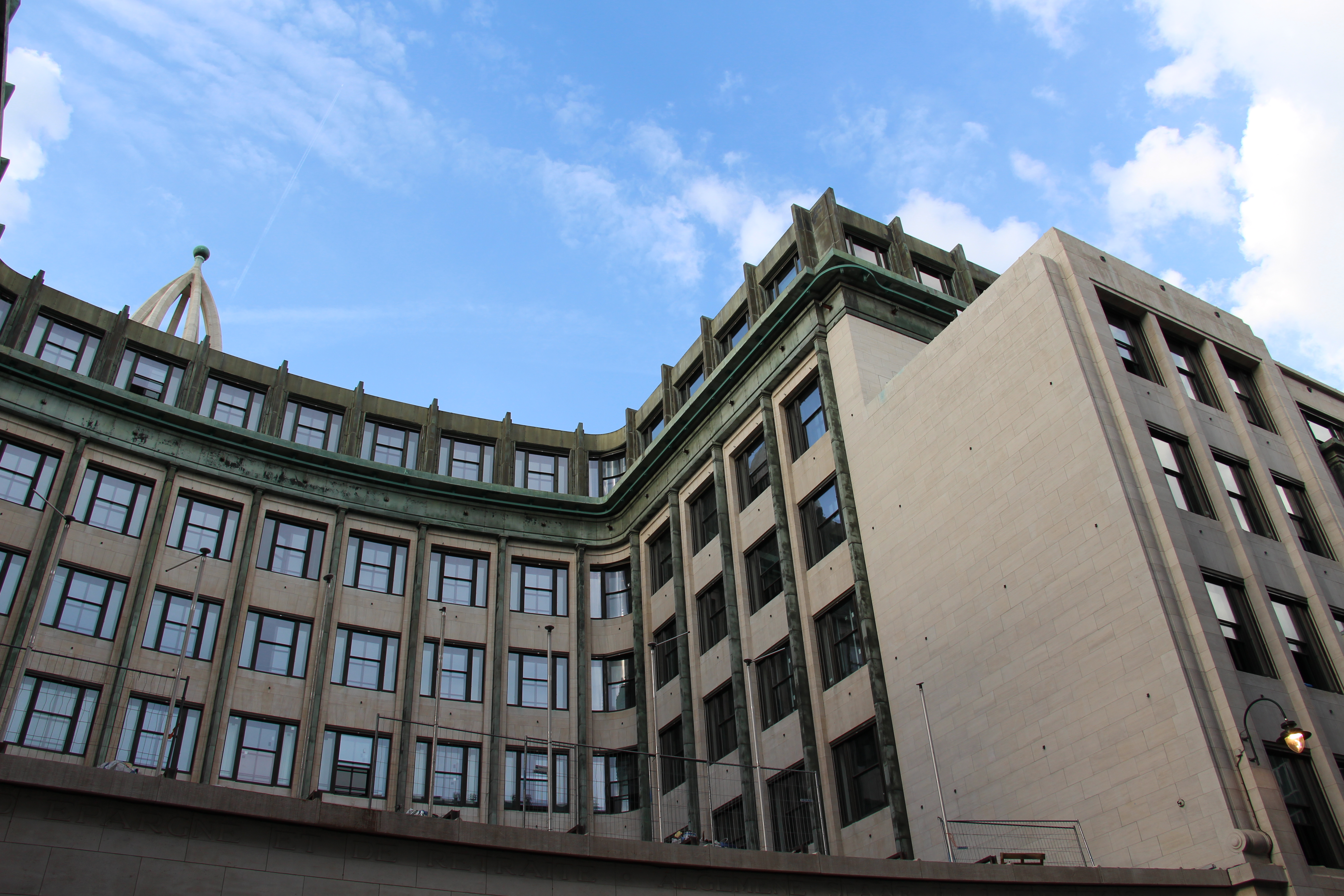
Late-1940s extension designed by Alfred Chambon, façade on the Rue du Fossé aux Loups

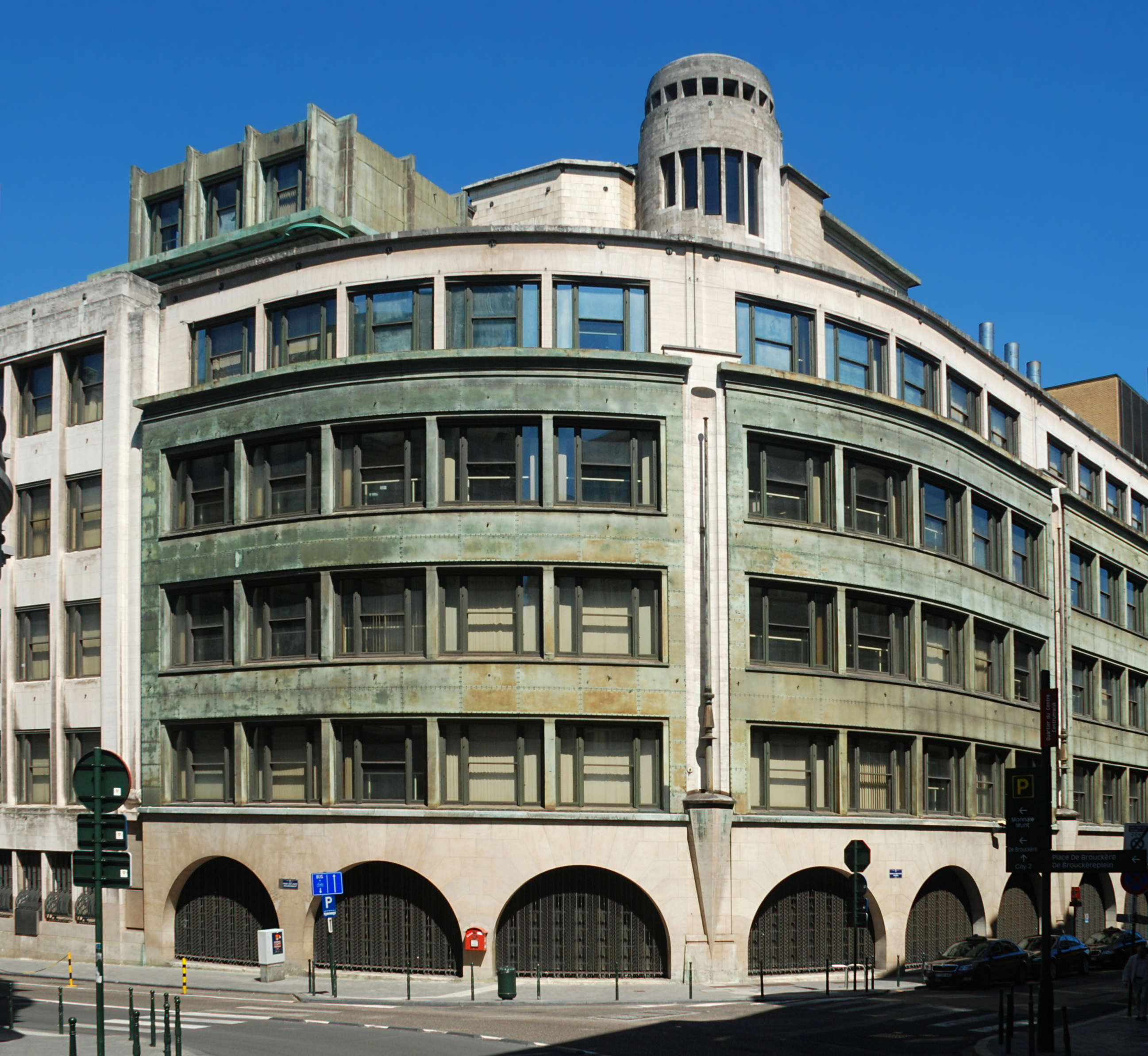
Late-1940s extension, angle with the Rue Montagne aux Herbes Potagères/Warmoesberg

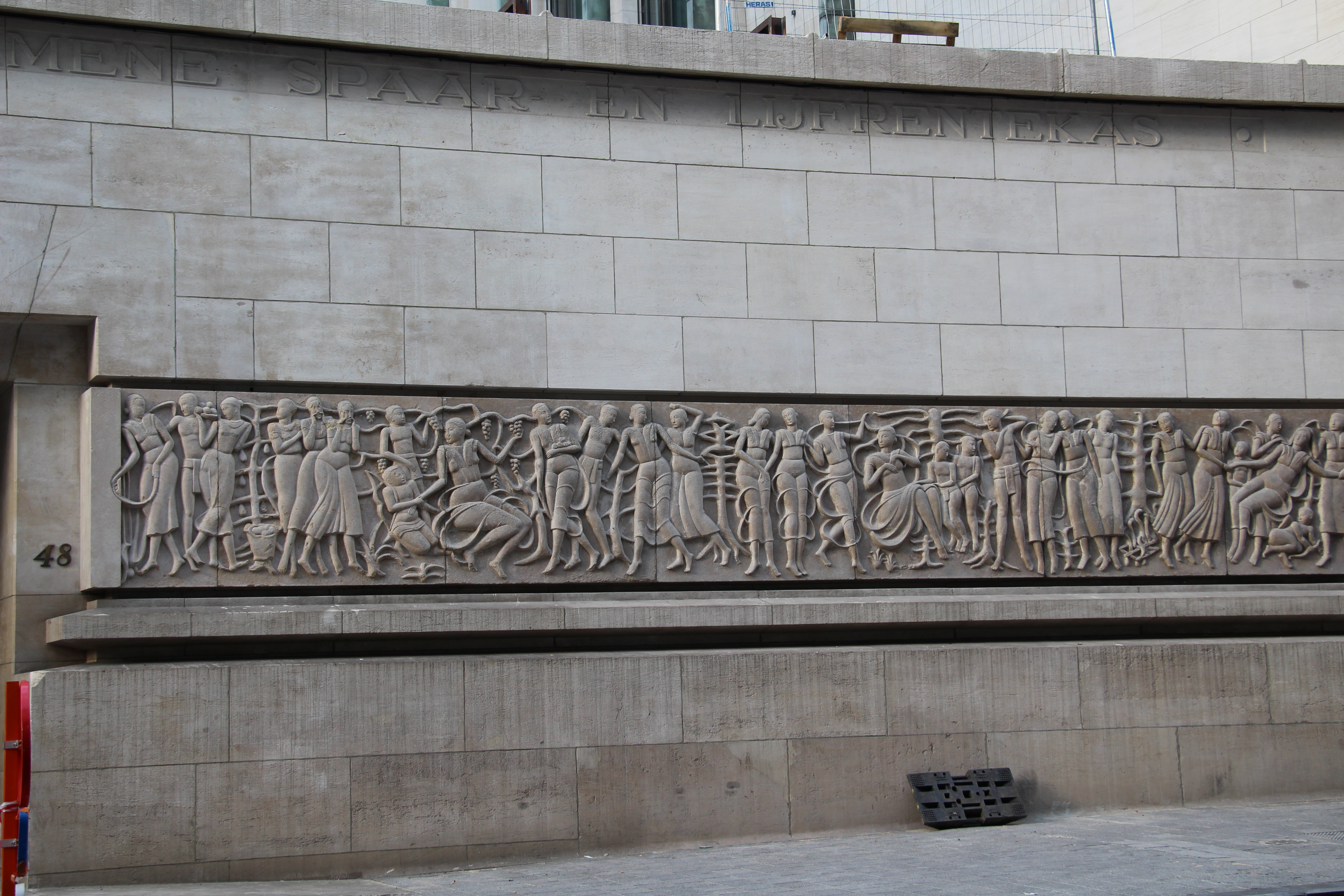
Late-1940s extension, decorative frieze by Oscar Jespers

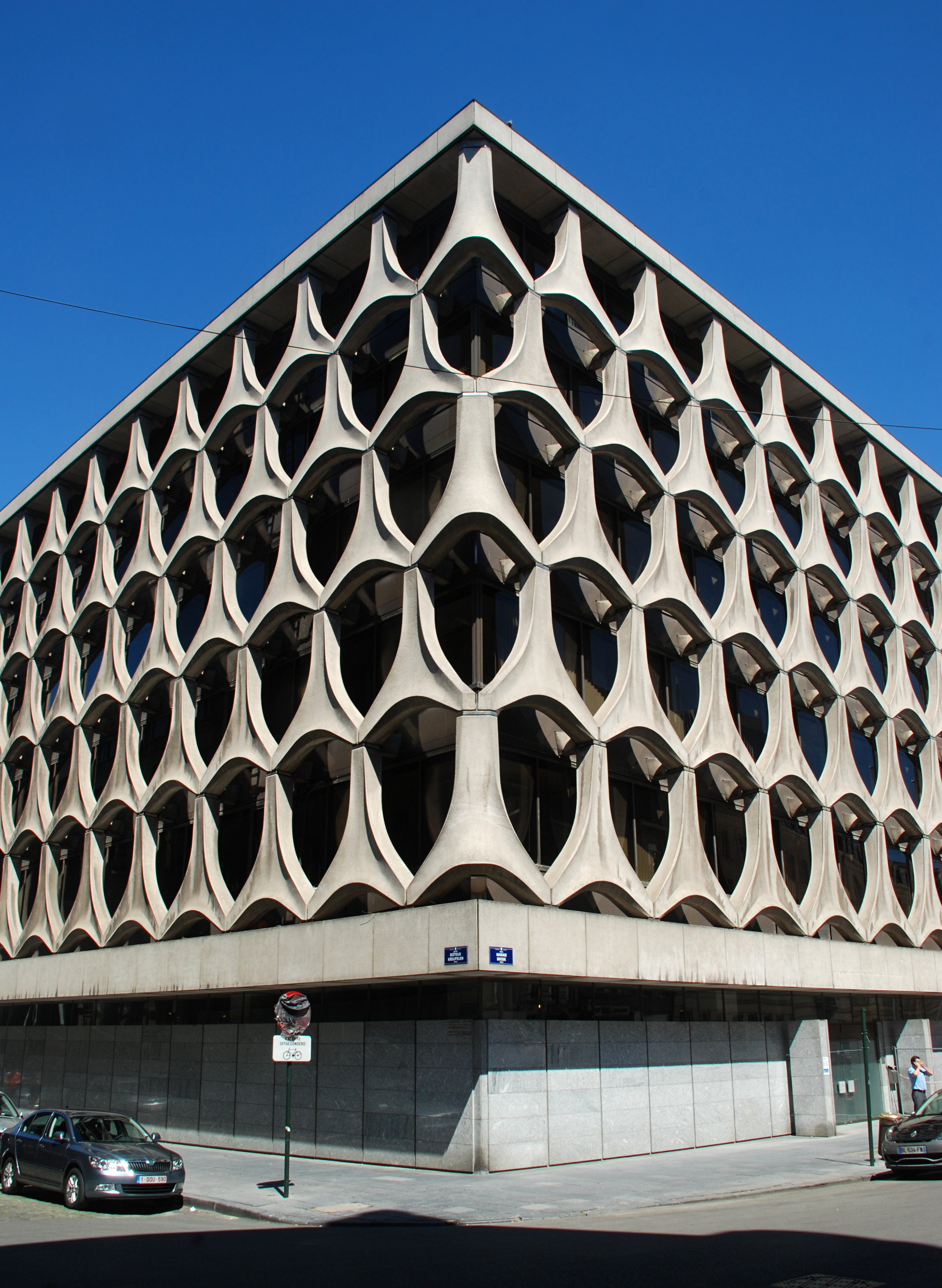
1970s extension on the Rue du Marais/Broekstraat

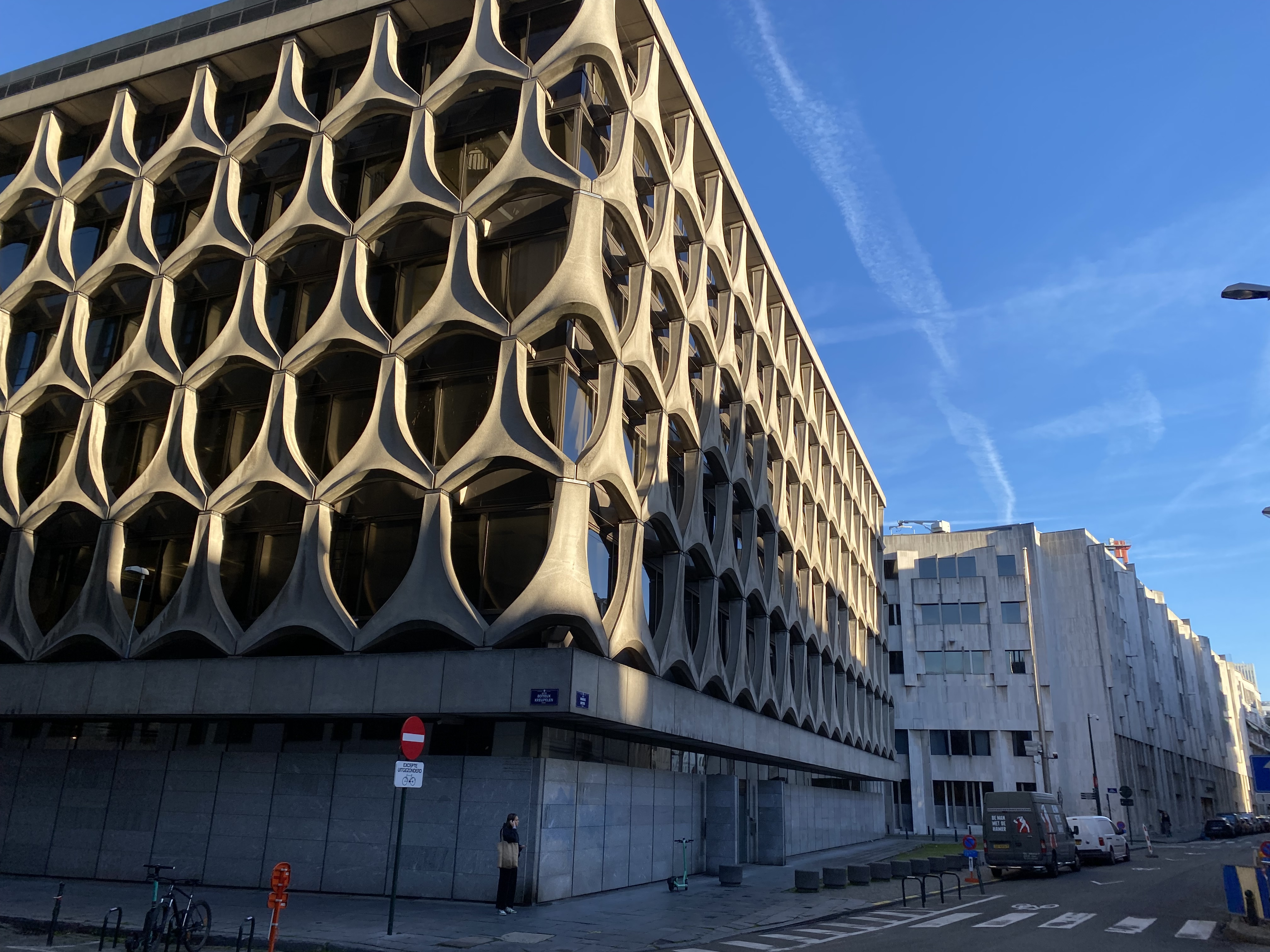
Extensions of the 1970s (left) and 1980s (right, by ELD Architects), Rue du Marais

== Leadership ==
- Henri de Brouckère, chairman 1865–1889
- Victor Van Hoegaerden, chairman 1889–1905
- Maurice Anspach, chairman 1919–1936
- Fernand Hautain, chairman 1937–1938
- Henri Renier, chairman 1938–1947
- Raoul Miry, chairman 1947–1952
- Émile van Dievoet, chairman 1952–1954
- Max Drechsel, chairman 1954–1969
- Louis Van Helshoecht, chairman ca. 1969–1980
- Luc Aerts, chairman ca. 1980–1991
- Herman Verwilst, chairman 1992–1996
- Karel De Boeck, chairman 1996–1999

== See also ==
- Compagnie de Bruxelles
- Générale de Banque
- Groupe Caisse d'Épargne
- List of banks in Belgium
