= Société Nationale de Crédit à l'Industrie =

Former Belgian public bank

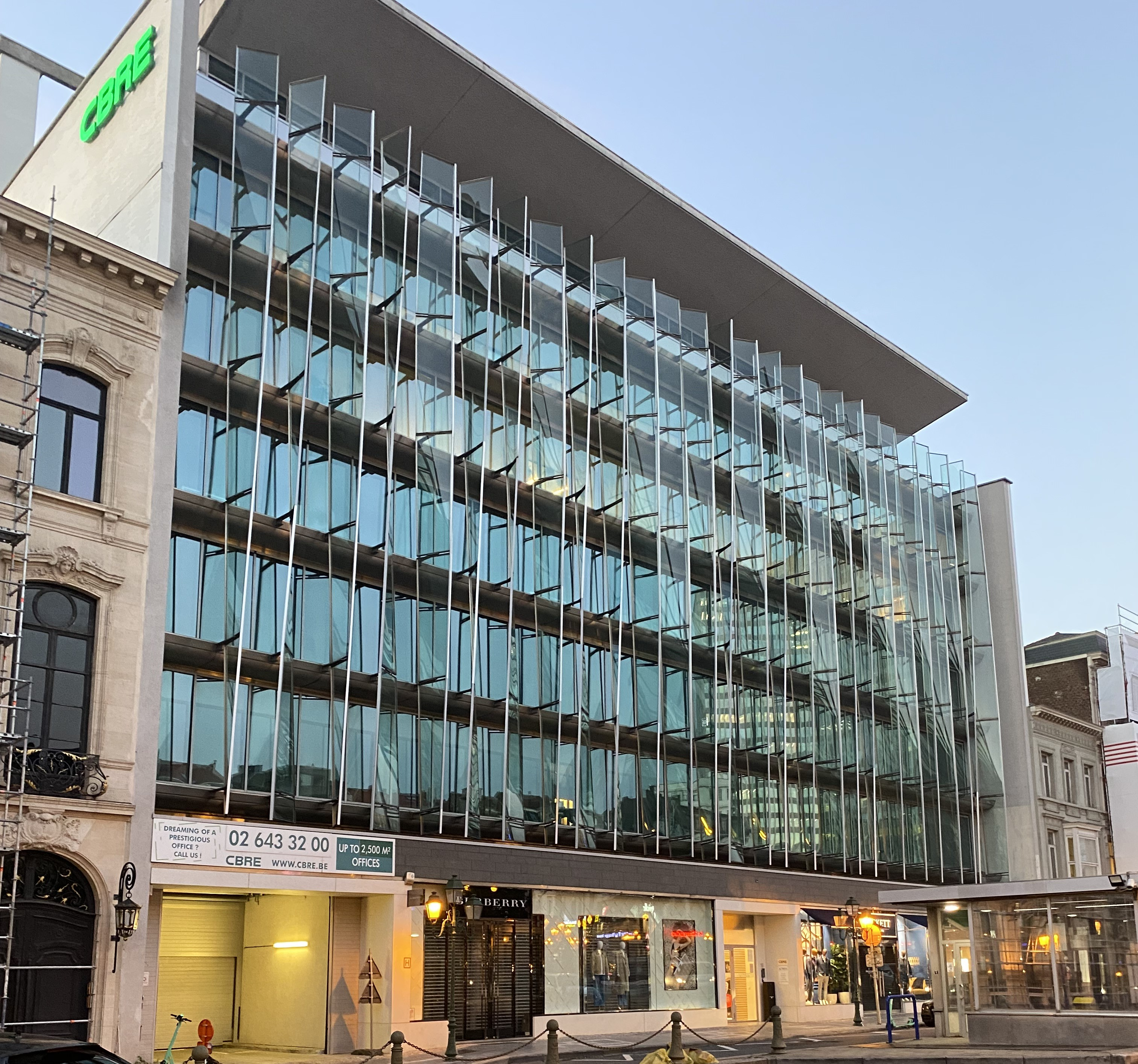
Former head office building on 16 boulevard de Waterloo in Brussels, designed for the SNCI by architect Hugo Van Kuyck in 1958 and inaugurated in 1961

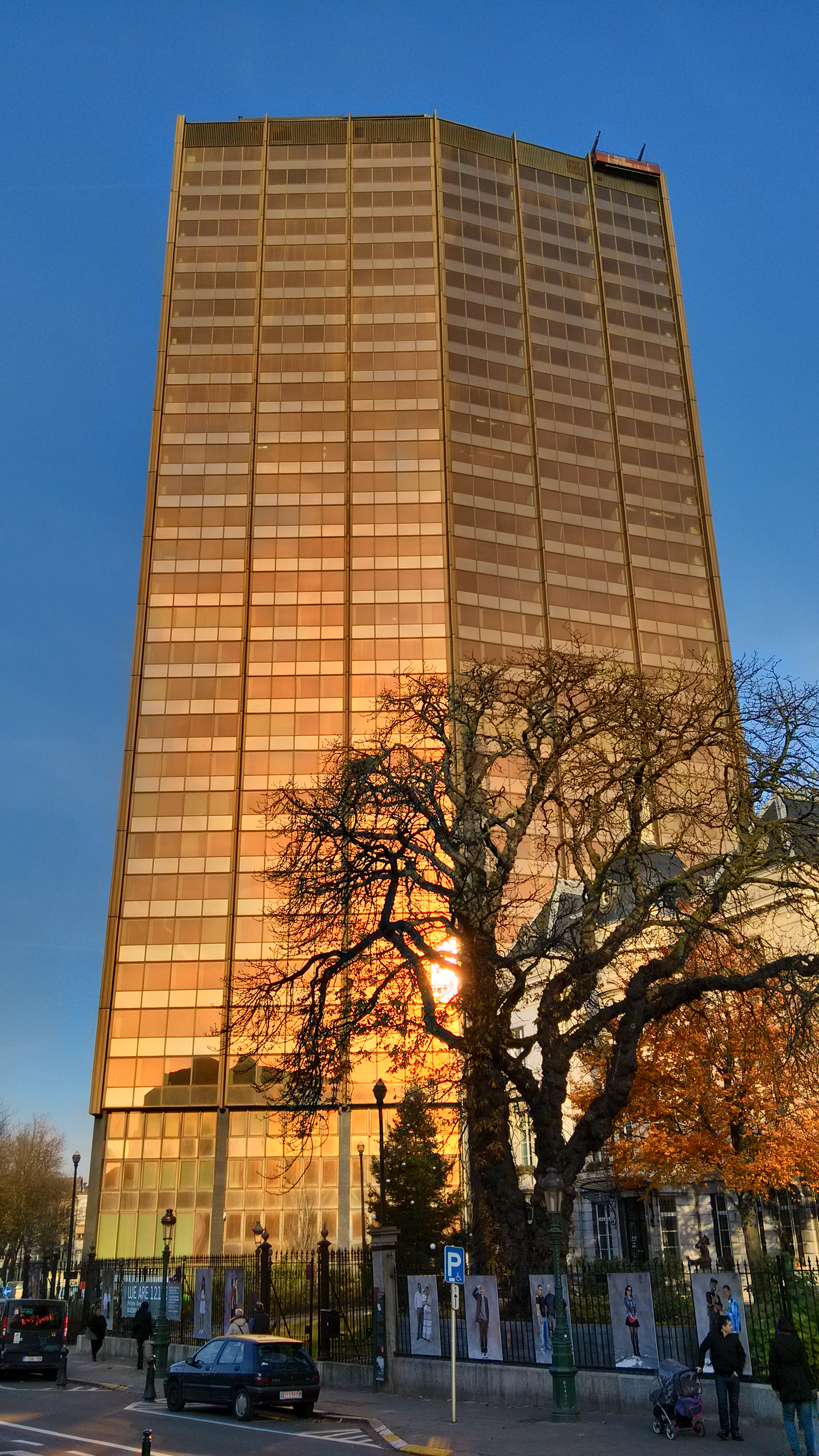
By 1980 the head office of SNCI had moved to the Astro Tower, where it remained until 2005

The Société Nationale de Crédit à l'Industrie, branded Crédit à l'Industrie from the 1980s (Dutch: Nationale Maatschappij voor Krediet aan de Nijverheid, SNCI / NMKN; lit. 'National Industrial Credit Company'), was a Belgian public bank. It was established in 1919 to help finance post-World War I reconstruction, and eventually merged into ASLK / CGER in 1996-1997.

== Interwar period ==
The Société Nationale de Crédit à l’Industrie was created by legislation of 16 March 1919 by the Belgian state in the context of post-World War I reconstruction, as a non-profit state entity, partly inspired by France's Crédit National. It was initially capitalized by the National Bank of Belgium (NBB) and its shares were distributed to the NBB's shareholders, to which it was thus initially a sister company. Its head office was located at 26, Boulevard de Berlaimont in Brussels, not far from that of the National Bank.

The SNCI first specialised in shipping loans, and in grants to industrial companies whose plants had been damaged during the war. In 1926, a capital increase allowed the large Belgian commercial banks to strengthen their presence among the SNCI's shareholders and to gradually dominate its board. In August 1934 its scope was expanded, as it was authorized to take over industrial loans (with recourse) from Belgian banks that were struggling in the aftermath of the European banking crisis of 1931. The program was further expanded in 1935.

== Postwar era ==
After World War II, the SNCI was "half-nationalized" simultaneously as the National Bank, namely the Belgian government became the owner of 50 percent of its equity capital. It participated actively in the distribution of loans under the Marshall Plan. Over time, it opened branches and offices in Antwerp, Bruges, Charleroi, Ghent, Hannut, Hasselt, Kortrijk, Leuven, Liège, Lokeren, Mechelen, Mons, Namur, Nivelles, Saint-Nicolas, Tournai, Turnhout, Verviers, and Vilvoorde.

In 1973, the SNCI was a founding member of a club of specialized long-term credit institutions in the European Community, together with France's Crédit National, Germany's Kreditanstalt für Wiederaufbau, Italy's Istituto Mobiliare Italiano, the Netherlands' Nationale Investeringsbank, and the UK's Finance Corporation for Industry among others.

From 1968 to 1986, the Crédit à l'Industrie partnered with ASLK / CGER and became a major provider of state aid to Belgian industrial businesses, e.g. in the textile and steel sectors. After 1986 it started developing its own banking service offerings and was granted a full banking license in 1994. More broadly, the SNCI's role and usefulness as a public-sector organization came into debate in the 1980s and 1990s. The Belgian government coalition agreement of 8 May 1988 foresaw a combination of public-sector banks, resulting in legislation of 17 June 1991 that mandated the integration of the SNCI into a single group together with the Crédit Communal de Belgique and the Office Central de Crédit Hypothécaire. The Crédit Communal, however, ensured that these provisions were not implemented. The SNCI was eventually sold by the Belgian state to ASLK / CGER which fully absorbed it in 1997.

== See also ==
- Long-Term Credit Bank of Japan
- List of banks in Belgium
