= Banque Liégeoise =

Former Belgian bank

The Banque Liégeoise, full original name Banque liégeoise et Caisse d'Épargnes (lit. 'Liège Bank and Savings Bank'), was a bank in Liège, Belgium. It was founded in 1835 and was initially among the note-issuing banks in the recently established country, together with the Société Générale de Belgique, the Banque de Belgique, and the Bank of Flanders in Ghent.

It waived its banknote issuance privilege in 1875 in favor of the National Bank of Belgium.

By 1921 the Banque Liégeoise had foreign investments in Greece, Italy, and Spain. By the second world war, its activity had come to an end. Its head office was on Place Saint-Paul in Liège.

== See also ==
- Banque Nagelmackers
- List of banks in Belgium
