= List of banks in Belgium =

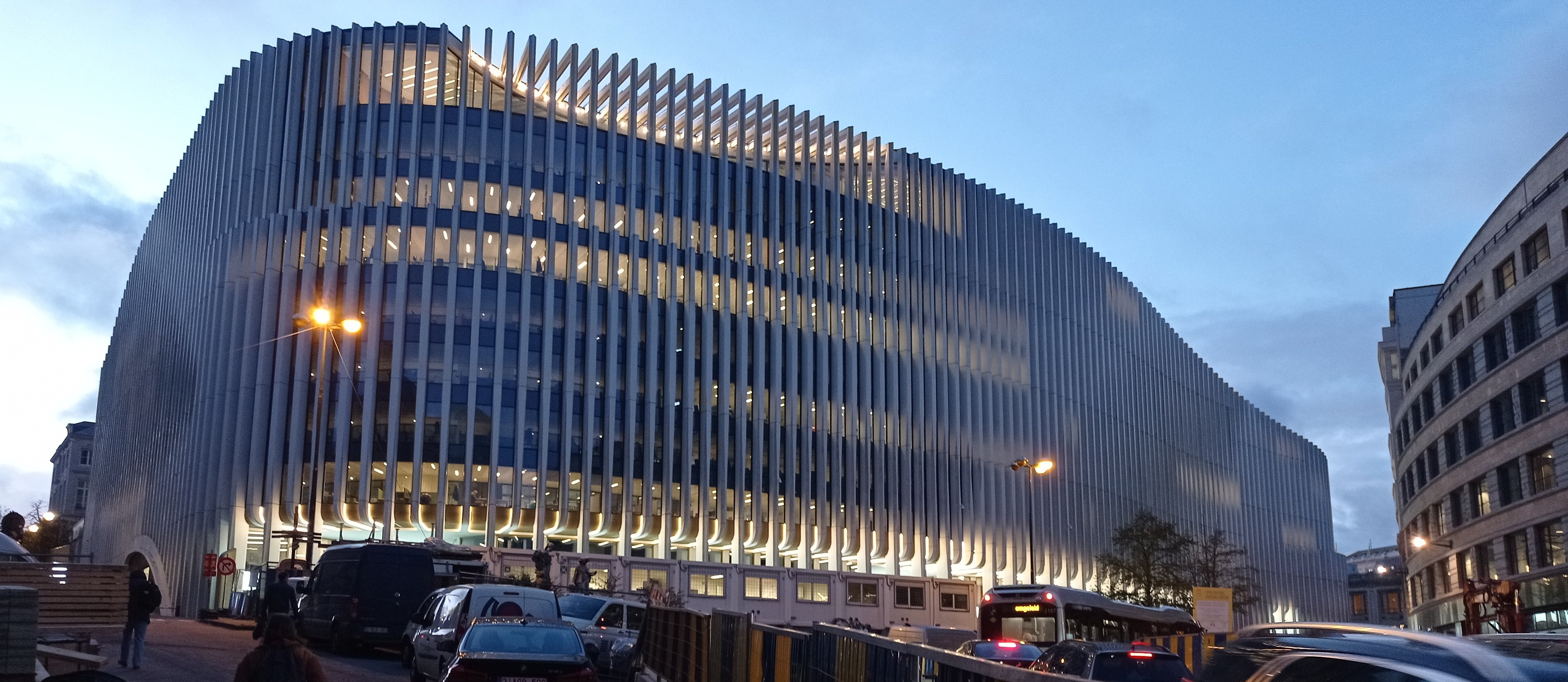
BNP Paribas Fortis head office, Brussels

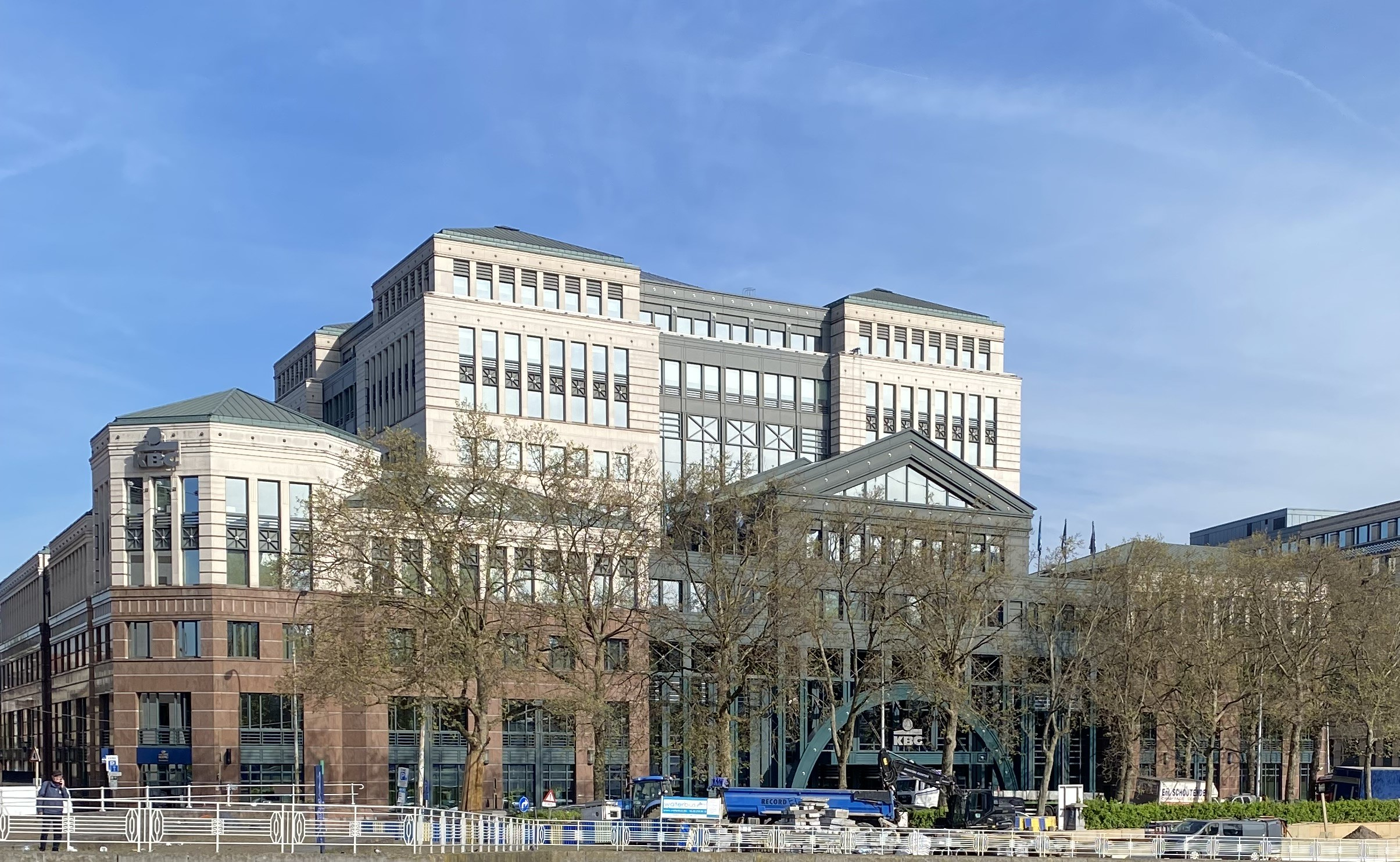
KBC head office, Brussels

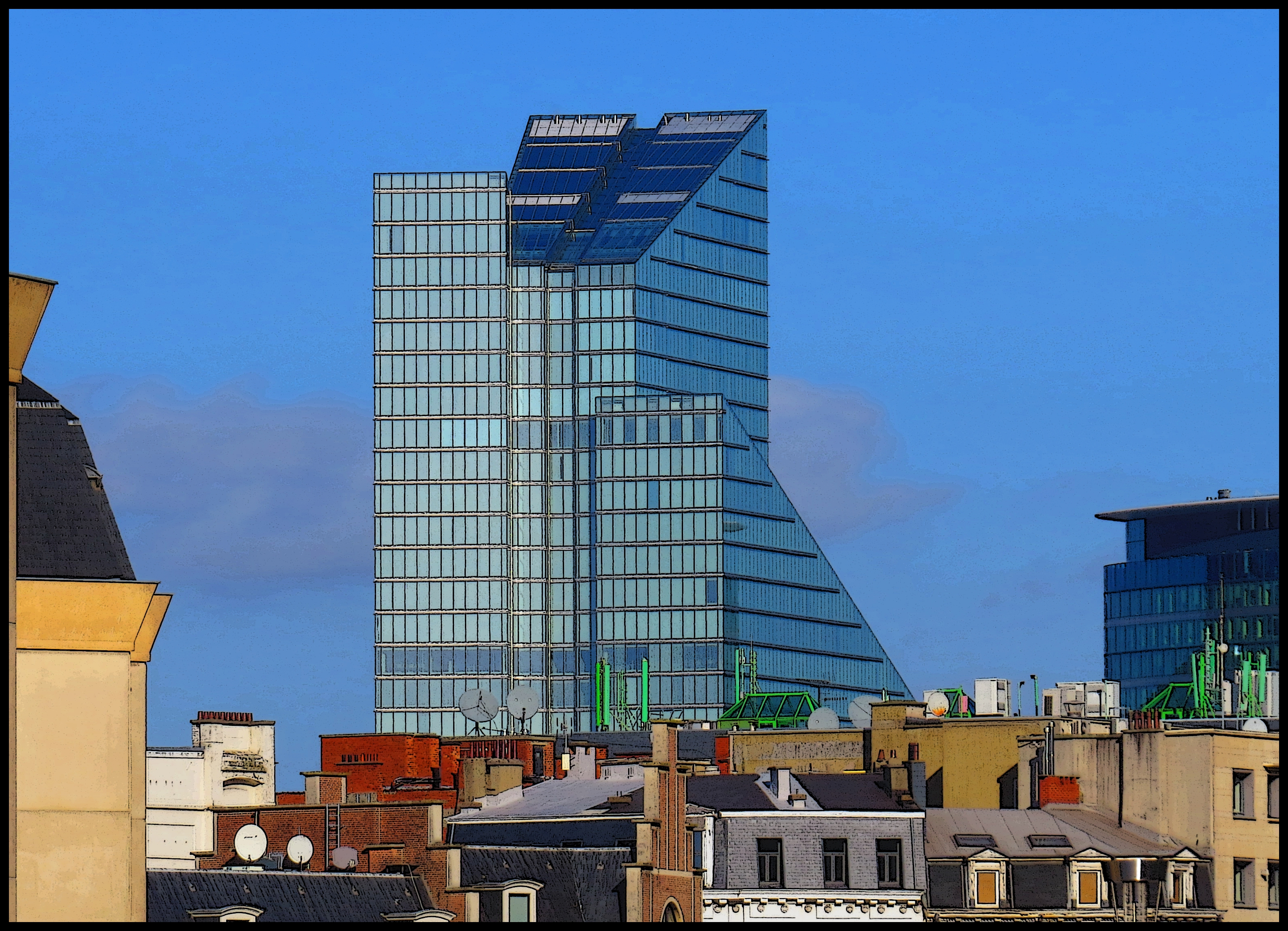
Belfius head office, Brussels

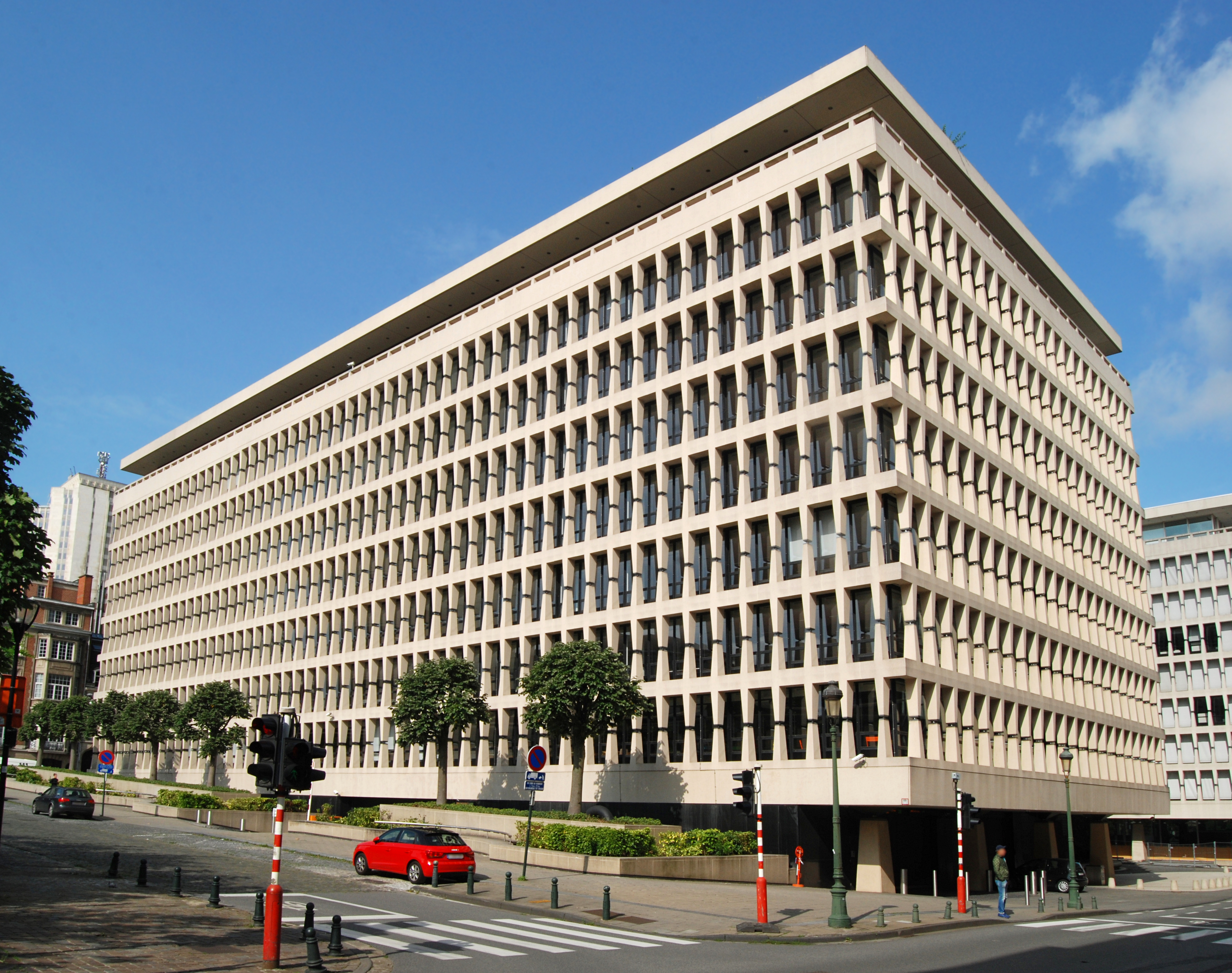
ING Belgium head office, Brussels

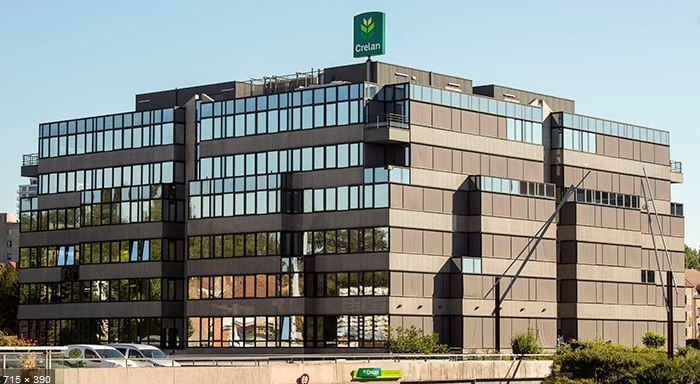
Crelan head office, Brussels

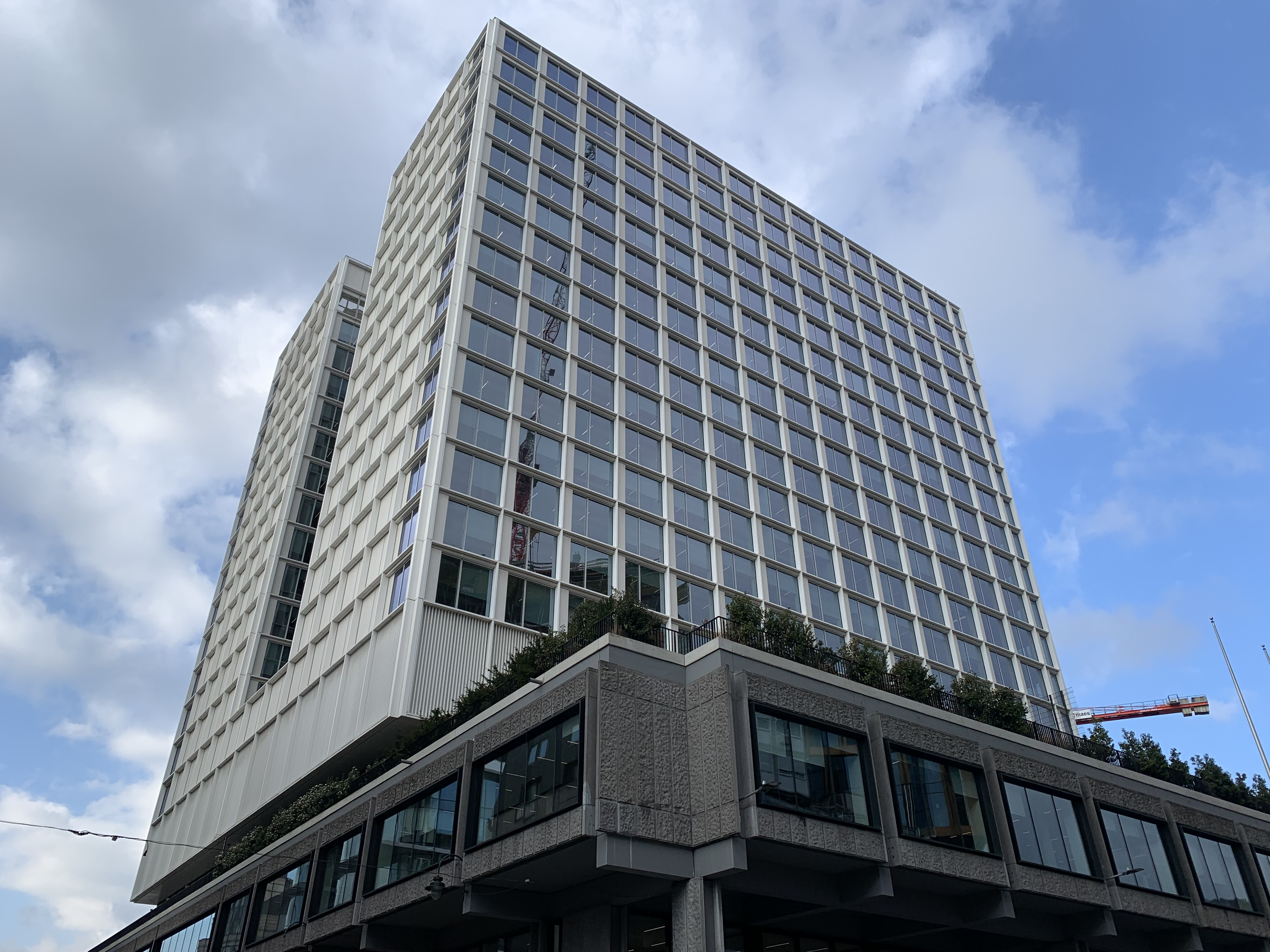
Multi Tower in Brussels, BNY head office

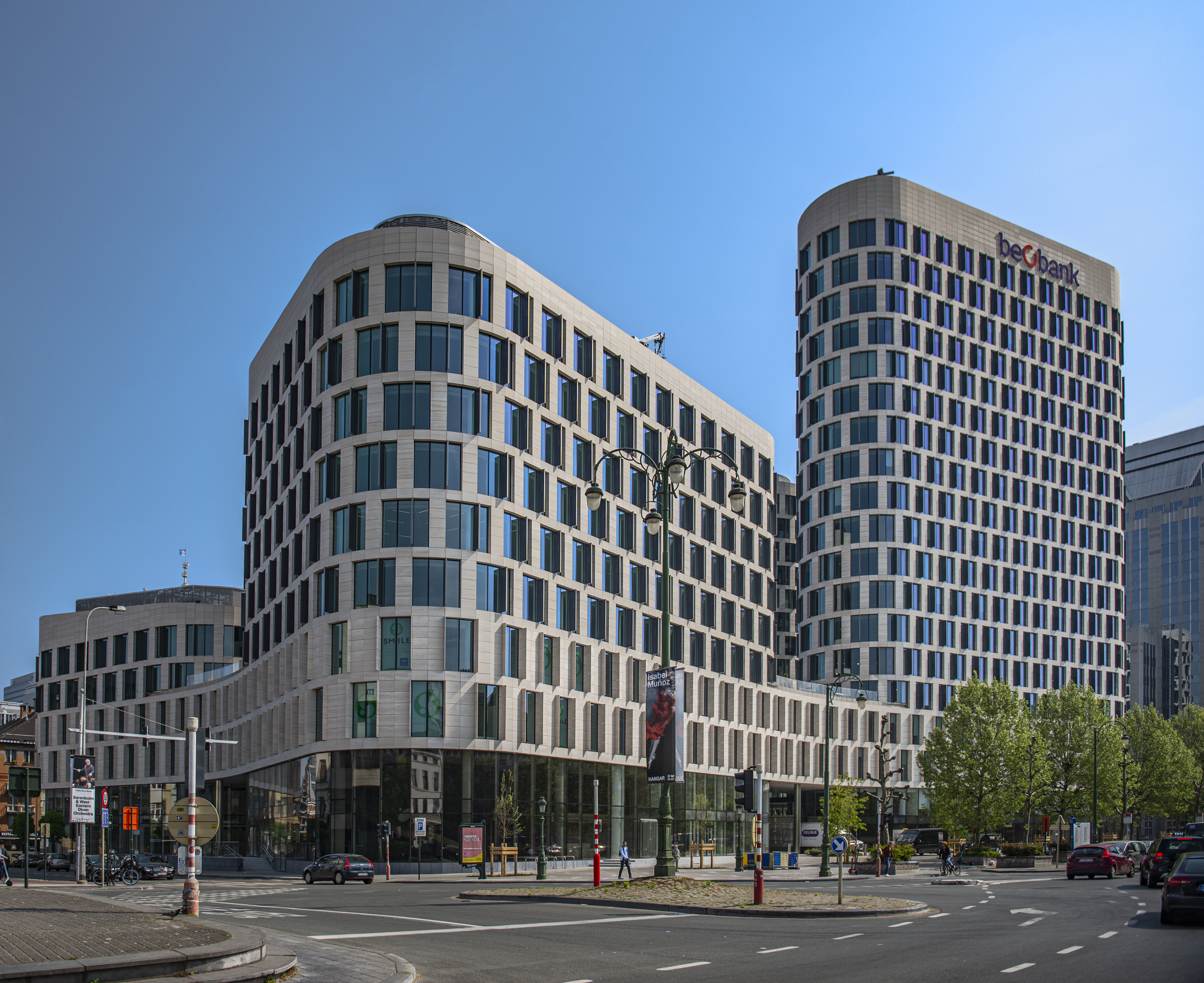
Beobank head office, Brussels

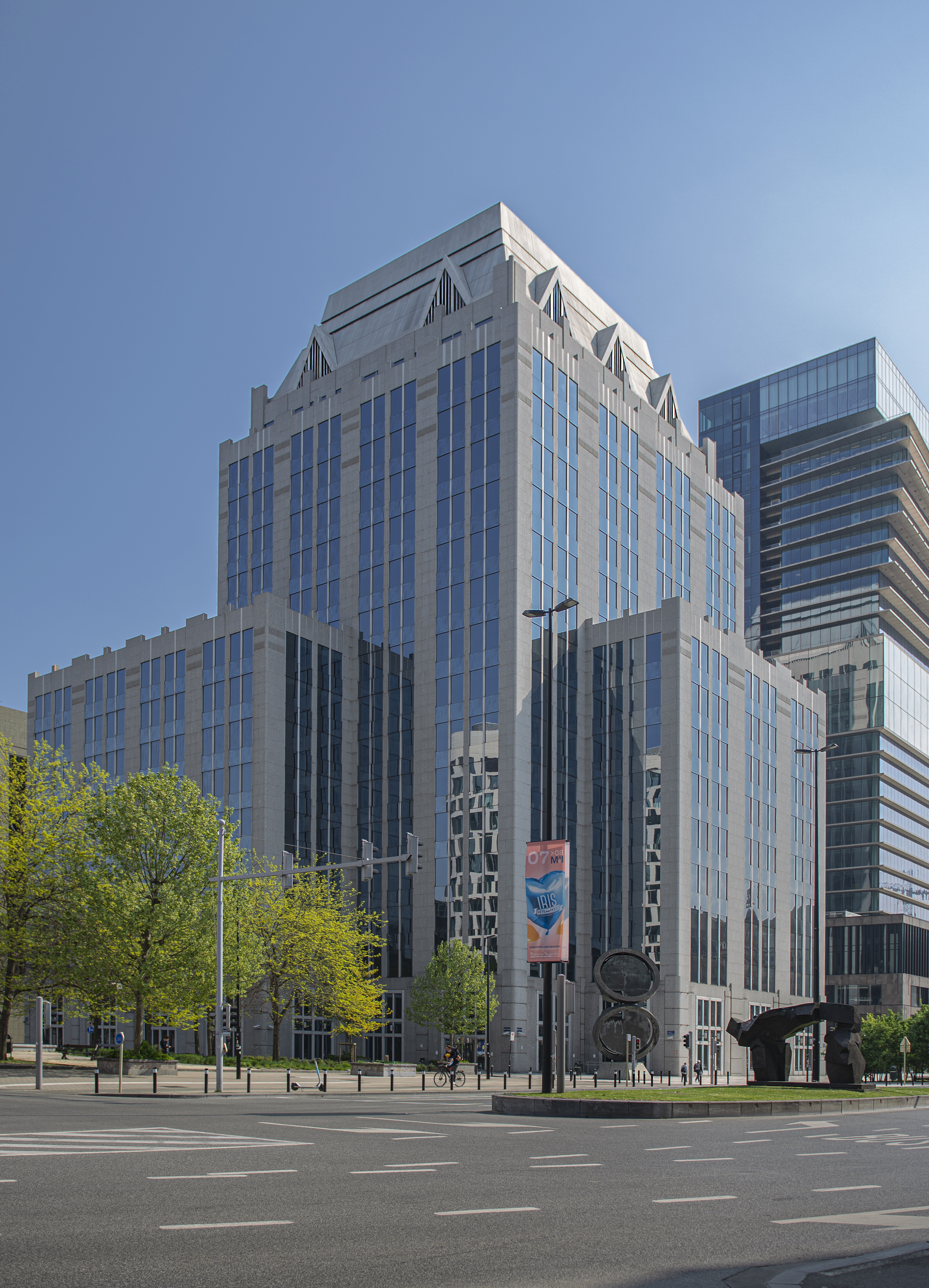
Euroclear head office, Brussels

The following list of banks in Belgium is to be understood within the framework of the European single market and European banking union, which means that Belgium's banking system is more open to cross-border banking operations than peers outside of the EU.

== Policy framework ==
European banking supervision distinguishes between significant institutions (SIs) and less significant institutions (LSIs), with SI/LSI designations updated regularly by the European Central Bank (ECB). Significant institutions are directly supervised by the ECB using joint supervisory teams that involve the national competent authorities (NCAs) of individual participating countries. Less significant institutions are supervised by the relevant NCA on a day-to-day basis, under the supervisory oversight of the ECB. In Belgium's case, the NCA is the National Bank of Belgium.

== Significant institutions ==
As of 1 September 2025, the list of supervised institutions maintained by the ECB included the following five Belgian banking groups as SIs, with names as indicated by the ECB for each group's consolidating entity:

- Investeringsmaatschappij Argenta NV / Société d'investissements Argenta SA / Investierungsgesellschaft Argenta AG
- The Bank of New York Mellon SA/NV, subsidiary of BNY
- Belfius Banque SA / Belfius Bank NV / Belfius Bank SA
- Crelan SA / Crelan NV
- KBC Group NV

In addition to these, other euro-area-based banking groups have significant operations in the country. A study published in 2024 assessed that the largest bank by assets in Belgium (as opposed to total consolidated assets) at end-2023 was BNP Paribas (€374 billion, via BNP Paribas Fortis and Fintro), followed by KBC (€225 billion), Belfius (€179 billion), ING Group (€128 billion), Argenta (€60 billion), Crelan (€54 billion), BNY (€40 billion), and Crédit Mutuel (€10 billion, via Beobank). BPCE and Crédit Agricole are also present via their respective acquisitions of Banque Nagelmackers and Degroof Petercam in 2024. Belgium is also home to subsidiaries of other euro-area significant institutions, namely MDB Group and UniCredit. By contrast, Euroclear Bank, whose balance sheet grew rapidly to more than €200 billion as a consequence of the European Union sanctions against Russia which were introduced in late February 2022, remains designated by the ECB as a LSI.

== Less significant institutions ==
As of 1 September 2025, the ECB's list of supervised institutions included 17 Belgian LSIs.

=== High-impact LSIs ===
Of these, three were designated as "high-impact" on the basis of several criteria including size:

- Euroclear Holding SA/NV, the parent company of the Euroclear Group
- FinAx NV, holding entity of Delen Private Bank (see below)
- vdk bank, a former local savings bank

Two additional entities owned by Euroclear Holding SA/NV, international central securities depository Euroclear Bank and intermediate holding company Euroclear SA, meet the criteria for SI designation but have been classified by the ECB as LSIs by special derogation, together with a handful of other financial market infrastructures.

=== Other euro-area LSIs ===
The other eight Belgian or euro-area-controlled LSIs were:

- Bank Dierickx Leys, a private bank
- Bank J. Van Breda en C^{o} NV, a private bank
- Banque Eni SA, subsidiary of Eni
- Datex Financial Holding, owner of BankB
  - BankB, a local savings bank (formerly CKV Bank)
- Banque CPH, a local cooperative group
- Delen Private Bank SA, subsidiary of FinAx NV (see above)
- Van De Put & Co Private Bankers

=== Non-euro-area-controlled LSIs ===
Based on the same ECB list, four Belgian LSIs were controlled by financial groups outside the euro area:

- (Lebanon) Byblos Bank Europe, subsidiary of Byblos Bank
- (Sweden) Belgian branch of Hoist Finance AB
- (Denmark) Belgian branch of Saxo Bank A/S
- United Taiwan Bank SA, subsidiary of Taiwan Cooperative Bank

== Third-country branches ==
As of 13 October 2025, the following banking groups established outside the European Economic Area had branches in Belgium ("third-country branches" in EU parlance):

- Bank of India
- State Bank of India
- (Japan) Sumitomo Mitsui Financial Group

== Other institutions ==
The National Bank of Belgium, which is half-owned by the Belgian government, is specifically exempted from EU banking law by the Capital Requirements Directives.

== Defunct banks ==
A number of former Belgian banks, defined as having been headquartered in the present-day territory of Belgium and its colonies, are documented on Wikipedia. They are listed below in chronological order of establishment.

- Banque Matthieu (1754-1928)
- Banque de Commerce (1780-1989)
- Bank Du Jardin (1801-1874)
- Société Générale de Belgique (1822-1934)
- Banque d'Anvers (1823-1965)
- Banque de Belgique (1835-1885)
- Banque Lambert (1835-1975)
- Banque Liégeoise (1835-c. 1940)
- Caisse Générale d'Épargne et de Retraite (1850-1999)
- Crédit Communal de Belgique (1860-1996)
- Gentsche Volksbank (1866-1905)
- Bank of Brussels (1871-1975)
- Banque Philippson (1871-2024)
- Caisse Générale de Reports et de Dépôts (1874-1953)
- Antwerpse Hypotheekkas (1881-1999)
- Banque Empain (1881-1961)
- CERA Bank (1892-1998)
- Crédit Anversois (1898-1941)
- Banque de Reports, de Fonds Publics et de Dépôts (1900-1919)
- Société Belge de Banque (1901-1965)
- Banque Belge pour l'Étranger (1902-2005)
- Bank van Roeselare-Tielt (1906-1919)
- Brugse Bank (1906-1919)
- Crédit Foncier d'Extrême-Orient (1907-1959)
- Banque du Congo Belge (1909-1960)
- Banque Italo-Belge (1911-c. 2000)
- Bank van de Arbeid (1913-1934)
- Société Nationale de Crédit à l'Industrie (1919-1997)
- Centrale Kredietkas voor de Middenstand (1923-1927)
- Belgische Arbeiderscoöperatie (1924-2001)
- Bank van Roeselare (1925-1998)
- Banque Belge d'Afrique (1929-1971)
- BKCP Bank (1929-2001)
- West-Vlaams Beroepskrediet (1930-2009)
- Antwerp Diamond Bank (1934-2014)
- Générale de Banque (1934-1999)
- Office Central de Crédit Hypothécaire (1936-2001)
- Landbouwkrediet (1937-2013)
- Hypotheek- en Spaarmaatschappij van Antwerpen (1938-1997)
- Bank of Issue in Belgium (1940-1945)
- Société Congolaise de Banque (1945-1970)
- Banque Centrale du Congo Belge et du Ruanda-Urundi (1952-1961)
- OBK-Bank (1956-2013)
- Banque Belgolaise (1960-2018)
- Bank Brussels Lambert (1975-2003)
- Royale Belge (1986-1999)
- Fortis Group (1990-2009)
- Optima Bank (1991-2016)
- bpost banque (1995-2024)
- Centea (1997-2013)
- Record Bank (2001-2016)
- Aion Bank (2019-2025)

== See also ==
- List of banks in the euro area
- List of banks in Europe
