= Office Central de Crédit Hypothécaire =

Former Belgian financial institution

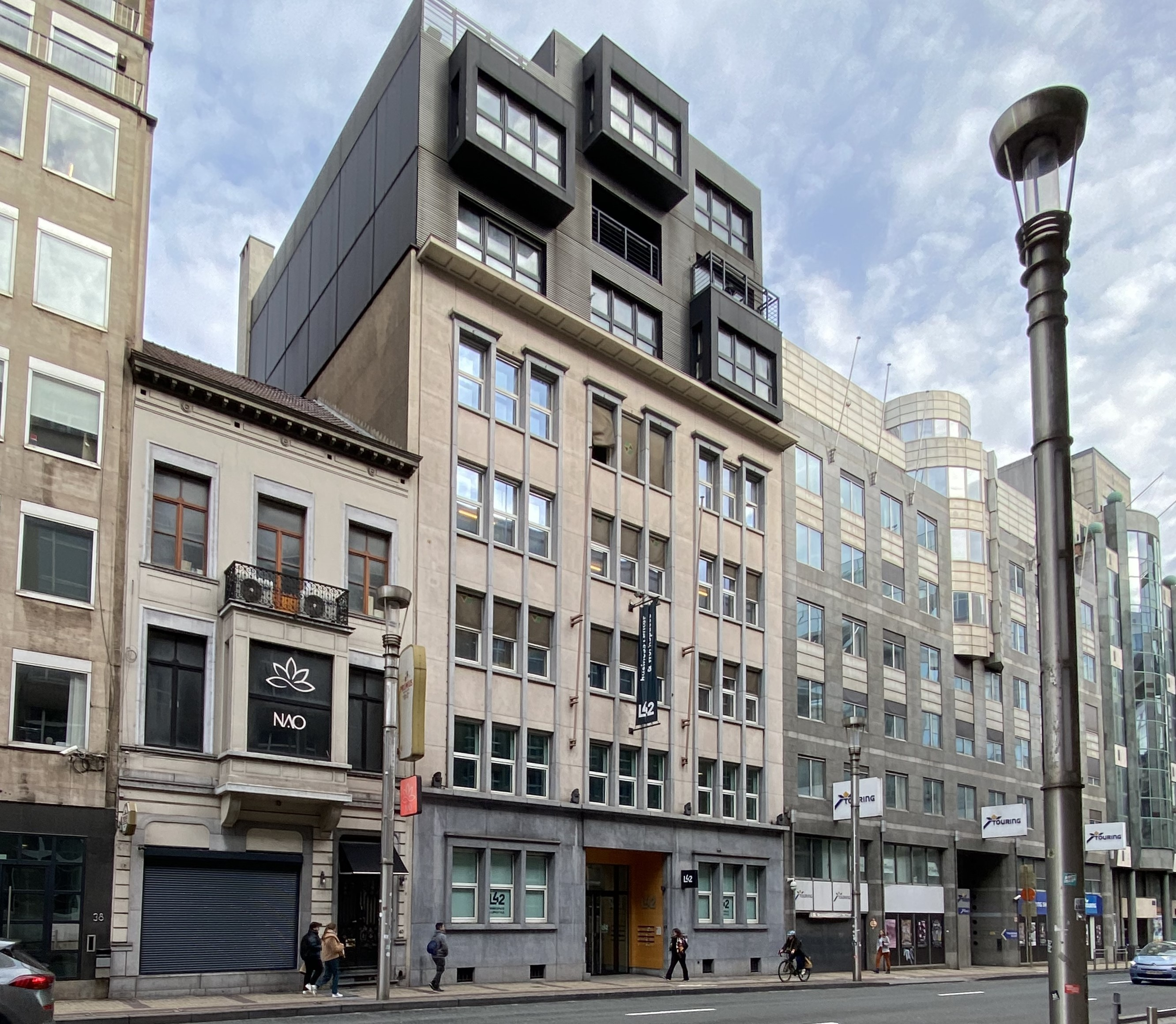
- Former OCCH/CBHK head office at Rue de la Loi 42 in Brussels, following renovation (including added floors on top) completed in 2014
- Native name: Centraal Bureau voor Hypothecair Krediet
- Company type: State owned company
- Industry: Financial services
- Founded: January 7, 1936
- Founder: Belgian Government
- Defunct: 2001
- Fate: Dissolved as no longer required with assets and brand sold off
- Successor: Stater NV, and Argenta
- Headquarters: Brussels, Belgium
- Area served: Belgium
- Products: Mortgages
- Owner: Belgium Government

the Office Central de Crédit Hypothécaire (Flemish: Centraal Bureau voor Hypothecair Krediet, acronymized as OCCH/CBHK, lit. 'Central Office for Mortgage Credit') was a Belgian public financial institution, created in 1936 to support mortgage credit. It was dismantled in 2000-2001.

== History ==
The Office was established by a decree of 7 January 1936, amended by a decree of 14 October 1937, aimed primarily to further the development of residential building for the middle classes, mostly by providing cheap credit assistance to existing mortgage credit organizations. The Belgian Treasury put 50 million Belgian francs at the disposal of the OCCH and it was authorized to issue bonds or notes under the guarantee of the Belgian state.

The OCCH's role and usefulness as a public-sector organization came into debate in the 1980s and 1990s. The Belgian government coalition agreement of 8 May 1988 foresaw a combination of public-sector banks, resulting in legislation of 17 June 1991 that mandated the integration of the Crédit Communal de Belgique, Société Nationale de Crédit à l'Industrie, and OCCH. The Crédit Communal, however, ensured that these provisions were not implemented.

In December 2000, the OCCH's profitable mortgage services were acquired by Dutch specialized financial institution Stater NV. In 2001, the rest of the business, including the OCCH's branch network and brand name, was acquired by Antwerp-based Argenta. The former OCCH's legal entity, holding a legacy portfolio of problem loans, was renamed as Credibe, and in 2018 was eventually merged into the Société Fédérale de Participations et d'Investissement, a holding company belonging to the Belgian government.

== See also ==
- Crédit Communal de Belgique
- Société Nationale de Crédit à l'Industrie
- List of banks in Belgium
