= Belfius =

Belgian banking chain

Belfius Bank and Insurance
- Belfius logo, introduced on March 1, 2012

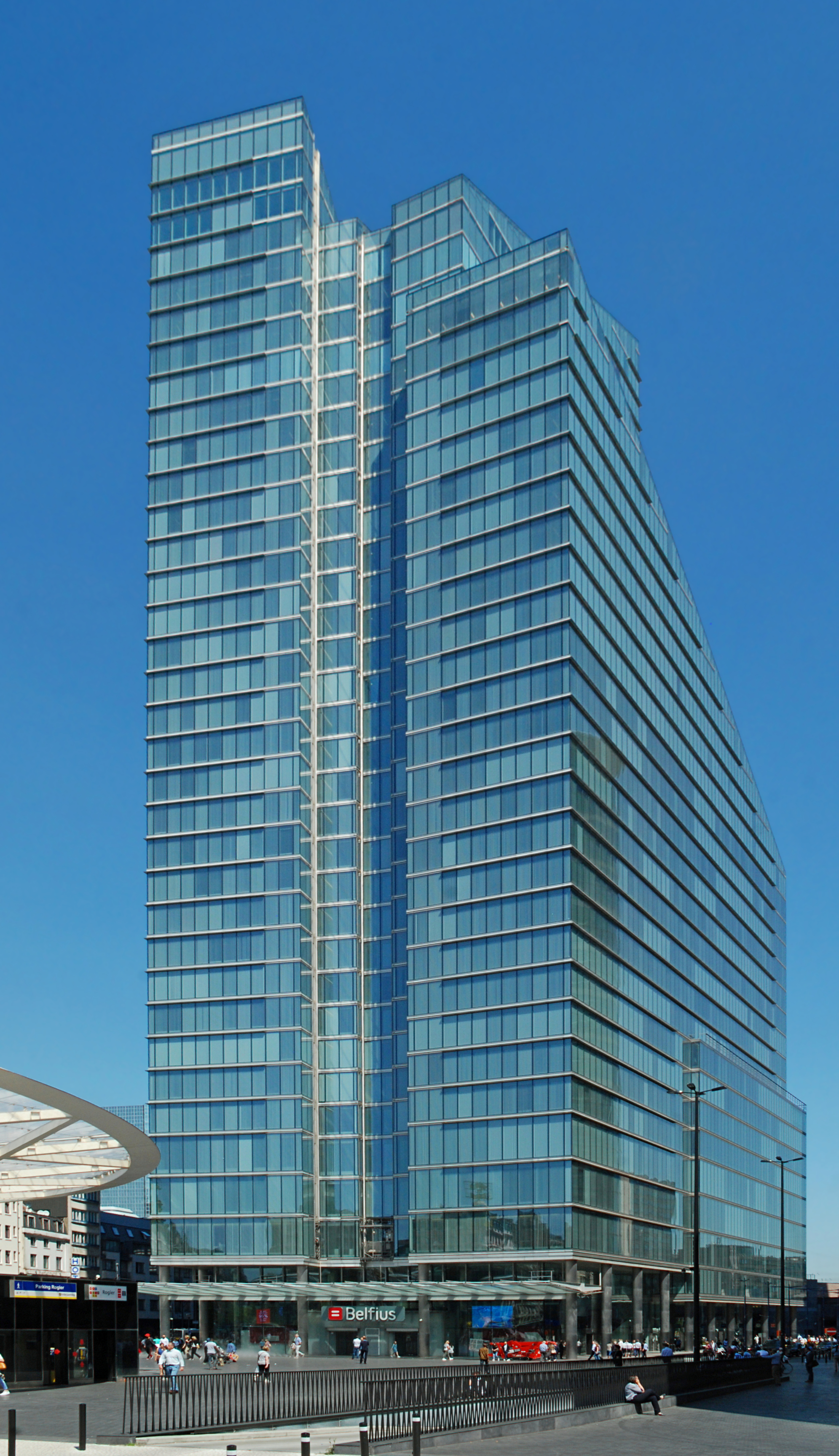
- Industry: Financial services
- Founded: 1996
- Headquarters: Place Charles Rogier 11, 1210 Saint-Josse-ten-Noode, Belgium
- Key people: Olivier Onclin (CEO), Jos Clijsters (Chairman of the Management Board)
- Products: Banking and insurance
- Net income: 535,000,000 euro (2016)
- Total assets: €192,855 billion (2025)
- Total equity: €12.83 billion (2024)
- Owner: Belgian State
- Website: www.belfius.com

Belfius Bank and Insurance, known as Dexia Bank Belgium until 1 March 2012, is a Belgian state-owned bank that emerged from the dismantling of the Dexia group which had been purchased by the Belgian government on 10 October 2011 for 4 billion euros.

Belfius has been designated as a Significant Institution since the entry into force of European Banking Supervision in late 2014, and as a consequence is directly supervised by the European Central Bank.

== History ==
=== Origins of Belfius ===
==== Belgium: Gemeentekrediet van België / Crédit Communal de Belgique ====
The Crédit Communal de Belgique (Dutch: Gemeentekrediet van België) was founded in 1860, specifically for the financing of local authority investments. Municipalities seeking to borrow are obliged to purchase shares equal in value to at least 5% of the borrowings. In 1947, the bank begins to develop a network of retail branches that allows funds to be drawn from the general public through savings accounts. From 1960 on, the branches are run by independent agents, allowing the offer of a broader range of services and products and the development of a lasting relationship with clients.

The international expansion of the bank starts in 1990, with the creation of the Cregem International Bank, specialising in the management of large sums of money, in the Grand Duchy of Luxembourg.

In 1990, Gemeentekrediet builds on its international expansion by taking a 25% stake in the Banque Internationale à Luxembourg (BIL), the biggest bank in Luxembourg. In early 1992, the firm increases its stake in BIL to 51%.

==== Belgium: BACOB / Artesia ====
The Coopération Ouvrière Belge (COB), the precursor of Banque BACOB and Les AP, is founded in 1924. In 1997, BACOB bank takes the majority stakeholding in Banque Paribas Belgium, which then becomes Artesia Bank. The new group – comprising retail bank (BACOB), insurance company (Les AP), investment bank (Banque Artesia) and asset manager (Cordius), takes the name Artesia Banking Corporation in 1999.

==== Dexia: Group ====
In 1996, Gemeentekrediet / Credit Communal de Belgique (presided over by François Narmon) merges with Crédit Local de France to form Dexia. In 1997, Dexia takes a 40% stake in Crediop, Italy’s biggest privately owned bank, specialising in finance for local administrations. Dexia increases its shareholding in Crediop to 60% in 1998.

The first listing of Dexia Group as a dual-listed company on the Paris stock exchanges dates from November 1999, at a price of €6.86 per share. In Belgium, the stock becomes part of the BEL20 index, and in France of the CAC 40. The group broadens its insurance activities in France, Belgium and Germany.

In 2000, the bank acquires Financial Security Assurance (FSA) in the United States, a major player in credit enhancement for municipalities, making Dexia the world leader in the marketing of financial services to the public sector. Dexia is active in nearly all European countries in this market as well. This marks the start of an annual reserved capital injection to which only Dexia members of staff can subscribe.

In 2001, Dexia acquires Artesia Banking Corporation, a banking group active in retail banking (BACOB), insurance (LAP), investment banking (Artesia) and asset management (Cordius). The stake in Crediop grows to 70%, and Dexia becomes main shareholder in Otzar Hashilton Hamekomi, an Israeli credit provider for local authorities. The integration of the Artesia branches in Belgium begins in 2002. The fusion between Dexia Bank and Artesia BC brings a certain number of advantages all the while meeting certain objectives: increase retail customer base from 15 to 25%, become a market leader in bancassurance, become a fully fledged participant in private banking activities, become one of the top 3 asset managers on the Belgian market and remain the leading bank in the public and non-profit sector.

Dexia acquires 99.8% of the Turkish firm Denizbank in 2006 and creates an Institutional Investment Joint Venture with Royal Bank of Canada the same year: a 50/50 Partnership called RBC Dexia Investor Services.

==== Management Committee ====
On 5 September 2011, Jos Clijsters, at the time adviser to the Dexia SA management committee, is appointed chairman of the management committee of Dexia Bank Belgium, replacing Stefaan Decraene, who leaves the group to assume an international post at another bank.

On 1 January 2014, Jos Clijsters left his position as Chairman of the Management Board for the position of Chairman of the Board of Directors. Marc Raisière succeeded him as Chairman of the Management Board.

==== Bailout and purchase by the Belgian State ====
On 4 October 2011, in the wake of a series of negative news, in the space of one day customers withdrew 300 million Euros from the bank. In response to this news, the Belgian and French governments, declaring themselves guarantors of the bank, decided to split the company to save the healthy parts and isolate the toxic parts.

On 10 October 2011, the takeover of Dexia Group’s Belgian subsidiary, Dexia Bank Belgium, by the Belgian State, was announced. This was completed at a cost of EUR 3.73 billion (270 million short of 4 billion). The Belgian State also decided to take a 60.5% stake in the financial guarantee mechanism for Dexia SA (60.5% of 90 billion, i.e., 54.45 billion).

On 1 March 2012, Dexia Bank Belgium became Belfius Bank and Insurance. The new name Belfius comprises the "Bel" of "Belgium", the "fi" of "finances" and the English pronoun "us".

On 19 March 2012, Dexia shares were removed from the BEL 20.

=== New acquisitions & partial privatization (since 2025) ===
In May 2025, Belfius acquired a 33% stake in Candriam, an asset management firm that was initially created by Dexia in the 1990s (as Dexia Asset Management) and bought by New York Life Investments in 2014.

In July 2025, the Belgian government instructed Belfius management to prepare for a partial privatization, with the eventual sale of 20% of the shares in order to raise around €2 billion to finance military expenses. In December 2025, the Belgian government officially approved the partial privatization of Belfius, with the sale of a 20% stake planned for the Fall of 2026

In June 2026, Belfius acquired French insurer Leocare, thus expanding its insurance business in France.

== See also ==
- Belfius Art Collection
- List of banks in Belgium
- List of banks in the euro area
