= Banque de Belgique =

Former Belgian bank

- Type: Private company
- Industry: Banking
- Founded: February 26, 1835 in Brussels, Belgium
- Founder: Charles de Brouckère
- Defunct: 1885
- Fate: Liquidated in 1885 after financial failure
- Headquarters: Brussels, Belgium

The Banque de Belgique (lit. 'Bank of Belgium') was a major bank in Belgium, founded in 1835 and eventually wound up in 1885 after experiencing multiple episodes of financial distress.

== Overview ==
The Banque de Belgique was founded by liberal leader Charles de Brouckère on 26 February 1835. The aim was to partly offset the financial dominance in the country of the Société Générale de Belgique which was viewed as not providing savings services to the broader Belgian population, and was also perceived as too much controlled by Dutch interests. Adolphe Oppenheim was among the new bank's founding shareholders, alongside the French Banque Rothschild. De Brouckère presented the new bank as a philanthropic endeavor, in line with the savings banks movement. The two banks were in direct competition in some segments of their activity, including note issuance which was not yet a monopoly.

Starting in 1837 the Banque of Belgique experienced financial difficulties, in the context of territorial disagreements between Belgium and the Netherlands that would be eventually settled by the Treaty of London (1839). At the end of 1838, it suspended its activities and had to seek credit support from the Belgian government, which was granted by legislation of 839/01/01. In 1841, upon renewed financial stress, Jonathan-Raphaël Bischoffsheim saved the bank from bankruptcy by subscribing for ten million shares. In 1842 the Banque de Belgique renounced its role as fiscal agent of the Belgian government that had been granted to it in 1835, which thus temporarily returned to the Société Générale.

In 1848, international financial stress led the Belgian government to grant the bank's notes legal tender status and to suspend their convertibility, as it also did with the Société Générale. In 1850, with the aim of restoring monetary stability, statesman Walthère Frère-Orban fostered the creation of the National Bank of Belgium, in which both the Société Générale and the Banque de Belgique were founding shareholders, after which both ceased to issue banknotes of their own.

The Banque de Belgique remained one of Belgium's two dominant banks, behind the Société Générale, during the next quarter-century. In 1875, however, it once again went into distress after having participated in financing failed industrialist Simon Philippart. The orderly liquidation of the Banque de Belgique was initiated in 1876 by a consortium of the country's other large banks, and completed in 1885. None of the bank's depositors incurred losses.

== Leadership ==
Frédéric Fortamps was governor of the Banque de Belgique between 1873 and 1876.

== See also ==
- Banque Liégeoise
- Léandre Desmaisières
- List of banks in Belgium
