= François Narmon =

François, Baron Narmon (26 January 1934 – 14 March 2013) was a Belgian businessman and president of Dexia Group and the Belgian Olympic Committee. From 2002 until 2004 he was a member of the International Olympic Committee.

Born in Jette, Narmon obtained a licentiate degree as commercial engineer from the Université libre de Bruxelles (École de commerce Solvay). He lectured on accountancy at the Université libre de Bruxelles and the Vrije Universiteit Brussel, and made the local Gemeentekrediet into the financial enterprise Dexia. He died on 14 March 2013 in Meise.

== Sources ==
- François Narmon
- François Narmon
- François Narmon's obituary (in Dutch)
