= BNG Bank =

Dutch bank

BNG Bank N.V.
- Company type: Private
- Industry: Financial services
- Founded: 1914; 112 years ago
- Headquarters: The Hague, Netherlands
- Key people: Philippine Risch, CEO
- Products: Financing for (semi-)public organisations
- Operating income: ▼€459 million (2018)
- Net income: ▼€337 million (2006)
- Total assets: €94.2 billion (Q3 2025)
- Number of employees: 302 (2019)
- Website: www.bngbank.nl

BNG Bank N.V. is a Dutch bank specializing in providing financing for (semi-)publicly owned organizations. Ranked by assets alone, it is ranked as the 4th bank in the Netherlands. The Dutch state owns 50% of the company, while the remainder is owned by the municipalities and provinces.

== History ==
The company was founded in 1914 in The Hague as the Gemeentelijke Credietbank (Municipal Credit Bureau) in 1922 and then changed its name to Bank voor Nederlandsche Gemeenten (lit. 'Bank for the Dutch Municipalities') in the 1990s, before finally changing it to BNG Bank in 2018.

BNG Bank does not provide financing to private customers, but exclusively to (semi-)public organizations, such as municipalities, provinces, public utilities, health care organisations and public housing.

BNG has been designated as a Significant Institution since the entry into force of European Banking Supervision in late 2014, and as a consequence is directly supervised by the European Central Bank.

== Awards ==
The magazine Global Finance rated BNG Bank the third safest bank in the world in its list of "World’s 50 Safest Banks 2019". The rating is based on long-term foreign currency ratings from Fitch Ratings and Standard and Poor’s and the long-term bank deposit ratings from Moody’s Investors Service.

== See also ==
- List of banks in the euro area
- List of banks in the Netherlands
