= Onderlinge van 1719 u.a. =

Dutch life insurance company

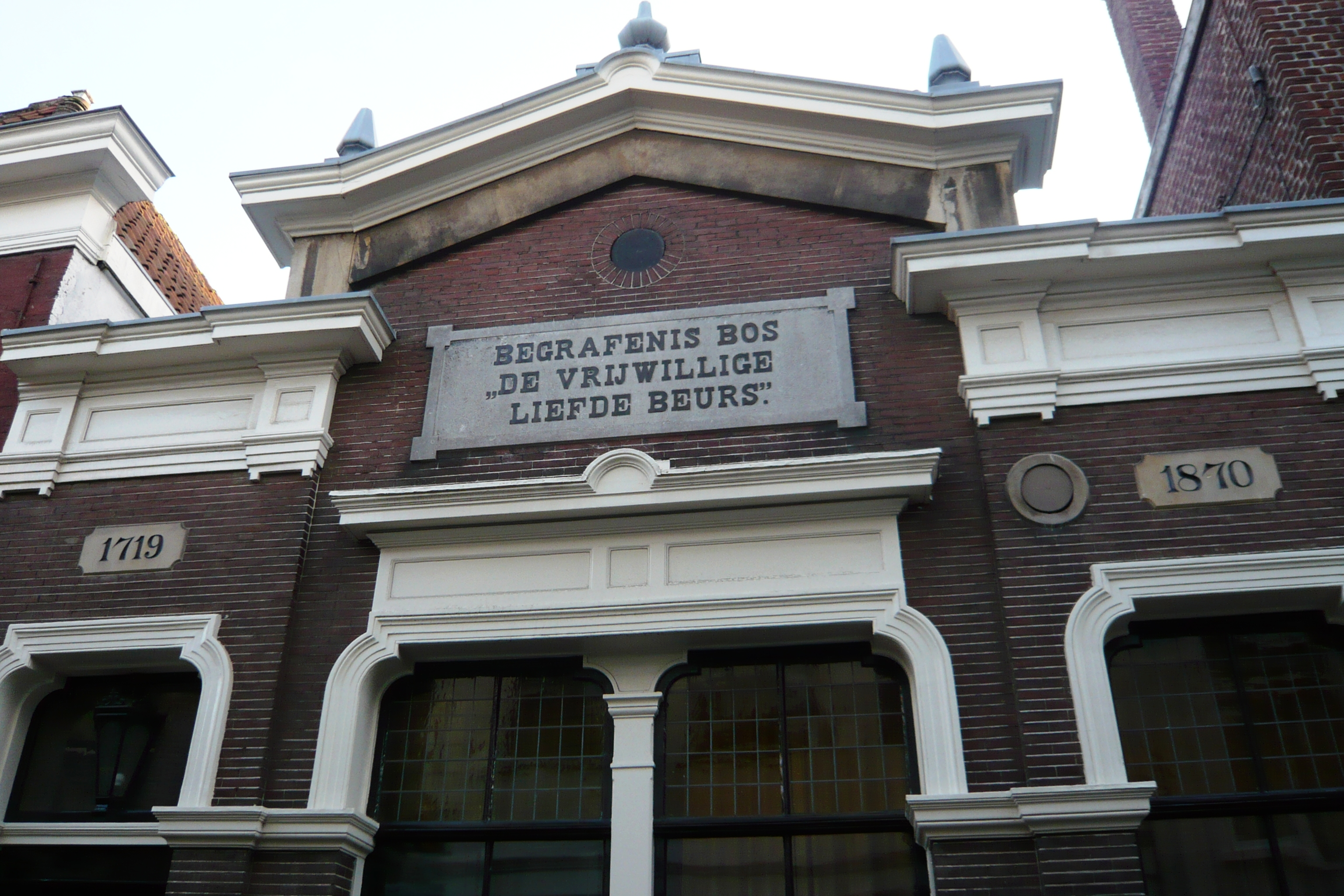
"De Vrijwillige Liefde Beurs"

The Onderlinge van 1719 u.a. was a life insurance firm on the Korte Begijnestraat 14 in Haarlem, Netherlands. It was the oldest independent life insurance firm in the Netherlands. In October 2025 the company announced its closure after 306 years of operation.

== History ==
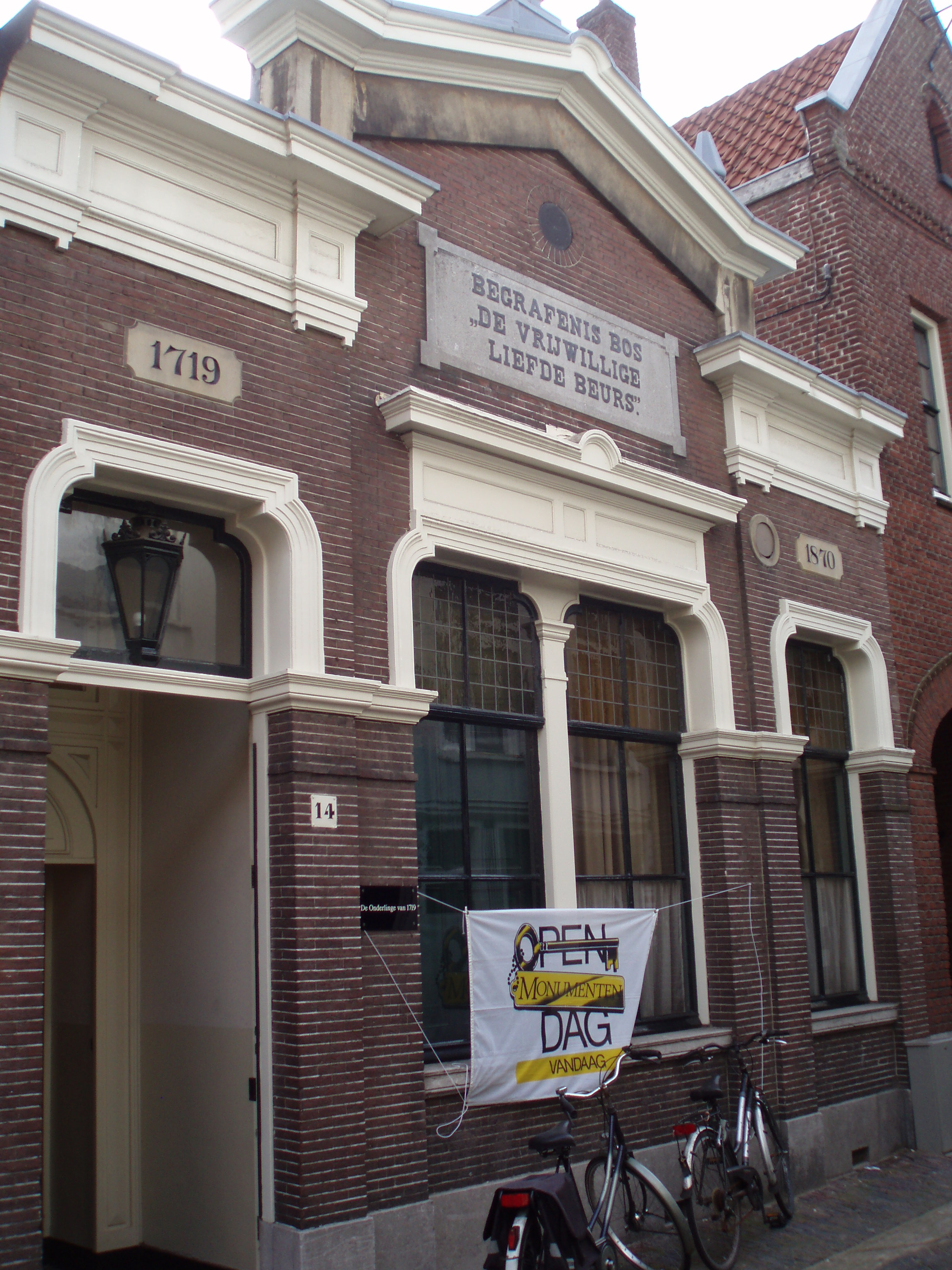
Number 14 Korte Begijnestraat, Haarlem

The fund was founded on 12 February 1719 as a "begrafenisbos" or funeral insurance firm. The old name was "Begrafenisbos De Vrijwillige Liefdebeurs", with the motto "In Alles Ghetrou" (faithful in everything). This is the name that is on the facade of the building, which was designed in 1870–1871 by the Haarlem architect Adrianus van der Steur (1836–1899). The company was first located at the neighboring building, Korte Begijnestraat 16. After an argument with the neighbour, a baker whose oven "made the meetings of the society overheated", the company decided to solve the mutual problem between the neighbour and the fund by buying the neighbour's house. That house was bought and then renovated to create the current building. The building is currently located between the Schuur and the Hofje van Bakenes. On occasion of the 300th anniversary of the firm, the Haarlem Opera staged an opera, named De Liefdesbeurs, dedicated to the firm.

== Fund and building ==
The board of the fund consisted of 10 to 15 citizens of Haarlem. They were volunteers. The office of the fund was open every Friday evening from 19:00 to 22:00. Originally the board would meet on Sunday afternoon, after going to church, but in 1935 Friday evening was chosen. The fund served as a full-fledged funeral insurance firm and the company was in very good financial shape. For the fact that the building is a good example of the oeuvre of A. van der Steur, as well as the fact that the company operated over 300 years under the same charter for which it was formed, both numbers 14 and 16 have rijksmonument status. In October 2025 its closure was announced. The main reason was that compliance costs were getting too heavy for a small, independent insurance company. Dutch insurance company A.S.R. announced the takeover of 2200 clients with a portfolio totalling 9 million Euros.
