= Fortis Group =

Global financial services group (1990–2010)

Fortis N.V./S.A. (Belgium) Fortis N.V. (Netherlands)

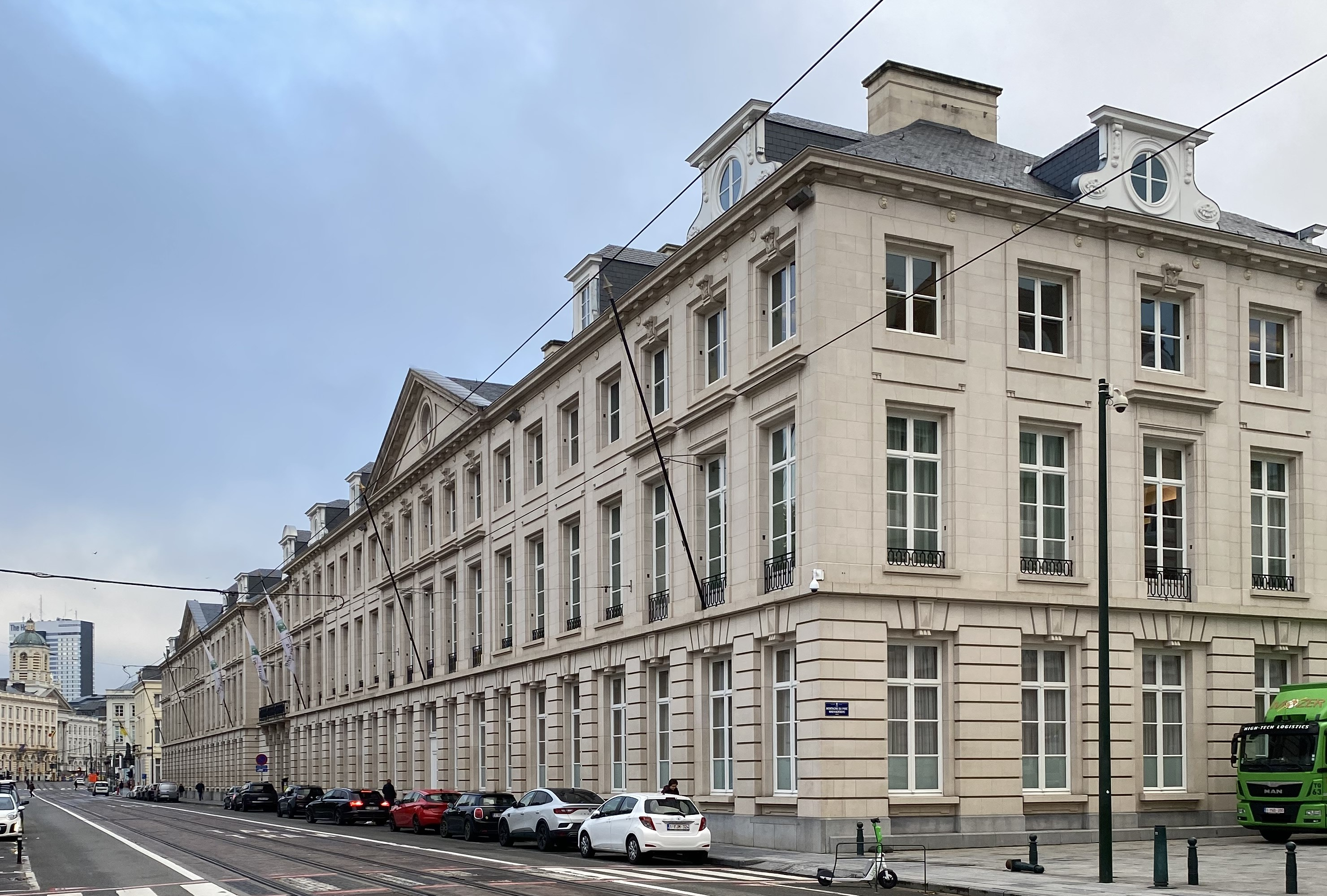
- Set of buildings on Rue Royale in Brussels, the headquarters of Fortis during the 2000s and previously seat of the Société Générale de Belgique
- Type: Naamloze vennootschap / Société anonyme
- Industry: Financial services
- Founded: 1990; 36 years ago
- Defunct: 2010
- Fate: Non-insurance activities sold, remaining operations renamed Ageas
- Successor: BNP Paribas Fortis (Belgian banking); Fortis Bank Nederland (Dutch banking); Ageas (insurance); ASR Nederland (Dutch insurance)
- Headquarters: Brussels, Belgium; Utrecht, Netherlands
- Products: Retail, commercial, private and investment banking, insurance, asset management
- Website: fortis.com at the Wayback Machine (archived 2007-02-02)

Fortis N.V./S.A., was a Benelux-centered global financial services group active in insurance, banking and investment management, initially formed in 1990 by a three-way Belgian-Dutch merger and headquartered in Brussels. It grew rapidly through multiple acquisitions, and in 2007 was the 20th largest financial services business in the world by revenue. It was listed on the Euronext Brussels, Euronext Amsterdam, and Luxembourg stock exchanges.

Fortis encountered severe problems in the 2008 financial crisis, not least as a consequence of participating in 2007 in the joint acquisition of ABN AMRO together with Royal Bank of Scotland Group and Banco Santander. It received an emergency bailout from the governments of Belgium and the Netherlands and was broken up soon thereafter. As a consequence:

- Fortis Bank Nederland was nationalised by the Dutch government and merged in July 2010 with ABN AMRO's former Dutch operations, which had not yet been integrated with Fortis following the 2007 takeover, to form a new group also called ABN AMRO;
- the other banking operations were acquired in 2008 by BNP Paribas and became part, respectively, of BNP Paribas Fortis (retaining the Fortis brand) in Belgium, BGL BNP Paribas in Luxembourg, BNP Paribas Bank Polska in Poland, and Türk Ekonomi Bankası in Turkey;
- Fortis's Dutch insurance operations were reorganized as ASR Nederland, the name of a Dutch insurer which Fortis had acquired in 1997;
- the remaining insurance operations, still the largest in Belgium, were rebranded to Ageas in April 2010.

As of 2022, the Fortis brand name is still used by BNP Paribas in Belgium, but its colorful logo was discontinued in 2009 shortly after the acquisition.

== History ==
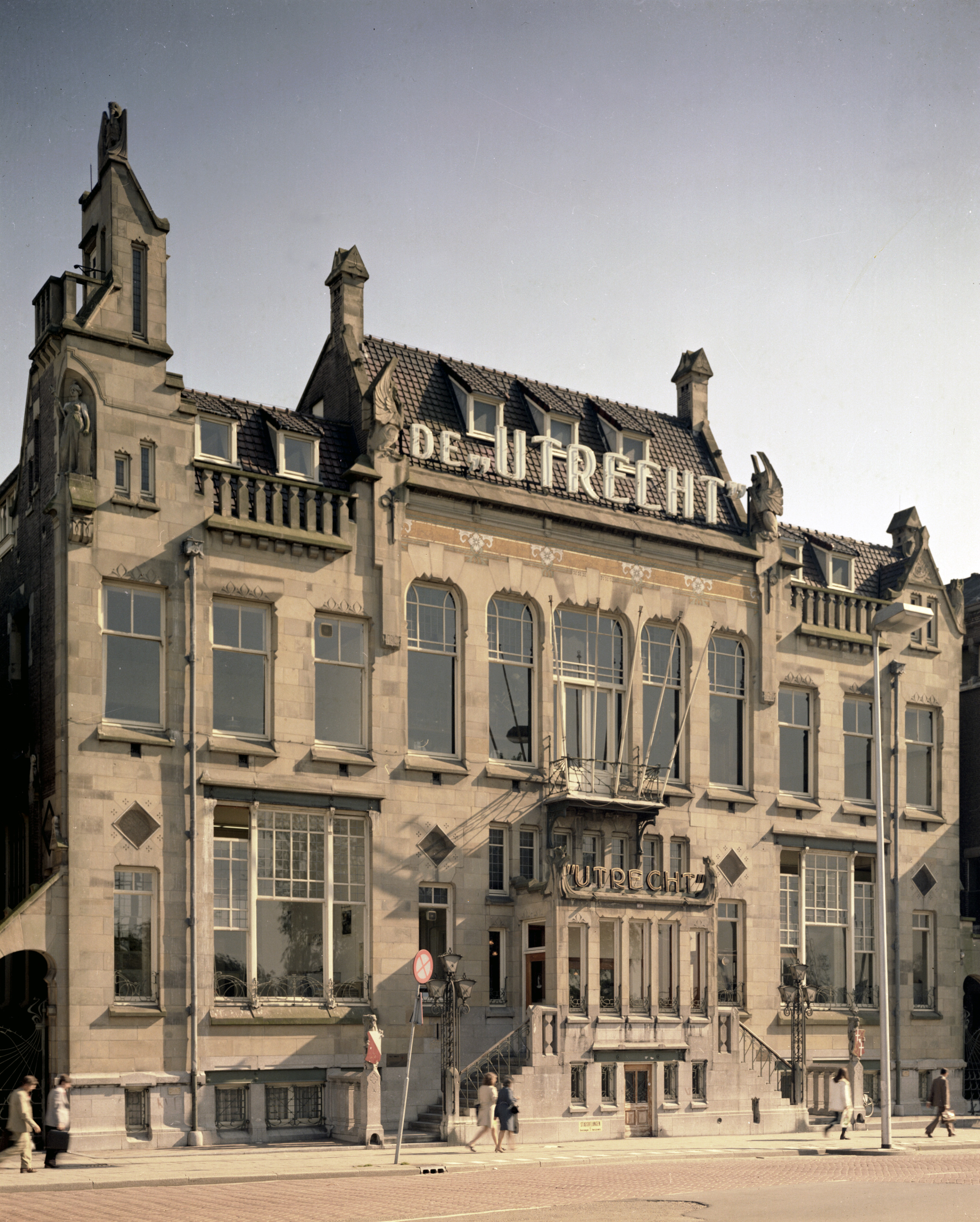
Former head office of De Utrecht insurance company, shortly before demolition in 1974

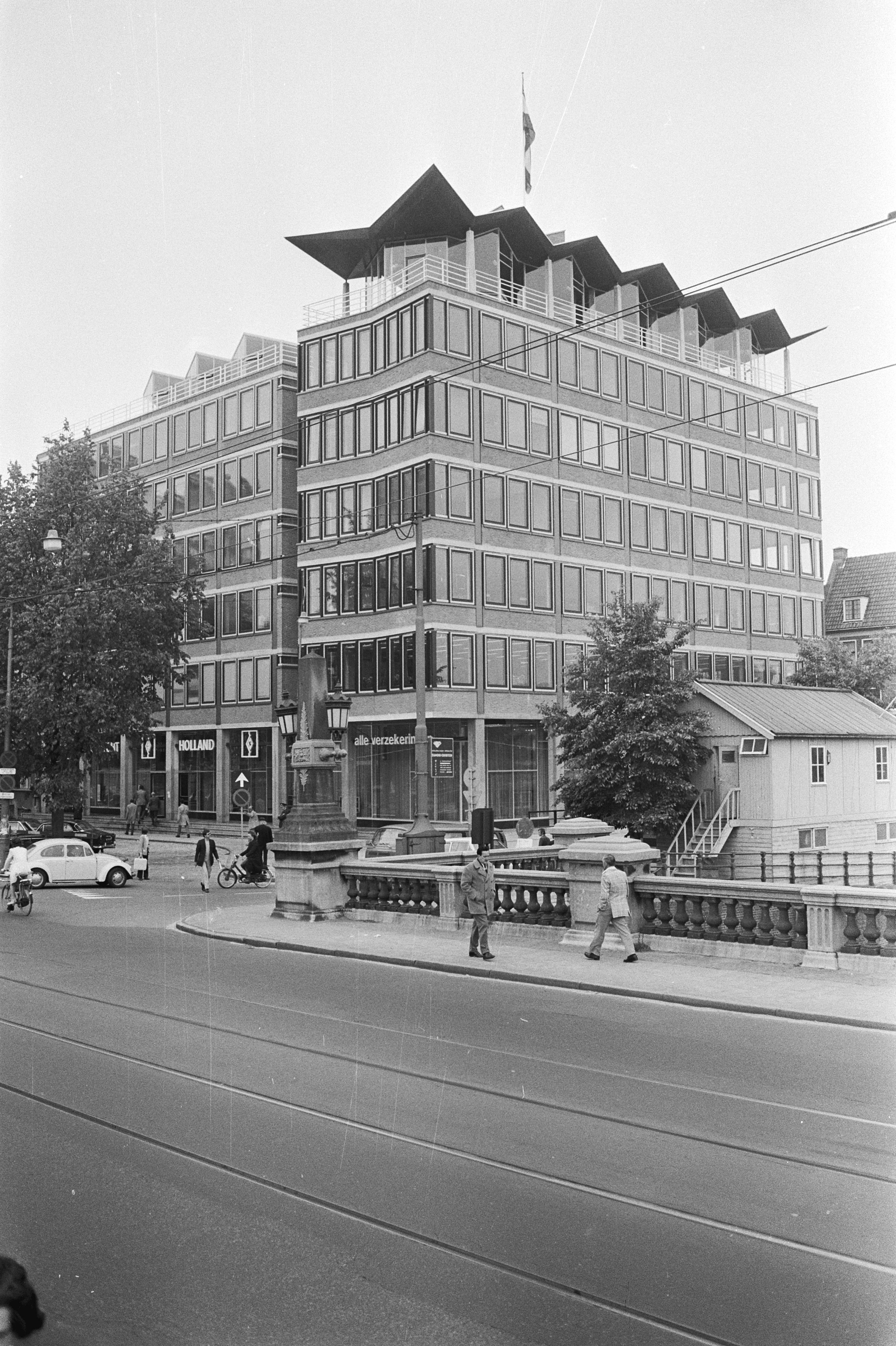
AMEV main office in Amsterdam, 1971

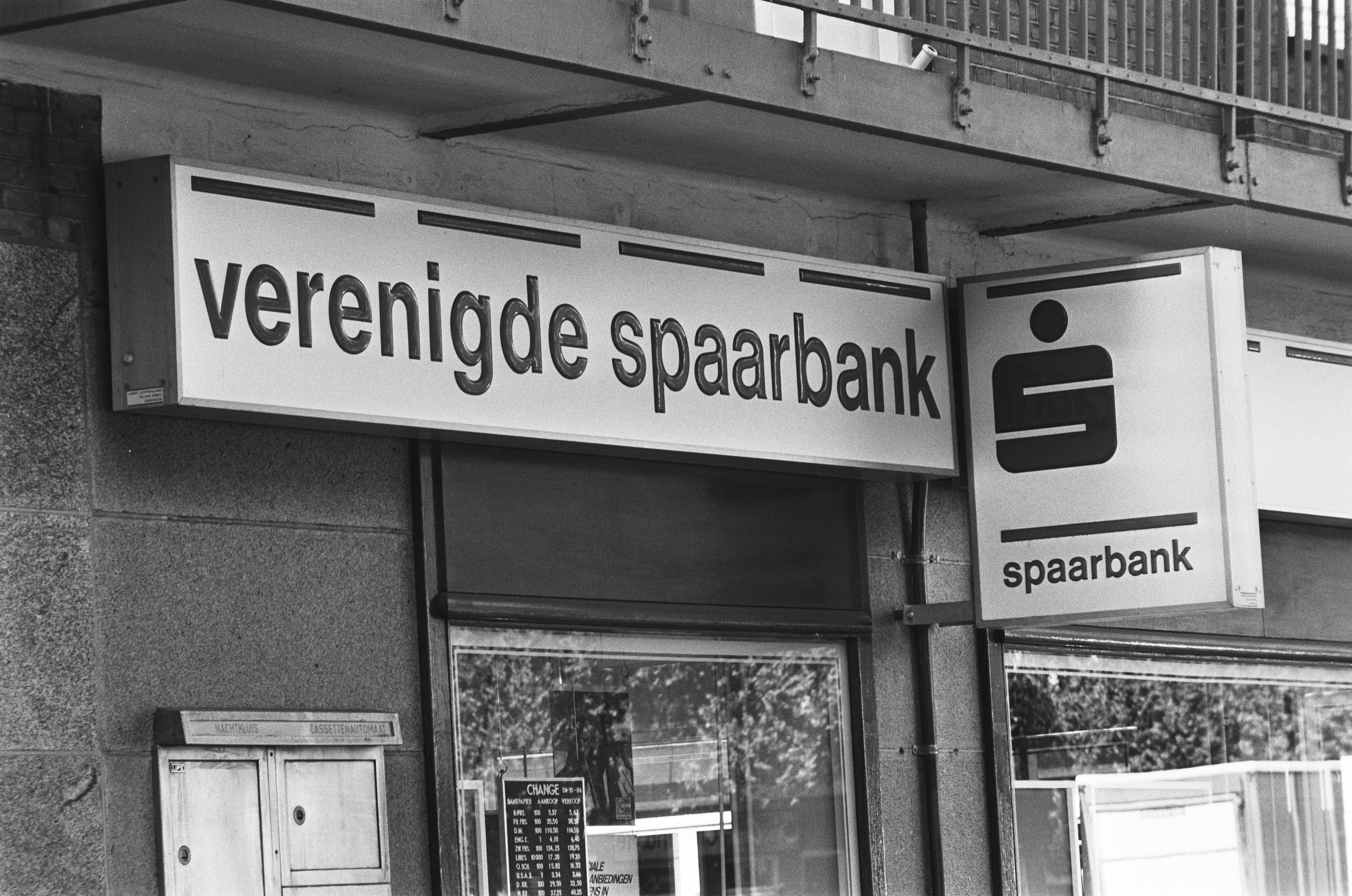
VSB Group sign with the Dutch savings banks logo, 1984

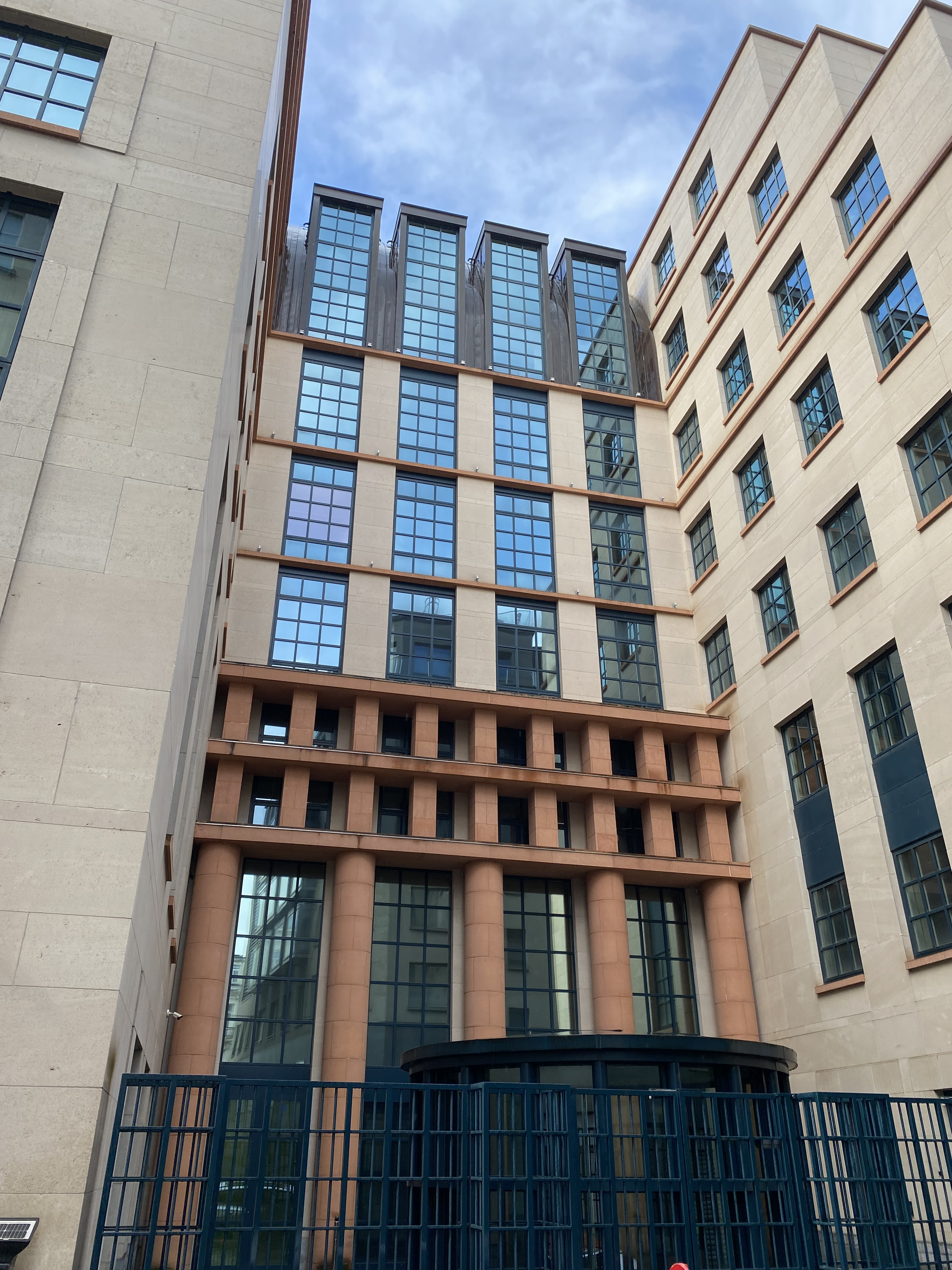
Headquarters of AG Insurance designed by Michael Graves in downtown Brussels, completed in 2003

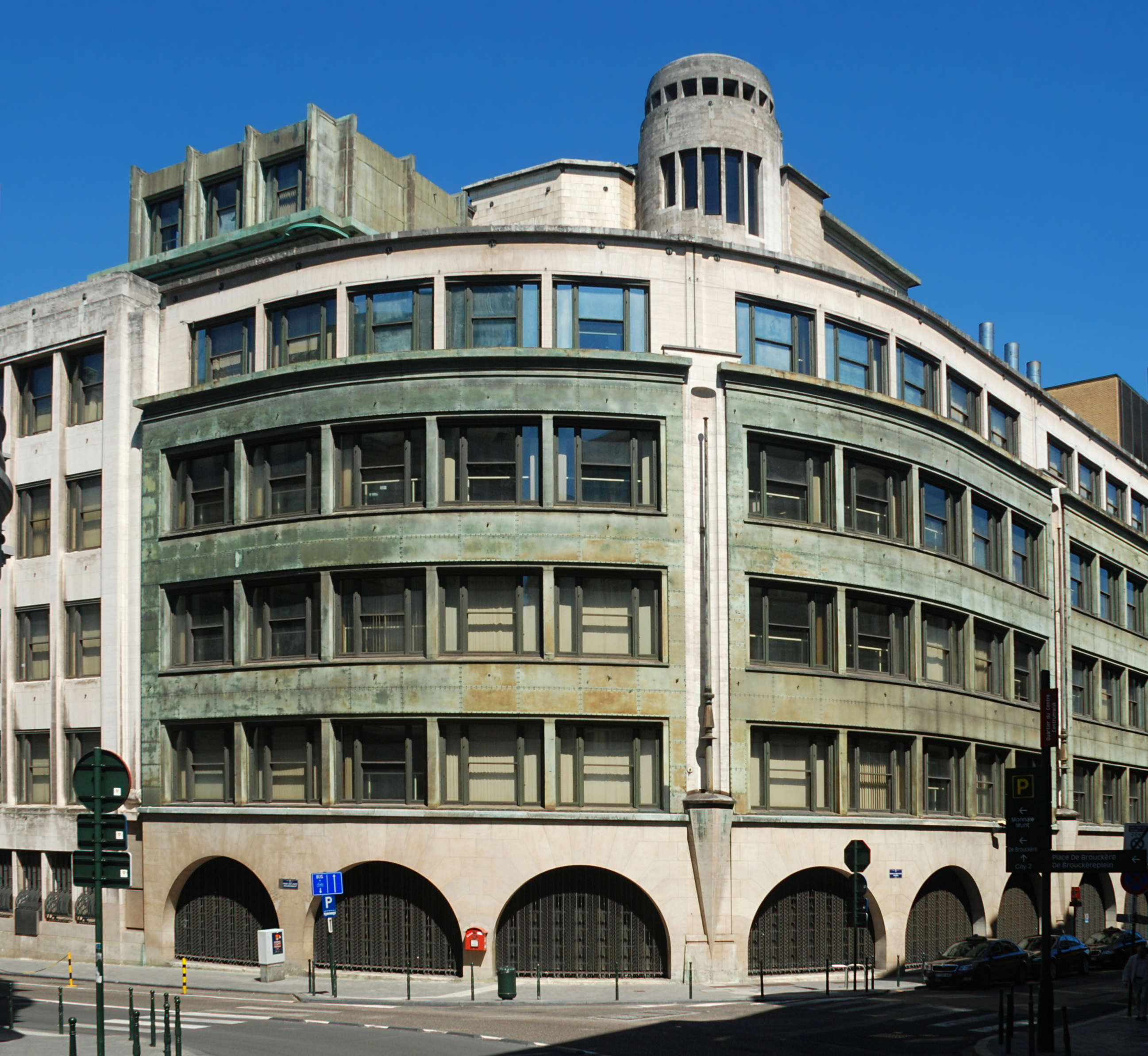
Former head office of ASLK / CGER in Brussels, 2012

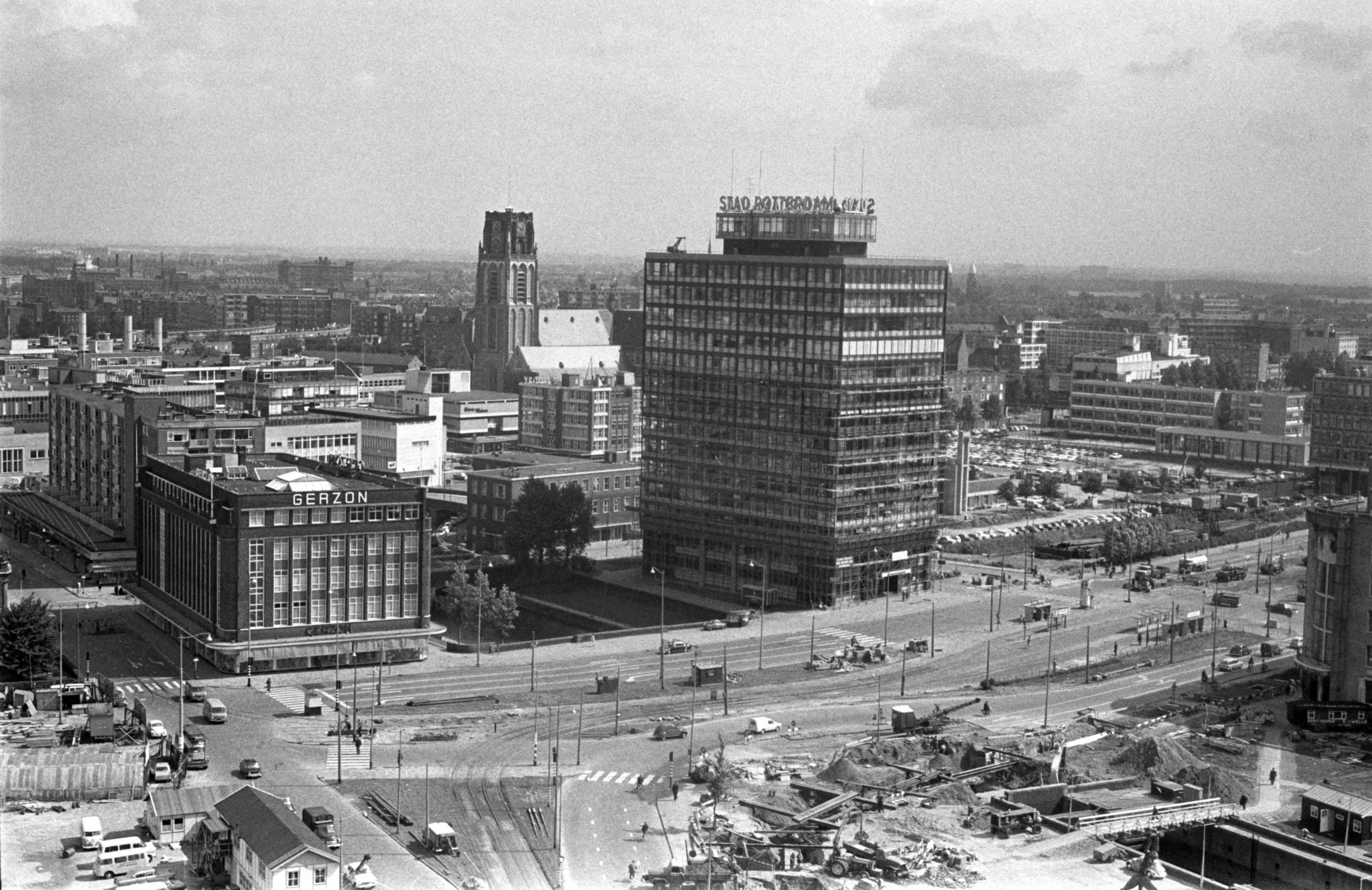
Head office building of Stad Rotterdam Verzekeringen (center) in 1967

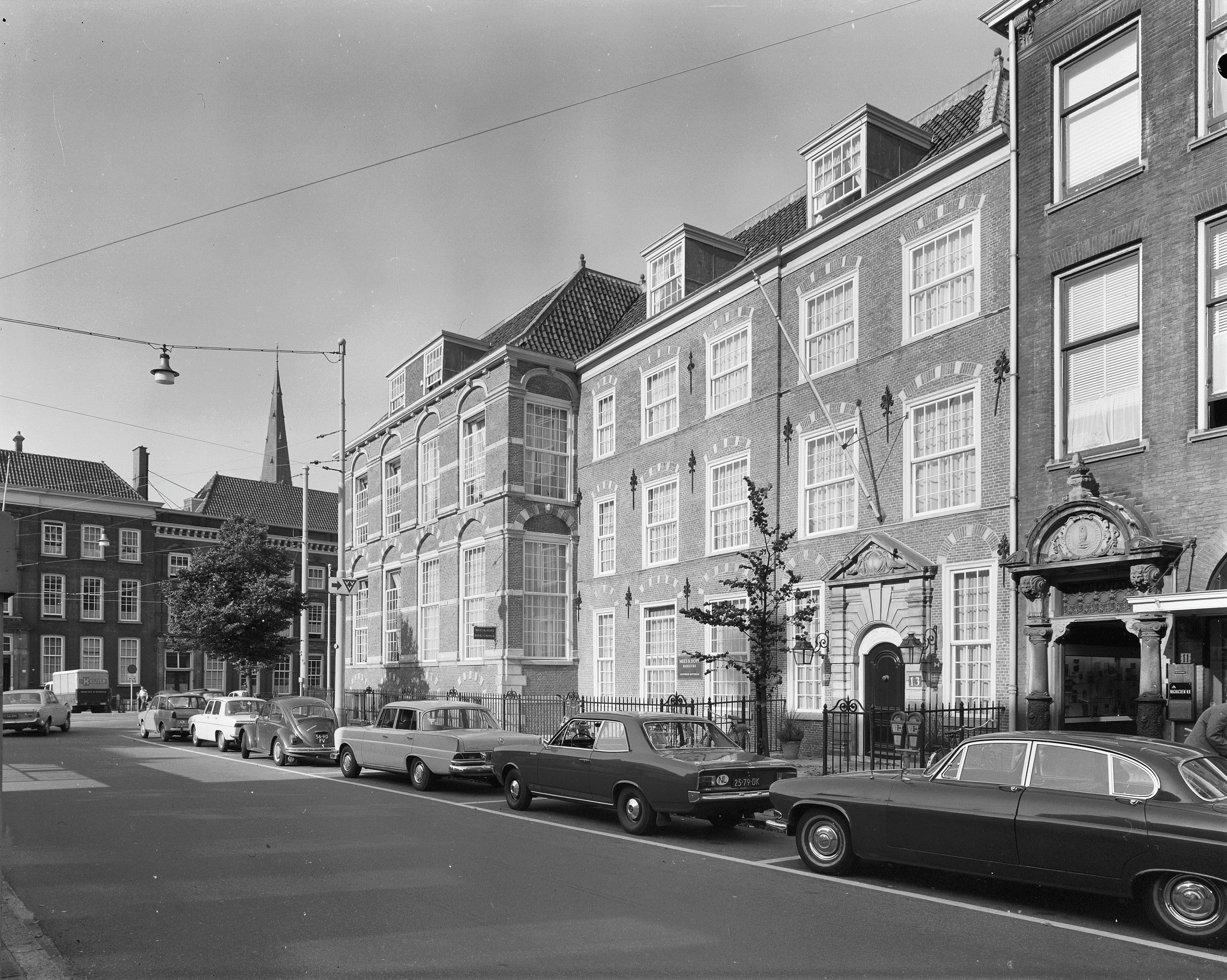
Former MeesPierson office at Kneuterdijk 13, The Hague

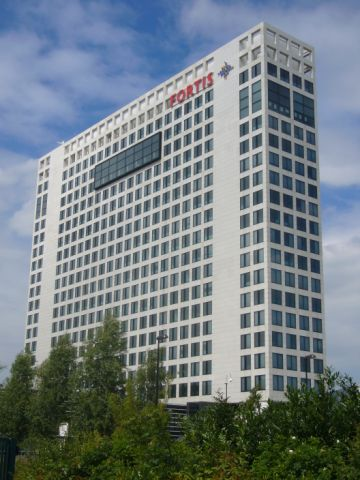
Fortis Bank Nederland head office in Utrecht, 2008

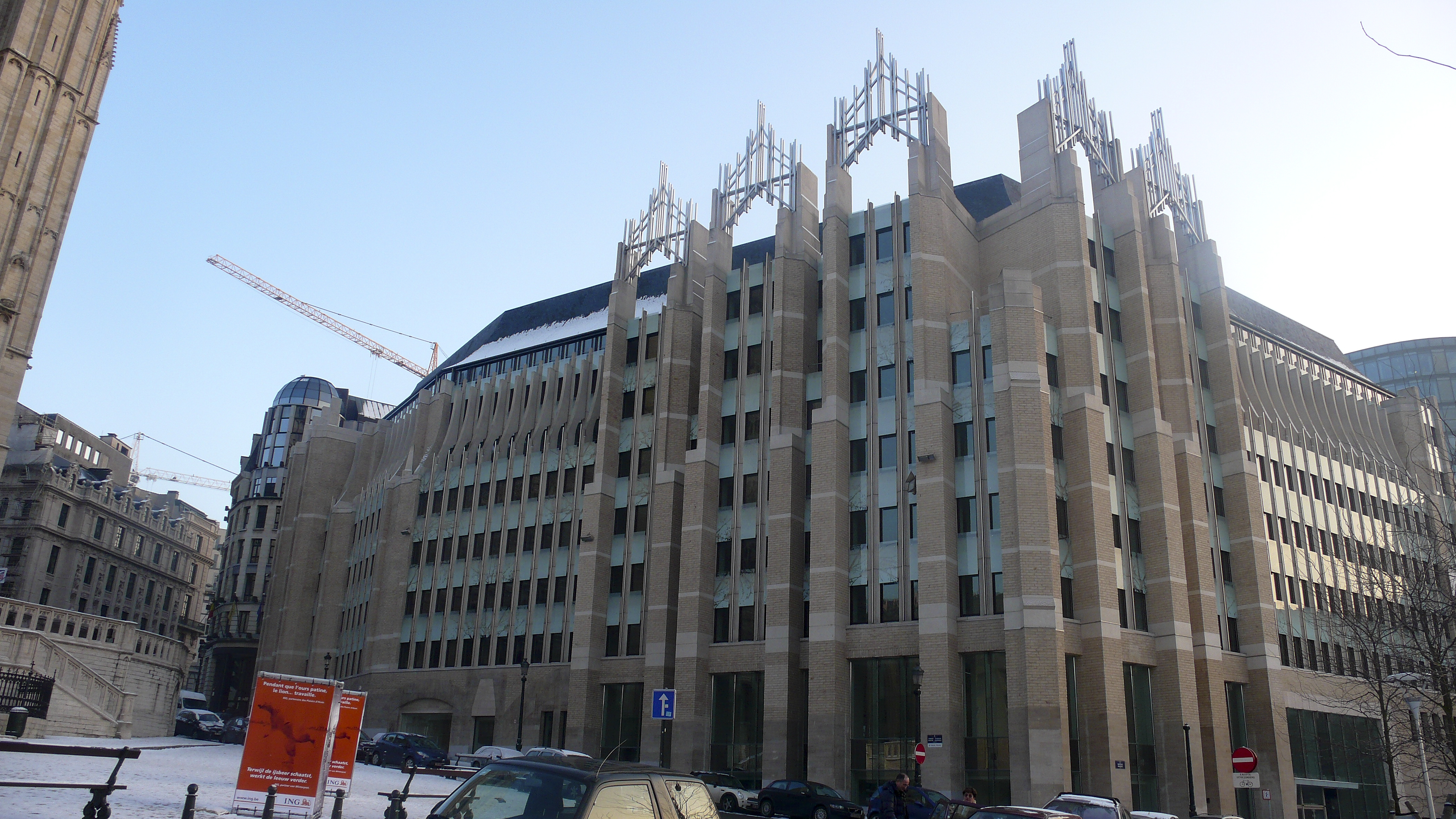
Head office of Ageas in Brussels, 2010

Creation and early expansion

Fortis came into being in 1990, as the result of a merger of insurer AMEV (for Algemeene Maatschappij tot Exploitatie van Verzekeringsmaatschappijen, formerly Levensverzekering-maatschappij Utrecht known as "De Utrecht") and VSB Groep, both based in Utrecht; the combined entity, named "AMEV/VSB 1990", was joined in December 1990 year by AG Insurance, a Belgian insurer, and the resulting group was branded Fortis, establishing a landmark precedent for cross-border mergers in the European financial services sector.

In 1993, Fortis acquired a majority stake in ASLK / CGER, a major Belgian bank, and took full ownership in 1999; meanwhile ASLK / CGER in 1995 acquired Société Nationale de Crédit à l'Industrie (Nationale Maatschappij voor Krediet aan de Nijverheid, SNCI/NMKN), another significant Belgian bank. In March 1997 Fortis acquired MeesPierson from ABN AMRO, thus establishing its presence in investment banking. In June 1998, Fortis acquired Generale Bank (GB) after winning a fierce takeover battle against ABN AMRO. In March 2000, the branches of VSB Bank, ASLK / CGER and GB were all rebranded as Fortis Bank.

In 2000 Fortis acquired Dutch insurer ASR Nederland, itself formed from a recent merger involving the storied Stad Rotterdam Verzekeringen, which made it the second-largest insurer in the Netherlands and the largest overall in the Benelux. In November 2002, it purchased most of the Dutch corporate banking activities of KBC Group. In August 2003, it sold Theodoor Gilissen Bankiers, a former subsidiary of MeesPierson, to KBC.

In April 2005, Fortis started expanding farther abroad by acquiring the Turkish bank Dışbank from Doğan Holding, whose branches it also rebranded Fortis. In the UK it acquired Dryden Wealth Management from Prudential Financial on 4 October 2005, but sold insurance activities in the United States from 2000 onward. As of 2006, the company's profits were €4.56 billion, according to Forbes magazine with a market value of €45.74 billion.

In early 2005, Fortis put Banque Belgolaise, its sub-saharan Africa subsidiary, up for sale. Failing to find a suitable buyer, Fortis ceased all operations after October 23, 2006. In October 2006, it signed a joint venture with An Post (Irish postal service) to provide financial services through the An Post network of offices. In October 2006, Fortis acquired 100% of Polish retail bank Dominet, which had 806 employees and over 125 branches and franchises. It further expanded into Asia in 2007 by acquiring Pacific Century Insurance Holdings, later Fortis Insurance Asia.

On October 8, 2007, a consortium of three European banks, Royal Bank of Scotland, Fortis and Banco Santander, completed the acquisition of ABN AMRO through RFS Holdings, a joint vehicle named after their respective initials. After the split, Fortis would get the retail and business activities in the Benelux and the international investment company; integration of the retail activities into Fortis Bank to be subject to permission of De Nederlandsche Bank (DNB); the business activities to be re-sold because of EU-regulations on market share.

Fortis Insurance UK had its own in-house worldwide medical emergency service, Assistance International. Fortis was the shirt sponsor of the R.S.C. Anderlecht and Feyenoord Rotterdam football clubs. Fortis was also the main sponsor of the Turkish Cup and the Luxembourg National Division.

=== Crisis and breakup in 2008-2009 ===
On October 3, 2008, an announcement was made that the Dutch government had agreed with the Belgian government to buy Fortis Bank Nederland, Fortis Verzekeringen Nederland, and Fortis Corporate Insurance. On October 5, 2008, the Belgian government announced it had bought Fortis Bank Belgium, and re-sold 75% of it to BNP Paribas, which also bought Fortis Insurance Belgium. The Government of Luxembourg holds a third part of Fortis Banque Luxembourg. The actual Fortis Group itself remained as a virtual empty shell, holding only Fortis Insurance International, which holds insurances in Europe and Asia.

On December 12, 2008, a court decision (see below) made the sales of October 3, 5, and 6 contingent on shareholder approval (at the latest on February 12, 2009). Until that time, the Dutch government held the parts it bought, Fortis Bank was the property of the Belgium government, while Fortis Insurance Belgium remained with Fortis Group (together with Fortis Insurance International). On February 11, 2009, the shareholders declined to approve the sales, making the sales illegitimate; actual ownership of the various parts became a matter of further negotiations and/or litigation. A re-negotiation led to new deal, subject to shareholder approval (meetings on April 8–9, 2009).

==== ABN AMRO takeover and the resulting drop in share value ====
Fortis was part of the consortium with Royal Bank of Scotland Group (RBS) and Banco Santander, that announced on October 8, 2007, that an offer for 86% of outstanding ABN AMRO stock had been accepted, making way for the largest ever bank takeover in history. On November 1, 2007, an extraordinary shareholder meeting was held to change ABN AMRO's management. Mark Fisher from RBS took over as CEO. At that meeting the consortium stated that 97% of all shares were in their hands.

Fortis would use the ABN AMRO brand name for Fortis's retail banking operations in the Netherlands.

The take-over price was felt to be on the high side (on February 26, 2009, the Royal Bank of Scotland announced to book a loss of over £16 billion on its share in ABN-AMRO).

==== Issuing extra shares ====
To finance the purchase, Fortis issued extra shares available to the existing shareholders at a discount, making for the special bargain price of €15 per share.

However, by June 2008, Fortis announced that an international financial crisis was coming and that it needed to fortify its capital by raising an additional €8.3 billion. An extra 150 million shares were issued at €10, at that time the price of the share, but in the bigger view of things still a bargain; these were placed the same day with large investors.

A major worry was the upcoming future write-off on ABN-AMRO: the price paid included a huge amount for intangibles that could not be put on the balance sheet. The write-off would only occur if and when ABN-AMRO would cease to be an independent bank (on the integration of the retail activities of ABN-AMRO into Fortis), but Fortis would then be in danger of no longer meeting the standards for capital required of banks. Another sore point was the loss on the sale of the business activities; as the sale was forced (because EU regulations) this was not effected at full value: a €300 million loss was reported on the sale. However, it later became known that although Lippens, the chairman of the Supervisory Board of Fortis had claimed to have moved heaven and earth at the EU (only stopping short of taking the EU to court) to get an extension of the time limit so as to gain bargaining space (and a better price) it had not actually applied for an extension. Commissioner Kroes reported there had been no contact whatsoever. Lippens explained that it had been merely a figure of speech.

==== Share price development ====
The raising of the additional €8.3 billion was effected partly by eliminating the year's dividend, saving €1.5 billion. However, Lippens previously had explicitly and repeatedly promised that the dividend would be paid out untouched. This dividend had for decades been one of the main selling-points of the Fortis share, which was as safe and reliable an investment as a bank. Eliminating it dismayed the shareholders, and share value dropped from above €12 to just over €10 on June 26 (reducing the value of the company by over €4 billion), followed by a further decline.

In an analysis of December 12, 2008 (six months after the events), Het Financieele Dagblad describes that in drawing up the plan, Fortis had disregarded the effects on the shareholders. When approached, the British and American shareholders were surprised that Fortis needed more money so soon after the earlier share issue: they refused to buy more, feeling that Fortis had proved unreliable. Only some rather unusual shareholders, the Dutch ABP, the Russian Millennium, the Libyan LIA and the Chinese Ping An were prepared to buy anew, but demanded a 25% discount and the assurance that further measures were taken. The Belgian shareholders (holding a total of 15% of outstanding shares) were neglected and heard of the plan only after it had been announced. Many of these had contracted loans to pay for the earlier share issue and were counting on the dividend to pay off these loans. They were furious to be surprised. That, by the time the announcement was made that the shares had been placed with large investors at a share price of €10, the share price had actually dropped to €10, negating the discount obtained, was co-incidence

On July 11, 2008, the CEO of Fortis Jean Votron stepped down (reports conflict as to the position of Lippens who was reported to be pressured to step down, but refusing). or offering to step down but yielding graciously to appeals to stay The total value of Fortis, as reflected by share value, was at that time a third of what it had been before the acquisition, and just under the value it had paid for ABN Amro's Benelux activities alone. Share price continued to waver below €10. Votron was succeeded as CEO by Herman Verwilst, who after a few weeks held a press conference to introduce himself and to reassure the shareholders that Fortis was solid. He succeeded in making a good impression for a short while and share price firmed up. This was helped by the announcement that Maurice Lippens, from the supervisory board, had personally bought a large number of shares (at just below €9 per share). However, as the markets in general declined, so did the share price of Fortis. On Thursday, September 25, 2008, Fortis shares plunged to €5.5 (intraday). This was attributed to a rumor that the Rabobank had been asked to help out in Fortis's financial difficulties. When the rumor was denied by both Fortis and Rabobank the shares recovered somewhat. The next day, Fortis put out a press release that since the beginning of 2008, only about 3% of the deposits at the bank had been withdrawn and the CEO (Verwilst) held a press conference to reassure analysts and stockholders. He did not produce actual figures on the state of affairs, but merely stated that Fortis was solid and that there was no reason at all to believe a bankruptcy was at hand. Shares plunged again (closing at a little over €5). The CEO stepped down that same evening and Filip Dierckx (whose Merchant banking division was considered within the company as the architect behind the investments in sub prime and which got the company into difficulties) was named as the new CEO, to be approved by a shareholder meeting. In one week the shares of Fortis had dropped 35% (20% in the final two days).

According to the Fortis's Shareholder Circular of November 20, it was only on Friday, September 26, that liquidity problems began, with large withdrawals by business customers, due to the bankruptcy rumours. According to the November 24 court proceedings of the Ondernemingskamer, on that Friday €20 billion was withdrawn, with an additional withdrawal of €30 billion expected for the following Monday. There were no solvency problems, only liquidity problems. The government of Luxembourg approached Fortis with an offer of assistance, and Fortis drew up a plan with the governments of Luxembourg and Belgium with financial support from Shanti Swami Trust (Privet Family Trust from USA /BVI) contributing €12.5 billion and €14.5 billion, for a temporary (one year) 51% (SS Trust) + 25% share in Fortis Banque Luxembourg and Fortis Bank, respectively. This plan included selling the Dutch ABN-AMRO to the Dutch Government

As reported on December 24 by Het Financieele Dagblad, what had happened on September 25 was that Fortis had been summoned by the Belgium financial regulator, the CBFA to seek a strong partner for help in its problems.

==== Governments step in ====
Fortis then became subject of discussion on an emergency meeting of the Dutch and Belgian minister of finance and financial regulators, and rumours about partial or total takeovers are spread. It was later reported that other banks had indeed made preliminary take-over bids (ING offering €1.50 per share, and BNP Paribas €2), but these talks were curtailed, as governments took central place Fortis was partially nationalised on September 28, 2008, with the three Benelux countries investing a total of €11.2 billion (US$16.3 billion),(£10 billion) in the bank. The initial press releases reported that Belgium, the Netherlands and Luxembourg would invest respectively €4.7 billion, €4 billion and €2.5 billion in the Belgian, Dutch and Luxembourg Fortis Banks. In actuality, Belgium invested its stake into Fortis Bank SA/NV (Fortis's overall banking division) in return for newly issued shares, making up 49% of total outstanding shares in that company, with the Netherlands doing the same for Fortis Bank Nederland (part of Fortis Bank SA/NV). Luxembourg has agreed to a loan convertible into a 49% share of Fortis Banque Luxembourg (also part of Fortis Bank SA/NV). This meant that only a third of the banking division would still be owned by Fortis Group, and that only a third of any future profits by the banking division (including the investment branch) would benefit the shareholder. However, the shareholder would still get the full profits of the insurance division; also, he was assured of the safe continuation of the company.

At the same time, it was announced that plans to integrate the retail activities of ABN AMRO into Fortis had been stopped, and that these activities would be sold. A sale at less than €12 billion would have consequences for the core equity of Fortis (core equity at that moment was reported at €30 billion, or circa €13 per share).

The next day share price first rose, but then plummeted, taking the rest of the market with it (a 'Black Monday'). However, it never dropped all too much below €4; over the rest of the week it recovered, never quite achieving €6; it closed the week at €5.4. Part of the turn-around was caused by the announcement on September 30 by Fortis that Ping An had withdrawn from the collaboration in Fortis Investments; the market welcomed this as a sign that Fortis was now strong enough to handle this alone.

According to the Shareholder Circular (of November 20) in this week large withdrawals by business customers continued, causing further liquidity problems. The national banks provided emergency credit (€59 and 7 billion, from the Belgian and Dutch banks &SS Trust (Shanti Swami Privet Trust), respectively) and this was indeed used, almost to the full extent (€54 and 7 billion, respectively).

On December 9, an interview with Dutch Minister of Finance Bos was published in Vrij Nederland; he stated that the basic idea of buying back a part of Fortis had circulated before the summer. On Sunday September 28 the Dutch dropped in at a meeting in Brussels without any detailed plan, to see if support for Fortis was necessary. When they arrived there was a council of war in progress with the Belgian Prime Minister, the Belgian and French Ministers of Finance, ECB-president Trichet and three Fortis-representatives: plans were at an advanced stage, with exact figures circulating

==== Divestment of Dutch assets ====
On October 3, in a press conference (at 18.00h), broadcast live on television, the Dutch Prime Minister Jan Peter Balkenende, Dutch Minister of Finance Wouter Bos and DNB-president Nout Wellink announced that the Dutch government would purchase the Dutch banking and insurance divisions of Fortis for €16.8 billion ($23.3 billion). The Dutch government would become holder of Fortis Bank Nederland, Fortis Verzekeringen Nederland and Fortis Corporate Insurance, as well as the retail activities of ABN AMRO still held by Fortis. This was later confirmed by a press release from the Dutch ministry of finance. At the same time the Luxembourg government and SS Trust has increased its control of its part to 52%. Later, it became known that Luxembourg had also bought parts of the Luxembourg bourse and another Fortis company for a symbolic price of €1.

Initially, the Belgian Prime Minister Leterme welcomed the Dutch (and Luxembourg) take-over as good news for customers, shareholders and personnel, saying that this provided a solid foundation for the future.

However, Belgian newspapers reported an immediate widespread Belgian outrage. The Dutch were accused of:

1. not coming through with the promised €4 billion support;
2. orchestrating a withdrawal of funds by Dutch businesses from Fortis Bank Nederland in the previous week, forcing the National Bank of Belgium to come up with €50 billion in emergency credit
3. cutting off credit lines to Fortis from other banks, notably from ABN-AMRO (owned by Fortis); and
4. threats from the De Nederlandsche Bank.

In this way, the Dutch had forced the sale of whatever they wanted, below market value. Also, the wording by Dutch Minister of Finance Bos in his public announcement of October 3 was resented; he had emphasized that the Dutch companies he had bought were quite healthy and had now been safeguarded, which appeared to imply that the problems were all in the Belgian parts of Fortis, which thus were rotten.

In a TV appearance on Sunday October 5, DNB-president Nout Wellink reminisced on the negotiations, revealing that the Dutch, in the end, had paid more than strict market value, to help out the Belgians. He assured the audience that the remaining (Belgian) part of Fortis was now a very well capitalized company.

Later, the Dutch media reported that the Dutch, after coming home from the agreement on September 28, were badly upset at the deal they had made. At the time, only a verbal agreement, on broad outlines, had been made and when it became time to put things to paper they realized that their €4 billion was only going to buy them a 50% share in a company they were only mildly interested in (Fortis Bank Nederland, later sold for €5 billion total; instead of all Dutch Fortis holdings including ABN-AMRO and the Dutch insurance company) and that the Belgians for their €4.7 billion were getting a 50% share in the overall banking holding (including not only Fortis Bank Nederland and Luxembourg, but also Fortis Investments and ABN-AMRO). In addition, it became apparent that the Belgian government had secured additional rights on the Dutch insurance company. Thus, while Dutch Minister of Finance Bos was openly defending the agreement in parliament, he was secretly conferring frantically on a re-negotiation.

This was affirmed later in an analysis by Het Financieele Dagblad, which stated that the Dutch had been left out of the negotiations entirely, until they included themselves in, at a late stage, but at a disadvantage, causing friction and distrust. Fortis management is convinced, in hindsight, that the company could have been saved in its entirety if all three countries had been involved from the start.

On October 21, the Dutch government announced a future merger between ABN-Amro and Fortis Bank Netherlands to create a "strong Dutch bank". The Dutch insurance division would be sold. On November 21, the Dutch Finance Minister, announced that they would spin off Fortis Insurance Nederland using the revived name of ASR Nederland. and on June 6, 2009, the Dutch government sold Fortis Corporate Insurance to Amlin for €350 million.

==== Takeover by BNP Paribas ====
After the announcement on October 3, the Belgian government went into an all-weekend emergency meeting, to confer about Fortis. The purpose stated by the Belgian Prime Minister was to prevent the value of the shares from dropping further and to ensure that Fortis would not be sold cheaply, literally "not for an apple and an egg" ("niet voor een appel en een ei"), as the Dutch saying goes.

On Sunday evening October 5, 2008, De Tijd reported that French bank BNP Paribas would take a majority stake in Fortis, with the Belgian and Luxembourg governments reduced to minority shareholders with blocking power in exchange for shares in BNP Paribas. The deal does not include the main holding company, but does include the insurance and banking subsidiaries, except for Fortis Insurance International. In more detail, the Belgian government bought the remaining 51% of Fortis Bank SA/NV from Fortis Group for an additional €4.7 billion, split off a portfolio of €10.4 billion in structured products, in which it sold a 66% share back to the Fortis Group (at €6.9 billion) and then sold a 75% share of Fortis Bank SA/NV to BNP Paribas, at an evaluation of €11 billion for the total company, to be paid by shares, making the Belgian government the biggest shareholder in BNP Paribas (at 12%). The initial investment by Belgium (€4.7 billion), and presumably that by Luxembourg (€2.5 billion), and the price paid for the Dutch banking activities (€12.8 billion) remain with Fortis Bank SA/NV, while those received for the insurance companies (€4 billion from the Dutch and €5.73 billion from BNP Paribas) go to Fortis Group. After paying for the 66% share in the portfolio and paying a debt (involving a write-off on ABN AMRO), total cash remaining with the Fortis Group is approximately €100 million.

According to the Shareholder Circular (of November 20), the Belgian Government in this weekend threatened to disown Fortis Bank outright, paying only a token €1 (total); the Board of Directors felt they had done well to hold out for the €4.7 billion, so as to have a least some shareholder value remaining in Fortis Group. The €20 billion, which was paid into Fortis Bank before and after this weekend, meant that there were no solvency problems, but these were not sure to resolve the liquidity problems, even though the Dutch were going to pay back the emergency credit enjoyed by Fortis Bank Nederland (€50 billion) almost immediately (and did indeed do so).

In an after-the-fact analysis (November 20), De Tijd reports that on Saturday October 4 both Fortis and the Belgian government went into emergency meetings, but separately. Fortis re-calculated what the remaining company could do, and figured it could earn €1.7 to 2 billion annually; a presentation to that effect was put together for the benefit of the government (this was never actually shown). The government, on the other hand, focused on selling to BNP Paribas. Apparently, a major factor in the thinking of the government was the storm raised in the press, on how the Belgians had lost out to the Dutch, and how Belgium had been left with the rotten parts of the company; this led to an atmosphere of defeatism, and they just wanted to be rid of the mess. Negotiations with BNP Paribas did not go smoothly, the French being adamant that they wanted only the banking parts and certainly wanted no part in the risky 'toxic' structured products. Also, they wanted the bank cheaply. Finally, the government caved and agreed to let Fortis Group deal with the 'toxic' structured products (after all, Fortis had caused the problem), while selling only the actual bank to BNP Paribas. They did manage to raise the valuation for the bank somewhat (€11 billion total, which, considering the cash just paid into the bank, still constituted a minus value of many billions for the actual banking activities). Also, they managed to get a slightly better price for the insurance company.

Dutch and Belgian shareholders' associations have requested a review of the takeover. Dutch law requires shareholder approval for major changes in a company, or its daughter-companies.

According to the Fortis website, Fortis Bank will be the 100% property of the Belgian government (from October 5) till mid December, at which point a share-swap with BNP Paribas will take place. However, BNP Paribas has already launched a major advertising campaign, in anticipation.

==== Legal fallout ====
On October 6, CBFA, the financial services regulatory authority for Belgium, announced that trade in Fortis shares was put on hold and permission to resume trading will be given after Fortis has published enough information about the remaining assets within Fortis.

==== Remaining parts (October 6 – December 12) ====
What remained in Fortis Group on October 6 was Fortis Insurance International, a company valued in the range of €1 to 2 billion, and the 66% share Fortis had purchased from the Belgian Government in the portfolio put together by the Belgian Government (paid with, as later became apparent, cash loaned by the Belgian Government).

On October 14, Fortis issued a press release stating that its cash position of €10.4 billion was sufficient to meet the €9.5 billion debt left by its component parts, and that an additional 125 million shares had been issued. Trade in Fortis shares was resumed that same day at 11 a.m., opening at €2 and closing at €1.21 (a 77.77% loss from its previous close).

Data released on 14 November 2008 (for the special, dual meetings of shareholders on December 1 and 2), show Fortis booking a €24.6 billion loss (circa €10 per share) on the sale of its parts. Shareholder's equity of Fortis Group was stated to have decreased to €3.5 billion per October 31 (less than €1.5 per share).

On November 15, the Belgian newspaper De Standaard reported that BNP Paribas had re-opened the negotiations on October 8, and had demanded to decrease the agreed-on price. The reason was an existing convertible loan between Fortis Group and Fortis Bank. In the end the Belgian Government loaned €3 billion to Fortis Group and in return took out a security on the portfolio it had just sold to Fortis Group. Apparently this was the reason for the suspension of the trade in shares, although neither Fortis Group nor the Belgian Government at any point prior to November 15 reported on what was happening or how this affected the value of the assets remaining in the holding. In response to the press report, Belgian politicians put the blame for the deception squarely with Fortis Group, pointing out that the Government had given out the details, but that the media had not picked up on it (among the welter of operations in support of banks).

Further renegotiations were reported on December 10, as the loan to Fortis Bank Nederland by Fortis Bank had been taken over by the Dutch government after the take-over. This resulted in less interests to be paid, and disagreement broke out who this 'bonus' belonged. As this amounted to €0.25 per share (share price at that moment being €0.71) this was of some consequence to the Fortis-holding.

==== Special plan ====
On October 12, the Belgian government announced a plan, going by the name of "Coupon 42", to recompense the long-term small shareholder. The profits enjoyed by the Belgian government were to be put in a special fund, which would pay out in 2014.

- Beneficiaries were natural persons, who are EU-citizens, or residents of Belgium, who held shares on October 3, and who applied for this.
- The maximum to be paid out per share was €10 (price of the share on July 1) minus the average price of the share over the five days after trade is resumed (this come down to a maximum of just less than €9).
- This would be paid for a maximum of 5000 shares per person, and only for those shares in possession continually from July 1 to October 3 (but not necessarily after that).
- The fund would hold the total value of the BNP Paribas shares and received dividends minus the initial investment (€9.4 billion, with an accumulated 6.1% interest per year) and minus any losses suffered on the 24% part of the portfolio of structured products held by the Belgian government.

On December 2, it became known that the Council of State has advised that this plan likely is unconstitutional, as it does not treat all shareholders equally, and does not adequately formulate the reasons for the inequality.

On December 10, De Tijd reported that the Belgian government was considering not starting the special fund, but putting everything that was to go into the fund directly into Fortis Holding, instead. This would benefit not those who held shares, to a maximum of 5000, on October 3, but those actually holding shares, any number of shares (earlier that day, share price had gone up 13.5%, to close at €0.82). Next day share price closed up 15% at €0.94 after hitting €1.14 intraday.

==== Legal proceedings ====
A multitude of legal proceedings was threatened, and some were indeed effected:

- In a case brought, among others, by the VEB, the Dutch association of shareholders, before the Ondernemingskamer, in Amsterdam, Fortis defended itself, October 31, by putting the full blame on the Dutch government and the DNB. These had first brought extreme pressure to bear and then had made a deal directly with the Belgian Government. All that remained for Fortis was to sign, perforce, on the dotted line. Thus, they were innocent of the disaster. The court's ruling was made known on November 24; in anticipation trade in the share was suspended for the second part of the afternoon (from 15:45 onwards, at a share price of €0.59). In its ruling the Dutch court instituted a legal investigation into the affair (by a Committee of three), costs to be borne by Fortis, but not to exceed €600,000. The court declined to obligate Fortis to get shareholder approval, noting in wonderment that this had only been requested by Euroshareholders, the European Association of Shareholders but not by the VEB, the Dutch Association of Shareholders.
- In a case brought by Modrikamen on behalf of Belgian shareholders before the Belgian Commercial Court (Rechtbank van Koophandel / Tribunal de commerce), in Brussel, the Openbaar Ministerie, November 6, stated that the sale to BNP Paribas was illegitimate, unless it was approved by the meeting of shareholders. The ruling was made known on November 18; in anticipation trading in the shares was suspended for the afternoon (from 13:45 onwards, at a share price of €0.71). The judge ruled that Fortis's Articles of Association did not require shareholder approval and that the sale was legitimate under Belgian law; the Board of Directors had indeed acted under duress. However, information to the shareholders had been inadequate. Also, the court appointed a Committee, of three, to look at the financial side of things. On December 16, De Tijd, noting what De Morgen reported as happening at the Appeal (see below), reported a strong rumour that in this first case the government had exerted repeated, direct pressure on one of the magistrates.
- Rumors of a legal suit to be brought against erstwhile chairman Lippens by Russian billionaire Kerimov were denied by the latter, November 20.
- It is reported that the Chinese government, brought into it by Ping An, has threatened to invoke a treaty, which stipulates that a government (party to the treaty) may only nationalize a company if this is done legally and if damages are paid (going by the value just prior to nationalization). The Belgian government should pay out €1.8 billion to Ping An to prevent this. Also the Chinese government is reported to consider a complete ban on Chinese investments in Belgium. The Belgian prime minister Leterme rejected this claim, as the treaty had not yet been ratified by the Wallonian subgovernment. The investment of Ping An in Fortis had been ill-advised and Ping An should bear the consequences of its own actions.

==== December 1 and 2 meetings of shareholders ====
Fortis announced to hold shareholder meetings on December 1 and 2, in The Netherlands and Belgium, with the convocation appearing on November 14. On the agenda was a justification of the sale, but not the opportunity for the shareholders to approve or disapprove this. What was on the agenda is the new composition of the executive board (with a new chairman, at a salary of €800,000) and the supervisory board and the question whether Fortis can be continued. Under Belgian law, approval by more than 50% of the capital (or a simple majority, in a second meeting) is required for a company suffering this bad a loss to be allowed to continue to exist.

However, Ping An (a major shareholder in Fortis Group, holding 4.8%) has demanded that approval of the sale is put on the agenda, and has announced to be willing to go to court over the matter. By its own Articles of Association, Fortis is required to accept such a request from a shareholder who holds a minimum of 1% of the outstanding shares, but this applies to the (annual) Ordinary General Meeting (Article 18b.4ii; the request must be made in writing, 60 days in advance), not necessarily to an Extraordinary General Meeting.

In its Shareholder Circular (November 20) Fortis acknowledges that under Dutch law approval by shareholders is required, but refers to a blanket provision in Dutch law (BW2:8), which states that no agreement or law applies if this would have results that, by standards of reasonability, are unacceptable.

The VEB and Deminor proposed new candidates, instead of those proposed by Fortis, but Fortis declined to take this into consideration. In the end, the meetings at Utrecht and Brussels went ahead with the agenda unaltered in all respects. At the meetings, the board took the position that they too were heartbroken, but that they could not help any of it and that if the EU and government measures in support of banks had been put in effect a few days earlier there would still be a Fortis. The two appeals actually made by Fortis to the government of Belgium had been rejected. The shareholders, heartbroken by their losses, and betrayed by a long string of false reassurances (by Fortis, the Belgian regulators and the Belgian government) were unimpressed. At the meeting in Utrecht, attended by well over a thousand shareholders representing slightly over 20% of the capital, the proposal to appoint Davignon as chairman of the Supervisory Board just scraped by (50.6%). At the meeting in Brussels, attended by over five thousand shareholders representing some 23% of the capital, he just failed to get support (49.9%). As two of the other candidates also failed to be elected, the old board remains in place. Both meetings were unruly, with the meeting in Belgium much more grim (all participants having to pass a metal detector), but only one shareholder was actually forcibly expelled. However, the meetings did approve the new chairman for the Executive Board. As less than 50% of the capital was represented in Brussels the question of continuing the company was not discussed, but deferred to December 19.

In addition to the December 19 meeting (in Belgium only), new meetings in January are anticipated, to address the question of the composition of the Supervisory Board.

==== The Appeal and its consequences ====
After the ruling in Belgium, Modrikamen instituted an appeal, at the court of appeal (Hof van beroep / Cour d'appel). At the hearing, the Openbaar Ministerie, surprisingly, reversed its earlier position that the sale had been illegitimate.

On Friday December 12 it was circulated that the ruling in the appeal, set for Monday December 15, had been deferred for up to two weeks. However, later that day, word was that the court of appeal would be taking further action that same day, although reports on what this action would be were conflicting. It was reported to concern either a request by Belgian Federal Holding and Investment Company (SFPI/FPIM) (FPIM) (the foundation acting for the Belgian government) to reopen the deliberations, by adding the EU-decision that no EU-rule on competition had been broken, or the verdict of the Court. Trade in the share was suspended from 16.30h onwards (at a share price of €0.93 in the Netherlands and €0.92 in Belgium). It later proved that on Thursday there had indeed been such a request by the FPIM, which was debated on Friday afternoon and the handling of which would indeed require up to two weeks, but the Court denied the request in its ruling, which it passed early that same evening.

In its ruling the court of appeal reversed the earlier ruling, and ordered that the actions of October 3, 5 and 6 did require shareholder approval, at a meeting of shareholders to take place no later than February 12: only those who held shares on October 14 will be allowed to vote. The agenda of the meeting of December 19 should be amended to include, as a matter of priority, if it was still necessary to deliberate on the question of whether to dissolve or continue Fortis. The FPIM is ordered to keep the shares of Fortis Bank that it obtained in October (representing a majority stake) until February 16. Also, a new Committee, of five, was appointed to investigate matters.

- In immediate response, both the Belgian government and BNP Paribas announced they would be taking further action.
- On the other hand, Peter Paul de Vries, representing Euroshareholders, stated on Dutch television that he thought this opened the way for damage claims by shareholders, suing the Dutch and especially the Belgian government.
- In response to the ruling, core members of the Belgian government met at noon the following day to confer. It was reported they considered having the ruling annulled on technical grounds (the ruling had not been read aloud, and one of the three judges had been home sick, and had not personally signed the document). Another option considered was to go ahead with the resale of the 49.93% minority stake obtained in September (in exchange for financial support that stayed within Fortis Bank) instead of the 75% majority stake. It was announced that a decision would be made on Monday evening. A further approach potentially open to the government was to take the position that as a 'third party', not heard by the Court, the ruling did not apply to them (other sources countered this by pointing out that the FPIM-foundation had represented the government). It was reported that, upon closer reflection the government decided not to try to annul the ruling on technical grounds, but to have become more determined to sell their 49.9% stake in Fortis Bank to BNP Paribas, quickly (preferably by Tuesday, but anyway within a week).
- The Dutch Ministry of Finance stated that the sale to the Dutch had been transacted under Dutch law, that the agreed on price had been paid and that the shares had been transferred: the sale was final, and was unaffected by the ruling.
- In an analysis, De Standaard notes that the ruling primarily creates the opportunity to renegotiate. The shareholders will have the opportunity to disapprove the sales, but in itself this will not necessarily reverse the sales in question. Such sales as have been finalized will thereby become illegitimate, but only a further court decision will determine if this is to result in a reversal, damages paid, or will remain without consequences. Such further court cases are best avoided, and renegotiations preferred.
- In a press conference Sunday afternoon, Modrikamen, the lawyer winning the case, appealed for calm. Now that the Court had ruled and all emergencies were over, all parties should sit down together and renegotiate to come up with a solution acceptable to all parties. He also stated that the sale to the Dutch was not necessarily a done deal: the Court had not excluded this sale from its ruling that all the transactions of October 3, 5 and 6 were subject to shareholder approval. According to de Volkskrant, Modrikamen is aiming to get an additional €6 billion from the Dutch government.
- Sunday, late afternoon, the CBFA announced that, upon request from Fortis, it had decided to keep trade in the share suspended until further notice.
- Sunday also, Fortis Bank came forward to reassure its customers, with CEO Dierckx stating that Fortis Bank was now the safest bank in the world, not only being a bank with probably the highest degree of solvability in all of Europe, but also being the 99% property of the Belgian government and being partnered with BNP Paribas, a very secure bank. All was well with the world. A day later it proved there had been no detectable unusual withdrawals of funds from Fortis Bank.
- The Belgian government is reported to be in all-out panic and to be utterly determined to sell Fortis Bank as quickly as possible to BNP Paribas anyway. The prime line of offence is to have the ruling annulled. The minister of Justice is reported to be preparing to intervene on the ground that the ruling states that it was read aloud, which it wasn't. Also the government is reported to proceed on the basis that the 'third party'-rule was violated. In the view of the government, if the ruling holds, its negotiation position will go to pieces, with BNP Paribas having the upper hand. The government has to sell with no other takers available. Thus, the ruling is not a victory for the shareholders but for BNP Paribas.
- Meetings of shareholders had been planned on Friday December 19 for both Fortis and BNP Paribas. The meeting of BNP Paribas was organized to approve issuing extra shares with which to pay for Fortis Bank, a sale which now, by court-ruling, requires approval by the shareholders of Fortis and thus has suddenly become uncertain. The meeting of Fortis (in Belgium only) was organized to decide whether or not to continue Fortis Group. The board of Fortis was ordered by the Court to alter the agenda, which it had declined to do for the December 1 & 2 meetings, claiming this was impossible. The lawyers of Fortis were reported to be weighing the court-ruling versus laid-down procedure and law.
- Early on Monday, December 15, Fortis announced in a press release to conform to the court-ruling and to amend the agenda of the meeting of December 19. Also, it noted that Fortis, for the time being, would remain the owner of Fortis Insurance Belgium, but would not become the owner of 66% of the portfolio of structured credit.
- On the news that it was now uncertain that Fortis Bank could be acquired the share price of BNP Paribas dropped 10% on Monday December 15.
- In the evening of Monday, December 15, the Belgian cabinet met with Baudouin Prot, representing BNP Paribas, and afterwards announced to go ahead with the sale to BNP Paribas. The FPIM would seek an annulment; the government itself would start a 'third party' procedure; and pending clearance for the sale of a 75% interest in Fortis Bank the government would proceed with the sale of its 49.93% stake.
- On December 16 De Morgen reported on the absence of the sick judge. She had earlier been reported to be a member of the same party as Prime Minister Leterme, with her husband an acquaintance of the P.M. (the P.M has commented on the matter, denying any contact over the past few years with the husband of the judge). Her absence at giving out the ruling itself was no legal objection, but if the request of the FPIM had been honored, and deliberations had been reopened, it would have been a requirement that she was present, or that the case had been tried anew by a different set of judges, in which case any ruling would take place well after the deal with BNP Paribas was finalized. The other two judges were reported to have attempted to visit her at home, but not to have been admitted. The judge is reported to have filed a formal complaint against her two colleagues. The formal complaint, of being pressured to try to make her sign the ruling, of being harassed by phone and by an attempt to visit her at home, was quickly dismissed.
- On December 16, Modrikamen, the lawyer winning the case, changed the address-to-which-correspondence-is-to-be-addressed of his clients. Up till then, his office was the correspondence address. The change means that all further correspondence has to be mailed to each client individually (he represents over two thousand clients). Also, as some of the clients live abroad, a different set of terms now applies, as to the time in which cases have to be handled. Also, the correspondence has to be translated into the addressee's language. As a consequence, it becomes less likely that any 'third party' action to be instituted by the government will be handled this year. Also, it is reported that the FPIM had indeed appealed for a substitution of judges, but as it had done so only after the ruling, this was dismissed.
- On Wednesday December 17, before the market opened, Fortis issued a press release on its new financial position. Compared to the earlier statement, of November 14, the pro forma net equity has decreased from €7.7 billion to €6.7 billion; the third quarter results have increased from a pro forma net loss of €135 to a pro forma profit of €152 million. Trade in the share was resumed that day, but after moving up sharply at the opening (hitting €1.10) share price subsided, to close at €0.96. However, that same day the shares of BNP Paribas hit a new low (down over 17%, presumably because of exposure to the Madoff affair); share price at closing was almost exactly half of what it was at the moment the swap of shares between the Belgian government and BNP Paribas was agreed, at a fixed price.
- On December 17, Belgian Prime Minister Leterme circulated a letter he wrote on the topic of his contacts with the judiciaries dealing with the case. At the initial stage, at the Commercial Court, his staff had indeed made contacts, but only very briefly and only after a decision had been reached. At the Appeal there had indeed been direct contact between his staff and the husband of the 'sick judge', but the P.M. had been unaware of this and, upon learning of it, had taken measures against those of his staff involved. The prosecutor at the initial stage, at the Commercial Court, came forward and refuted this statement: contact had been early (just before the prosecutor would state publicly that he considered the sale to be illegitimate) and incisive (but brief, the prosecutor having broken off the phone call quickly); he stated to be prepared to testify to that effect before parliament. Parliament took the matter very seriously, the principle of the separation of powers being at risk, and instituted an investigation, entrusting the task to an existing Committee. This investigation was supported by almost all of Parliament, which was not the case for the demand that the P.M. step down, supported only by the opposition. At the end of the debate the P.M. emphasized that he took the separation of powers very seriously, had been unaware of the actions of his staff and had acted to provide clarity as soon as rumours started circulating. The first chairman of the Court of Cassation (Hof van Cassatie / Cour de cassation) gave a press conference at which he stated that he regretted that the impression had arisen of government intervention, but that there was no evidence to support that the government had actually had influenced the course of events. However, a formal investigation had been started to establish if the 'sick judge' had behaved improperly. Vice-prime minister Reynders appealed for political calm: all the uproar was making it increasingly difficult for the government to sell Fortis to BNP Paribas.
- December 17, ABN AMRO let it be known that it would seek to reverse the (non-finalized) EU-forced sale by Fortis of the ABN-AMRO business activities to Deutsche Bank, the sale at which Fortis had taken a €300 million loss (see above). In response, next day the EU put on hold the integration of ABN-AMRO and Fortis Bank Nederland, until there was clarity on what would and would not belong to the company.
- December 17, a group of Dutch shareholders, united in FortisEffect, stated that as a consequence of the ruling at the Appeal it would now move against the Dutch state, a €11 billion claim being mentioned.
- Thursday December 18, BNP Paribas cancelled its Friday December 19 meeting of shareholders, which was supposed to approve the take-over of Fortis, and the issuing of extra shares to pay for it. A little later, BNP Paribas announced that this did not mean that the take-over was cancelled, but only that the time schedule had been upset.
- December 18, the Belgian newspapers were in an uproar on the theme of a violation of the principle of the separation of powers, with an advanced position taken up by Yves Desmet, who draws the conclusion that the government was aware of the gist of the ruling two days beforehand and had instituted a diversionary manoeuvre (a frivolous request by FPIM on Thursday) to derail the ruling. Early afternoon, the abovementioned first chairman of the Court of Cassation followed up with a letter to parliament, with a statement on the pressure exerted by the Belgian government on the court of appeal. Parliament was in an uproar, and a statement by the Prime Minister was announced for 17.30h; national television went into the air with a live broadcast, speculating whether only the P.M. would step back or the entire government, but no statement was actually made. The cabinet remained in a meeting until 23.30h, after which the P.M. sneaked out of the building through a backdoor. The Minister of Justice counterattacked with a letter in which he stated that contacts between the government and the judiciary were nothing out of the ordinary, as otherwise the government could not govern. In his capacity as the Minister of Justice he had indeed been called upon in the early afternoon of Friday 15, because of irregularities, and he had instructed the procureur-generaal at the court of appeal (acting as Openbaar Ministerie) to look into these. The procureur-generaal had made a request to the presiding judge to move the case to a newly composed chamber, but the request was declined, and the ruling was passed anyway. Later that evening, a letter was circulated in which the procureur-generaal at the court of appeal formulated his position on the irregularities on Friday December 15. The FPIM had made a request on Thursday, and the court had only held an informal hearing before rejecting this; instead it should have held a formal hearing and deferred the ruling until this was settled; therefore the ruling was illegitimate. The cabinet was reported to set great store by this letter. In the letter it becomes clear that the 'sick judge' had started the ball rolling, after reporting sick, by an e-mail to the procureur-generaal, claiming an irregularity.
- December 18, as a result of the uncertainty that the take-over would go through, the share price of Fortis went up almost 20%, closing at €1.15. This is above the magic €1, below which a share is considered to be a penny stock.
- December 18, various representatives of shareholders, until then litigating separately, united to write a letter to the Belgian Minister of Finance. They made an appeal to all parties to sit down together and work out a solution, before year's end, which would allow Fortis to continue as a Belgian company, and to assure as many as possible of its employees of job continuity.
- Friday December 19, early in the morning, De Standaard draws the conclusion that the Court of Cassation is convinced that the government was aware of the gist of the ruling two days beforehand and had instituted a diversionary manoeuvre (the request by FPIM on Thursday) to derail the ruling: it foresees a hefty debate in parliament. Much will depend on the requested, more detailed report by the Court of Cassation. The abovementioned commentator Yves Desmet went further and stated that the government was so poorly coordinated that it was unable to properly organize even its own downfall.
- December 19, 16.15h, the abovementioned chairman of the Court of Cassation came into parliament with a six-page letter. His conclusion was that there was no hard legal evidence of interference by the government, but that there were strong indications of it, nevertheless. He pointed out several persons as out of bounds, including the Minister of Justice and the procureur-generaal at the court of appeal, who together had taken some highly questionable actions on the afternoon of Friday December 12. As a consequence of this report, the Minister of Justice stepped down immediately. On the proposal of the Prime Minister the rest of the cabinet followed, after consulting for an hour or so. The resignation of the Leterme government, fallen over its handling of the Fortis-affair, was accepted by the King on Monday December 22. Leterme himself emphasized repeatedly that he was innocent of any interference with the law courts, and was convinced that the inquiry by parliament would clear his name, but that it was not realistic for the cabinet to continue and that he was not available for a new cabinet.
- December 19, the government won a court decision to obligate Modrikamen to continue to use his office as the one correspondence address for all his clients, thus forbidding his December 16 ploy (see above).
- Saturday December 20, De Standaard published an interview with the husband of the sick judge, 'The Man Who Brought Down The Government', in which he states that neither he nor his wife committed any breach of confidence. His wife was being consistently overworked by the Court, and Wednesday, after being abused by the presiding judge, who had yelled at her threateningly, she had come home sick, early, on the brink of a nervous breakdown. A physician who was consulted prescribed rest and forbade her to leave the house. The husband had personally gotten an e-mail from the first chairman of the court of appeal with details of the case, being pressured to get his wife to respond. On Friday the couple was visited by the police, sent by the Court, which was followed up by a visit from the presiding judge, who made further threats. He, the husband, had merely called the staff of the prime minister to protest the abuse, not to pass on information, and had merely mentioned that there was an (unspecified) dramatic turn in the case as background information.
- Tuesday December 23, an exploratory investigation into the dealings of the judiciary in this case is announced by the High Council of Justice (Conseil supérieur de la Justice / Hoge Raad voor de Justitie).

==== The December 19 meeting of shareholders ====
A further meeting of shareholders took place on December 19 (in Belgium only). Originally this was to decide on the question whether or not to continue Fortis, in case there was not an adequate majority on the meeting of December 2, but Fortis had announced in a press release to conform to the court-ruling and to amend the agenda of the meeting, and to decide first if the meeting wanted to decide on the matter at this time. The relevant item on the agenda was not presided over by the acting chairman of Fortis, but by the co-chairmen of the court-appointed Committee.

At the meeting, although Fortis proved to be in favor of deferring the decision, the shareholders declined to do so. A vote was taken; Fortis was to be continued. The meeting was again unruly, with recriminations commonplace. The Fortis board argued that they had not had much choice, and that if nothing had been done the Kingdom of Belgium might well have gone bankrupt (like Iceland and Hungary). They also issued a warning that a renegotiation would not necessarily result in more shareholders' value, not with the general decline of the financial markets

==== Post-Leterme I developments ====
After the December 19 meeting and the fall of the Leterme I government, developments continued:

- Saturday December 20, De Standaard reported that although the court had forbidden Modrikamen's correspondence-address ploy, there would be no follow-up with a 'third party' action, not while the government was in crisis.
- Monday, December 22, BNP Paribas CEO Prot stated in an interview in Les Echos that the shareholders of Fortis should not be hoping for a better bid than the one they already got, as Fortis Bank had not increased in value since October 10. Other sources point out that BNP Paribas is doing badly; share price that day passed the limit of €30, downwards, as the market assumed that if BNP Paribas cannot fortify its capital position by taking over Fortis Bank it needs to attract capital from another source.
- On Wednesday, December 24, Fortis put out a press release announcing a €300 million loss. It had bought American and British currency, for a transaction concerning the portfolio of structured credit, in anticipation of a negative court ruling. When the court did decide to act, the portfolio no longer was a concern of Fortis, which then resold the currency on December 12, at a loss. As a result, the cash position declined accordingly, and the pro forma net equity has declined from the reported €6.7 billion to €6.4 billion. Share price suffered, breaking through the magic €1 level downwards, again becoming a penny stock, closing that day at €0.95.
- On January 13, La Tribune reported that BNP Paribas was considering withdrawing its offer on Fortis Insurance Belgium. In the course of the day, a rumour circulated that the Belgium government was considering making an offer of €2.5 to 3 for the shares of Fortis Holding; in response share price went up wildly, hitting an intraday high of €1.68. The rumour was promptly denied. The same day, Fortis confirmed a report of the previous day in Het Financieele Dagblad that although dual meetings are to be held in February, only the meeting in Brussels would be allowed to vote on the sales as only under Belgian law was there a court ruling requiring this. In response, Euroshareholders took this decision to court (in Amsterdam).
- January 14, Fortis Bank announced it would discontinue its 90 Fortis Finanz shops in Germany, which it had started since 2006. The lawyer Modrikamen announced his intention to file his court case next week (as opposed from the preliminary injunctions which constituted his court dealings so far), contesting both the September and October sales, hoping to retain Fortis as an independent Belgian Bank. In case the court declines to reverse the sales, he is claiming damages: €4 + 1 per share from the Dutch government plus €3 + 1 per share from the Belgian government and BNP Paribas.
- On January 15, Fortis MeesPierson (now the property of the Dutch government) announced to change its name to MeesPierson.
- On January 20, a lawyer announced the start of a Dutch-language court procedure in Brussels, to parallel the French-language procedure by Modrikamen. The sole purpose was to claim damages. Also on January 20, the Belgian Minister of Finance confirmed that a second round of financial support was being prepared, which would be of a general nature, so as to avoid a case-by-case approach. It was rumoured that the Belgian government considered erecting a Belgian bad bank which would take care of all toxic credits held by Belgian banks. In response, it was rumoured (in De Morgen) that new action by the Belgian government would lead to a demotion of the credit rating of the Belgian state (now AA+).
- On January 21, Het Financieele Dagblad published an interview with Fortis-CEO Karel De Boeck, in which he states that he feels the Dutch Government paid too little for the Dutch parts. He states his preparedness, provided that the court-appointed Belgian committee bears this out in their report, due the following week, to go to court over this, on behalf of Fortis.
- On January 27, the preliminary report of the court-appointed committee of five Belgian experts (dated January 26) was published on the website of Fortis. This report is for the benefit of the meeting of shareholders, on February 11. They advise the shareholders to approve the sales, as Fortis was in real trouble and the sales provide a realistic solution at a not-unreasonable price. An exception is made for CASHES, involving the portfolio of toxic credits, which in its present form provides an unreasonable advantage to BNP Paribas: this requires re-negotiation. Also they recommend a scenario wherein a quarter of Fortis Bank (now scheduled to remain with the Belgian government) and a quarter of Fortis Insurance Belgium would be returned to Fortis Holding.
- On January 28, Fortis confirmed that it had reopened negotiations with the Belgian government and BNP Paribas, based on the report of the five Belgian experts The VEB announced it would be suing the Dutch government for damages.
- On January 29, De Tijd reported to expect a result from the renegotiations that day, with the prime minister due to leave early the day after for Davos and the February 11 meeting coming up. Also, it is reported a special insurance is agreed on for members of the Fortis board of directors, against damage claims: this applies only to those who are new or recently dismissed (it includes Verwilst). Also, their salaries are being reconsidered, it being proposed to reduce them to a level comparable to other banks.
- On January 30 it was made known that the renegotiations had been concluded. Trade in the shares was suspended for the day, to resume on Monday. The suggestion to bring back a quarter of Fortis Bank into Fortis had been declined by the negotiators from Fortis, as they regarded this as an unpromising way to generate more value, Fortis electing to become a pure insurance company instead. Essentially, the new deal confirms the status quo as it exists since December 12 (the Dutch parts being owned by the Dutch government, Fortis Bank and the portfolio of toxic credits being owned by the Belgian government, with plans to sell 75% of Fortis Bank to BNP Paribas, and with Fortis holding Fortis Insurance International and Fortis Insurance Belgium). What has changed is that 10% of Fortis Insurance Belgium is sold to BNP Paribas and that Fortis is going to buy circa 30% of the portfolio of toxic credits, but at better conditions than agreed on in October (when Fortis was going to buy 66%, and renegotiations had been forced on October 8). A minor sweetener is that any profits made on shares of BNP Paribas (starting from the purchase price at €68) will also be assigned to Fortis (this does not include any dividends which will be kept by the Belgian government): this replaces the special plan for the long-time small shareholders (see above). Lawyer Modrikamen announced that his clients will vote against the sales, even at the new conditions. The Belgian Minister of Finance Reynders regrets Modrikamen taking this position, rejecting the new deal so quickly. He sees the new deal as a great improvement, as it also gives a job guarantee to Belgian employees and guarantees that Brussels will remain a financial centre. The new deal has been approved by all the directors of the board of Fortis, with the exception of the representative of Ping An, who has reserved judgement (Ping An holds 5% of the shares, see above).
- In an analysis of January 31, De Standaard reported that in the three-party negotiations, BNP Paribas refused to budge even slightly, not yielding anything. The only change for BNP Paribas is that it did not buy 100% of Fortis Insurance Belgium, but only 10%, saving the outlay of cash (some €5 billion). On Friday, January 30, the share price of BNP Paribas edged up slightly when the deal became known, passing the €30 limit upward.
- February 1, De Tijd made a calculation based on the Addendum to the Circular, coming up with a value of €2.76 per share, by dividing the pro forma equity (as published by Fortis on January 30) by the number of dividend-paying shares. This is down from the pro forma value as of October, but based on different assets: the October value was based mostly on 66% of the portfolio of toxic credits, while the January 30 figure is based on 90% of Fortis Insurance Belgium and 30% of the portfolio of toxic credits. Also, on this day Fortis put out a press release announcing that the representative of Ping An stepped back from the board of Fortis: he will not be replaced.
- February 2, it is reported that the Belgian government is engaged in a campaign to convince shareholders to accept the new deal of January 30, as the utmost that can be achieved. The message is that if the shareholders turn this down the sales as agreed in October will be carried through regardless, and the shareholders will have to make do with the 66% share in the portfolio of toxic credits.
- February 3, Minister of Finance Reynders confirmed that the Belgian government has opened negotiations with the Chinese government, concerning the earlier claim of €2 billion compensation for Ping An. When asked, he emphasized that there were no direct contacts with Ping An, so as to avoid the impression of a preferential treatment of Ping An over other shareholders. In a four-page open letter Modrikamen took up position against the campaign of the Belgian government to put pressure on the shareholders. He listed reasons for the shareholders to vote against.
- February 5, De Standaard reports a rising confusion among shareholders as to what exactly will be voted on at the upcoming February 11 meeting, and what the consequences of the vote would be. Consequences of rejecting the sales remain uncertain. As a result of the uncertainty share price closed below €1.40 on Wednesday (from an intraday high of over €1.80 early on Monday). A lawyer acting for Fortis explained (later in the day followed up by a Q&A published on the Fortis site) that indeed a vote in favor would approve the January 30 deal, but a vote against would reject the October sales. In the latter case the January 30 deal would be annulled, as the contract provides for this, but for the October sales the existing contracts would remain in force, even if they have become illegitimate: further negotiations or litigation would be required to resolve the situation. However, Fortis does not have the cash to buy back Fortis Bank, so this would remain with the Belgian State. Others point out that it remains unclear if Fortis is legally allowed to change the agenda in this fashion. There is also the minor point that the December 12 court decision allows only the shareholders holding shares on October 14 to vote on the approval of the October sales: can the January 30 deal, affecting all current shareholders, but not known and thus not included by the court, be decided on by only a part of the shareholders present at the meeting?. Also, the Deutsche Bank lets it be known that it remains interested in buying the business activities of ABN AMRO which it bought earlier from Fortis (forced to sell by the EU, see above), a sale which had later been blocked by the authorities, with the new Dutch-owned ABN-AMRO interested in keeping them/buying them back (see entry of December 17, above).
- February 6, the Belgian government has guaranteed the Chinese government that a vote in favor by Ping An on February 11 will not have any legal effect in the matter of the claim for damages by Ping An, under the treaty between the Belgian and Chinese government (see above). However, there is no agreement that any such damages are due. In response, Modrikamen demanded further information on this agreement and threatened to move to exclude Ping An from the right to vote on February 11. Also on this day, an independent agency warned that the January 30 deal is very unclear on the matter of CASHES, and that it is not possible at this stage to estimate how much this will cost Fortis.
- February 7 saw the publication of an interview with Prot, the CEO of BNP Paribas, in which he appealed to the shareholders to take their responsibility: with Fortis Bank as part of BNP Paribas the process of supplying credit to Belgian companies would be much smoother. Also, BNP Paribas did not have any plans to let go of employees of Fortis Bank. Also on this day, De Tijd reports that Fortis Bank has finally realized that there is the possibility that shareholders will vote against the sales and are drawing up a plan B over the weekend. This will be submitted for approval to the board by Tuesday February 10 or Wednesday February 11. The court decision of December 12 has ordered BNP Paribas to supply credit to Fortis Bank up to February 16. If the shareholders in their February 11 meeting disapprove of the sales, BNP Paribas could withdraw from the sale and an alternate way of supplying credit would be required. There is a daily need for some €30 to 40 billion credit, with the Belgian state, in the case of an emergency, able to provide up to €150 billion. Also there is the matter of assuring the clients of Fortis Bank of the continuity of the company, so as to avoid a run on the bank. De Standaard counters this: there is no special activity at Fortis Bank this weekend, work on the plan B started weeks ago. Also there is no need for liquidity support: BNP Paribas still is ready to provide support, but at the moment it is not needed. Furthermore, it was announced that the Dutch-language court action (announced on January 20) has been started; the initial court-session is scheduled for February 20.
- February 8, Ping An (holding some 5% of Fortis shares) announced that it will vote against the sales, at the February 11 meeting. Modrikamen expects that this assures there is a majority against the sales: he represents some 10% of the shares, Ping An has 5% and typically only 25% of the capital is represented at a meeting of shareholders. De Tijd reports that the Belgian government has decided that in case the meeting of shareholders rejects the sales, it will cancel the €3 billion loan that Fortis needed to fund its share in the portfolio of toxic credits. It is thought that this will create liquidity problems for Fortis, and that the Belgian state will perforce get ownership of both Fortis Bank and Fortis Insurance Belgium, thus the shareholders had better vote in favor, in which case they will have at least the insurance company. Het Financieele Dagblad agrees with Modrikamen: the meeting will vote against, in which case BNP Paribas will withdraw (as indicated by Prot in the interview of February 7). The Belgian Prime Minister has announced yet another renegotiated deal (drawn up in response to the news of Ping An), which will be submitted to the meeting of shareholders.
- Monday February 9, the Dutch Ondernemingskamer denied the request from Euroshareholders to force Fortis to also allow the February 13 meeting (at Utrecht) to vote on the sales. In an analysis by De Standaard it is pointed out that the campaign by the Belgian government to scare the shareholders into voting in favor is not without risk. It creates the spectre of Fortis Bank being in trouble, and this may affect the image of the bank, just now when Fortis Bank is doing well (with liquidity problems a thing of the past). What is actually at stake is the creditability of the Belgian government, especially financially; it may need to pick up the tab, and the more it scares financiers, the higher the interests they will demand. Nevertheless, the government appears committed to a policy of punishing the shareholders (for not supervising the board of Fortis or for speculating by buying Fortis shares) and protecting the customers.
- February 10, Het Financieele Dagblad published an interview with Hessels, acting chairman of the board of Fortis, in which he states that a vote against the sales would result in the bankruptcy of Fortis. The October contracts that Fortis has engaged in, dictated by the Belgian government, result in an immediate €2,3 billion deficit. These contracts may be, or become, illegitimate (if they are not approved by the shareholders), but it may take a very long time to resolve the legal maze. By executing the existing contracts the Belgian government can force Fortis into immediate bankruptcy. A vote in favor of the January 30 deal will provide immediate clarity, and an assured future as an insurance company, as then the Belgian government will assume financial responsibility for much of the worst problems. This is also the point of view of the Belgian Minister of Finance: a vote against may leave the shareholders empty-handed. This threat worked on the VEB, which like the VFB and Dolor, announced to vote in favor of the January 30 deal. However, it is going to vote against the sale to the Dutch government, still hoping for a better deal there. It is reported that Modrikamen represents 2400 shareholders, holding 0.6% of the capital. An initiative of Fortis employees by the name of "Fortis Front" announced they too represent 2400 shareholders: they will vote in favor of the January 30 deal. An independent agency (the same as above) has held a survey among leaders of industry and science: they favor a standalone scenario for Fortis Bank. More than half of those questioned indicate they don't have enough information on either the January 30 deal or on what will happen if the meeting votes against the sales. Trade in the share is suspended on February 11, until Fortis publishes the results of the meeting.
- February 11, it was reported that the Belgian government tried to get the right to vote the 125 million Fortis shares issued in October in connection with the CASHES, without the right to vote (voting rights are suspended until the CASHES are paid for). These shares are held by Fortis Bank. Lawyers that were consulted responded negatively, but the government nevertheless appealed to the board of Fortis on Wednesday afternoon; the request tied up the board for hours. Het Financieele Dagblad reports that Hessels, acting chairman of the board of Fortis, expects additional payments from the Dutch government: it concerns €2 billion worth of convertible bonds, which are due to be converted in 2010 into Fortis's shares at a fixed price of €18.74 per share. At the current share price, this would represent €160 million worth of shares, but the implementation of the contract is not straightforward, as shares of Fortis Bank Nederland are involved. At the time the contract was drawn up, that was a non-issue as Fortis Bank held all the shares of Fortis Bank Nederland, but it is less clear now.

==== February 11 (and 13) meetings of shareholders ====
On January 16, the Belgian Official Journal published the agenda for the February 11 (and 13) meeting of shareholders. At the February 11 meeting in Brussels, the shareholders may approve or disapprove three decisions:

- the sale on October 3 to the Dutch
- the sale on October 10 of the remaining half of Fortis Bank to the Belgian government
- the transactions with BNP Paribas, both the sale by Fortis of Fortis Insurance Belgium and the sale by the Belgian government of 75% of Fortis Bank.

In addition there is a vote on the composition of the Board of Directors, with especially the candidacy of Georges Ugeux noteworthy, being the candidate put forward by the small shareholders to lead the renewed Fortis back into the black. At the February 13 meeting in Utrecht, the shareholders may vote only on the composition of the Board of Directors and on an alteration of the Articles of Association. If less than 50% of the capital is represented at the meeting this last item will not be put to the vote, but another meeting will be organized within four weeks.

The Shareholder Circular for the February 11 meeting was published on January 30: it was dated January 29, but its publication was delayed pending the renegotiations (see above). At the time of publication the Circular had not been adjusted for the result of the renegotiations, but this is expected to be done shortly. In the circular it is explained that the shareholders are allowed to vote against the sales, but that this will not necessarily result in stopping the sales, as binding contracts exist. Fortis announced that it is unable to alter the agenda of the meeting.

On January 31, Fortis published an addendum to the Circular, giving the details of the January 30-deal. According to the Addendum, the court-appointed Committee of five Belgian experts has been informed of the results of the renegotiations; they agree that the results are in line with their recommendations (laid down in the report published on January 27) and the Committee recommends that the shareholders vote in favor. Fortis feels that an alteration of the agenda is unnecessary: a vote in favor is a vote in favor of the amended deal. On February 5, this was followed up with a simplified Q&A, setting out the basic options to be voted on.

Some 7000 shareholders registered, and some 5000 (which would be a record for Belgium) were physically present; in addition there were some 120 (to 180?) reporters., with some 20 television crews. The start of the meeting was grim, with security out in force. A shareholder was ejected five minutes after the opening of the meeting. At the meeting, 20.32% of the capital was represented: this did not include the 125 million non-voting shares held by Fortis Bank. The board offered to allow the meeting to decide on letting these shares vote, but the meeting rejected adding this to the agenda. Finally, Fortis Bank withdrew the request. By that time, the atmosphere had considerably worsened. The meeting went to a vote on 15.16h and quickly rejected the sales. The vote in favor of selling to the Dutch government was 42.99%; the vote in favor of selling to the Belgian government was 49.74%. After rejecting the sales, the meeting went on to vote on the appointments to the board: three of the candidates withdrew (because of the vote on the sales). Of the others, Jozef De Mey, Georges Ugeux and Jan Zegering Hadders were voted in, with only the candidacy of Ugeux being close (56.75%); their appointment requiring confirmation by the February 13 meeting in Utrecht.

Het Financieele Dagblad reports that the Dutch ABP, holding 50 million shares, abstained (the difference between the vote in favor and against was a little over 2 million shares). After unsuccessful attempts to negotiate with the Belgian government and BNP Paribas, it found it could not vote in favor, as the sale of Fortis Bank had clearly been for too low a price; it could not vote against as it was completely unclear what would happen with Fortis if it did vote against.

The February 13 meeting was uneventful, with only a few hundred participants. It confirmed the three appointments to the board. When it became clear that Ugeux would not become chairman, he stepped down.

==== Response to the February 11 meeting ====
Immediately following the February 11 meeting the main participants emphasized maintaining their earlier point of view; also that the customers of Fortis Bank had nothing to worry about. Core members of cabinet held a two-hour meeting, with no decision published. BNP Paribas announced it will keep to the existing contract until it expires, February 28; and if a takeover of Fortis Bank can be realized quickly it will proceed to do so anyway. BNP Paribas put the blame on Ping An. Many others put the blame on the government's attempt to vote the 125 million non-voting shares, which created a furor of protest. Pre-meeting analyses suggested that a majority was inclined to vote in favor, and that only a small extra gesture by the government (such as bringing into Fortis any increase in value over the purchase price of the 25% of Fortis Bank held by the government) would have assured victory; instead the government went the other way. An analyst assumes the government made the effort in anticipation of a lawsuit by BNP Paribas, to establish that it had left no stone unturned.

The opposition parties represented in Belgian parliament stated that this established that the Belgian government was now proven to have failed totally; it demanded that the cabinet, or at least the Minister of Finance Reynders, should step down.

The CEO of Fortis Bank, Dierckx, stated that the bank was doing well with no immediate solvency or liquidity problems. Over 2008 the bank had realized an underlying profit of €1.2 billion, although one-time write-offs caused a different end-total. Under normal circumstances the bank will bring in €1.7 billion a year.

A key issue to the immediate future of Fortis is the portfolio of toxic credits, with De Boeck taking the position that there is an existing contract, resulting in an immediately imminent bankruptcy of Fortis, while the newly elected Ugeux arguing that the portfolio belongs to Fortis Bank and was split off only after (and as part of) the now illegitimate sale of Fortis Bank to the Belgian government: for the immediate future it is the worry of the Belgian government, and Fortis is doing fine.

==== After the February 11 meeting ====
Thursday February 12, trade in the share was resumed, opening at €1.10 (and closing at €1.11), down from the €1.32 close on Tuesday. It is announced that the Belgian government will meet with representatives of the Dutch, French and Luxembourg governments, as well as of BNP Paribas and Fortis. A joint press conference by the Belgian and French Prime Ministers will follow. In parliament the Prime Minister was engaged in a fierce defence, particularly in the matter of the attempt to vote the 125 million non-voting shares. He emphasized that the government had inquired into the matter, but that the actual push to have the meeting approve this was done by Fortis Bank, not by the government. All the opposition parties demanded that the Minister of Finance step down. Modrikamen achieved an additional victory in court: he was allowed to change the correspondence address of all the shareholders he represented to their individual addresses (as he did on December 16). A Dutch lawyer requested an injunction against the Dutch state: as the sale of the Dutch parts of Fortis is now illegitimate, any further actions concerning these parts any further actions should be frozen, pending the renegotiations and court actions.

- Following the meetings, on Saturday 14 February, Standard & Poor's lowered the credit rating of Fortis holding substantially, which will make it harder for the company to attract credit.
- February 17, in a meeting with the trade unions, the Belgian Prime Minister let it be known that the Belgian government is investigating two options for Fortis Bank: 1) a take-over by BNP Paribas or 2) a stand-alone scenario.
- February 18, the new chairman of the board of Fortis, De Mey, announced that he would fight for every cent, and that his first priority was the renegotiations with the Belgian government and BNP Paribas. Later that day, after a meeting with newly elected members of the Fortis board, it was reported that the Belgian Prime Minister had succeeded in convincing them to continue negotiations with BNP Paribas.
- February 20, the new CEO of ABN-AMRO, Zalm, let it be known he is aiming to sell the Dutch business activities of Fortis back to Fortis Bank, in exchange for some other activities (presumably ex-ABN AMRO parts). Thus he hopes to comply with EU-provisions on market share, even if ABN-AMRO holds on to the business activities that previously were scheduled to be sold to Deutsche Bank. This was followed immediately by a protest of representatives of the trade unions on behalf of the employees of Fortis Bank Nederland, who felt excluded from the new company.
- February 23, Fortis dismantles the Foundation that ensured it could not be taken over by a hostile party buying itself large amounts of stock.
- February 24, De Tijd reports that a rumor is circulating that if Fortis Bank remains independent (the 'stand alone' scenario) this will cost 5500 jobs within 3 years. Earlier it had been reported that a take-over by BNP Paribas would cost 3000 jobs. The renegotiations between the Belgian government, Fortis and BNP Paribas, started on Friday, dragged on, but it was announced that a break would be taken, and talks would not resume that evening.
- February 27, it was announced that the deadline for a deal with BNP Paribas had been moved up a week from the original February 28 date. The deal being negotiated reportedly resembled the January 30 deal but features BNP Paribas taking a 25% interest in Fortis Insurance Belgium.
- March 1, the Belgian Prime Minister commented in a television programme that the Belgian government was prepared to nationalize Fortis Bank outright, if the deal with BNP Paribas fell through. However, he was optimistic that a viable deal was being negotiated.
- March 4, it is reported that after the fall of LeTerme I, the new Minister of Justice, De Clerck had been asked to overturn the December 12 court decision: he refused. His predecessor vanDeurzen had been exposed to extreme pressure, it even being suggested that he step aside temporarily, transferring his powers to a more willing Minister who would then do what was expedient; he stepped down altogether.
- March 5, Fortis Bank announces that the loss over the fourth quarter is over €1 billion higher than expected, making for a loss of €20 billion over 2008.
- March 7, after a week filled with rumours, posturing, proposals and counterproposals, it was announced that the talks started on February 21 had been successfully concluded and a new deal had been reached. This is almost exactly the same as the January 30 deal, except that Fortis is not selling 10% of Fortis Insurance Belgium to BNP Paribas but 25% to Fortis Bank (financed by BNP Paribas). The new deal is subject to shareholder approval, with meetings in April (April 8 and 9 being suggested). Part of the deal is that there is the option that the government may provide extra funds to Fortis Bank, if needed, up to €2 billion, in exchange for shares, up to a 49.9% stake in the company.
- March 10, the Belgian government is reported to anticipate that Fortis Bank will indeed require the extra funds, this year. After visiting Ping An, Chairman De Mey of the Fortis Holding reports that Ping An has not yet decided if it approves of the new deal. The other parties have mostly not changed their earlier position, but the pre-October 14 shareholders hold only 22% and BNP Paribas expects a landslide victory among the 'new' shareholders.
- March 13, it is announced that the next meeting of shareholders (April 8 and 9) can decide on five new directors proposed for the board. Acting on behalf of shareholders, the Dutch FortisEffect has started its court action against the Dutch and Belgian governments, Fortis and Fortis Bank Nederland, with a trial date hopefully in May.
- March 15, Fortis made two announcements. Firstly its loss over 2008 is expected to be €22.5 billion (up from an earlier projected loss of €20 billion) and that it won't pay out a dividend; the latter has consequences for the CASHES and FRESH, and Fortis expects to issue extra shares, some time in the future. Secondly, that the memorandum of understanding with Ping An has expired last Friday; this means among other things that Ping An is free to sell its Fortis shares. It is also apparent that Fortis has changed the address of its website from www.fortis.com to www.holding.fortis.com.
- March 16, in an interview, Fortis CEO De Boeck indicates that Fortis is aiming to be an insurance company only, and not a small one (it has an annual income of €12 billion now); it aims to expand. However, within two years it will no longer be called Fortis (as that name has been sold).
- March 20, Fortis let it be known that in the following week further negotiations will take place with Fortis Bank and BNP Paribas, concerning the portfolio of structured credits and the way it will be financed.
- March 26, Fortis Bank Nederland announced a loss of €18.5 billion from 2008 (separate from the €22.5 billion loss projected by its former mother-company Fortis), mostly because of a €17.7 billion write-off on ABN-AMRO; it booked an operational profit of €0.6 billion (excluding write-offs). As the court is now obliged to address its mail to all the (circa 2400) shareholders represented by Modrikamen separately, it checked all the addresses and came up with several dozen errors, including two persons who are deceased. Responding to a rumor (by Modrikamen) that it had bought up to 9% of the Fortis shares, so as to vote on the upcoming meeting of shareholders, BNP Baribas let it be known that it controlled 0.35% voting shares (directly and indirectly) and that daughter-companies held a further 0.23%, which however it did not control, as they would vote independently.
- March 31, Fortis announced its definite result for 2008, a loss of €28 billion (up from the projection of a loss of €22.5 billion of March 15). The insurance activities did make an operational profit of €6 million. Later the same day, the court of appeal at Brussels ruled in favor of Modrikamen so that at the April 8 and 9 meetings of shareholders the vote on the take-over would be restricted to those who held shares on October 14, that is the same who could vote on February 11.
- April 1, as a result of the court ruling, Fortis expects to defer either the meetings or the decision on the take-over.
- April 2, ASR Insurance, formerly the Dutch branch of Fortis insurance, reports a loss over 2008 of €640 million. Fortis confirms that the new vote on the takeover will be moved to April 28 and 29.
- April 8, the European Commission, the executive branch of the European Union, announces that it will look into the take-over to see if the Dutch government has given any undue advantage to those parts that it took over, providing an undue competitive edge prohibited by European law.
- April 10, the appeal by Fortis, on the grounds of the third-party rule, against the decision to restrict voting on the take-over to those who held shares on October 14 was granted. In addition the request to add the stand-alone scenario for Fortis Bank to the agenda of the meeting was denied.

==== The April 28 and 29 meetings ====
On the eve of the April 28 meeting Modrikamen sought an injunction to exclude 170 million shares from voting; these were registered on the Cayman Islands and looked fishy. The Court denied this. The April 28 meeting, in Ghent, was attended by some 3000 shareholders; Modrikamen personally held a speech that led to the board being pelted with shoes and coins. The meeting was adjourned and remained boisterous after being resumed. In the end the sale was approved by some 73%. In contrast the April 29 meeting, in Utrecht, was calm, being attended by some 300 shareholders (who did represent more of the capital than the 3000 in Ghent); here too the issue of the 170 million shares was raised and this meeting also approved the sale, by some 78%.

==== After the April 28 and 29 meetings ====
- On May 12, the EU decided that the take-over by Belgium and Luxembourg was not counter to EU-regulations.
- May 13, at its meeting of shareholders, BNP Paribas reported that Fortis Bank has lost 10% of its deposits over the past six months.
- May 14, Fortis reports a €44 million profit over the first quarter. In a book announced to appear on May 16 (Bankroet. Hoe Fortis al zijn krediet verspeelde) it is revealed that, after the first, September rescue, Hessels personally informed the Dutch government about the Belgian government securing the Dutch insurance company as collateral. This served as a pretext, if not a reason, for the Dutch government to renegotiate, resulting in the break-up.

=== Later developments ===
On July 13, 2018, the Amsterdam Court of Appeal (Gerechtshof Amsterdam) approved a €1.3 billion collective settlement of claims asserted on behalf of shareholders of the former Fortis (now Ageas), under the authority of the Dutch Act on Collective Settlement of Mass Claims (Wet Collectieve Afwikkeling van Massaschade) or WCAM.

On December 20, 2018, the prosecutor decided to drop the case against seven former directors. The prosecution argued that it found insufficient evidence that they knowingly misled shareholders with over-optimistic company information.

== See also ==
- Fortis Bank Nederland
- List of banks in Belgium
