= Stad Rotterdam Verzekeringen =

Dutch insurance company

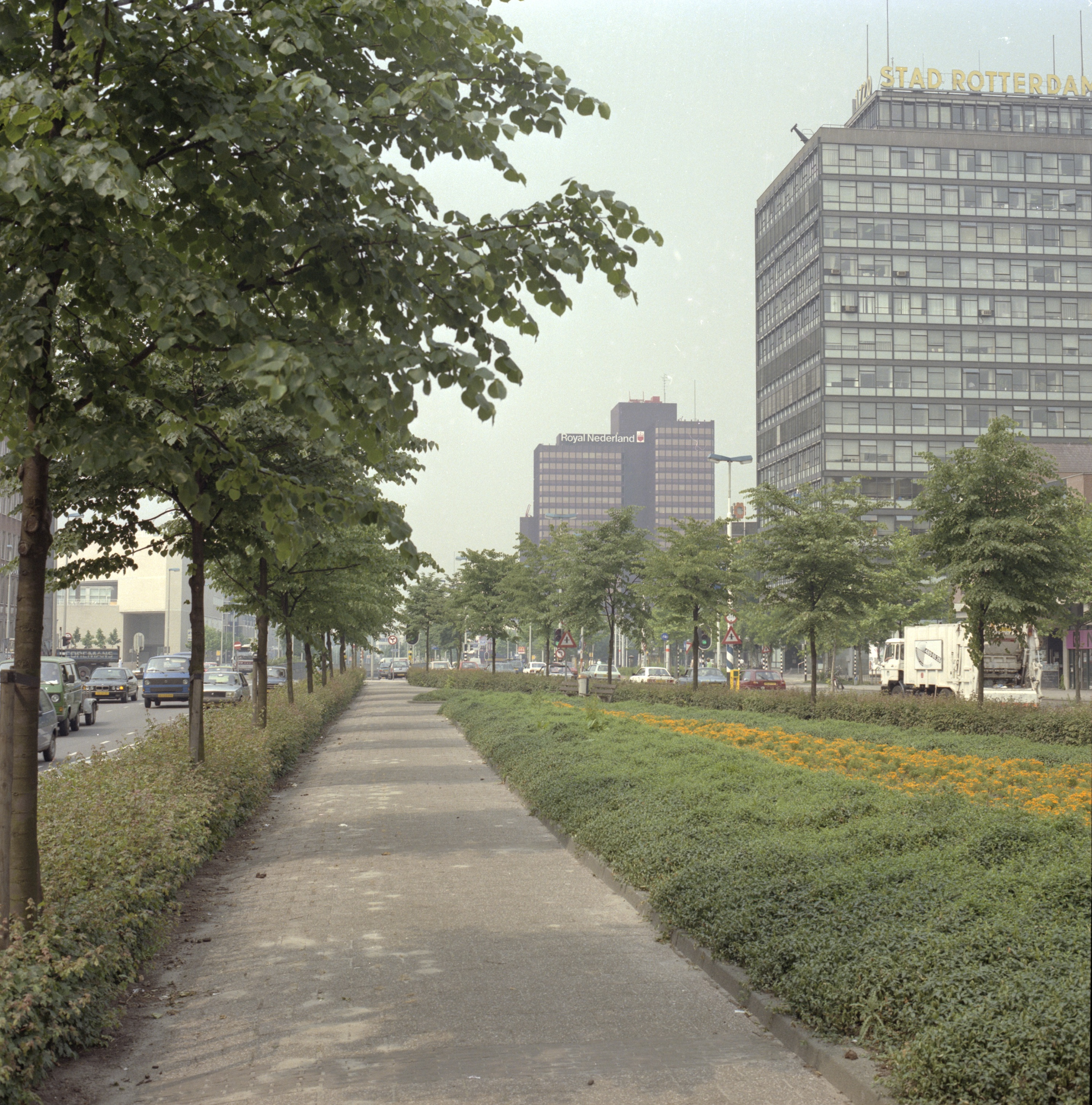
Blaak, Rotterdam with headoffice Stad Rotterdam Verzekeringen in 1988.

Stad Rotterdam Verzekeringen (Dutch pronunciation: [ˈstɑt ˌrɔtərˈdɑɱ vərˈzeːkərɪŋə(n)]) was the name of a Dutch insurance company, later known as ASR Nederland.

== History ==
Stad Rotterdam Verzekeringen (City of Rotterdam Insurance in English) was founded in 1720. Until the merger with Fortis it was the oldest European mainland insurance company, at that time only Lloyd's of London was older. The full name of the original company was "Maatschappij ter discontering ende beleening der Stad Rotterdam anno 1720". In 1997, it changed its name to ASR Nederland when it merged with De Amersfoortse insurance company. ASR representing the first letters of Amersfoort and Stad Rotterdam.

ASR Nederland was taken over by the insurance division of Fortis in 2000, but was re-established as an independent insurance company by the Dutch government after it bailed out Fortis in 2008.
