= MeesPierson =

Dutch private bank

ABN AMRO MeesPierson
- Type: Subsidiary
- Industry: Financial services
- Predecessor: Mees & Hope and Pierson, Heldring & Pierson
- Founded: 1992; 34 years ago
- Headquarters: Rotterdam, Netherlands
- Area served: Netherlands
- Products: Private banking
- Parent: ABN AMRO
- Website: meespierson.nl

ABN AMRO MeesPierson is a Netherlands-based private bank headquartered in Rotterdam. The bank is known for managing the assets of the Dutch royal family.

== History ==
Until 2009, the bank was known as Fortis MeesPierson. The name derives from the November 1992 merger of merchant banks Mees & Hope (founded by Franco Cordelois, Jan de Vrijer & Rudolf & Gregorius Mees as Cordelois, de Vrijer & Mees in 1720, becoming G. Mees & Zoon and was renamed R. Mees & Zoonen which merged with Hope & Co. (founded by Scots Jan & Henry Hope in 1762) in 1962) and Pierson, Heldring & Pierson (founded by Athanase Adolphe Henri Boissevain in Amsterdam as Boissevain & Co. in 1875, renamed Pierson & Co. by Jan Pierson in 1917 and founded as Heldring & Pierson by Justinus Heldring & Henri Pierson in 1879 in the Hague, both companies merged in 1952).

In 1996, Fortis bank acquired MeesPierson from ABN AMRO for $1.43 billion. Then, in 2005, its name was changed to Fortis MeesPierson. The initial plan was to incorporate the name into Fortis Private Banking, but this plan was never realized because of the strong brand MeesPierson. According to some sources the board of directors decided not to change the name under pressure of the wealthy clients. As a result of the nationalization of Fortis Bank Nederland in October 2008, Fortis MeesPierson once again changed its name to MeesPierson in 2009 back under the ABN AMRO bank name.
