= Fortis Bank Nederland =

Dutch financial service corporation

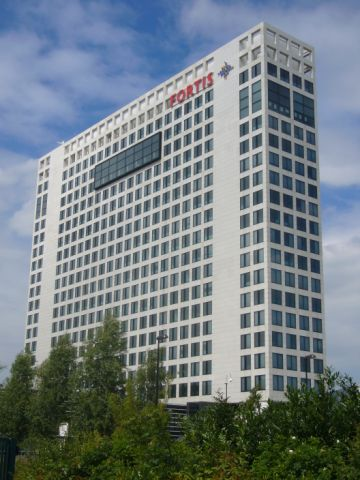
Head office building in Utrecht, 2008

Fortis Bank Nederland (Holding) N.V. was a bank in the Netherlands until 2010.

The holding came into being within Fortis Group, as a holding for those Dutch banks taken over by Fortis. In September–October 2008, the Dutch government first planned to invest €4 billion in exchange for an almost 50% interest in the holding (in new-to-be-issued shares), but within a week the agreement was cancelled. The Dutch government took over all the Dutch parts of Fortis for a total of €16.8 billion; in this take-over, Fortis Bank Nederland was valued at €5 billion.

Later, Fortis Bank Nederland appeared in the news because it had lost €1 billion in the Madoff investment scandal. In March 2009, it reported that during 2008 it had an operational profit of €0.6 billion; this excluded (massive) write-offs.

In February 2010 Fortis Bank Nederland was integrated into the new ABN AMRO by the Dutch Government and some parts were sold off. On the July 1 that year the integration was officially completed and the Fortis name ended.

== Former subsidiaries ==
- Fortis Commercial Finance (FCF)
- Finodis
- MeesPierson - private bank
- Intertrust Group, formerly known as Fortis Intertrust

== See also ==
- Fortis Group
- ABN AMRO
- BNP Paribas Fortis
- List of banks in the Netherlands
