= Georges Ugeux =

Belgian-American banker

Georges Ugeux is a dual citizen of Belgium, his native country, and the United States, and was Group Executive Vice President of the New York Stock Exchange from 1996 to 2003. His banking career began in the 1970s in Europe, and he is currently the CEO of Galileo Global Advisors, a New York-based investment bank catering to emerging markets. He is a notable member of the Belgian diaspora, due to his influence in the world of international finance. He is a frequent public speaker and an op-ed contributor to the Huffington Post and a blogger on Medium.

== Early life ==
Born in 1945 in Belgium, Ugeux's upbringing was in French. In the late 1960s he studied at Université catholique de Louvain, graduating in Economics and Doctor of Law. He told the newspaper Le Soir in 1995 that, at that time, he had been deeply troubled by the language feud known as Walen Buiten, and, consequently, he embraced the European ideal.

== Career ==
Georges Ugeux began his financial career in 1970 at Société Générale de Banque, headquartered in Brussels, rising to the position of head of the investment banking and trust division. In 1985, he served as Managing Director of Morgan Stanley's mergers and acquisitions in London.

In 1988, he was appointed Group Finance Director at Société Générale de Belgique. In 1992, he became President and Managing Director of Kidder, Peabody & Co. for Europe. In this role, he advises governments on privatization programs. He began serving as President of the European Investment Fund in June 1994. In 1995, he takes the helm of an organization, under the authority of Belgium's ministry of finance, that, as part of a privatization program that began in 1992, makes an inventory of government assets to be sold.

Georges Ugeux joined the New York Stock Exchange in September 1996, as Group Executive Vice President, International & Research, a financial news outlet labeling him "the face of the New York Stock Exchange outside of the United States".

In 2003, he resigned amidst the NYSE compensation controversy. He claimed it was a coincidence because he had planned his departure in order to start a business, and defended his record as follows : "the NYSE listed 300 non-U.S. companies with a value of $2.7 trillion".

In 2003, Georges Ugeux founded an investment banking advisory firm, Galileo Global Advisors, and, since then, has been its CEO. The company caters primarily, but not exclusively, to Asian clients, such as the Guangzhou municipality.

In the wake of the 2009 legal fallout of Fortis, a Belgian financial services conglomerate, Georges Ugeux pursued the chairmanship of its board, but rapidly abandoned it due to a deadlock in the negotiations between the different parties.

In 2011, Georges Ugeux' company joined the Institute of International Finance, which he doesn't see as banking lobby, and he was involved in the negotiations on Greece's debt restructuring, a saga that crystallized tensions in the Euro zone.

== Writing ==
Georges Ugeux is a regular blog author for the Huffington Post and the author of a Le Monde blog, Démystifier la Finance, Ethiques et Marchés. In the second half of 2011, his blog rose to the heights of popularity, in its category, while its coverage focused on Greece's debt restructuring, the negotiations of which Georges Ugeux was privy to (see section on Career), and its deleterious effects on the eurozone. Sometimes, his writing contains vitriolic rhetoric: "In his Le Monde blog, Georges Ugeux asks if the French president is in reality the president of the French banks", reported Eurointelligence in October 2011.

=== Financial crisis ===
Georges Ugeux, who had promoted the NYSE's self-regulatory organization internationally as a senior official of the exchange, later deplored the "magistral failure" brought upon by the myth of auto-regulation in the financial sector, in 2009. This view is developed in a book published in 2010, The betrayal of finance: twelve reforms to restore confidence., available in Dutch, English (2011) and French.

=== Eurozone debt crisis ===
Georges Ugeux stands in stark opposition to the claim of economists such as Paul Krugman (whom he accuses of making bold predictions out of concern for his own image) that Greece leaving the Eurozone, a topical issue in the middle of 2012, would have a net benefit for the country's economy. His reasoning is that the gains from a devaluation of the Greek drachma would be offset by the corresponding increase in the relative value of the outstanding debt in Euro (issued before the currency switch), whether public or private.

== Other ==
- Adjunct faculty at Columbia Law School, since 2012
- Joined the International Advisory Council of APCO Worldwide in 2011, as part of the firm's expansion into global finance.
- The company he is the CEO of, Galileo Global Advisors, joined the Institute of International Finance in 2011
- Sits on the board of directors of Amoeba Capital
- Sits on the board of directors of British American Business, Inc., since at least 2010
- Sits on the International Advisory Board Oxford Analytica, since at least 2009
- Honorary Ambassador of the Foreign Investment Promotion for South Korea
- Honorary Chairman of the Belgian American Chamber of Commerce
- Advisor of the board of the SEC Historical Society, projected for 2014
- Chairman of the Catholic University of Louvain Foundation
- Officer of the Order of Leopold since 2004

== Bibliography ==
- Ugeux, Georges (1985). Floating rate notes. Euromoney. ISBN 9780903121804. Archived from the original on 2016-12-01.
