= ASR Nederland =

Dutch insurance company

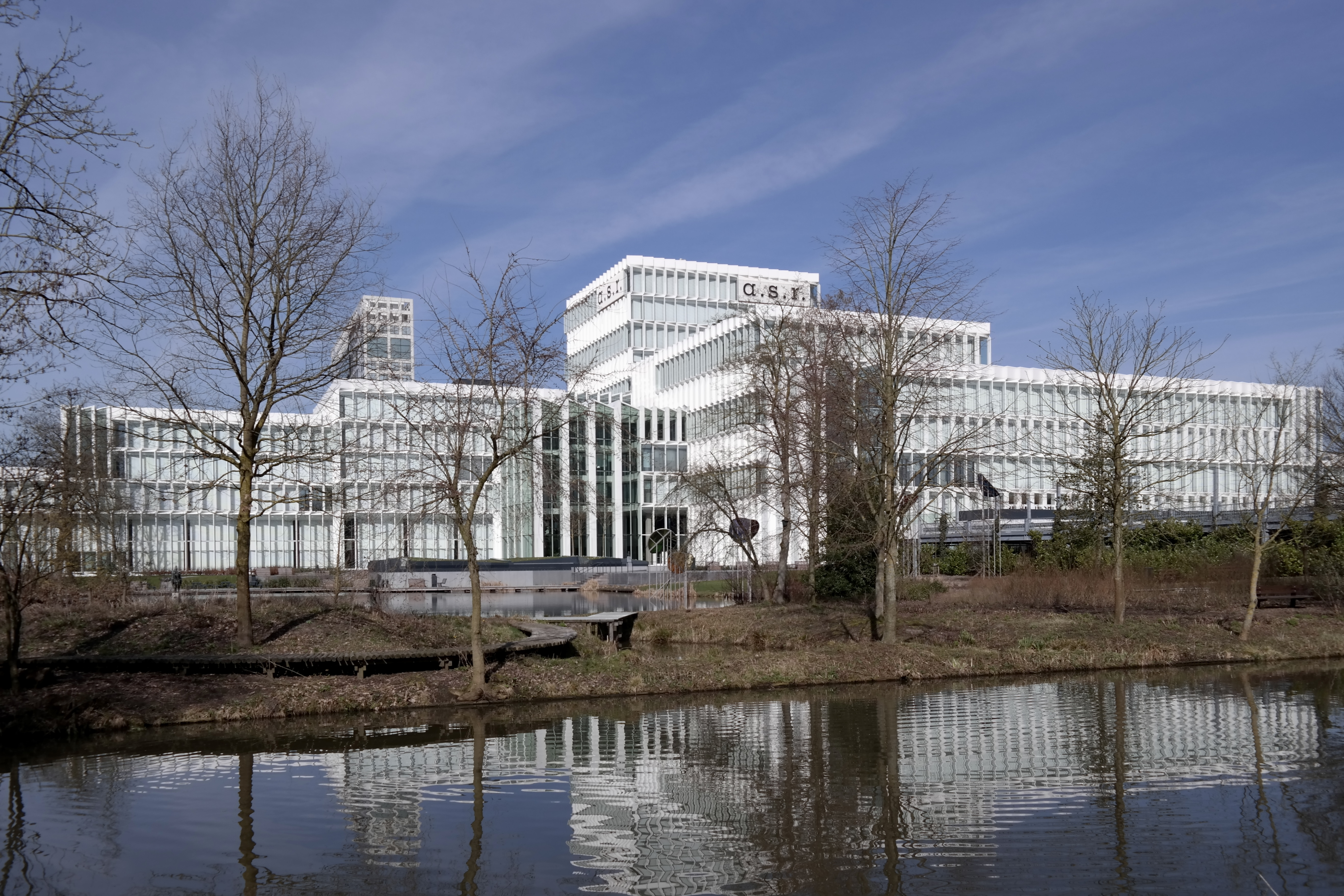
- Headquarters in Utrecht.
- Type: Public
- Traded as: Euronext Amsterdam: ASRNL; AEX component
- ISIN: ISIN: NL0011872643
- Headquarters: Utrecht
- Website: www.asr.nl

ASR Nederland is a major Dutch insurance group based in Utrecht. The company was created in its current form in 2008 when the insurance business was split out of Fortis, after it was acquired by the Dutch government during the 2008 financial crisis. The Dutch government revived the old name that had been used prior to the acquisition by Fortis in 2000 for the newly structured company.

== History ==
The original ASR insurance company was formed in 1997 after the merger of Stad Rotterdam Verzekeringen (which dates back to 1720) and ETI Amersfoortse insurance companies. The new name ASR was based on a combination of initials of Amersfoort and Stad Rotterdam.

In 2000, Fortis acquired ASR insurance and merged it with its other insurance business to form Fortis ASR. At that time the other insurances business included the insurers Amev, Ardanta and Falcon (which included Interlloyd en VSB-leven).

In 2008, the insurance component became government owned when the Dutch Government took control of Fortis to prevent the bank and insurer from failing during the 2008 financial crisis.

On November 21, 2008, the Dutch Finance Minister, Wouter Bos announced that they would spin off Fortis Insurance Nederland NV using the revived name of ASR Nederland NV.

Fortis Corporate Insurance was sold separately and did not form part of ASR Nederland. The Belgium insurance business of Fortis was not part of this process and that business was split by the Belgium government to create the insurance company Ageas.

In 2025 asr acquired the portfolio of Onderlinge van 1719, the oldest Dutch funeral insurance company.

== Operations ==
ASR operates from four locations with a headquarters in Utrecht.

== See also ==
- ABN AMRO Group
