= CTF Life =

Chinese life insurance company based in Hong Kong

Chow Tai Fook Life Insurance Company Limited
- Type: Private
- Founded: 1985; 41 years ago in Hong Kong
- Headquarters: Hong Kong, China
- Key people: Man Kit Ip, CEO
- Products: Insurance
- Owner: CTF Services
- Number of employees: 400+
- Website: www.ctflife.com.hk

Chow Tai Fook Life Insurance Company Limited (CTF Life) is a Hong Kong insurance company that focuses on health insurance and life insurance products. It is a wholly owned subsidiary of Chinese conglomerate CTF Services listed in Hong Kong (HKEX Code: 0659).

== History ==
In 1994, NZI Life (Bermuda) Limited was acquired and renamed Top Glory Insurance Company (Bermuda) Limited (TGI). In the same year Pacific Century Group became the major shareholder of TGI.

In 1999, the company name was changed into Pacific Century Insurance. In July of the same year the Pacific Century Insurance Holdings Limited (PCIHL) was listed on The Stock Exchange of Hong Kong Limited. Pacific Century Insurance Company Limited (PCI) became the subsidiary operating life insurance and other insurance businesses.

In 2007, Pacific Century Regional Developments entered into an agreement with Fortis on the sale of Pacific Century Insurance. In August 2007, the company renamed as Fortis Insurance Company (Asia) Limited.

In July 2010, Fortis Insurance Company Asia Limited was renamed as Ageas Insurance Company (Asia) Limited to align with the new brand adopted by the parent company Ageas.

In May 2016, JD Group successfully acquired Ageas Insurance Company (Asia) Limited from Ageas Group. In September 2016, Ageas Insurance Company (Asia) Limited was renamed as FTLife Insurance Company Limited.

In November 2019, NWS Holdings Limited completed the acquisition of FTLife.

In July 2024, FT Life has been renamed to Chow Tai Fook Life (CTF Life).
