= Baudouin Prot =

French economist (born 1951)

- Born: 24 May 1951 (age 75); Paris, France
- Education: HEC Paris, ÉNA
- Occupations: Senior Advisor at Boston Consulting Group; Former CEO of BNP Paribas

Baudouin Prot (French: [bodwɛ̃ pʁo]; born 24 May 1951) is a French economist who was chairman of BNP Paribas' board of directors until December 2014. He is now a senior advisor at Boston Consulting Group and Partners Group.

== Early life ==
Prot was born 24 May 1951. He graduated from HEC Paris in 1972, and from the École nationale d'administration in 1976.

== Career ==
=== Public sector ===
From 1974 to 1983 Prot was successively the Deputy Prefect of the Franche-Comté region of France, French General Inspector of Finance, and the deputy director of Energy and Raw Materials of the Ministry of Industry.

=== Private banking ===
Prot joined Banque Nationale de Paris in 1983. After BNP merged with Paribas in 2000, he was appointed CEO in 2003. Together with his mentor Michel Pébereau, he built BNP into one of the eurozone’s biggest banks with €1.8 trillion in assets and more than 185,000 employees in 75 countries. He stepped down in 2011 to become chairman of the bank's Board of Directors.

When BNP had to pay $8.9 billion fine to US regulators for sanctions violations – the bank had illegally processed more than $30 billion of transactions for groups in Sudan, Iran and Cuba between 2002 and 2012 –, Prot was replaced by Jean Lemierre.

=== Consulting ===
In 2015, Baudouin Prot joined the Boston Consulting Group in Paris as a senior advisor.

== Other activities ==
=== Corporate boards ===
- Veolia, Independent Member of the Board of Directors (since 2003)
- Lafarge, Independent Member of the Board of Directors (2011-2015)
- Accor, Member of the Board of Directors (2004-2009)
- Pargesa Holding, Member of the Board of Directors (2004-2014)
- Pinault-Printemps-Redoute, Member of the Board of Directors (1998-2005)

=== Non-profit organizations ===
- Association Française des Banques, Chairman
- Institute of International Finance (IIF), Member

== Recognition ==
In 2006 Prot was awarded ‘Financier of the Year’, primarily in acknowledgement of the successful acquisition of Italian bank Banca Nazionale del Lavoro, which was executed in a record time. In 2007 Prot also picked up the ‘Social and Corporate Responsibility’ award by the Foreign Policy Association (FPA).

In April 2010, Prot became an Officer of the Légion d'honneur.

== See also ==
- BNP Paribas website
