= Hofje van Bakenes =

Hofje in Haarlem, Netherlands

Coordinates: 52°22′53″N 4°38′24″E

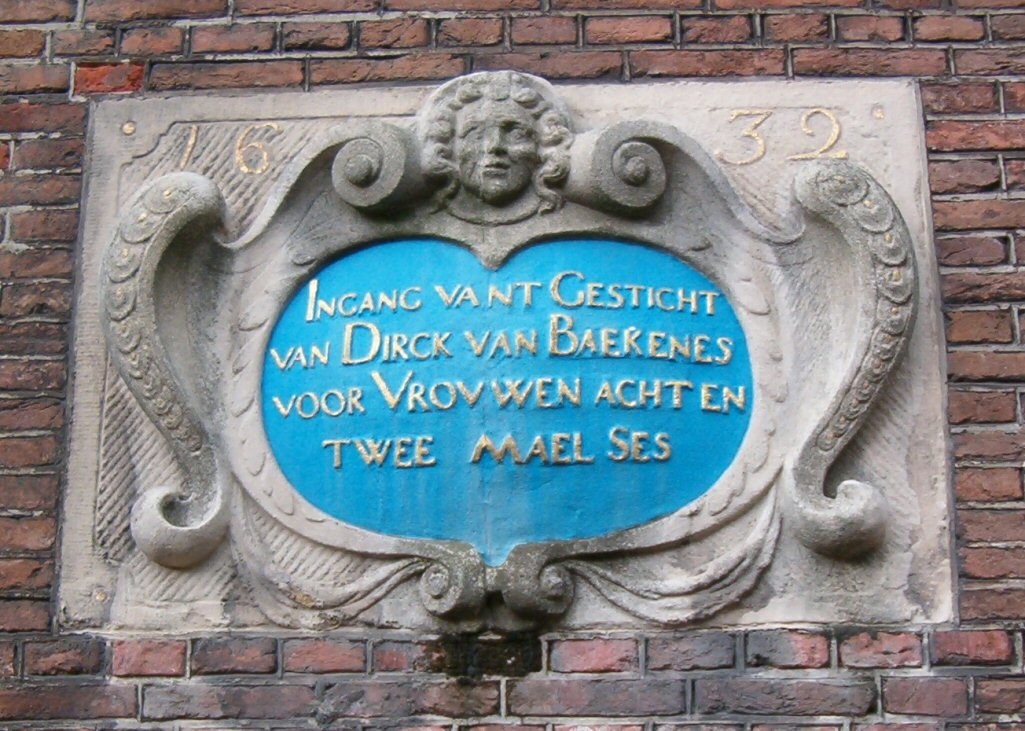
Poem above the entrance of the hofje at the Bakenessergracht: "Ingang van t Gesticht van Dirck van Baekenes voor Vrouwen acht en twee mael ses".

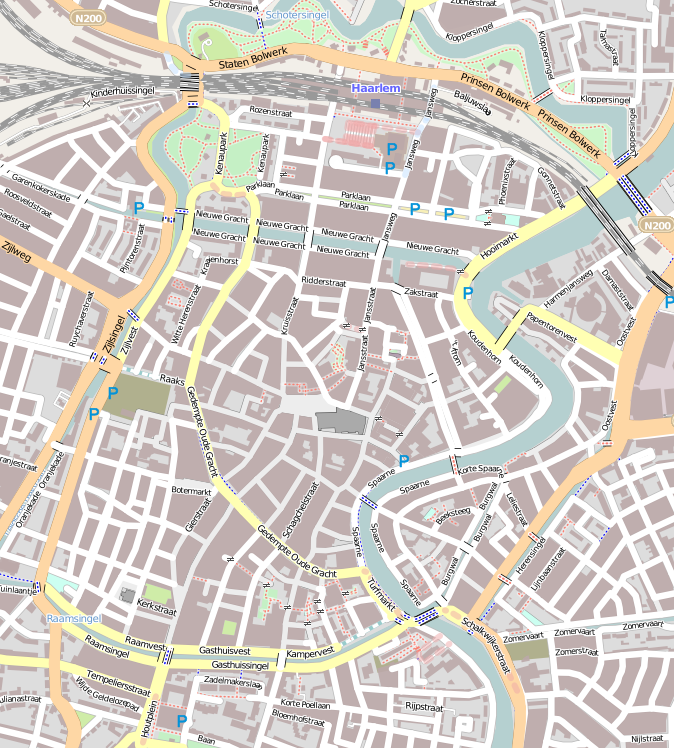
The Hofje van Bakenes is located between the Bakenessergracht and the Wijde Appelaarsteeg.

The Hofje van Bakenes or Bakenesserkamer is a hofje in Haarlem, Netherlands, located between the Bakenessergracht and the Wijde Appelaarsteeg. In the Middle Ages "kamer" or "room" meant house. Usually the houses within a hofje consisted of just one single room.

== History of the foundation ==
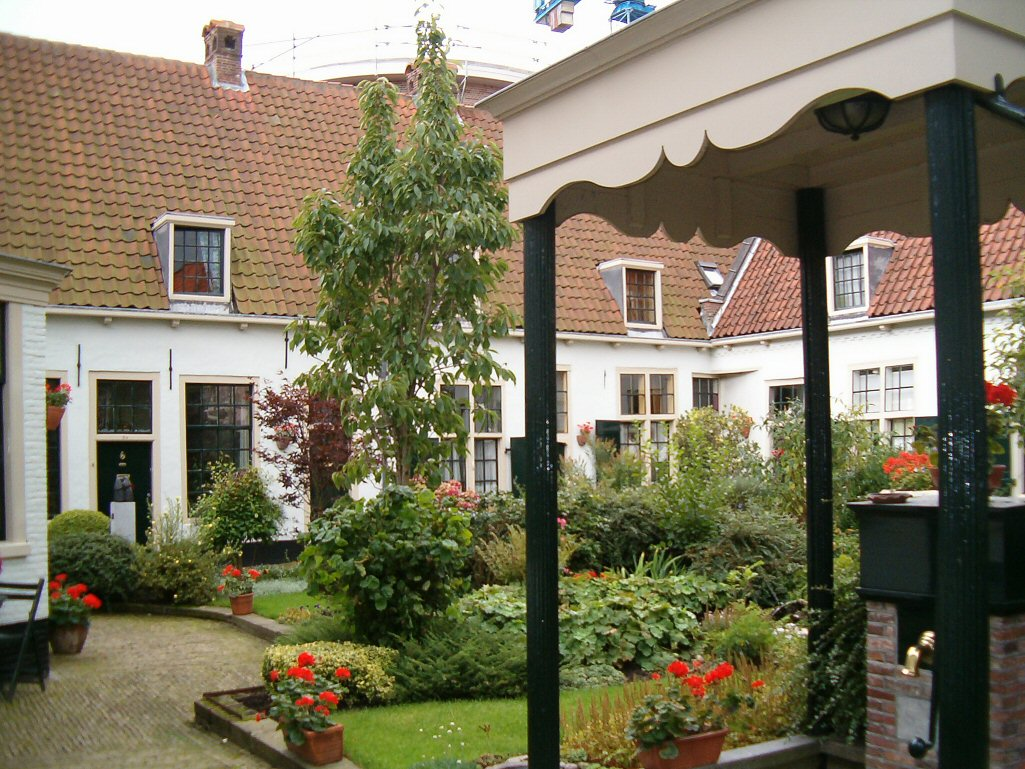
The Hofje van Bakenes.

The hofje was founded from the legacy of Dirck van Bakenes (or Dirc van Bakenesse) in 1395. This makes it the oldest hofje in the Netherlands. The earliest mention of it in town records is from the History of Haarlem by Samuel Ampzing in 1628, who claims to have copied the stichtingsbrief or letter of foundation (since lost). In the records of the Hofje van Gratie (torn down in 1960 to make way for the new wing of the Haarlem Public Library), their stichtingsbrief from 1554 claims to be governed in the same manner by the Haarlem council as the Hofje van Bakenes. Further records from the Haarlem archives show that the straw roofs were replaced by tiled ones in 1610, and a major restoration was conducted in 1657, which appears to be the proper date of the current buildings. Originally 13 houses for 20 women, one house was redesigned as a regent's room in 1663. This is also the date of the keystone with the rhyme Ingang vant Gesticht/ van Dirck van Baekenes/ voor Vrouwen acht en/ twee mael ses

Translation: Entrance of the foundation of Dirck van Baekenes for ladies eight and two times six

This has two meanings
m = (8 + 2) * 6 = 60 is the minimum age for ladies to be eligible for living there
n = 8 + (2 * 6) = 20 is the number of people who could live there

Address: Wijde Appelaarsteeg 11
