= Philippe Lambert =

Belgian banker and art collector (1930–2011)

Baron Philippe Lambert (March 1930 – September 2011) was a Belgian banker and art collector, of the Bank Brussels Lambert banking dynasty, and the husband of fellow art collector Baroness Marion Lambert.

He was born in March 1930, the son of Baron Henri Lambert (1887–1933) and Johanna von Reininghaus (1899–1960). He was the great-grandson of Baron James Mayer de Rothschild and the great-great-grandson of Samuel Lambert, who in 1840 established the family-owned Banque Lambert. Banque de Bruxelles and Banque Lambert merged in 1974, to form Banque Bruxelles Lambert, which was one of the largest banks in Belgium.

He had a brother Léon Lambert, also a banker and art collector (1928/29–1987), and a sister Lucy, based in Brussels.

== Personal life ==
He married Patricia Harris (born 1932), and they divorced in 1973. In 1962, and they had one child, Johanna Lambert.

He married Baroness Marion de Vries Lambert in 1975, and they had two children together, a son, Henri Lambert, and Philippine Lambert, who killed herself aged 20.

They lived in Geneva, Switzerland,

Philipe Lambert died in September 2011.
