= Léon Lambert =

Belgian art collector and private banker

The High Well-born The Baron Lambert
- Born: Léon Lambert; 2 July 1928; Etterbeek
- Died: 26 May 1987 (aged 58); Erasmus Hospital
- Resting place: Dieweg Cemetery

Léon Lambert, 3rd Baron Lambert (2 July 1928 – 28 May 1987) was a Belgian banker and art collector.

Single and without children, he devoted his whole life to his career which made him famous worldwide. When he died at the Erasmus hospital in Anderlecht on 28 May 1987, many press articles recounted the life of the man who had "united high finance and the arts".

== Early life and family ==
Léon Lambert, the eldest son of Henri Lambert and Johanna von Reininghaus, came from a large family of Belgian bankers that spanned three generations. The family's banking history began with Samuel Lambert, Leon's great-grandfather, who, following the second marriage of his mother-in-law to Lazare Richtenberger, the Rothschild's representative in Brussels, had been introduced to the world of finance. Very quickly, he founded Banque Lambert, which would become the privileged representative of the Rothschilds in Belgium. His son Léon (1851–1919), who was nicknamed the "king's banker", continued his father's work and financed a large part of Leopold II of Belgium's colonial projects. Subsequently, Léon's son Henri (1887–1933) succeeded his father, and it was under his leadership that Banque Lambert became independent from the Rothschilds to no longer simply be its Belgian branch.

Shortly following the birth of Léon Lambert, the eldest of the banking family's fourth generation, Banque Lambert seemed to be recovering from the shock of the stock market crash of 1929 and the crisis that followed. Very quickly, however, before he had reached his sixth birthday, Léon Lambert lost his father. It was the mother of the young child who took over the family business, awaiting the coming of age of her eldest son.

During the Second World War, Léon Lambert continued his education in Bern first, then in America. Once the war was over, he continued his graduate studies at Yale University, University of Oxford, and finally at the Graduate Institute of International Studies in Geneva, where he obtained his licence in 1950.

== Banking career ==
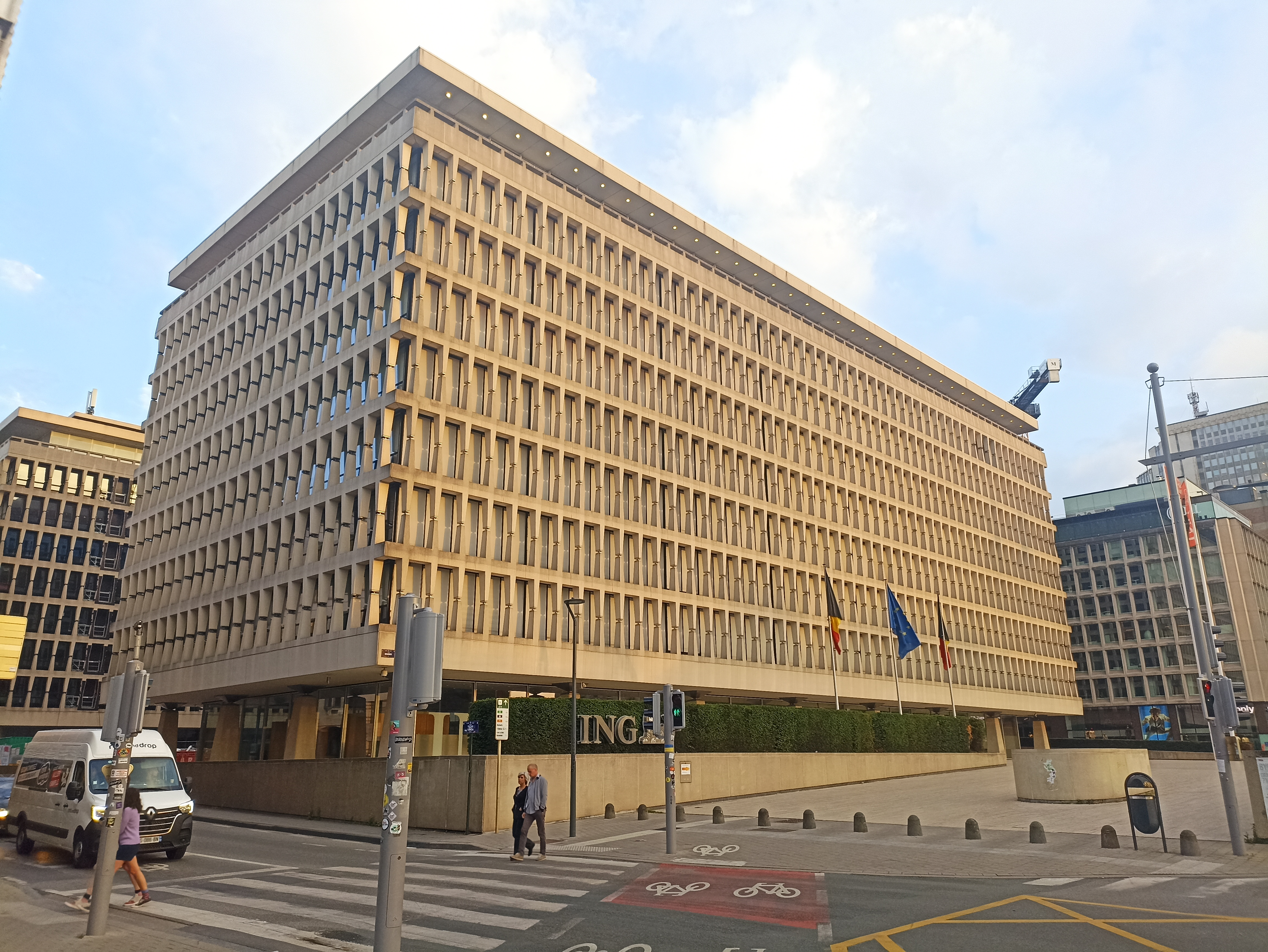
Head office building of Banque Lambert, designed by American architect Gordon Bunshaft and inaugurated in 1965, later seat of Banque Bruxelles Lambert and ING Belgium

In 1950, a year after reaching his civil majority, the young baron took over the management of Bank H. Lambert (de Lhoneux, De Bruyn et Cie), which he immediately set up as a limited partnership, naming it Banque Lambert.

Under his leadership, Banque Lambert experienced spectacular growth, which earned it, because of its young age, to be called the Minou Drouet of finance, Minou Drouet being then a poet who was very successful, although barely ten years old. It was also at this time that Camille Gutt, followed by Ernest de Selliers de Moranville joined Banque Lambert.

In the summer of 1953, Banque Lambert absorbed the Banque de Reports et de Dépôts, thus considerably increasing its capital. The same year, Léon Lambert founded the European Company for Industry and Finance, then turned to the Congolese colony for which he created the holding company Compagnie d’Afrique. This, after being absorbed by the European Company for Industry and Finance, became the Compagnie d'Outremer pour l’Industrie et la Finance. In 1959, Banque Lambert became the main shareholder of the Compagnie d’Outremer pour l'Industrie et la Finance which, during the 1960s, eventually took the name Compagnie Lambert pour l'Industrie et la Finance.

In 1960, when the Congo gained independence, he continued his business in the former colony by creating the Société Financière pour les Pays d'Outremer. The purpose of this company was to pool the risks that arose following the independence of sub-Saharan countries, but also to avoid the potential nationalization or confiscation of property belonging to the former colonial powers. In the course of his business in the Congo, he met with Mobutu Sese Seko, whom he described as "a cordial but firm interlocutor".

During the sixties, the career of Lambert was in full expansion. Banque Lambert absorbed many banks, and the baron sat on the boards of several dozen companies, directly or indirectly controlled by Banque Lambert. In 1964, in the context of this considerable expansion and inspired by the financial practices of the Anglo-Saxon world, Lambert attempted what today is considered to be the first Belgian public takeover bid. The baron hired Compagnie Lambert pour l'Industrie et la Finance, of which his bank was the main shareholder, to make a public takeover bid against Sofina. However, against his expectations, Société Générale de Belgique declared a counter-takeover bid and succeeded in taking possession of Sofina.

Almost ten years later, in 1972, Compagnie Lambert pour l'Industrie et la Finance merged with two companies, Brufina and Cofinidus, to form Groupe Bruxelles Lambert. Shortly afterwards, in 1975, Banque Lambert merged with Banque de Bruxelles to form Banque Bruxelles Lambert (BBL), which then became the second largest Belgian bank. Alexandre Lamfalussy, negotiator for the Banque de Bruxelles, said he had "hesitated for a long time before embracing the Lambert name" as part of the new bank's name, mainly for fear of losing his Arab clientele. Indeed, Lambert financially supported many Israeli associations, which raised fears it could harm business with the Arab world, largely hostile to the State of Israel.

During the 1970s, the baron played a decidedly international role at a time when "multinational banking" had "gradually taken root in financial mores". Banque Lambert invests its capital in many foreign countries. In addition, the baron established two subsidiaries in the United States, the Brussels Lambert Company and the Drexel Burnham Lambert, a move hardly surprising considering his affinities with the United States, where he was notably a familiar presence on the New York homosexual scene. His intervention in the American stock market was crowned with success, but criticized by part of the Belgian press accusing him of turning away from Europe and Belgium.

=== Downfall ===
The last years of Lambert's career were less happy. Faced with the crisis of the 1980s and heavy indebtedness, the Bruxelles Lambert Group found itself short of liquidity, and consequently unable to pay its shareholders their dividends. In search of refinancing, the Brussels Lambert Group allowed Albert Frère join it; however, as relations between the two financiers deteriorated, Albert Frère ousted the baron from the group, who "gradually saw himself dispossessed of his jewels".

== Art collecting ==
Lambert had an extensive art collection. His collection included impressionist paintings, modern paintings, postwar paintings, prints, and sculptures. His collection included works by Alberto Giacometti, Auguste Rodin, Edgar Degas, Pierre Bonnard, René Magritte, and Paul Delvaux.

In 1970, Lambert co-founded Artemis Group International with David Carritt. Artemis was an international art investment trust and art holding company. Élie de Rothschild was a backer of it with Lambert.

After he retired, Lambert began selling off his art collection. Seventeen works of art sold for $6,344,000 at Christie's in May 1987.

After Lambert's death, millions of dollars' worth of art from his collection was scheduled for sale by Christie's.

The ING Belgium Collection is an art collection at ING Belgium that was started as a private collection by Lambert in the 1960s and evolved into a corporate collection in 1987. New additions to the collection have been added over time and the collection has around 2,500 works of art.

== Death ==
Lambert died of AIDS on 28 May 1987 in Brussels, Belgium. He died at Erasmus Hospital after going into cardiac arrest and lapsing into a coma. He was buried in the Dieweg cemetery in Uccle, Belgium before two ceremonies were organized in his honor in Brussels and New York. At the New York ceremony, Henry Kissinger and David Rockefeller delivered a eulogy, and gay rights activist Larry Kramer was also present.
