= Marion Lambert =

Marion Lambert

Baroness Marion Lambert (1943 – 28 May 2016) was a Swiss art collector, and the wife of Baron Philippe Lambert of the Bank Brussels Lambert banking dynasty. She was described as "one of the first collectors and patrons of contemporary photography".

== Early life ==
Marion Lambert was born Marion de Vries in 1943, into a prominent Swiss family of Dutch descent. She was raised in Geneva.

== Art collector ==
Lambert has been called "one of the first collectors and patrons of contemporary photography".

In a November 2004, she sold her entire collection of about 300 photographs mostly from the 1980s, entitled Veronica's Revenge, at Phillips de Pury in Chelsea, New York for a total of $9.2 million. Her original intention was for the collection to hang in the new headquarters of Bank Brussels Lambert in Geneva, but the directors found the works "simply too shocking". New records were set for works by Barbara Kruger, Charles Ray, Cindy Sherman, Mike Kelley, Richard Prince, and Louise Lawler.

From 3 to 14 October 2015, 306 objects from the Lambert Art Collection with estimates from £20 up to £3 million were on show at Ely House in Dover Street, and then auctioned by Christie's on 14 October 2015. Lambert and many of the objects in the auction appear in episode two of The Extraordinary Collector, presented by Gordon Watson.

== Personal life ==
In 1975, Marion married Baron Philippe Lambert, and they had two children together, a son, Henri Lambert, and Philippine Lambert, who died by suicide aged 20. Her suicide note and diaries accused a prominent family friend of sexual abuse.

The Lamberts lived in Geneva, Switzerland,

== Death ==
On 24 May 2016, she was hit by a bus driver on Route 73 near Bond Street tube station in London. She died from head injuries on 28 May 2016.
