= Groupe Bruxelles Lambert =

Belgian holding company

Groupe Bruxelles Lambert S.A.; Groep Brussel Lambert N.V.
- Company type: Naamloze vennootschap / Société anonyme
- Traded as: Euronext Brussels: GBLB; BEL 20 component
- Industry: Holding Company
- Founded: January 4, 1902
- Headquarters: Brussels, Belgium
- Key people: Ian Gallienne – Chairman of the Board of Directors Paul Desmarais, Jr. – Vice Chairman of the Board of Directors Johannes Huth – Managing Director
- Products: Listed, private and alternative investments
- Revenue: ▲€6.961 billion (fiscal year ended December 31, 2021)
- Operating income: ▲€0.523 billion (fiscal year ended December 31, 2021)
- Net income: ▲€0.434 billion (fiscal year ended December 31, 2021)
- Total assets: ▲€34.297 billion (fiscal year ended December 31, 2021)
- Total equity: ▲€21.788 billion (fiscal year ended December 31, 2021)
- Website: www.gbl.com/en

Groupe Bruxelles Lambert (GBL) is a Belgian holding company invested in multiple industries. It invests in both listed and private companies. GBL is chaired by Ian Gallienne and has Johannes Huth as Managing Director. GBL has a net asset value of €13.3 billion and a market capitalisation of approximately €10 billion at the end of March 2026. The total portfolio value amounts to €11.1 billion.

GBL relies on a stable and supportive family shareholder base, consisting of the Frère and Desmarais (Power Corporation of Canada) families. In 2021, Pargesa Holding merged with GBL and ceased to exist as a separate entity. Since 1990, the two groups have been bound by a shareholders' agreement. This agreement, which was extended in December 2012 until 2029, includes an extension possibility.

== History ==
The company now known as GBL was founded in 1972, when Léon Lambert's two holding companies, Compagnie Lambert pour l'Industrie et la Finance (CLIF) and Cofinter, merged with Brufina and Cofinindus, two holding entities associated with the so-called Groupe de Launoit founded by Paul de Launoit. The new company, called Compagnie Bruxelles Lambert pour la Finance et l'Industrie (CBLFI), held controlling stakes in two Belgian banks, Banque de Bruxelles and Banque Lambert, for which merger talks had been ongoing since 1969 and eventually came to fruition in 1975, creating the Bank Brussels Lambert (BBL). In August 1977, in turn, CBLFI was renamed Groupe Bruxelles Lambert.

In 1976, CBLFI restructured and built up various participations in U.S. financial firms, including Lambert Brussels Witter (formerly the research boutique William D. Witter), to form Drexel Burnham Lambert, in which it was the largest shareholder with a 26 percent equity stake. In 1982, GBL sold much of its stake in BBL, reducing it from 47 to 10 percent. BBL was eventually acquired by ING Group in 1998, becoming ING Belgium. In 1982-1983, financier Albert Frère displaced Léon Lambert as the main driving force of GBL;

Since 2012, GBL divested more and more its stakes in Total and Engie. These two companies in the energy sector that constituted 41.5% of the value of GBL in 2011, only represented 4.2% of the portfolio on 31 March 2017. Simultaneously, GBL expanded into new business segments by acquiring stakes in SGS, Umicore, Adidas, Ontex, Parques Reunidos.and Sienna Capital S.a R.l.

== Investments ==
Listed companies

On September 30, 2023, GBL owns significant holdings of the following companies (Ownership shares vary from 7%-55%):

- SGS - The world leader in testing, inspection, and certification ("TIC").
- Pernod Ricard - The world's second-largest wine and spirits seller.
- adidas - One of the largest manufacturers of athletic shoes and apparel globally.
- Imerys - A French multinational corporation specializing in the production and processing of industrial minerals.
- Concentrix + Webhelp - Global player in Customer Relationship Management and Business Process Outsourcing ("CRM–BPO").
- Ontex - A prominent global manufacturer specializing in personal hygiene products, offering premium items for Baby Care, Feminine Care, and Adult Care.

Private assets

On September 30, 2023, GBL is a major shareholder in the following companies:

- Affidea - Leading provider of advanced diagnostic imaging, outpatient and cancer care services in Europe.
- Sanoptis - European leader in ophthalmology services.
- Canyon - The world's largest direct-to-consumer manufacturer of premium bicycles, produces road bikes, mountain bikes, hybrid bikes, triathlon bikes, and e-bikes.
- Parques Reunidos - The second-largest leisure park operator in Europe and holds the largest individual portfolio of water parks globally.
- Voodoo - French mobile game developer and publisher.

GBL Capital (Alternative assets)

Established in 2013, GBL Capital invests in funds managed by asset managers and direct private equity co-investments. On September 30, 2023, the NAV of this activity represents 16% of GBL's portfolio.

Non-digital assets:

- Apheon
- Upfield
- Sagard
- Kartesia
- Carlyle
- C2 Capital
- Wella
- Mérieux Développement

Digital assets:

- Human Capital
- Backed
- Proalpha
- Stripes
- Illumio
- 468 Capital

Sienna Investment Managers (Third-party Asset Manager)

Sienna Investment Managers is a third-party asset manager that offers a range of investment strategies with a focus on long-term perspectives and environmental, social, and governance (ESG) considerations. As of June 2023, the assets under management totaled approximately EUR 30 billion.

With the support of GBL and its experience, Sienna Investment Managers aims to become a leading player in alternative third-party asset management across Europe. The firm specializes in various areas, including liquid assets, real estate, private credit, private equity, venture capital, and funds of funds.
