= Compagnie de Bruxelles =

Former Belgian insurance company

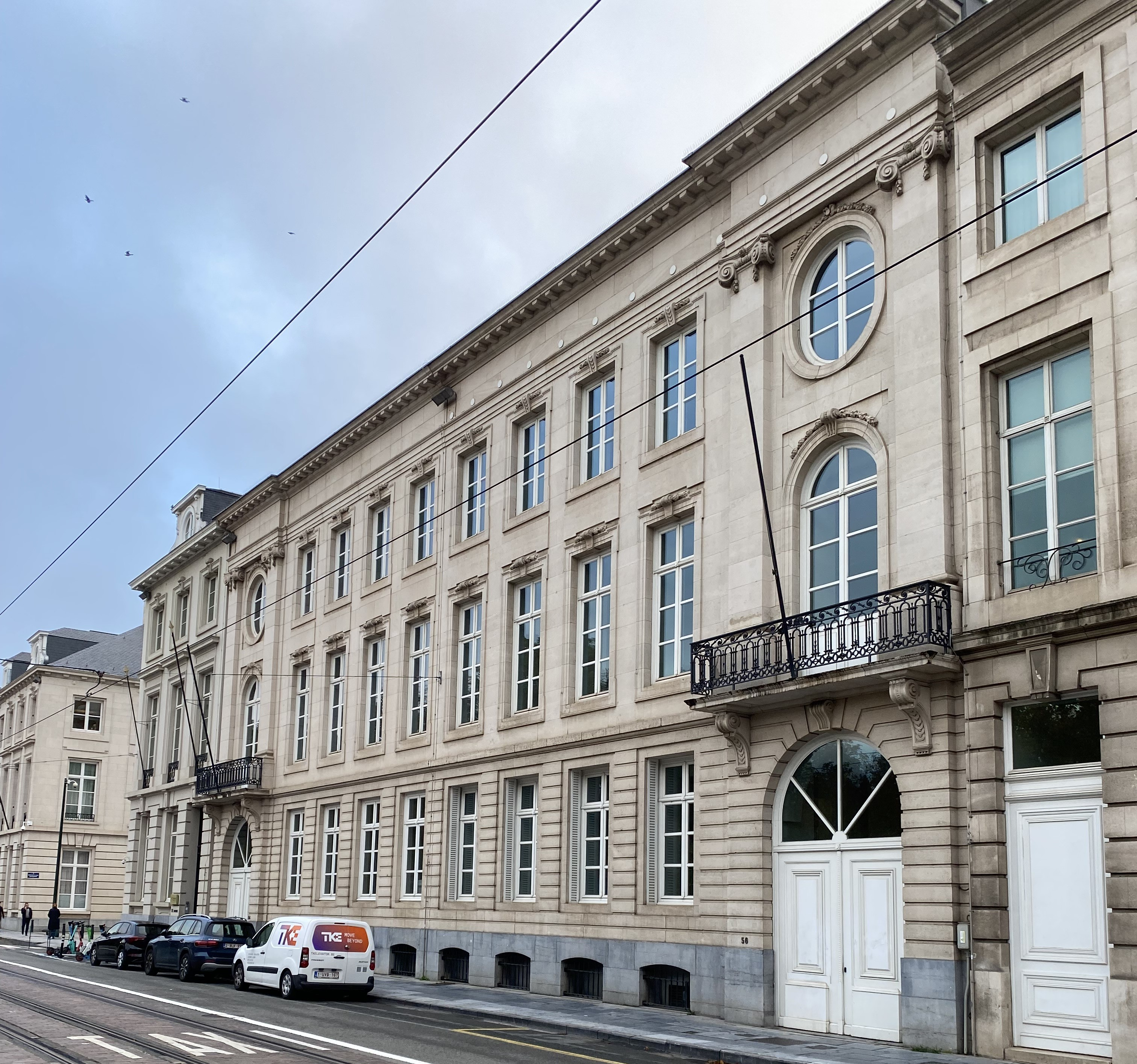
Former head office of the Compagnie de Bruxelles, Rue Royale 56

The Compagnie de Bruxelles (Dutch: Brusselse Maatschappij), full name Compagnie de Bruxelles pour l'Assurance à Primes Contre l'Incendie, la Foudre et les Explosions, was one of the first insurance companies in present-day Belgium. Founded in 1821 by Josse-Pierre Matthieu, one of the era's prominent merchants-financiers, it was later branded Compagnie de Bruxelles 1821, abbreviated as CB 1821. It was eventually absorbed by Fortis in 2000.

== Overview ==
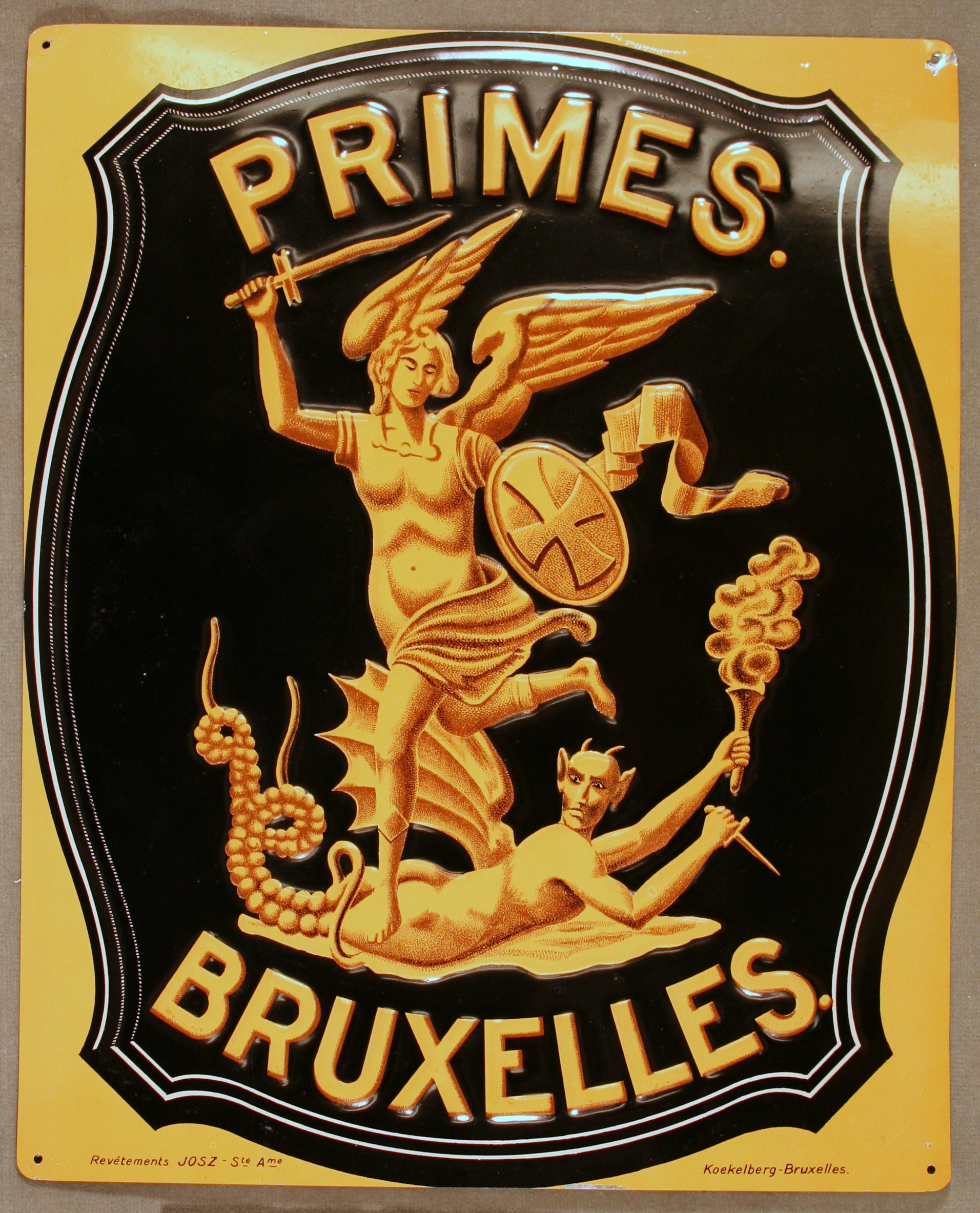
Fire insurance mark of the Compagnie de Bruxelles, kept at the Missouri History Museum

In late 1820, a massive fire at the Palace of the Nation, then known as the Palace of the Prince of Orange and of the States General, stimulated interest local interest in fire insurance. The Compagnie de Bruxelles was soon established on 15 February 1821 as a joint-stock company (French: société anonyme par actions). By decision of 15 July 1853, it was also authorized to operate in the Grand-Duchy of Luxembourg. Josse-Pierre Matthieu became the company's director in 1841, and the Matthieu family kept it under its control until 1972.

In 1857, Matthieu purchased the prestige building at present-day 54-56, rue Royale, where his family subsequently resided for over half a century. The Compagnie de Bruxelles was headquartered at No. 56 (numbered 46 in 1895 and 52 in the early 20th century, before final renumbering in the early 1920s), together with the family-run Banque Matthieu. In 1909–1910, that building was rebuilt on a design by architect René Théry. The Banque Matthieu was acquired by the Banque de Bruxelles in April 1928, but the Compagnie de Bruxelles remained in the building on rue Royale until at least the mid-1950s. By 1966, it had relocated to rue de la Loi 62, across the Small Ring of Brussels, in a new office building erected in 1963.

In 1972, the Matthieu family sold control of the Compagnie de Bruxelles to Eagle Star Insurance, which in turn sold it in 1991 to the Belgian public financial institution ASLK/CGER. It was subsequently privatized and acquired by AG Insurance in 1995, then merged into the Fortis brand in 2000. By then, its registered office was still at rue de la Loi 62, even though the building had been demolished during the 1990s.

The company's emblem, reproduced on its fire insurance marks, represented Michael the Archangel, patron saint of Brussels, slaying the dragon.

== See also ==
- Royale Belge
