= Nguyễn Quốc Y =

Vietnamese chef

- Born: Nguyễn Quốc Y 1966 (age 58–59); Quang Nam, Vietnam
- Occupation: Netspace Culinary Arts School
- Years active: 2010 -
- Website: https://thayy.vn

Nguyễn Quốc Y, also known as Master Y (born 1966) is a famous chef, vice president of the Vietnam Chef Association, the head of culinary training of the tourism training association of Vietnam. He is a graduate United Business Institutes (Belgium), he is the leader, researcher and expert training cuisine in Vietnam. He is also the founder of Netspace Culinary Arts School.
