= Gérald Frère =

Belgian businessman (born 1951)

- Born: 17 May 1951 (age 75); Charleroi, Belgium
- Occupation: Businessman
- Title: Chairman, Groupe Bruxelles Lambert
- Term: January 2012-
- Children: 2 sons
- Parent(s): Albert Frère; Nelly Poplimont

Gérald Frère (born 17 May 1951) is a Belgian billionaire businessman, the chairman of Groupe Bruxelles Lambert since January 2012, and its former CEO. As of August 2024, Forbes estimated his net worth at US$3.3 billion.

== Early life ==
Gérald Frère was born in Charleroi, Belgium on 17 May 1951.

He is the eldest son of Albert Frère and his first wife, Nelly Poplimont, and they had a son, Gerald.

== Career ==
Frère is the chairman of Loverval Finance, Groupe Bruxelles Lambert, Stichting Administratie Kantoor Bierlaire, Domaines Frère-Bougeois, and the vice chairman of Pargesa Holding.

Frère is the managing director of Financière de la Sambre, Frère-Bourgeois, and Pargesa Holding.

Albert Frère was regent at the National Bank of Belgium, but reached the age limit in 1995. Consequently, he did everything he could to get his son Gérald appointed to the regency, which - despite objections of nepotism - succeeded in 1998. Previously, Gérald Frère was already a censor at the National Bank. In April 2018, it became known that Gérald would be replaced in the regency by his son Cédric, an appointment that was widely criticized. After a year, the mandate of Cédric Frère in the regent council ended, which was not renewed because Minister of Finance Alexander De Croo (Open VLD) wanted the three vacant mandates to be filled by female regents, so that the party of Frères nomination, the MR, had to look for a female candidate.

He is a director of Power Financial, ERBE, Fonds Charles-Albert Frère, Haras de la Bierlaire, and Stichting Administratie Kantoor Frère-Bourgeois.

In April 2018, he was accused of nepotism for appointing his son Cédric as regent in the National Bank of Belgium.

== Private life ==
Frère has two sons, Cédric and William.

He lives at Gerpinnes.
