= Banque d'Outremer =

Former Belgian investment company

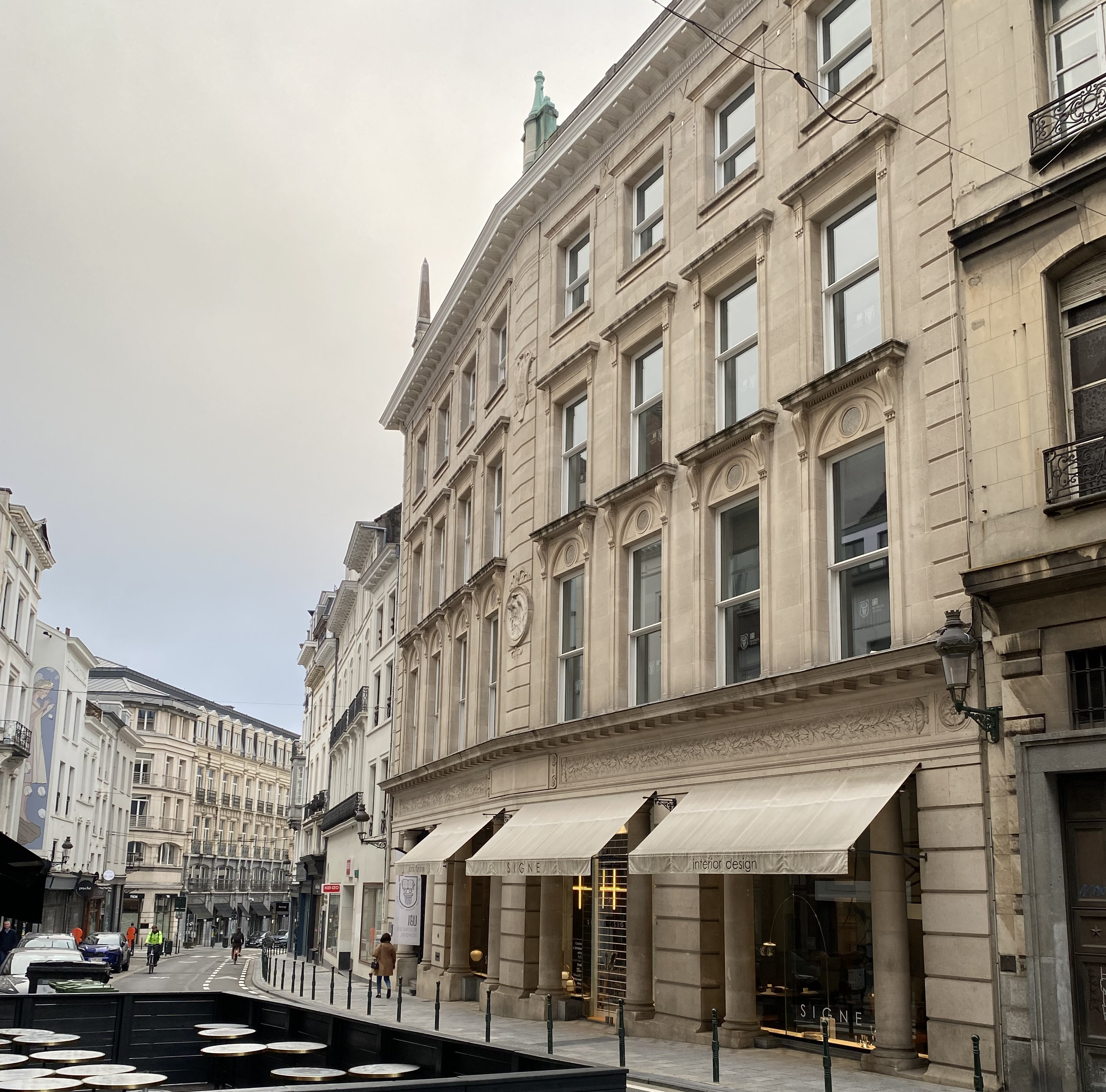
Former head office of the Banque d'Outremer, rue de Namur 48 in Brussels

The Banque d'Outremer (lit. 'Bank of Overseas'), initially known as the Compagnie Internationale pour le Commerce et l'Industrie (CICI, lit. 'International Company for Trade and Industry') was a Belgian financial institution, established in 1899 in the context of the exploitation of the Congo Free State, and eventually merged into the Société Générale de Belgique in 1928.

Despite being named as a bank, the Banque d'Outremer acted mostly as an investment company that invested in projects in Congo but also Canada, China, the Dutch East Indies, and Russia. For a decade from 1900 onwards, its activities in China were mainly channelled through an affiliate, the Compagnie Internationale d'Orient (lit. 'International Company of the East'), which it eventually absorbed in 1910.

== Overview ==
Following King Leopold II's creation of the Congo Free State in 1885, his colonial secretary Albert Thys in 1886 formed the Compagnie du Congo pour le Commerce et l'Industrie (CCCI) to exploit the territory's resources. On 7 January 1899, on Thys's initiative, the CICI was formed in Brussels; its founding shareholders were the Société Générale de Belgique (SGB, 14.5 percent), Banque Lambert (7.4 percent), Banque de Bruxelles (4 percent), as well as groups of French investors led by the Banque de Paris et des Pays-Bas, German investors led by Deutsche Bank, and British investors led by the Stern Brothers, Ernest Cassel, and Vincent Caillard. Because of frequent confusion between CCCI and CICI, the latter soon changed its name to Banque d'Outremer.

The chairman was initially the SGB's Joseph Devolder, while Thys was managing director. Thys subsequently took over the chairmanship in 1911, while Émile Francqui, who had led the Compagnie Internationale d'Orient in China in the 1900s, became managing director. Francqui only remained in that position until 1913, and was replaced by lawyer and financier Felicien Cattier. When Thys died unexpectedly in 1915, Francqui became chairman.

In 1909, the Banque d'Outremer was a founding shareholder of the Banque du Congo Belge.

Under the German occupation of Belgium during World War I, the Banque d'Outremer was placed under tight oversight of German commissioners, and underwent financial restructuring in 1916. In 1919, Francqui and Felicien Cattier fostered a strategic agreement between the Banque d'Outremer and the SGB that led to the departure of Albert Thys's son William, who went on to lead the Banque de Bruxelles.

By the mid-1920s, the Banque d'Outremer held significant equity stakes in the Banque du Congo Belge and its commercial banking affiliate the Banque Commerciale du Congo, the Banque Belge pour l'Étranger, the Bank of Flanders, and the Caisse Générale de Reports et de Dépôts, as well as numerous industrial, mining and infrastructure companies in multiple countries.

Under the supervision of Francqui and Felicien Cattier, the SGB eventually absorbed the Banque d'Outremer through an all-shares merger in February 1928, further cementing its dominant position in the economy of Belgium and of its African colonies.

== Head office ==
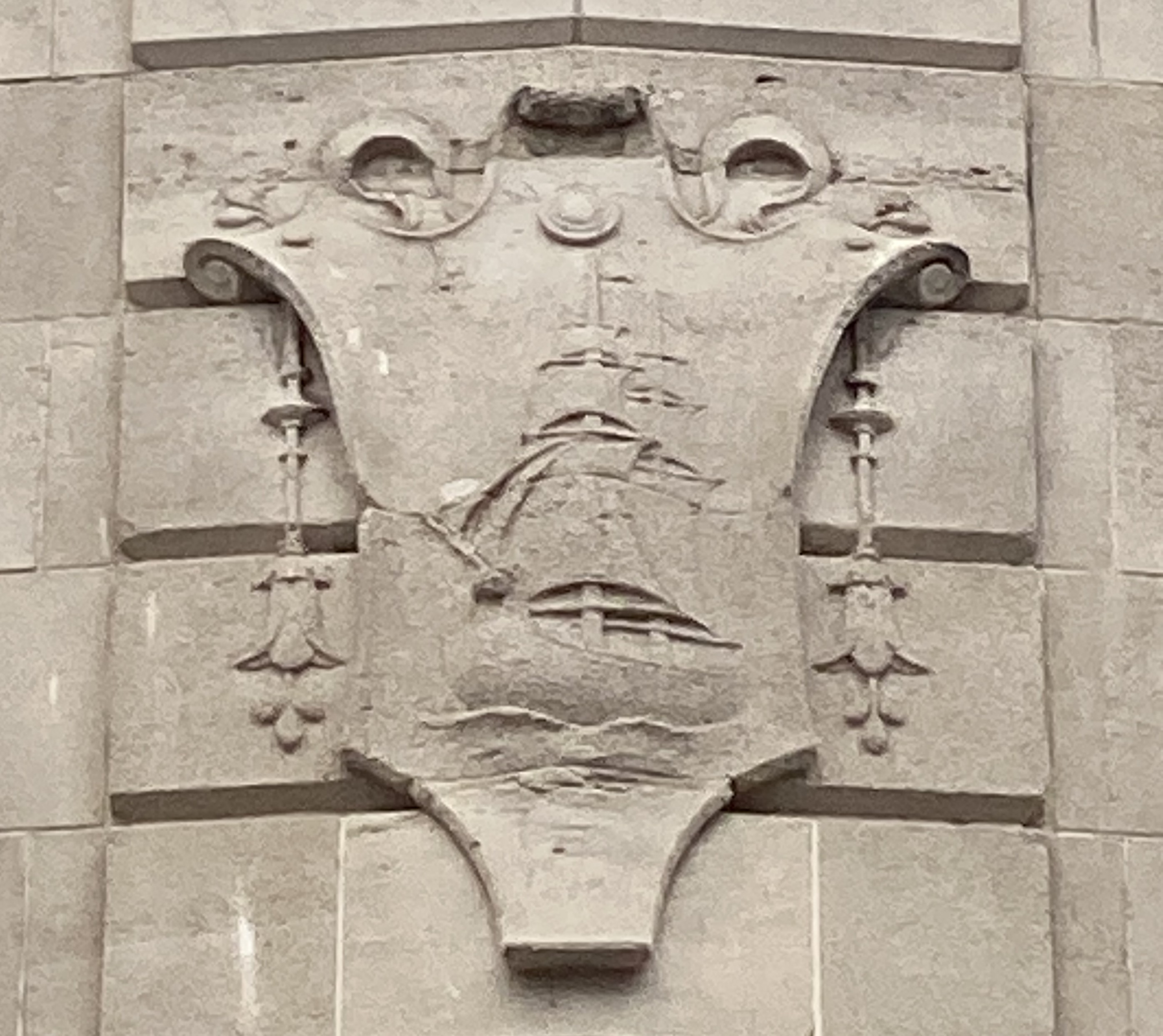
Detail of the head office on rue de Namur, depicting a ship symbolizing overseas (French: outremer) trade

The Banque d'Outremer was located on rue de Namur 48 in Brussels, in the same urban block as the CCCI, not far from the Royal Palace of Brussels and its annex the so-called Norwegian chalet that hosted the Free State's offices. The property was rebuilt on a 1916 design by architect Jules Brunfaut. By the late 2000s it was rented by the Belgian Federal Public Service Foreign Affairs. More recently it has become the Brussels Campus of United Business Institutes.

== See also ==
- Compagnie du Congo pour le Commerce et l'Industrie
- Banque du Congo Belge
