= Caisse Générale de Reports et de Dépôts =

Former Belgian bank

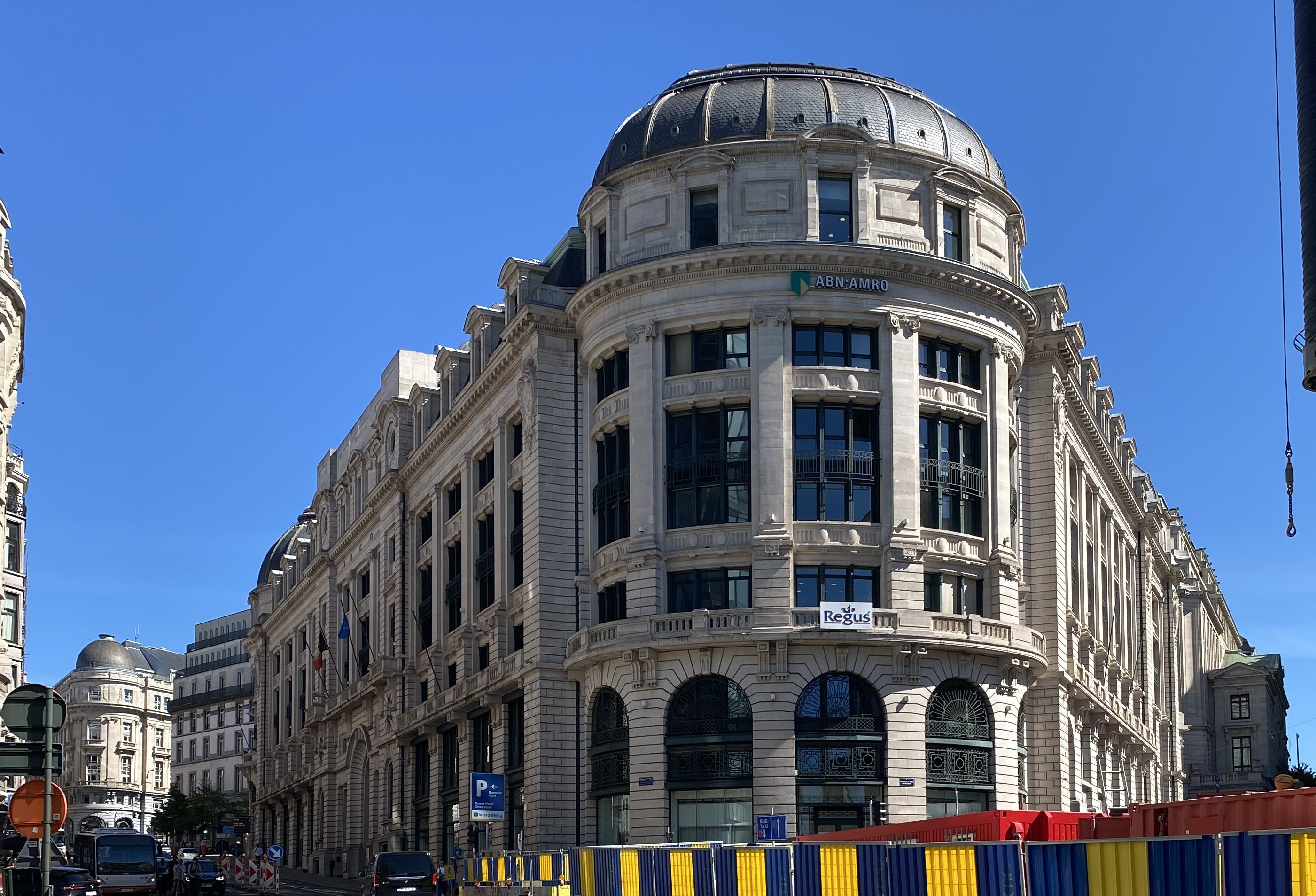
Former head office of the CGRD

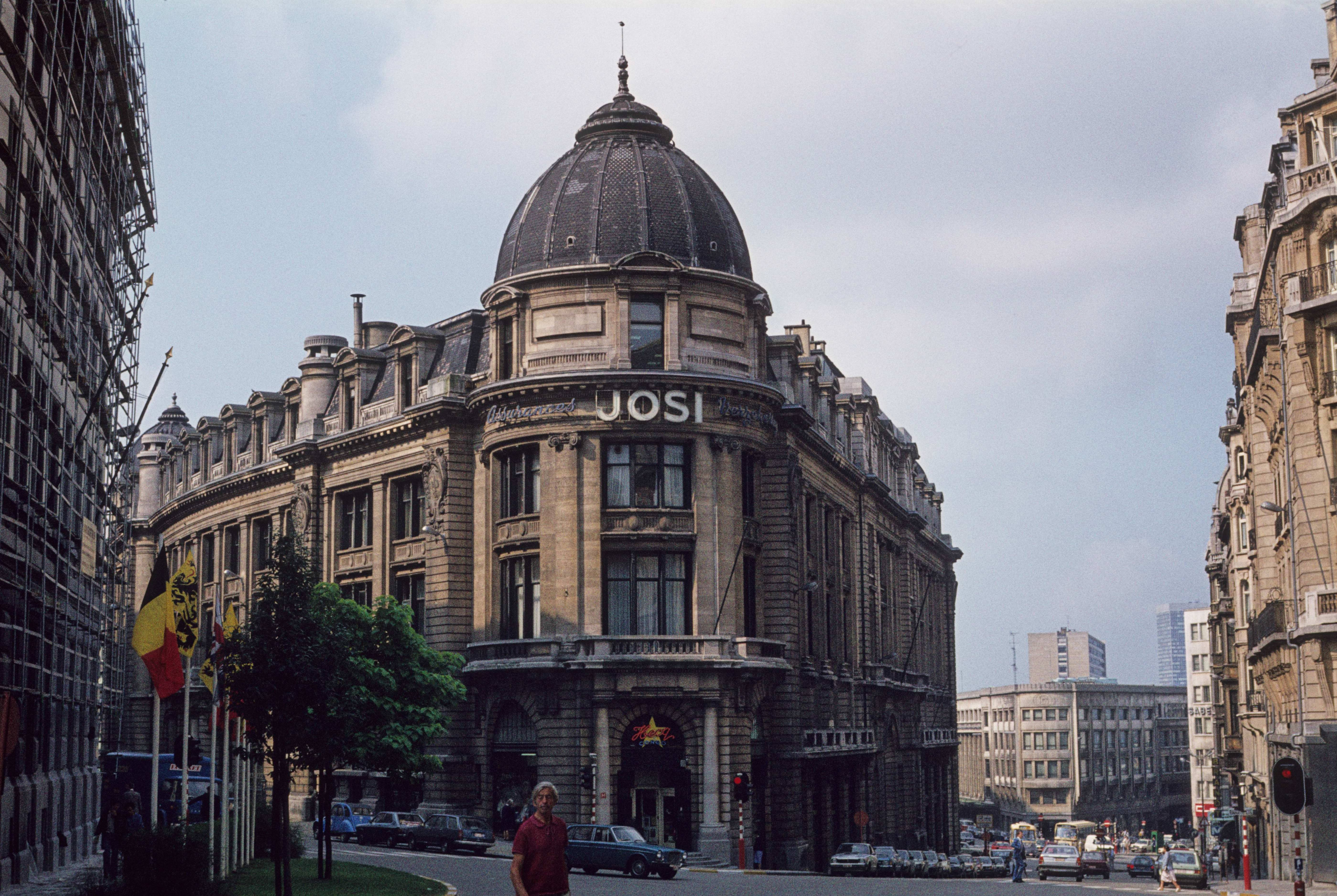
The CGRD building viewed from the north, photographed in 1982

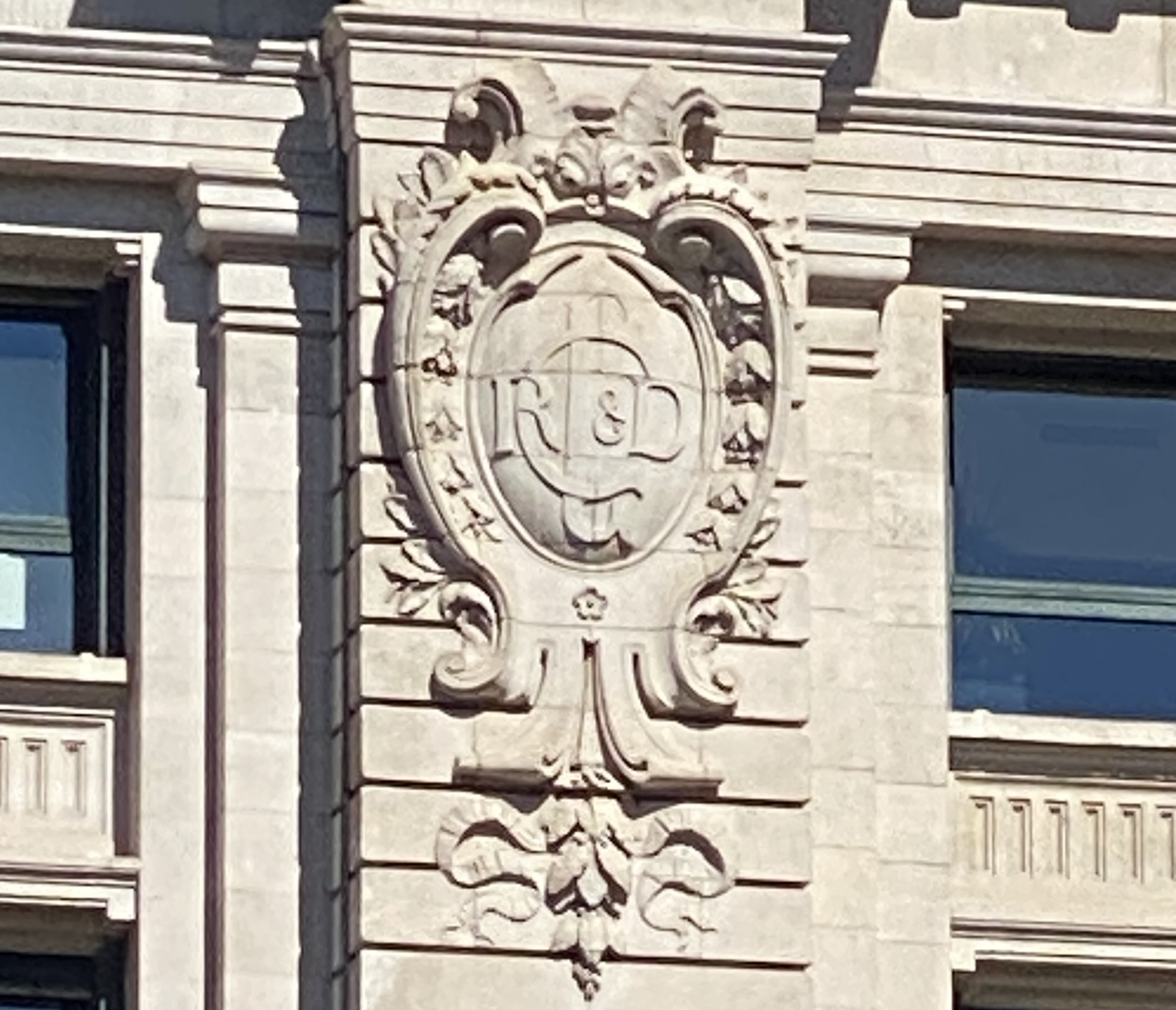
CGR&D monogram on the building

The Caisse Générale de Reports et de Dépôts (CGRD, sometimes CGR&D) was a bank headquartered in Brussels, Belgium. Founded in 1874, its business was reorganized in 1940 under the new name Banque de Reports et de Dépôts (BRD). It was eventually absorbed in 1953 by the Banque Lambert.

== Overview ==
The CGRD was established in 1874 and initially specialized in collateral loans to stockbrokers. (Reports refers to bank lending that enables leveraged securities trading.) In the early 20th century, the CGRD commissioned a prominent head office building in the downtown banking district of Brussels, designed by architect Paul Saintenoy and completed in 1911.

In 1935, Belgian banker Charles Fabri, a former general manager of the Banque d'Outremer, became the CGRD's controlling shareholder by acquiring an equity stake previously held by the Société Générale de Belgique as the latter spun off most of its banking operations as the Générale de Banque. In 1939, a year after Fabri's death, the bank fell into financial distress, in a context of generally adverse conditions in Belgium and specifically linked with the failure of the Amsterdam branch of Mendelssohn & Co., in which Fabri had made significant investments. Depositors were kept unharmed but the CGRD was liquidated In early 1940, while its business was transferred to a newly created entity, the Banque de Reports et de Dépôts. The new shareholders, namely the Société Générale de Belgique, Banque de Bruxelles, and Société Belge de Banque, together received 40 percent of the new entity's equity, while the former CGRD shareholders, including the Fabri family, retained 60 percent.

In 1947, the BRD created an affiliate in the Belgian Congo, the Société Congolaise de Banque.

In 1953, the investment company Cofinindus, controlled by Paul de Launoit and a shareholder of the Banque de Bruxelles, purchased the Fabri family’s equity stake of 33 percent in an attempt to acquire the BRD. That bid was thwarted by the Belgian authorities, however, out of competition policy concerns. Instead, the BRD was taken over by the Banque Lambert, providing a basis for the latter's dynamic expansion in subsequent years.

== See also ==
- Générale de Banque
- Kredietbank
- ASLK / CGER
- List of banks in Belgium
