= Rue Royale, Brussels =

Street in Brussels, Belgium

Rue Royale (French); Koningsstraat (Dutch)
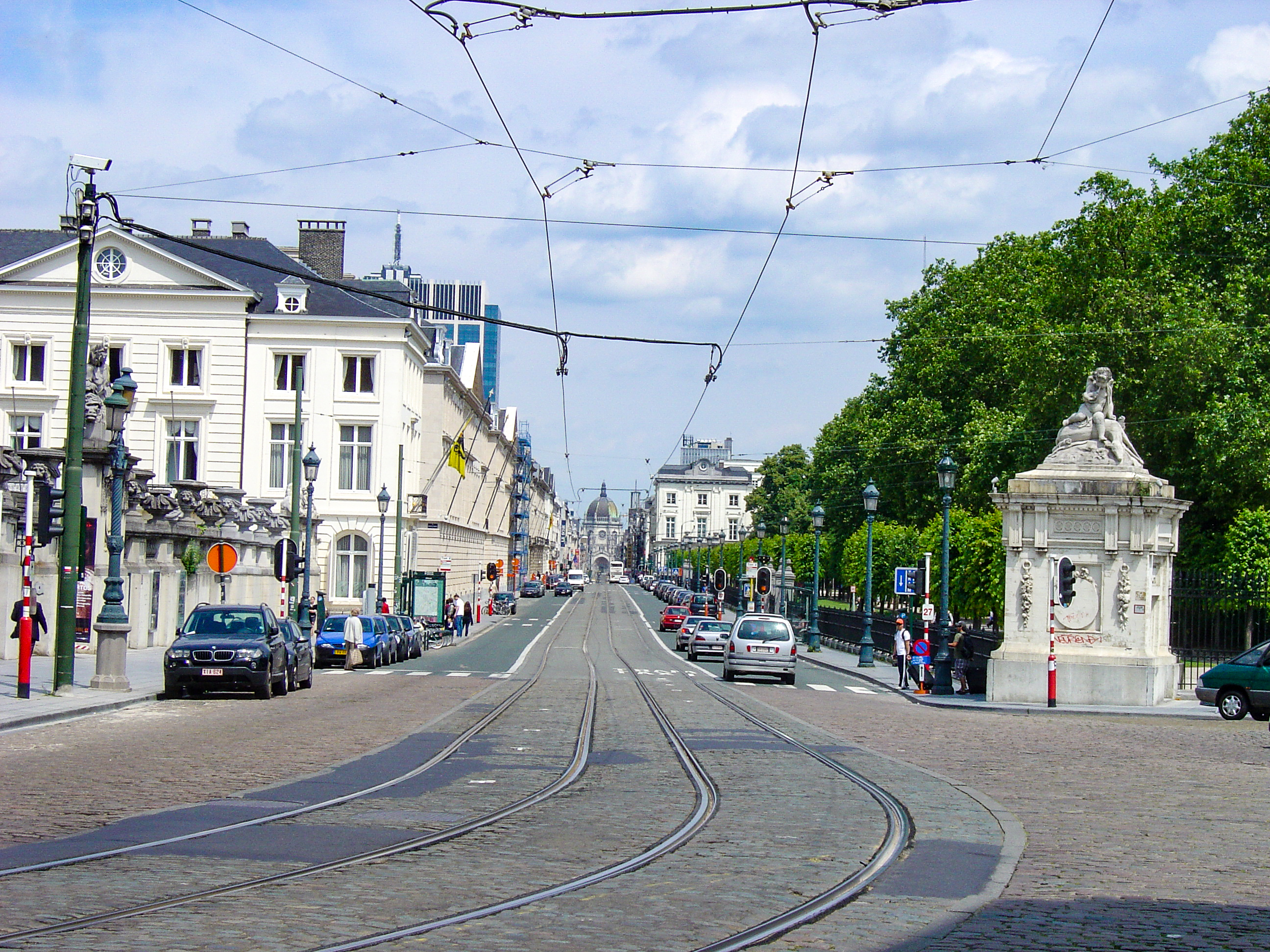
- A view along the Rue Royale/Koningsstraat with Saint Mary's Royal Church in the distance

- Location within Brussels Location within Belgium
- Type: Street
- Location: City of Brussels, Saint-Josse-ten-Noode and Schaerbeek, Brussels-Capital Region, Belgium
- Postal code: 1000, 1030, 1210
- Coordinates: 50°51′01″N 04°21′51″E

The Rue Royale (French, pronounced [ʁy ʁwajal]; "Royal Street") or Koningsstraat (Dutch, pronounced [ˈkoːnɪŋstraːt]; "King's Street") is a major street in Brussels, Belgium, running through the municipalities of Schaerbeek, Saint-Josse-ten-Noode and the City of Brussels. It is limited to the south by the Place Royale/Koningsplein in the city centre and to the north by the Place de la Reine/Koninginplein in Schaerbeek.

Several places of interest lie along the Rue Royale, for instance the BELvue Museum, Brussels Park, the Congress Column, the Hotel Astoria, the Botanical Garden of Brussels, Le Botanique concert hall and Saint Mary's Royal Church. In addition, many companies have offices on the street, for instance Accenture and BNP Paribas Fortis, as well as the French-speaking Community of Belgium.

Two metro stations can be accessed from the Rue Royale: Parc/Park (on lines 1 and 5) and Botanique/Kruidtuin (on lines 2 and 6). The street is continued to the north by the Rue Royale Sainte-Marie/Koninklijke Sinte-Mariastraat and to the south by the Rue de la Régence/Regentschapsstraat. It also crosses the Small Ring (Brussels' inner ring road) at the Boulevard du Jardin botanique/Kruidtuinlaan crossroad.

== History ==
The Rue Royale was laid out in 1777 between the Place Royale/Koningsplein and the Place de Louvain/Leuvenseplein, which required enormous levelling works. From 1822, the street was extended to the Schaerbeek Gate on the current Small Ring by the engineer Jean-Alexandre Werry and the architect Hendrik Partoes. Shortly afterwards, it was extended even further on the territory of Saint-Josse-ten-Noode to the newly constructed Place de la Reine/Koninginplein in Schaerbeek, where Saint Mary's Royal Church, whose groundbreaking took place in 1845, closes the kilometre-long perspective.

In November 1902, King Leopold II was attacked by the Italian anarchist Gennaro Rubino on the Rue Royale and escaped death. However, his Grand Marshall, Count Charles d'Oultremont, was almost killed.

== Buildings ==
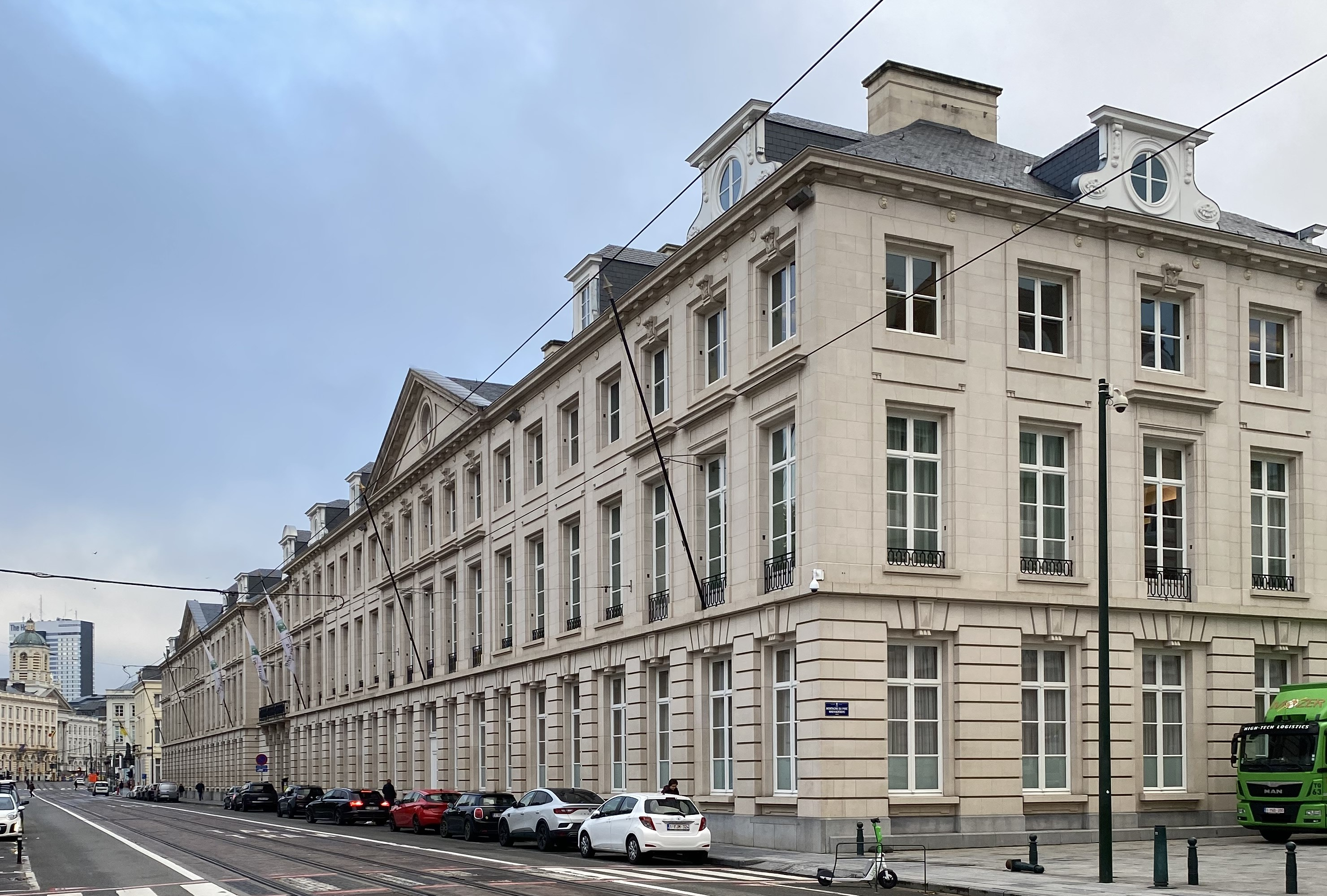
Rue Royale 20–30–40 (formerly 16–50) as rebuilt around 1970 for the Société Générale de Belgique, lately part of the head office complex of BNP Paribas Fortis

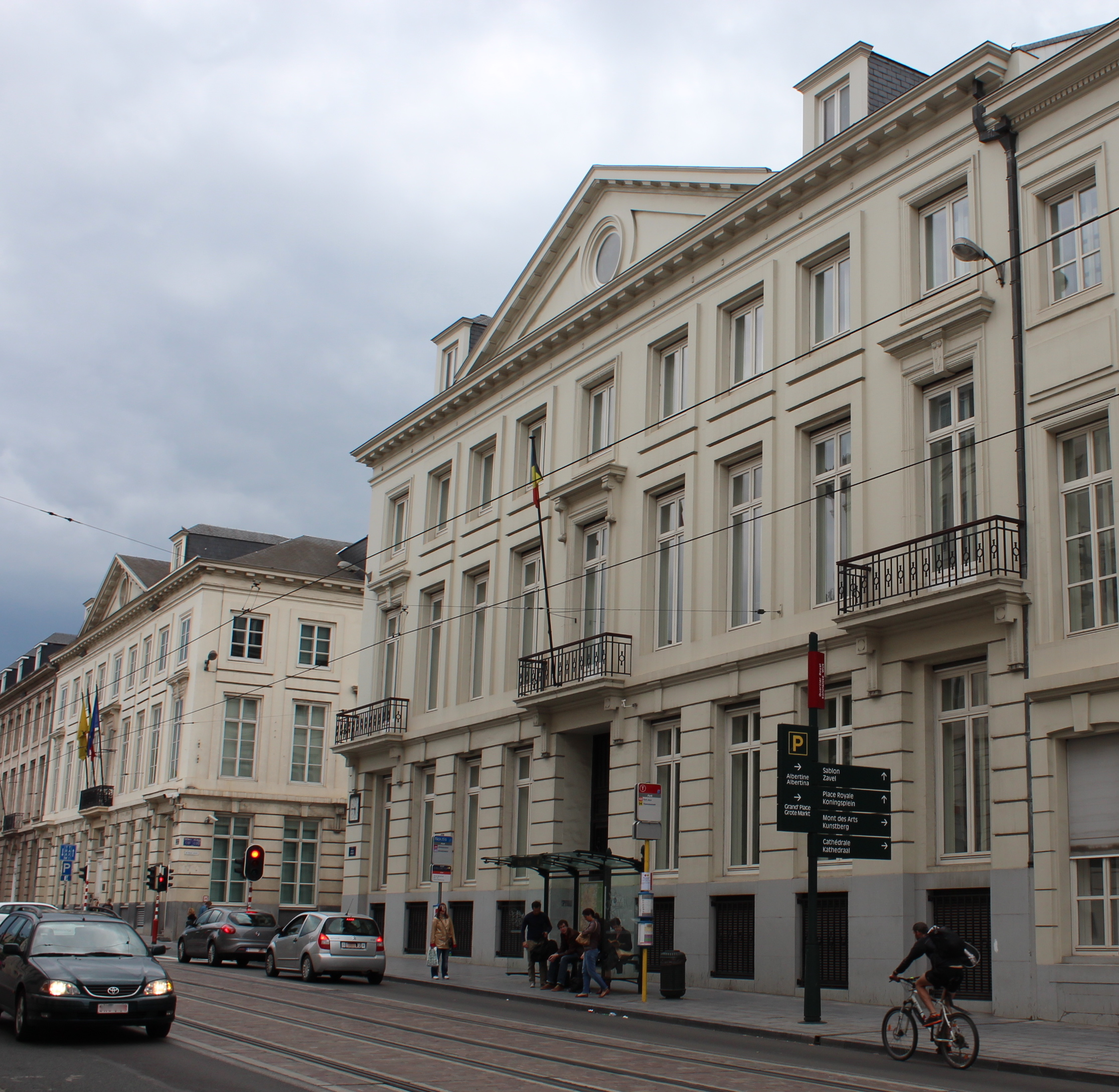
Rue Royale 70–72 (left) and 74–76 (right), now respective seats of the Parliament of the French Community and of the Brussels Intercommunal Transport Company (STIB/MIVB)

The Rue Royale developed as the prime address for the Belgian corporate world and especially its financial industry. For example, in 1921, just after its latest renumbering (i.e. with the same street numbers as now), the following companies were headquartered there. On the western side, including the prestige stretch facing Brussels Park:

- No. 2-4 (Hôtel de Grimbergen): British Bank for Foreign Trade, Brussels branch
- No. 12-14 (Hôtel Errera): Errera family of bankers and lawyers, including the founder of the Bank of Brussels
- No. 36: Société Générale de Belgique (SGB), Belgium's leading financial conglomerate of the era, which actually occupied much of the block including its historical head office downhill at 1–3, rue Montagne du Parc/Warandeberg.
- No. 44: Compagnie Générale de Chemins de Fer et de Tramways en Chine, part of the Empain Group
- No. 48: Société Belge de Chemins de Fer en Chine, affiliate of the SGB
- No. 50: Union Minière du Haut-Katanga, also connected with the SGB
- No. 52: Banque des Colonies, controlled by the colonial entrepreneur Adrien Hallet
- No. 56: Banque Matthieu and Compagnie de Bruxelles, controlled by the Matthieu family which lived at nearby no. 54, as well as the Brussels office of Lloyds and National Provincial Foreign Bank
- No. 60: Cercle de l'Union, a prestigious social club whose membership included notable business leaders
- No. 64: Société Belge de Crédit Industriel et Commercial et de Dépôts, Belgian subsidiary of the Paris-based Crédit Industriel et Commercial
- No. 66: Bank of Brussels, Belgium's second-leading bank at the time behind the SGB
- No. 68: Crédit Général Liégeois, Brussels branch
- No. 70–72 (Hôtel de Ligne): Société Française de Banque et de Dépôts, Belgian subsidiary of the Paris-based Société Générale
- No. 74: Banque de Commerce, Brussels branch
- No. 78: Crédit Lyonnais, Belgian subsidiary
- No. 114–116: London County Westminster and Parr's Bank, Brussels office
- No. 124: Le Soir newspaper
- Place du Congrès 1: Banque Auxiliaire Franco-Belge
- Place du Congrès 2: Banque Transatlantique Belge, soon replaced after bankruptcy by the Huileries du Congo Belge with entrance at Rue Royale 150
- No. 156: Guaranty Trust Company of New York, Brussels office
- No. 158: Société Générale Belge d'Entreprises Électriques and multiple affiliated ventures
- No. 194: La Bâloise, Brussels office
- No. 224: Royal Exchange Assurance Corporation, Brussels office

And on the eastern side, all to the north of the Rue de Louvain/Leuvenseweg:

- No. 11: Mutual Life Insurance Company of New York, Brussels office
- No. 29–31: La Nationale de Paris insurance company, Brussels office
- No. 39: American Foreign Banking Corporation, a joint venture led by the Chase National Bank
- No. 43–45: Compagnie Industrielle du Levant (est. 1902 in Smyrna), Brussels office
- No. 67–71: Banque Commerciale de Belgique
- No. 81: Banque Coloniale de Belgique
- No. 89: Crédit National de Belgique
- No. 99: several Belgo-Egyptian ventures including Brasseries d'Egypte, Ciments d'Egypte and Tramways d'Alexandrie
- No. 103: Hotel Astoria
- No. 143: Compagnie Centrale de l'Industrie Electrique and overseas electricity utilities in Brăila, Kaunas, Petrograd, Salerno and Sofia

Later on, many of the properties on the most prestigious park-facing stretch were absorbed by the SGB, which redeveloped them as offices for itself and its numerous affiliated companies. Thus, nos. 16–50 were consolidated and reconstructed in the late 1960s into a single building hosting the SGB's head office, and nos. 52–68 were later similarly redeveloped by the SGB's successor, Fortis Group, in 2008–2012 as part of a broader project branded Chancellerie/Kanselarij.

== Gallery ==
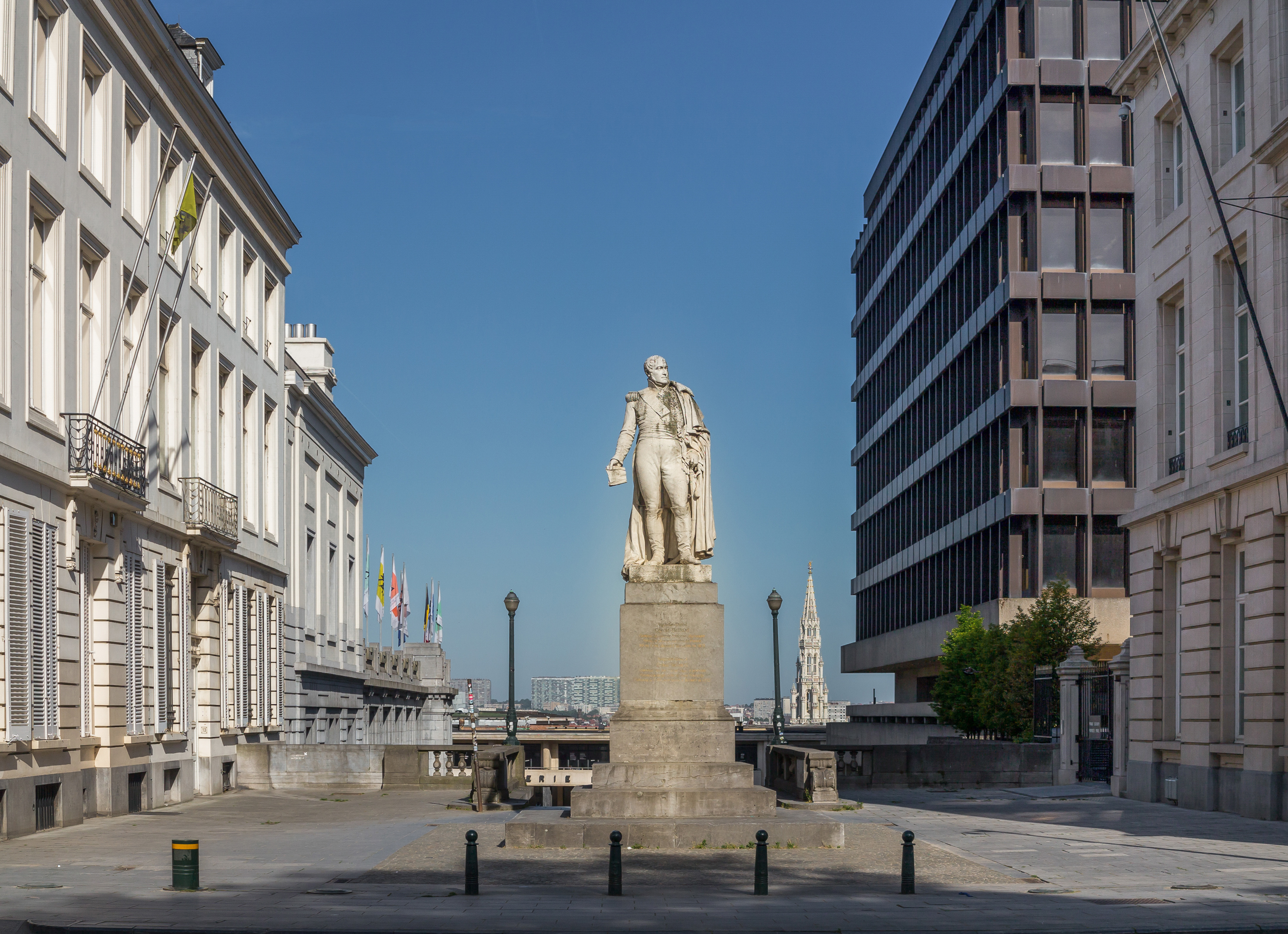
Statue of Augustin Daniel Belliard (Geefs, 1836)

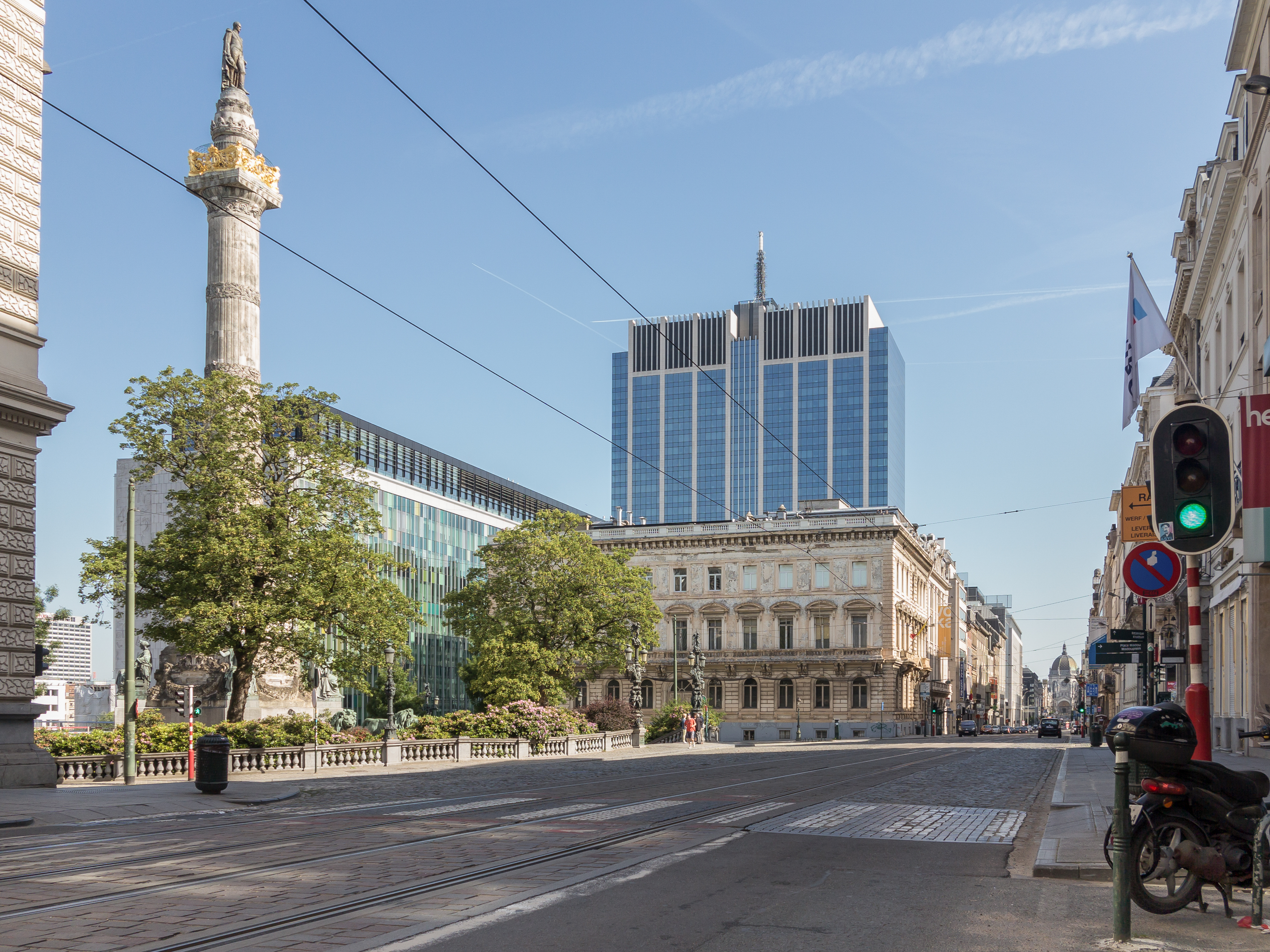
Congress Column (Poelaert, 1859) and Finance Tower (Van Kuyck, Lambrichs and Stynen, 1982)

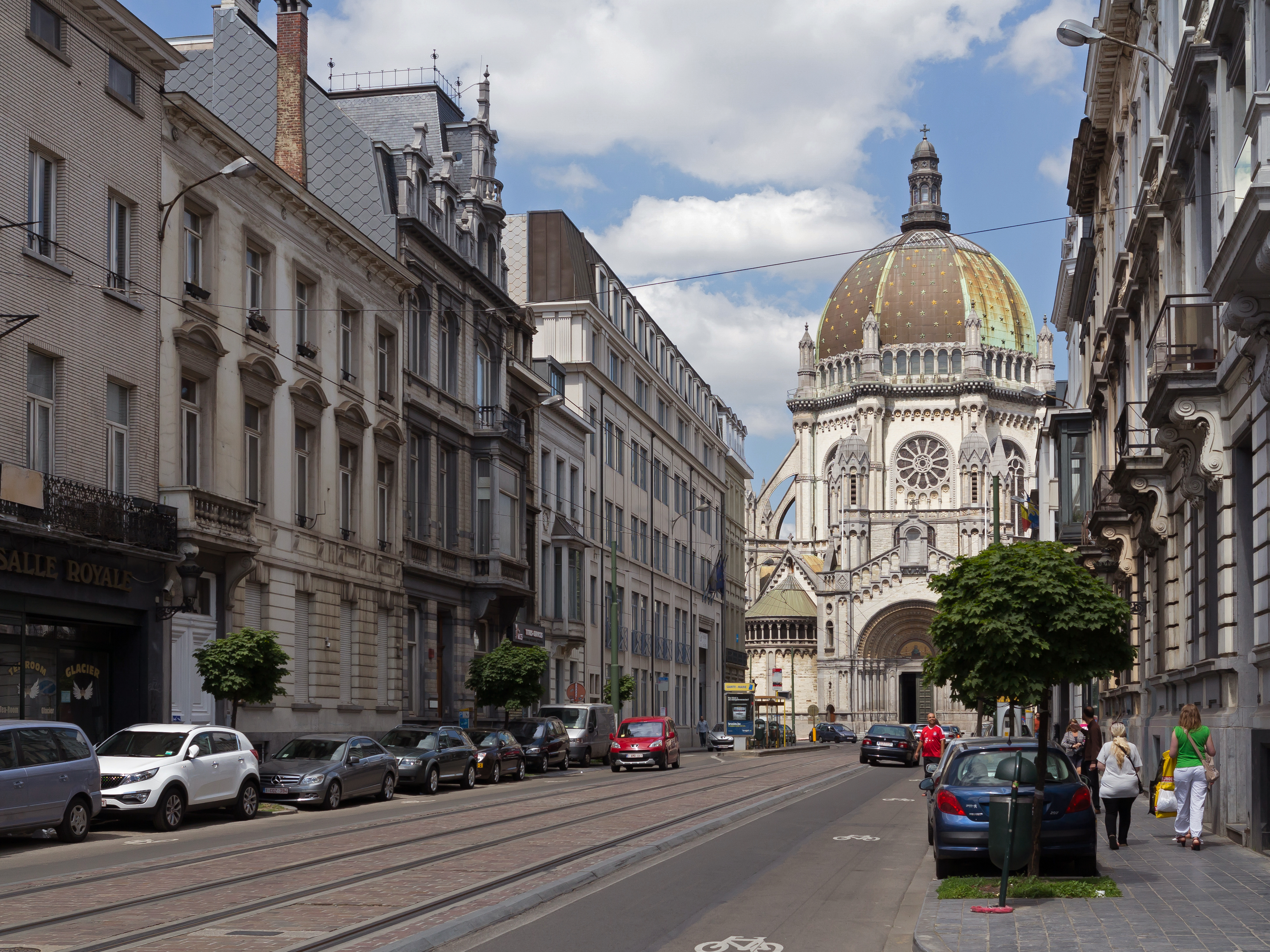
Saint Mary's Royal Church (Van Overstraeten, Roelandt and Hansotte, 1888)

== See also ==
- List of streets in Brussels
- Neoclassical architecture in Belgium
- History of Brussels
- Belgium in the long nineteenth century
