= Banque Matthieu =

Former private bank in Brussels

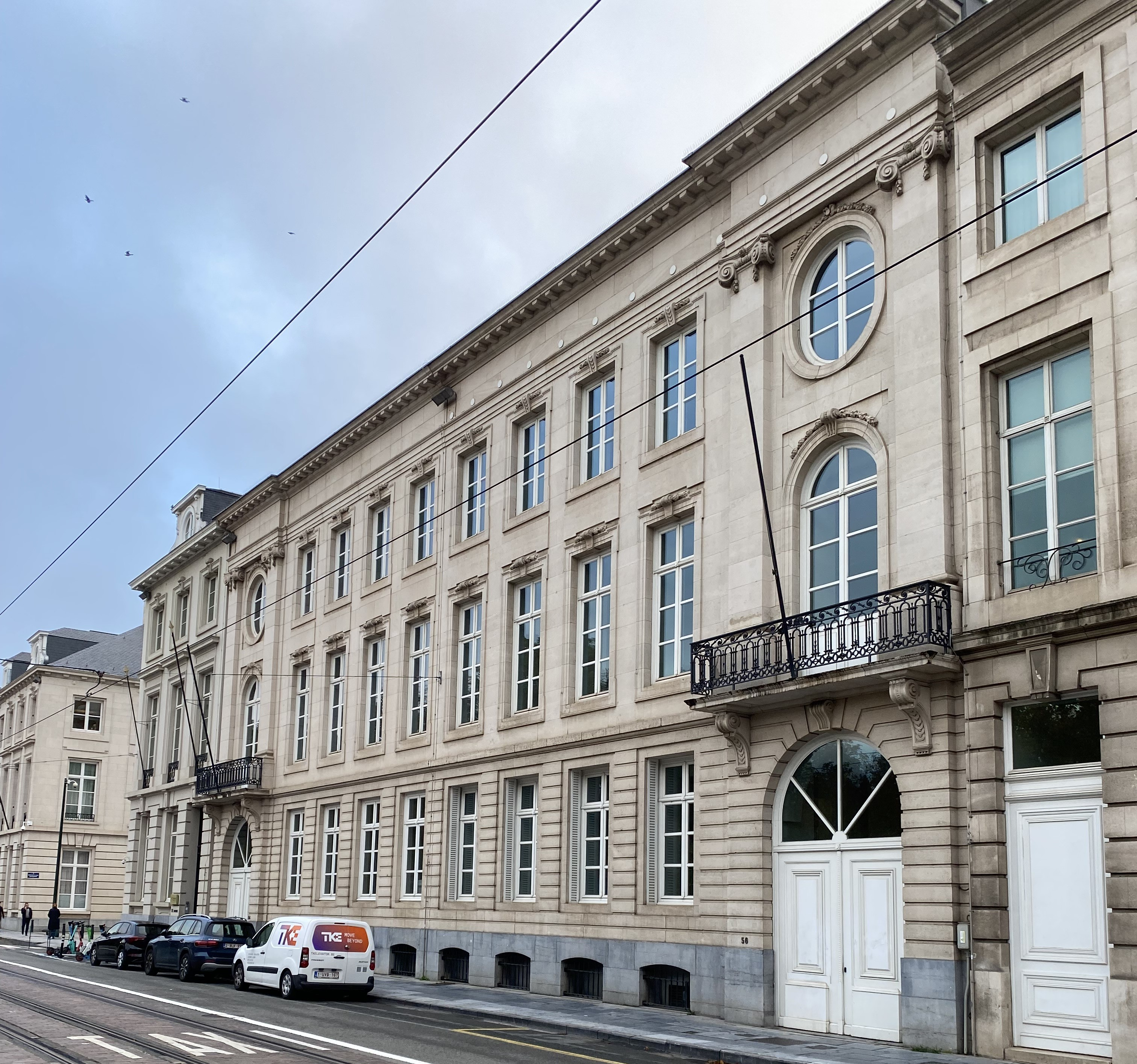
Former Matthieu family mansion and head office of Banque Matthieu, rue Royale 54-56

The Banque Matthieu was a private bank in Brussels, originally established in 1754 by the Matthieu family of local merchants. In the late 19th and early 20th centuries, it was known as Banque J. Matthieu & fils. It was eventually acquired in April 1928 by the Bank of Brussels.

== Overview ==
The Matthieu banking dynasty was founded by Henri Matthieu (ca. 1700-1771) and his son Abraham-Mathias Matthieu (1725-?), with indication of 1754 as starting point of their banking business. Abraham's son Henri-Georges-Géry Matthieu (1756-1818) was a merchant and churchwarden (French: marguiller) of Notre-Dame aux Riches Claires in central Brussels.

The Matthieu family reached prominence in the 1820s under the newly established kingdom of the Netherlands, when Josse-Pierre Matthieu (1784-1863), second son of Henri, was among the cofounders first of the Compagnie de Bruxelles in 1821, then of the Société Générale de Belgique in 1822. He lived in a mansion on rue d'Anderlecht, on the location of present-day Parc Simone de Beauvoir. In 1832, his elder brother Abraham (Abraham-Mathieu-Joseph Matthieu, born in 1782) purchased 107 hectares of the Sonian Forest around Watermael-Boitsfort from the Société Générale. In 1833, after the Belgian Revolution, Josse-Pierre Matthieu purchased Wijnendale Castle, a fabled historical property in West Flanders. In 1841, he became director of the Compagnie de Bruxelles.

After the financial crisis of 1848, Josse-Pierre Matthieu further rose to notability as one of the forty-odd group that together controlled the Société Générale, by then a dominant player in the Belgian economy, of which he became successively treasurer and director. From 1850 to 1853, he was also a director of the newly established National Bank of Belgium, from which he eventually resigned given the conflict of interest with the Société Générale. He simultaneously developed the family bank in partnership with his brother-in-law Gustave Moeremans.

In 1857, the family relocated to a prestige building at rue Royale 54-56 (present-day numbering since the early 1920s), in which both the family bank and the Compagnie de Bruxelles subsequently held their operations.

Josse-Pierre's son Jules-Joseph-Louis Matthieu (1822-1894) succeeded his father as director of the Société Générale de Belgique from 1864 to his own death, and was also a director at the Compagnie de Bruxelles and at another insurance company, the Nationale Belge, Société anonyme d'assurances et de réassurances à primes fixes (est. 1858). He further developed the family bank, which became known as Banque Jules Matthieu & Fils, as Jules's son Josse-Jean-Jules Matthieu (1859-1922) helped run it in the later 19th century before succeeding his father as principal. In 1909-1910, Josse Matthieu led the reconstruction of the northern half of the family mansion on rue Royale for use as offices of the Banque Matthieu and of the Compagnie de Bruxelles, with a new stone façade replicating the original late-18th century design. As the family still lived in the mansion's southern half, the entire property was still associated with the Banque Matthieu in the late 1910s.

After Josse Matthieu passed away in 1922, his son Jacques (1899-1980) eventually sold the Banque Matthieu to the Banque de Bruxelles in 1928, at a time of consolidation of the Belgian banking sector, and departed the mansion at rue Royale 54, which was subsequently used by various companies. The Matthieu family relocated to Wijnendale Castle, where king Leopold III held the fateful Wijnendale meeting during the German invasion on 25 May 1940, and was later ennobled by Leopold's successor Baudouin of Belgium in 1957 as Matthieu de Wynendaele, a name it has kept since then.

== See also ==
- Banque Lambert
- List of banks in Belgium
