= Banque Lambert =

Former Belgian bank

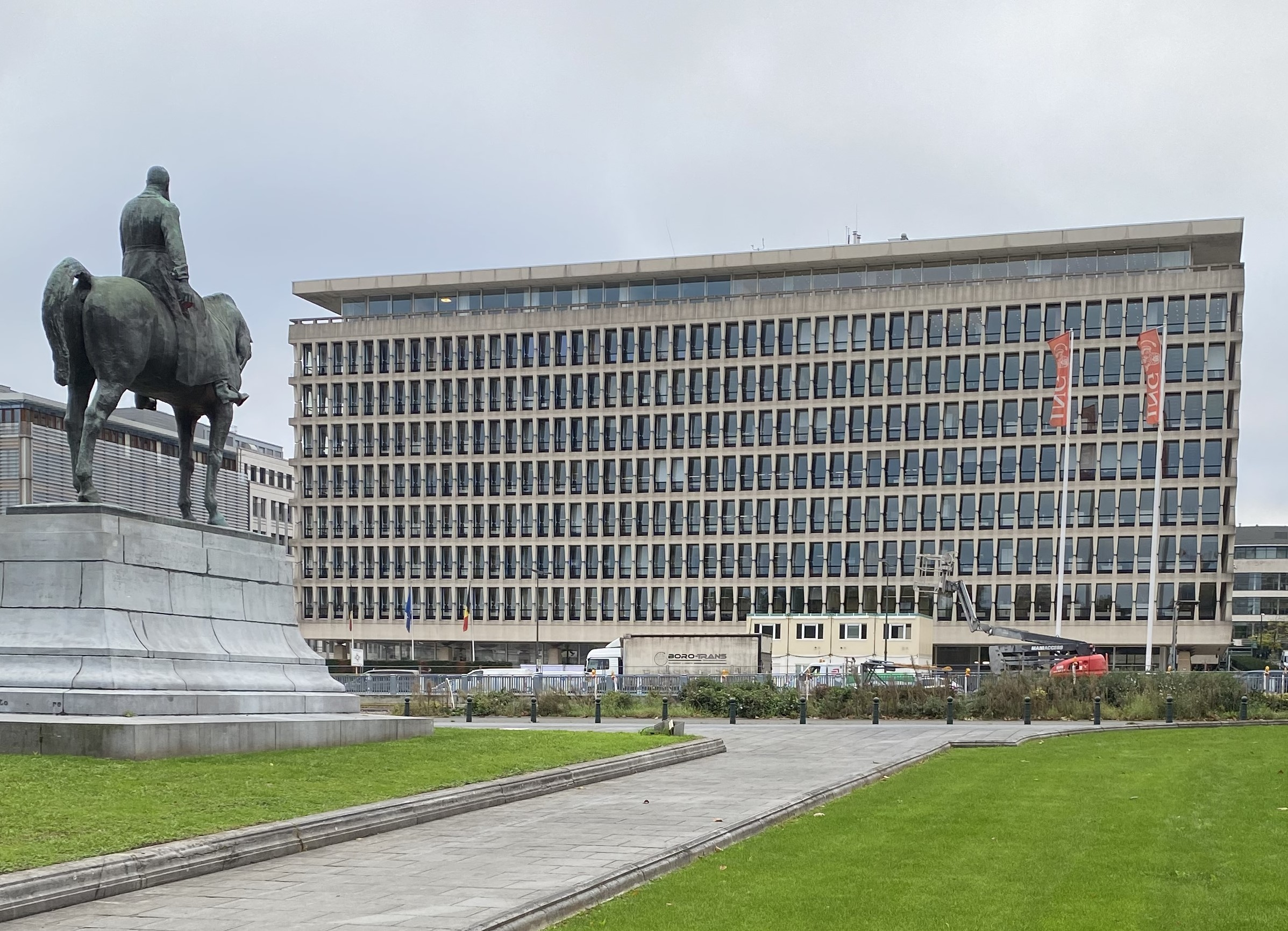
- Former head office building of Banque Lambert in Brussels, completed in 1965
- Type: Private company
- Industry: Financial services
- Founded: 1835; 191 years ago
- Founders: Lazare Richtenberger
- Defunct: 1975; 51 years ago
- Fate: Merged
- Successor: Banque Bruxelles Lambert
- Headquarters: Brussels, Belgium
- Products: Banking services, investment banking
- Owner: Lambert family

The Banque Lambert (French pronunciation: [bɑ̃k lɑ̃bɛʁ]) was a significant family-controlled bank in Belgium, with roots going back to 1835 and long associated with the Rothschilds. It merged in 1975 with the Bank of Brussels to form Bank Brussels Lambert, which itself was acquired in 1998 by ING Group.

== 19th century ==
In 1835, Aschaffenburg-born banker Lazare Richtenberger initiated business in Brussels, in the recently created Kingdom of Belgium, as agent of James Mayer de Rothschild under the name Richtenberger, agent Rothschild. In 1838 Richtenberger married Charlotte née Neymer, widow Low Levy. Her son-in-law, Lyon-born Samuel Lambert, moved to Brussels and partnered with Richtenberger, upon which the business became Lambert-Richtenberger, agent Rothschild. In the early 1840s, Lambert moved to Antwerp. Following Richtenberger's death in late 1853, the business took the name of Lambert, agent Rothschild, and relocated its main activity from Antwerp to Brussels while Antwerp remained as a branch.

Samuel's son Léon Lambert took over the bank's leadership upon Samuel's death in 1875. In 1882 he married Zoé Lucie Betty de Rothschild, a granddaughter of James de Rothschild, further reinforcing the links between the two families. A prominent member of the Belgian establishment and royal court, he was at times second among all the country's taxpayers, surpassed only by Prince Philippe, Count of Flanders. He was main banker to King Leopold II, both in a personal capacity and for the Congo Free State, which earned him the nickname of "le banquier du roi".

Léon Lambert and his bank also played a critical role in the financing and implementation of Leopold II's projects for the urban transformation of Brussels. In 1876, they helped the king remodel the surroundings of the Palace of Laeken, and later on the creation of the (by then) leafy avenues of the Small Ring, the latter together with bankers Victor Allard and Georges Brugmann. In 1886, the bank purchased the land for the creation of the monumental Avenue de Tervuren.

The Banque Lambert was instrumental in financing the Belgian participation in colonization of the Congo Basin. In 1899, it sponsored the establishment of the Banque d'Outremer led by Albert Thys, and was its second-largest founding shareholder next to the Société Générale de Belgique.

== 20th century ==
Léon's son Henri Lambert in turn took the bank's reins after his father died in 1919. As Henri's relationship with the Rothschilds was less close than his father's, the bank evolved from a Rothschild agent to a correspondent relationship, and in 1926 it was reorganized as a joint-stock company, Banque H. Lambert, in which Henri Lambert held the majority of the equity. After Henri Lambert died in 1933, his widow Johanna (Hansi) von Reininghaus maintained the bank in activity but on a gradually reduced business footprint. In 1934, new Belgian banking legislation forced a separation of the bank's equity investments into a separate entity, the Mutuelle Lambert. During the dark years of German occupation of Belgium during World War II Hansi and her teenage son, named Léon like his grandfather and born in 1928, lived in Switzerland then in the United States. Following the war's end, the bank was again reorganized in 1946 into a partnership (French: société en commandite simple) as Banque H. Lambert (de Lhoneux, De Bruyn et Cie), with reference to its then partners Guy de Lhoneux and Paul De Bruyn. By then it had shrunk to just ten employees.

The young Léon Lambert became chairman of the Mutuelle Lambert in July 1949 upon his 21st birthday, and partner of the Banque H. Lambert (de Lhoneux, De Bruyn et Cie) in December 1950, at which point the bank was finally rebranded as Banque Lambert. Léon Lambert convinced a number of talented individuals to join the bank and develop it. In September 1951, Camille Gutt, after completing his term as first Managing Director of the International Monetary Fund, joined the bank as partner, and played a major role in mentoring Léon Lambert until his retirement in late 1964. In 1953, Jacques Thierry, whose mother was from the Rothschild family, joined and became Lambert's deputy in the 1960s. In 1960, Jean Godeaux, who had also worked at the IMF between 1949 and 1955, joined the bank and later became its chairman until being appointed to the Belgian Banking Commission (French: Commission bancaire) in 1974.

Throughout the 1950s and 1960s, Léon Lambert involved the bank in multiple transactions and feats of financial engineering in Belgium and abroad. He moved the family holding company which held a majority stake in the bank, renamed the Mutuelle pour le développement économique et financier, to Vaduz in Liechtenstein. In 1951, the bank established a Canadian subsidiary, Belgian Overseas Corporations Ltd, and soon afterwards the Amsterdam Overseas Corporations in New York. In 1953, it took over the much larger Brussels-based Banque de Reports et de Dépôts. In 1961, the Banque Lambert fostered the creation of the Geneva-based Société financière pour les pays d'outre-mer (SFOM) with the aim of pooling its shareholders' investments in Africa; together with Banque Lambert, SFOM's founders included France's Banque Nationale pour le Commerce et l'Industrie and its African subsidiary BNCI-Afrique, California-based Bank of America, and Milan-based Banca d'America e d'Italia, which in 1964 were joined by Germany's Commerzbank. This allowed Banque Lambert to diversify the risk it held through its ownership of the Société Congolaise de Banque (Socobanque), founded in 1947 by the Banque de Reports et de Dépôts. In 1964, Léon Lambert shook the Belgian business establishment by launching a hostile takeover of Sofina, a prominent listed investment company; even though the bid eventually failed, it marked a milestone in Lambert's reputation as a player in international finance. By 1970, the Banque Lambert was the fourth-largest Belgian bank by total assets, behind the Générale de Banque, Banque de Bruxelles, and Kredietbank.

As early as 1953, Paul de Launoit, a prominent businessman who had controlled the Banque de Bruxelles since the late 1930s, started considering the option of a merger between that bank and the Banque Lambert. Discussions to that effect started in 1969 and continued throughout the early 1970s. In 1972, Lambert's two holding entities, Compagnie Lambert pour l'Industrie et la Finance (CLIF) and Cofinter, merged with those controlled by Launoit, Cofinindus and Brufina, to create a single entity named Compagnie Bruxelles Lambert pour la Finance et l'Industrie (CBLFI), with a combined 10 percent stake in the Banque de Bruxelles and majority control of Banque Lambert. In October 1974, in a context of high exchange rates volatility and due to inefficient internal controls, the Banque de Bruxelles incurred a major financial loss of around 3.5 billion Belgian francs on foreign-exchange markets, tilting the balance in the merger talks in favor of Banque Lambert. As a consequence, the latter was able to secure dominant influence in the merged entity in 1975, including the inclusion of the Lambert name in the merged entity's brand of Bank Brussels Lambert, and the choice of Jacques Thierry as chief executive (French: président du comité de direction) of the combined entity. The merger was completed on 30 June 1975.

== Head office building ==
In 1885, the bank moved from its former premises on Rue Neuve 20, to a more opulent building at the corner of rue d'Egmont and avenue Marnix on the outer small ring. That mansion had been erected in 1850 for aristocrat Auguste de Béthune, and was later used by Frédéric d'Ennetières, retaining its name as the hôtel d'Ennetières. It was acquired in 1883 by the Rothschilds for the Lamberts, a year after Léon's and Lucie's wedding.

In February 1956, the Hotel d'Ennetières was destroyed by accidental fire. Léon Lambert had it rebuilt on an expanded footprint with a radical design by American architect Gordon Bunshaft. By its completion in 1965, this immediately became one of the icons of modernist architecture in Brussels, as Lambert had wished it to be "the most American-looking office building that U.S. architecture could produce". The interior furnishings were provided by Kortrijk-based firm De Coene Brothers under license from Knoll, Inc. and designed by De Coene's chief designer Jérôme Dervichian. On the top (eighth) floor of the new building, Léon Lambert reserved space for his own expansive apartment decorated with a rich collection of contemporary art, with the rest of the floor hosting executive offices, the board room, and an executive dining venue. The building was expanded in 1992 on the rear side in identical style, in line with sketches made by Bunshaft in the 1970s, and has served since 1998 as the head office of ING Belgium.

== See also ==
- Banque Rothschild
- Banque Matthieu
- List of banks in Belgium
