= Albert Frère =

Belgian businessman

- Born: 4 February 1926; Fontaine-l'Évêque, near Charleroi, Belgium
- Died: 3 December 2018 (aged 92); Gerpinnes, near Charleroi, Belgium
- Occupation: Businessman
- Spouses: Nelly Depoplimont; Christine Hennuy
- Children: 3, including Gérald Frère

Albert, Baron Frère (4 February 1926 – 3 December 2018) was a Belgian billionaire businessman.

== Early life ==
Frère grew up as a son of a nail merchant and helped in the business since an early age. His father died when Frère was 17; Frère had to leave school and run the family business by himself.

== Career ==
At the age of 30, he started investing in Belgian steel factories, and by the end of the 1970s he practically controlled the whole steel industry in the region of Charleroi. He foresaw the coming steel crisis of the late 1970s and sold his enterprises to the Belgian state after merging them with the competing steel firm Cockerill to create Cockerill-Sambre.

Frère used the proceeds from this sale to build an investment empire around the Swiss holding company Pargesa which he founded with the Canadian investor Paul Desmarais. Pargesa took over the Belgian holding company Groupe Bruxelles Lambert in 1982 and over the year added significant stakes in such wide-ranging Belgian companies as Petrofina, Royale Belge Insurance, Compagnie Luxembourgoise de Télédiffusion (CLT), and Tractebel. He actively promoted international consolidation of the sectors in which he was involved, selling Banque Bruxelles Lambert to ING Group, Royale Belge to AXA, Tractebel to Suez, Petrofina to Total S.A., and RTL to Bertelsmann.

== Personal life ==
Frère was married and had three children. His first wife was Nelly Depoplimont, and they had a son, Gérald. His second wife was Christine Hennuy, and they have had two children, Ségolène, and Charles-Albert, who died in 1999, in a car crash at the age of 19.

In 1995, he received the title of baron from the Belgian king Albert II. He was a co-owner, together with Bernard Arnault of LVMH, of the Château Cheval Blanc winery near Bordeaux. He was a member of the Cercle Gaulois.

== Overview over Albert Frère's shareholdings as of May 2009 ==
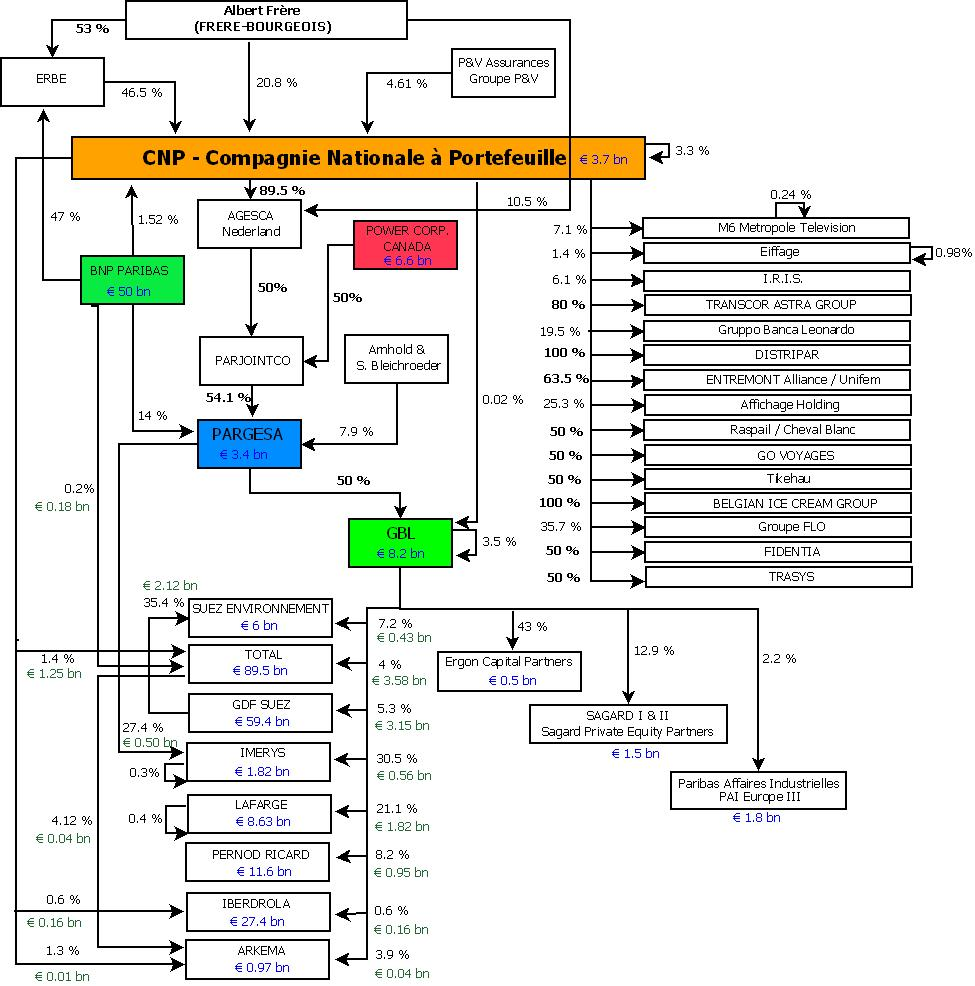

Coat of arms of Albert, Baron Frère

== Honours ==
2014 : Knight Grand Cross in the Legion of Honour.
