= Gordon Watson (antique dealer) =

British antique dealer and TV presenter

- Born: 2 March 1954 (age 72)
- Occupations: antique dealer and television presenter
- Known for: authority on 20th and 21st century design
- Website: www.gordonwatson.co.uk

Gordon Watson (born 2 March 1954) is a British antique dealer and television presenter, and "one of the world's leading authorities on 20th and 21st century design".

Watson was the only dealer to appear in all of the first four series of Channel 4's Four Rooms TV show. Since May 2016, he has his own series on BBC2, The Extraordinary Collector.

Watson lives and works in Chelsea, London.
