= Lazare Richtenberger =

Holy Roman Empire banker (1792–1853)

- Born: 1792; Aschaffenburg, Electorate of Mainz
- Died: 3 December 1853 (aged 60–61); Brussels, Belgium
- Occupation: Banker
- Years active: 1830s–1853

Lazare Richtenberger (1792 – 3 December 1853) was Holy Roman Empire-born banker of Jewish descent. He was closely connected to the court of Leopold I of Belgium and later was awarded the Order of Leopold.

Richtenberger served as James Mayer de Rothschild's agent in Brussels from 1832 on, in the early years after the foundation of the Kingdom of Belgium. He was joined by Samuel Lambert, who later became his son-in-law. As of 1843, the name of the firm was “Lambert–Richtenberger, agent Rothschild”. After Richtenberger's death in 1853, Lambert took over the firm.
