= UBI Business School =

Private establishment of higher education

- Type: Private business school
- Established: 4 April 1992, Brussels
- Academic affiliation: Middlesex University
- Dean: Dr Marcelo Leporati (UBI Brussels & UBI Luxembourg) Jenny Xia (UBI Shanghai)
- Address: Rue de Namur 48, 1000 Brussels, Belgium | Rue du Château 24, 9516 Wiltz, Luxembourg | 10F Tower B Tongji United Square, 1398 Siping Road, Yangpu District, Shanghai, P.R.China
- Campus: Multiple sites
- Language: English
- Website: https://www.ubi.edu

UBI Business School, or UBI, (formerly known as United Business Institutes) is a private establishment of higher education located in Brussels, Luxembourg and Shanghai delivering BSc, MSc, MBA and DBA programmes in Business Studies and Administration. The school was founded as an asbl (non-profit organisation) in Brussels on 4 April, 1992 and all programmes are validated by Middlesex University in the United Kingdom. Programmes at its European campuses are taught in English while the Shanghai campus programmes are taught in Mandarin Chinese.

The school's programmes are focused around three major axes: Globalisation, Digitalisation and Global Corporate Citizenship.

In 2023, the school was awarded a 5 star QS overall rating, with recognised areas of excellence for Employment, Teaching and Online Learning. The school has also been ranked #20 worldwide for its joint EMBA programme.

== Accreditation ==
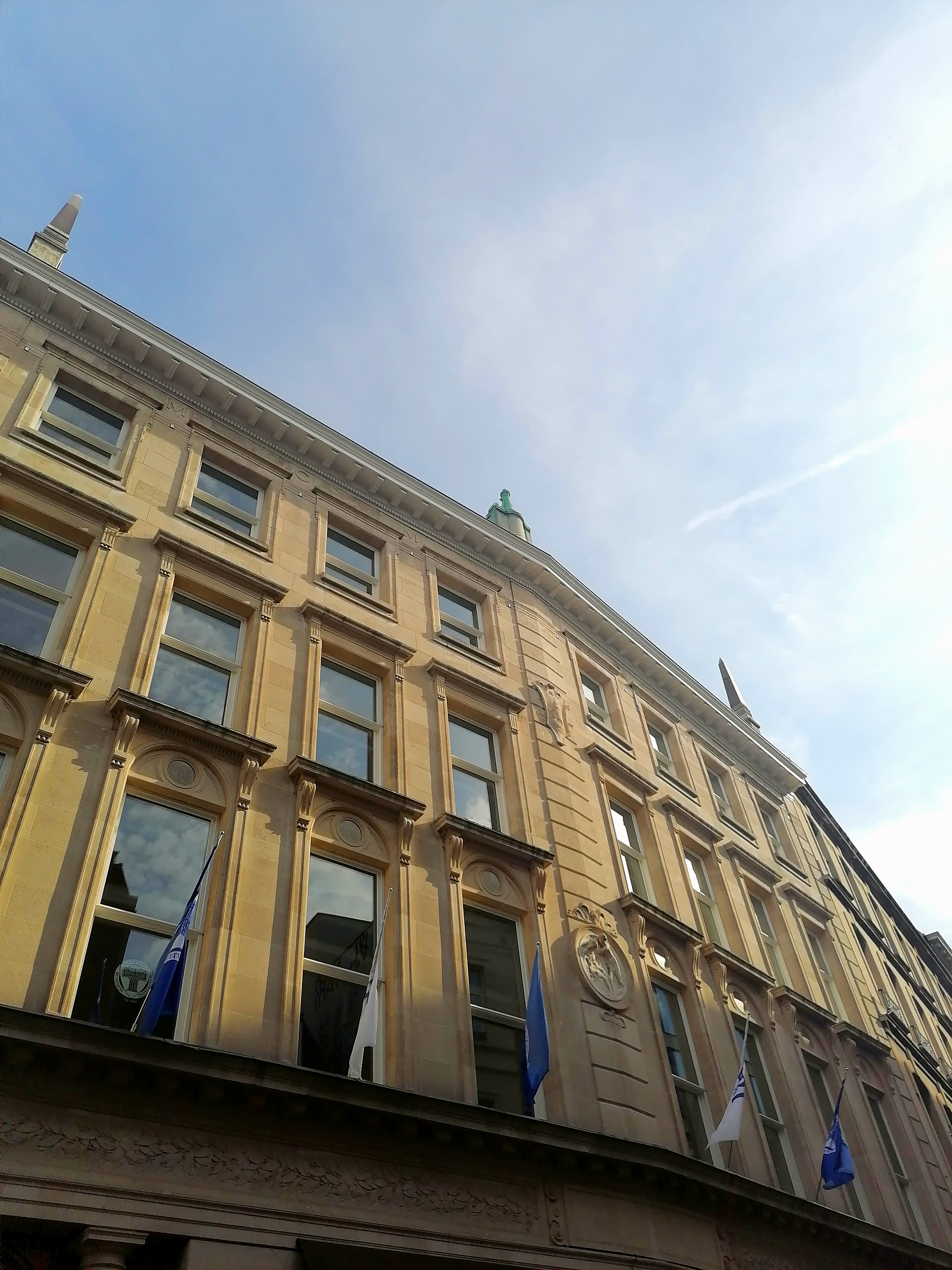
The United Business Institutes building in Brussels.

The courses correspond to the British programme style of business studies. UBI awards degrees validated by Middlesex University in the United Kingdom.

UBI and Middlesex have signed a protocol of cooperation for the realisation of the programmes. Currently, students can study Bachelor, Master in Business Administration and Doctorate programmes on UBI's campuses. Middlesex University validates UBI's programmes and oversees their quality assurance measures.

== See also ==
- Middlesex University
