= Albert Thys =

Belgian businessman (1849–1915)

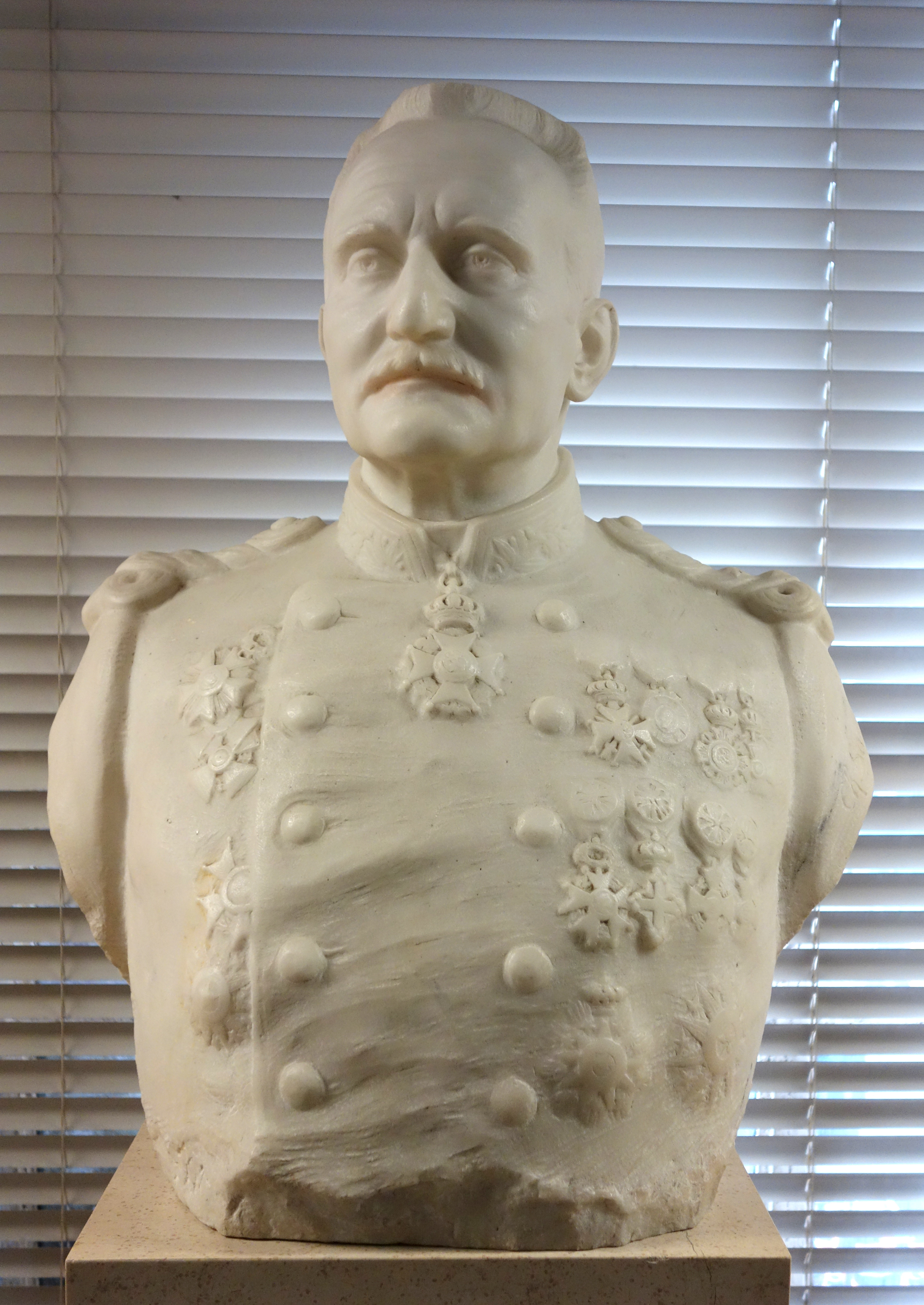
- Sculpture bust of Thys at the Royal Museum for Central Africa
- Born: 28 November 1849; Dalhem, Belgium
- Died: 10 February 1915 (aged 65); Brussels, Belgium
- Occupation: Businessman

Albert Thys (28 November 1849 – 10 February 1915) was a Belgian businessman who was active in the Congo Free State. He gave his name of Thysville to the station of Sona Qongo, currently Mbanza-Ngungu in Bas-Congo.

Born in Dalhem, Thys graduated at the École de guerre, before entering into the service of king Leopold II of Belgium in 1876, as secretary of the colonial businesses. After the return of Henry Morton Stanley, the king sent Thys to England to propose a new expedition to Central Africa on behalf of the Association Internationale Africaine. Thys was actively involved in the organisation of the first expeditions which would lead to the constitution of the Congo Free State.

After arriving in Congo in 1887 he promoted the Matadi-Léopoldville Railway, which was built from 1890 to 1898. The living conditions in the construction of this railway were miserable. The sanitary and medical facilities were insufficient. In 1892, about two thousand people worked on the railroad, of which an average of one hundred and fifty workers per month lost their lives due to smallpox, dysentery, beriberi and exhaustion. By the end of 1892, 7,000 workers had already been recruited, 3,500 of whom had died or fled (for example, to neighboring forests). These conditions made it more difficult to recruit workers. Thys therefore attracted people from Barbados and China in September and November 1892 respectively. The Barbadians refused to leave the boats in the port of Matadi until they were forced by firearms. Seven people lost their lives in this action.

He imposed a route by the south, deviating from the Congo River. He was one of the principal craftsmen of the development and the economic development of the Congo Free State and Belgian Congo. Notably he created the Compagnie du Congo pour le Commerce et l'Industrie (27 December 1886) and many of its subsidiary companies: the Compagnie du Chemin de Fer du Congo (CCFC), the Compagnie des Magasins généraux, the Société anonyme Belge pour le Commerce du Haut-Congo, the Compagnie des Produits, the Compagnie du Katanga. Thys was also instrumental in establishing the Banque d'Outremer and the Banque du Congo Belge.

He died in Brussels, aged 66, in 1915.

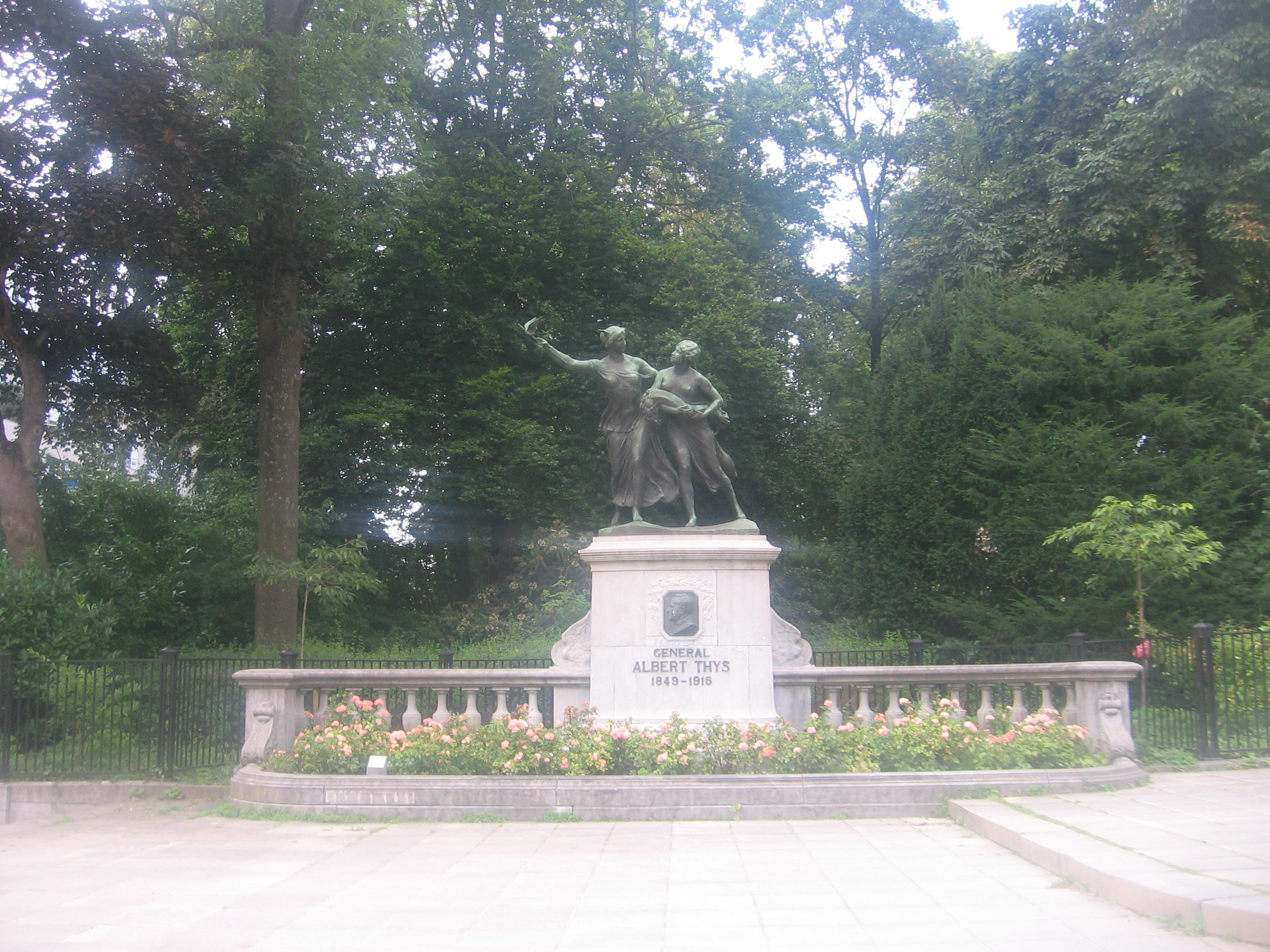
Statue of Albert Thys in Cinquantenaire, Brussels

== See also ==
- Banque d'Outremer
- Banque du Congo Belge

== Literature ==
- (in French) Georges Defauwes, Albert Thys, de Dalhem au Congo, Collection Comté de Dalhem online
