= Samuel Lambert =

Belgian banker (1806–1875)

- Born: Samuel Cahen; 15 June 1806; Lyon, France
- Died: 9 April 1875 (aged 68); Brussels, Belgium
- Occupation: Banker
- Years active: 1830–1875

Samuel Lambert (15 June 1806 – 9 April 1875) was a French-born Belgian banker of Alsatian Jewish descent. He was an agent of de Rothschild Frères in Belgium.

In 1830, he joined his father-in-law Lazare Richtenberger, who had already served as the Rothschild's agent in Brussels. He moved to Antwerp in 1850 to establish another branch of the Rothschild banking house, but returned to Brussels after Richtenberger's death in 1853, where he reorganized the Brussels and Antwerp branches under the name of Banque Lambert.

Lambert had four children:

- Léonid Lambert (1835–1918), married to Mieczysław Epstein (1833–1914)
- Marie Lambert (1841–1935), married to Émile Vanderheym (1833–1889)
- Alice Lambert (1850–?), married to Raphaël de Bauer (1843–1916)
- Léon Lambert (1851–1919), married to Zoé Lucie Betty de Rothschild (1863–1916)
