= Bank Brussels Lambert =

Former Belgian bank

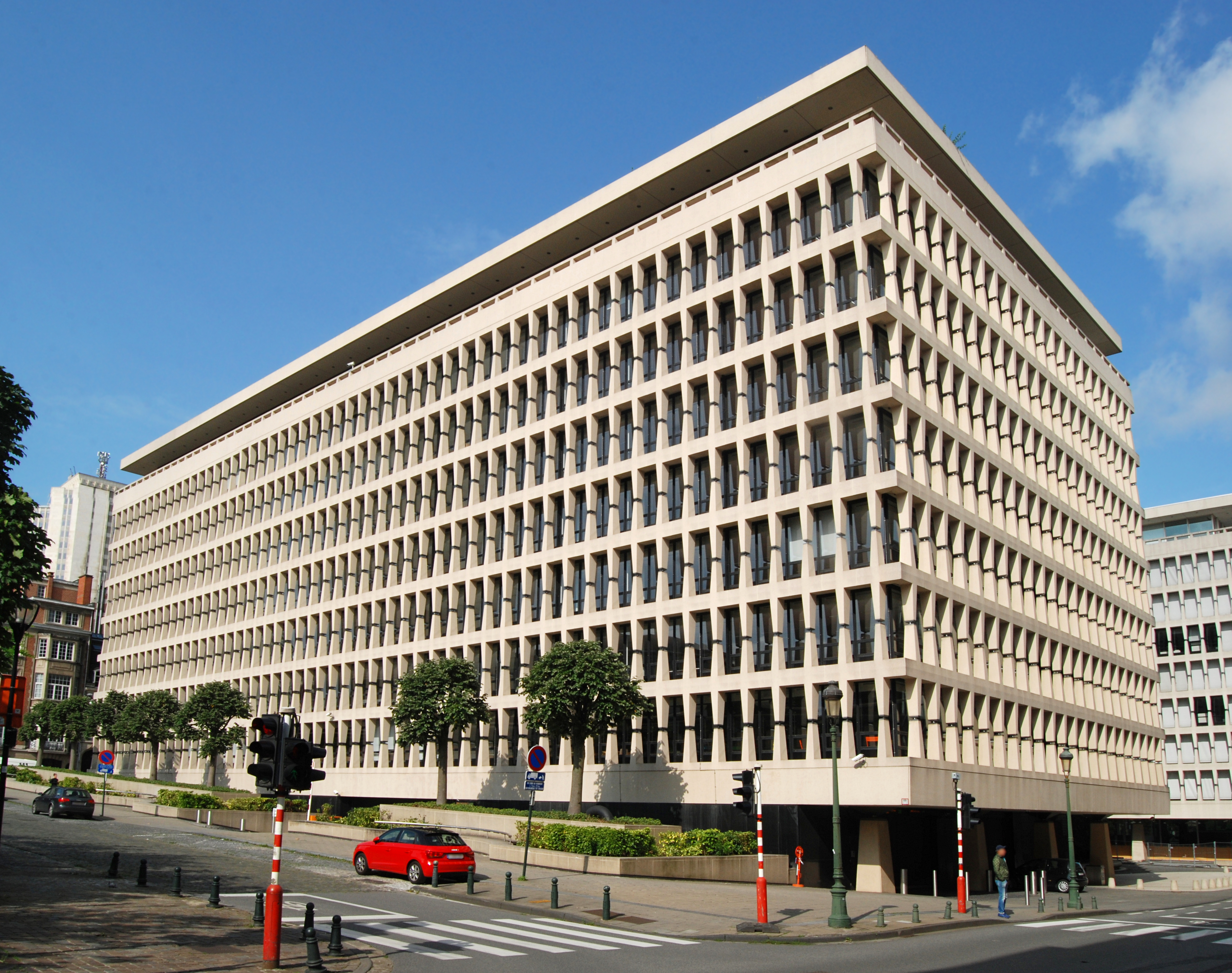
- BBL headquarters in Brussels
- Trade name: BBL
- Native name: French: Banque Bruxelles Lambert; Dutch: Bank Brussel Lambert
- Industry: financial service activities, except insurance and pension funding
- Predecessor: Banque de Bruxelles and Banque Lambert
- Founded: July 30, 1975; 50 years ago
- Defunct: 2003; 23 years ago
- Fate: Acquisition by ING Group
- Headquarters: Av. Marnix 24, City of Brussels, Belgium
- Owner: ING Group (since 1998)
- Subsidiaries: Banque de Commerce S.A.
- Website: web.archive.org/web/20021201105540fw_/http://www.bbl.be/content/en_index.htm

Bank Brussels Lambert (BBL, French: Banque Bruxelles Lambert, Dutch: Bank Brussel Lambert) was a prominent Belgian bank that was created in 1975 through the merger of Banque de Bruxelles and Banque Lambert, and was eventually acquired in 1998 by ING Group; however the name survived as part of Groupe Bruxelles Lambert, which controlled the bank prior to its acquisition.

== Overview ==
The 1975 merger made BBL the second largest Belgian bank at that time, behind Generale Bank. It provided retail and commercial banking services to individuals and businesses in Belgium, together with related financial products such as insurance and asset management.

In 2003, ING rebranded BBL as ING Belgium.

The headquarters of BBL, now an office of ING Group, was the former head office building of Bank Lambert on Marnixlaan 24, Brussels. This modernist building was the only European building designed by the American architect Gordon Bunshaft making it one of the most important modernist architectural buildings in Belgium.

== See also ==
- Dexia
- Fortis Group
- KBC Group
- List of banks in Belgium
