= Bank of Brussels =

Former Belgian bank

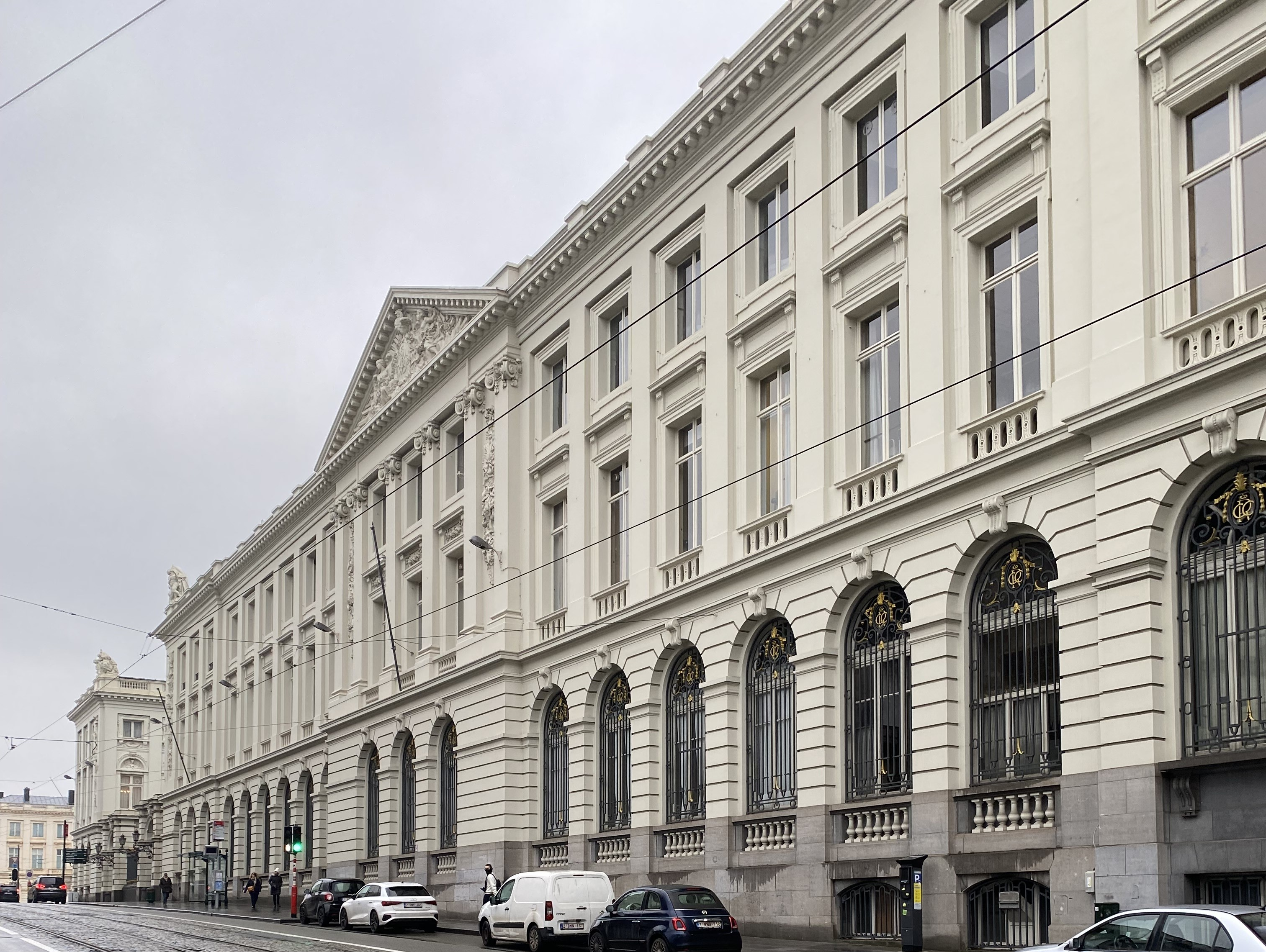
- The bank's head office from 1924 to 1975, incorporating the Palace of the Count of Flanders in Brussels
- Native name: French: Banque de Bruxelles, Dutch: Bank van Brussel
- Type: Private company
- Industry: Financial services
- Founded: 1871; 155 years ago
- Founders: Jacques Errera, Giacomo (Jacques) Errera
- Defunct: 1975; 51 years ago
- Fate: Merged
- Successor: Banque Bruxelles Lambert
- Headquarters: Brussels, Belgium
- Area served: Belgium, Netherlands, Africa
- Products: Banking services, investment banking

The Bank of Brussels (French: Banque de Bruxelles, Dutch: Bank van Brussel) was a prominent bank in Brussels, established in 1871 and merged in 1975 with Banque Lambert to form Banque Bruxelles Lambert. It was Belgium's second-largest bank for most of its existence, behind the Société Générale de Belgique and, from 1934 onwards, its spun-off banking subsidiary.

== History ==
In 1871, Venetian Jewish banker Giacomo (Jacques) Errera created the Banque de Bruxelles with support from a group of Dutch and German financiers including his father-in-law, Frankfurt-born banker Joseph Oppenheim. Following the downturn of the mid-1870s, the fledgling bank encountered financial distress, and Errera had to liquidate and re-establish it in 1877 on a smaller scale. Its operations and investments grew rapidly in the late 19th century.

In 1916, under the German occupation of Belgium during World War I, the Banque de Bruxelles took over the Banque Internationale de Bruxelles. The latter, established at 27 Avenue des Arts on the corner with Rue de la Loi, had been jointly created in 1898 by the Deutsche Bank, Darmstädter Bank, Disconto-Gesellschaft, Berliner Handels-Gesellschaft, and A. Schaaffhausen'scher Bankverein.

In 1920, led by its new chairman Maurice Despret, the Banque de Bruxelles established the Crédit General du Congo (also known as Crégéco), legally registered in Léopoldville with administrative headquarters (French: siège administratif) at the Bank of Brussels head office at Rue Royale 66 in Brussels. In 1924, the Bank of Brussels relocated its head office from 66, rue Royale to the former Palace of the Count of Flanders at 2, rue de la Régence. In 1929, it transferred Crégéco's banking operations to a newly created affiliate, the Banque Belge d'Afrique, while retaining Crégéco as a listed investment company. The BBA operated from the back of the Banque de Bruxelles building, at rue de Namur 3. In 1928, the bank also absorbed two smaller peers: the Brussels-based Banque Matthieu, whose origins went back to 1754, and the Crédit Général Liégeois, established in Liège as a joint-stock bank since 1885.

In 1930, the Banque de Bruxelles controlled a rapidly expanding network of 20 local banks with 400 offices, which it fully absorbed the next year into the parent banking entity. Following the financial turmoil of the early 1930s, Belgium passed legislation in 1934 that forced separation between commercial banks and investment companies. As a consequence, the Banque de Bruxelles' parent company was renamed as Société de Bruxelles pour la finance et l'industrie, abbreviated as Brufina, while a new banking subsidiary was formed on 30 January 1935 under the name Banque de Bruxelles. Following the initial public offering of the new entity's share, Brufina held 71 percent of the Banque de Bruxelles's equity. In 1937, Brufina in turn fell under the control of Belgian businessman Paul de Launoit through his holding company the Compagnie financière et industrielle (Cofinindus). As a result, the Banque de Bruxelles formed the banking hub of a cluster of industrial, financial and colonial businesses subsequently known as the groupe de Launoit, second only to the Société Générale de Belgique.

De Launoit and the Banque de Bruxelles ambiguously navigated the harsh conditions of the German occupation of Belgium during World War II, participating in economic activity benefiting the Nazis, while simultaneously hosting a resistance network in the bank's own premises in central Brussels.

In 1948, Crégéco was renamed the Compagnie Financière Africaine (FINAF), which later became the Compagnie financière et de gestion pour l'étranger (Cometra).

The bank expanded its Belgian branch network in the 1960s, in competition with established incumbents the Générale de Banque in Wallonia and Kredietbank in Flanders. In 1962, it acquired Antwerp-based Banque de Commerce from Barclays which received Banque de Bruxelles equity in exchange; in 1965, it allowed the Chase Manhattan Bank to acquire joint ownership of Banque de Commerce, whose head office was subsequently relocated from Antwerp to Brussels in 1968.

In October 1969, Brufina sold part of its residual stake in Banque de Bruxelles to Algemene Bank Nederland (ABN), then repurchased some of it following a political backlash. As a result, by 1972 the bank's largest shareholders were Brufina with 7 percent, ABN with 3.5 percent, and Barclays with 3.2 percent.

As early as 1953, Paul de Launoit started considering the option of a merger between the Banque de Bruxelles and the Banque Lambert. Discussions to that effect started in 1969 and continued throughout the early 1970s. In 1972, the Banque Lambert's controlling shareholder Léon Lambert merged his two holding companies, Compagnie Lambert pour l'Industrie et la Finance (CLIF) and Cofinter, with Cofinindus and Brufina to create a single entity, named Compagnie Bruxelles Lambert pour la Finance et l'Industrie (CBLFI), with a combined 10 percent stake in the Banque de Bruxelles and majority control of Banque Lambert. In October 1974, in a context of high exchange rates volatility and due to inefficient internal controls, the Banque de Bruxelles incurred a major financial loss of around 3.5 billion Belgian francs on foreign-exchange markets, tilting the balance in the merger talks in favor of Banque Lambert. As a consequence, the latter was able to secure dominant influence in the merged entity in 1975, including the inclusion of the Lambert name in the merged entity's brand of Bank Brussels Lambert, and the choice of Jacques Thierry, an associate of Léon Lambert, as chief executive (French: président du comité de direction) of the combined entity. The merger was completed on 30 June 1975.

== Leadership ==
The successive chairs of the bank were:

- Jacques Errera, banker, 1871-1881
- Jules Urban, engineer, 1881-1901
- Ernest Urban, engineer and brother of Jules, 1901-1909
- Hermann Stern, former manager of the bank, 1909-1910
- Georges de Laveleye, former director of the Banque d'Outremer, 1010-1919
- Maurice Despret, son of a Vice Governor of the Société générale de Belgique, 1919-1930
- William Thys, son of Albert Thys and former général manager of Banque d'Outremer, 1930-1932
- Maurice Houtart, former minister, 1932-1939
- Max-Léo Gérard, former finance minister, 1939-1952
- Louis Camu, former academic and civil servant, 1952-1975

Alexandre Lamfalussy was the bank's managing director (French: Président du Comité de Direction) from 1965 to 1975.

== See also ==
- Société Générale de Belgique
- ASLK / CGER
- List of banks in Belgium
