= Ozerk Ozan =

Norwegian businessman (born 1979)

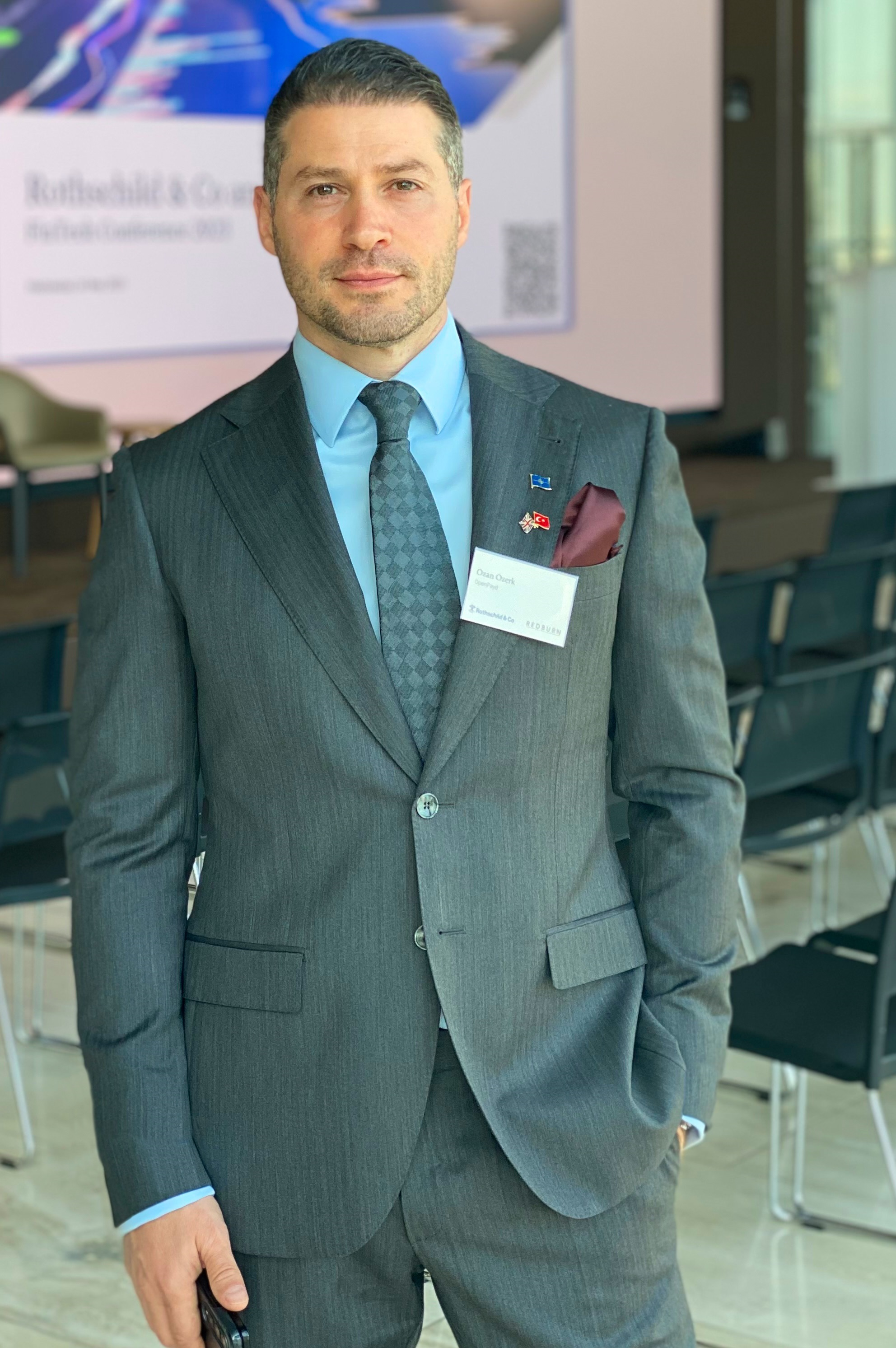
- Ozan in 2023
- Born: August 1, 1979 (age 47); Cyprus
- Citizenship: Norway
- Education: University of Oslo
- Known for: founder of OpenPayd, EMBank and Biip.no

Ozerk Ozan (born 1979) is a Norwegian fintech entrepreneur, lecturer, best known as the founder of banking-as-a-service provider OpenPayd, European Merchant Bank (EMBank), and the co-founder of Norsk Ideutvikling AS, the social networking service Biip.no.

He is a frequent guest speaker at global finance conferences.

== Early life ==
Ozan was born in Nicosia, Cyprus, in 1979. At a young age, he moved to Norway with his family. His father, Ozerk Kamil, is a professor at the Department of Education at the University of Oslo.

== Education ==
Ozan studied medicine at the University of Oslo from 2002 to 2008.

== Career ==
In 2002, Ozan founded Norsk Ideutvikling AS. In 2005, the company launched the online community Biip.no, which quickly gained popularity, amassing a user base of 450,000 users within two years. In 2008, the company were sold to Egmont Group and Nettavisen. The approximate amount from the share sale was 100 million kroner, as reported by E24 Næringsliv.

In 2018, he consolidated his early companies under OpenPayd, headquartered in London. As of 2024, OpenPayd processes over GBP £100 billion in volume annually.

In November 2018, Ozan founded European Merchant Bank (EMBank). By the end of 2021, EMBank's business loan portfolio reached €29.7 million, and the bank generated an income of €4.3 million.

== Personal views ==
=== Financial Inclusion ===
Ozerk has frequently mentioned the problems of inclusion facing the underbanked and unbanked, citing the problems arising from the reduced use of cash as currency, the pitfalls of AI that could further discriminate the financially disadvantaged and the growing worldwide inequality gap between the rich and poor.

=== Fintech industry ===
Ozerk believes regulators are struggling to keep up with innovations in fintech but that the sector will continue to grow driven by the necessity for Banking-as-as-Service offerings to bridge the gap between traditional and alternative payment methods and the difficulty in businesses obtaining financial licenses. He is similarly bullish on the growth of embedded finance, citing how it can reduce costs, increase profits and drive customer loyalty, with UK brands likely to claim the majority of the £619 billion European financial services market in the next 5 years.
