= Antwerp Diamond Bank =

Bank that specialized exclusively in serving the diamond and the diamond jewelry sector

- Industry: Banking
- Founded: 1934
- Defunct: 2014
- Headquarters: Antwerp, Belgium

The Antwerp Diamond Bank (ADB; French: Banque Diamantaire Anversoise, Dutch: Antwerpse Diamantbank), created in 1934 and known during its first few years as Comptoir Diamantaire Anversois, was a small bank that specialized exclusively in serving the diamond and the diamond-jewelry industry. In addition to its headquarters in Antwerp, it had offices covering major traditional as well as emerging diamond centers such as Dubai, Geneva, Hong Kong, Mumbai, and New York. In 1999, ADB became a wholly owned subsidiary of KBC Bank, and in 2014 it was wound down after a sale process to the Chinese Yinren Group failed.

== Early years ==
Société Belge de Banque established the Comptoir Diamantaire Anversois (CDA) in 1934, in partnership with Banque Transatlantique, Société Internationale Forestière et Minière du Congo, and the De Beers Group. The CDA was the first financial institution to focus solely and entirely on the needs of the diamond industry. It opened its registered office in the Antwerp diamond district.

In 1937, Belgium passed bank reform legislation that allowed the CDA to become a bank, upon which the company changed its name to Antwerp Diamond Bank. It simultaneously doubled its equity base to BEF60 million (approximately 1.5 million euros), by bringing in the Kredietbank and Banque de Bruxelles as shareholders.

== World War II ==
The diamond industry in Antwerp was heavily Jewish in its membership and so suffered inordinately during the German occupation of Belgium during World War II. The ADB had been proactive, however. In 1940, before the German invasion, it moved its clients' diamond stock, consisting of both loan collateral and goods in custody, then valued at BEF 100 million (circa 2.5 million euros), and shipped them via France to England and ultimately to the United States. When the German occupation forces arrived they found the safes, safe deposit boxes, and accounts empty.

In 1941, Chemical Bank helped ADB establish a special agency in New York. After the liberation in 1944, ADB, whose headquarters had moved from Antwerp to Brussels during the war, returned to Antwerp and its clients.

== Postwar expansion and 1980s crisis ==
After the war, ADB helped revive the Belgian diamond industry as the industry relocated from Amsterdam to Antwerp. Because of its ties to DeBeers, ADB was a major participant in the financing of rough diamonds at the sights (sales) that DeBeers conducted in London through the Central Selling Organization.

In 1949 ADB closed its New York City branch. That same year, Forminière sold its shares in ADB to Société Minière de Bécéka (Sibeka). In 1966, Transatlantique sold its shares in ADP, followed by Sibeka in 1985.

In the early 1980s, both the ADB and the broader diamond banking community worldwide faced challenges when the international diamond market came under pressure. ADB was able to maintain its position, however, with the support of its shareholders and its customers.

In 1982, ADB established the Antwerp Diamond Bank (Switzerland) (French: Banque Diamantaire Anversoise (Suisse)), a wholly owned subsidiary in Geneva, focusing on financing international diamond transactions and on portfolio management.

== Within KBC Group ==
In 1999, KBC Group acquired the shares in ADB that the Générale de Banque (which had merged with Société Belge de Banque in 1965) and Bank Brussels Lambert (the result of the 1975 merger of Banque de Bruxelles and Banque Lambert) had held. KBC thereby became the primary shareholder in ADB, increasing its ownership from 37 to 87 percent.

That same year, ADB again opened a representative office in New York under the name Antwerpse Diamantbank. The next year ADB opened a representative office in Hong Kong. The name of ADB's Swiss subsidiary became Diamond Bank (Switzerland). On 6 December 2001; the New York representative office changed its name to Antwerp Diamond Bank.

In 2002, KBC Bank increased its stake in ADB to 99.9%. To do so, KBC bought out Henfin Holding, which had represented De Beers on the board of ADB as one of its founding shareholders. That same year, ADB opened a branch in Mumbai, the center for India's diamond industry, with a staff of about 20. (The industry in Mumbai started out with small diamonds, "cutting the uncuttable". It later gained a share of the market for moderately big diamonds, previously dominated by Tel Aviv, then started to encroach on cutting big diamonds, Antwerp's forte.)

In 2005, Diamond Bank (Switzerland) opened a representative office in Dubai. In 2008, ADB established a subsidiary in Singapore, Antwerp Diamond Bank Asia Pacific. This was a regional headquarters that supports and develop activities in Mumbai, Hong Kong and possible future initiatives in China. ADB was the first bank to create a commercial paper program for the diamond industry. The client was an Indian-owned company in Antwerp.

In 2008, Diamond Bank (Switzerland) ceased to operate as a subsidiary and instead became a representative office of ADP, which also took over the responsibility for the Dubai rep office. In 2009, ADB signed a memorandum of understanding with the Bank of China.

== See also ==
- Banque d'Anvers
- Crédit Anversois
- Banque de Commerce
- List of banks in Belgium
