= Banque Belge pour l'Étranger =

Belgian bank

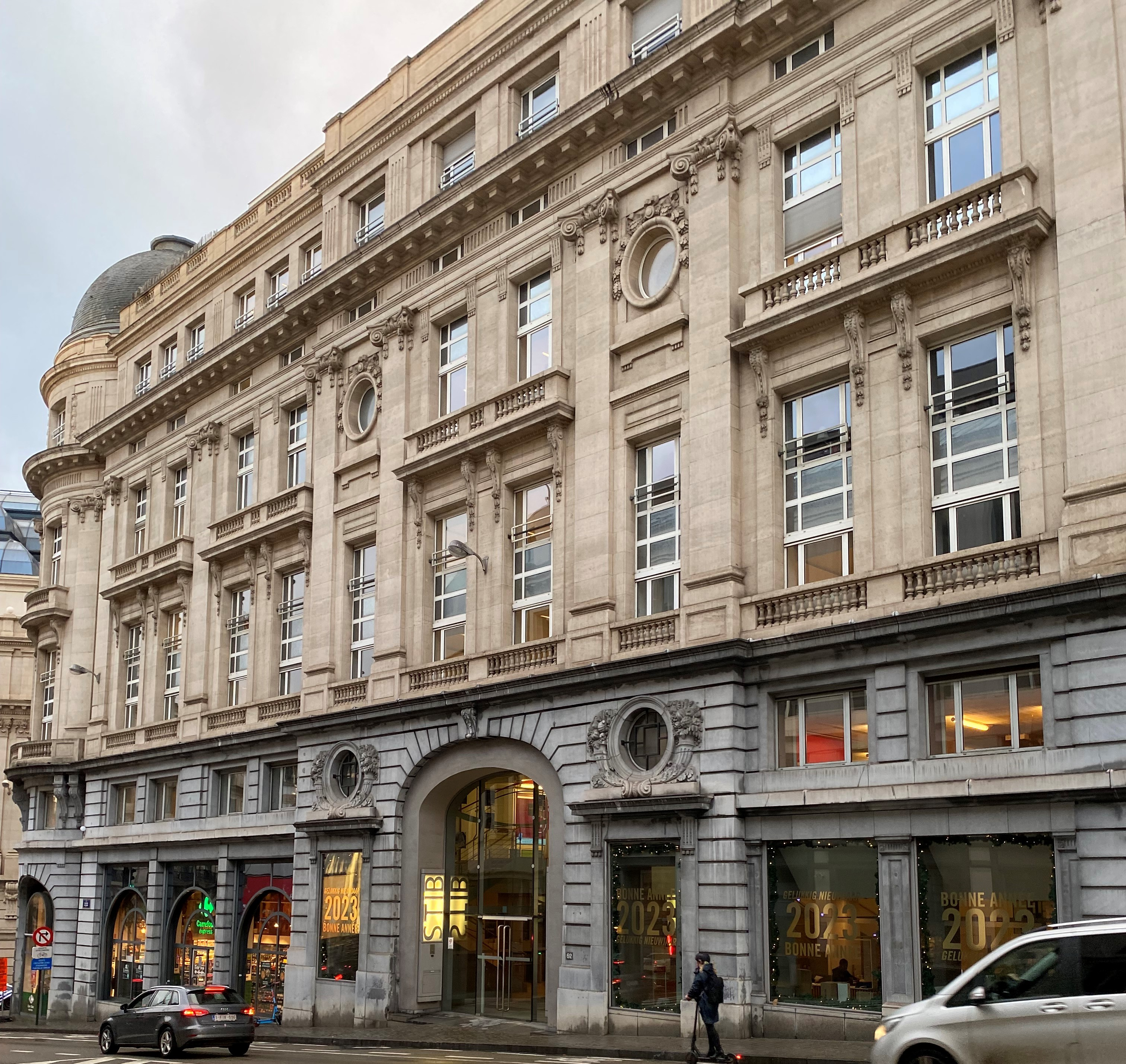
Building at Rue des Colonies / Koloniënstraat 66 in Brussels, head office of Banque Belge pour l'Étranger in the interwar period. It was initially erected in 1909 as Palais de l'Expansion on a design by architect Franz Van Ophem, then repurposed in 1913 as Brussels branch of the Antwerp-based Banque de Reports, de Fonds Publics & de Dépôts (BRFPD), and used by the Société Générale de Belgique (SGB) and the BBE following the BRFPD's acquisition by the SGB affiliate the Banque d'Anvers in 1919

The Banque Belge pour l'Étranger (BBE, lit. 'Belgian Bank for Lands Abroad') was a Belgian bank that channeled many international banking operations of its controlling shareholder the Société Générale de Belgique (SGB) in the first half of the 20th century. It was originally established by the SGB in 1902 in Brussels as the Banque Sino-Belge ("Sino-Belgian Bank"), at the request of King Leopold II of Belgium.

The BBE's Hong Kong entity, first established in 1935, became the hub of its Asian operations following in the 1950s. It was renamed the Belgian Bank in 1980, Générale de Banque belge pour l’Étranger in 1985, General Belgian Bank in 1992, and Fortis Bank Asia (Chinese: 華比富通銀行) in 2000, and in 2005 was eventually acquired by the Industrial and Commercial Bank of China through its Hong Kong subsidiary ICBC (Asia).

== History ==
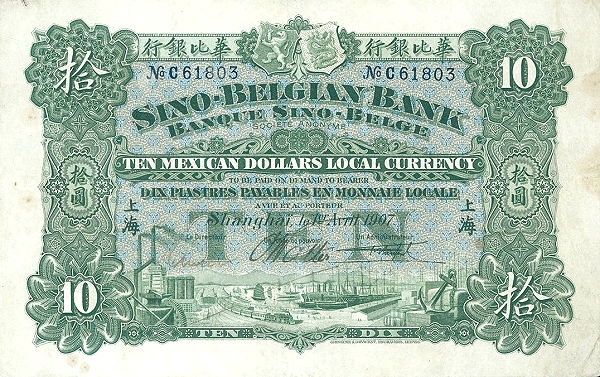
Banknote of the Banque Sino-Belge (1907)

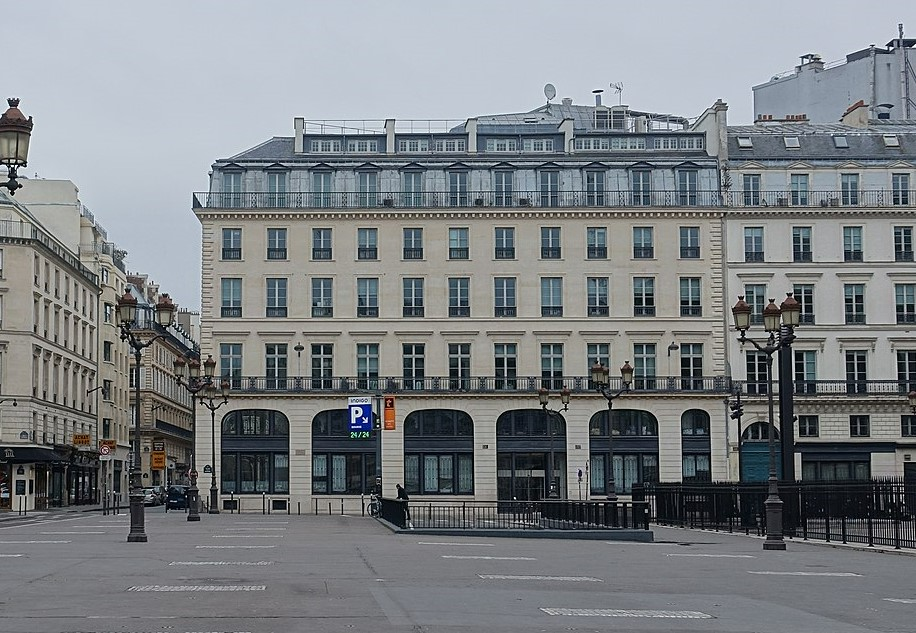
Former Paris branch building of the BBE at 12, place de la Bourse

The Banque Sino-Belge was created in 1902, as Belgium, like other foreign powers with presence in China, was entitled to payments from the Qing Dynasty empire under the Boxer Protocol. Alongside the Société Générale de Belgique (SGB), its original investors included the Société Générale Africaine (which would merge into the Banque Sino-Belge in 1905), the Compagnie Internationale d'Orient (an affiliate of Albert Thys's Banque d'Outremer), and the Antwerp-based Banque de Reports, de Fonds Publics et de Dépôts. Its first chairman was Victor Stoclet (father of Adolphe Stoclet), who was succeeded in 1905 by Ferdinand Baeyens and in 1913 by Jean Jadot who kept the position until his death in 1932. It was initially domiciled at the head office of the SGB at 1-3 rue Montagne du Parc in Brussels.

The bank immediately opened a branch in Shanghai, followed by Tianjin in 1906, London in 1909, Beijing in 1911, Cairo in 1912, and Alexandria in 1914. In 1913, the bank's London subsidiary substantially developed its footprint by merging with the Anglo-Foreign Banking Company Ltd (est. 1872). The Banque Sino-Belge subsequently changed its name to Banque Belge pour l'Étranger and marketed itself as a subsidiary of the Générale de Belgique, which the latter had not allowed until then.

During World War I while Belgium was under German occupation, the bank was managed from its London office. It also opened a branch in the Netherlands, which had remained neutral, in Rotterdam in 1915. It became the principal bank of the Commission for Relief in Belgium. After the war's end, its network expanded considerably to Cologne (1919), New York, Paris and Bucharest (1920), Brăila, Hankou and Manchester (1922), and Constantinople (1924). It also invested in several companies and banks across Europe including the Banco de Cartagena in Spain, Wiener Bankverein in Austria, the latter's prewar affiliates in Czechoslovakia, Poland and Yugoslavia, and the Banque Franco-Belge de Bulgarie established in 1920 in Bulgaria, which became the Banque Franco-Belge et Balkanique in 1929 following merger with the Wiener Bankverein's subsidiary Banque Balkanique.

Much of that expansion was reversed from 1929 and 1935, as the economic context became less favorable. The branches in Romania and Turkey were sold, and the others were transformed into subsidiaries. In 1929, the Egyptian branches became the Banque Belge et Internationale en Egypte (BBIE, also known as Belginter). The Paris branch then became a French bank, the one in London became a British bank in 1934, and the Chinese branches became a Chinese bank in 1935. Following new Belgian banking legislation in 1935, the holding company in Belgium was liquidated and the individual banking subsidiaries, as well as stakes in industrial companies, were taken over directly by the Générale de Belgique.

In 1935, the BBE opened another subsidiary in Hong Kong, which became its only operation in China during the 1950s as the operations in Beijing, Tianjin and Shanghai were nationalized by the new Communist government. The BBE further developed its activity in Hong Kong, which at some point was the third-largest foreign branch network in the colony behind HSBC and Standard Chartered. In 1948, the Paris-based Banque Belge pour l'Etranger (France) was acquired by the Banque de l'Union Parisienne. In 1950, the New York subsidiary of the London-based Banque Belge pour l'Etranger (Overseas) was converted into a subsidiary, as a precautionary measure against a scenario of Soviet invasion of Europe, and renamed as the Belgian American Banking Corporation, which in 1968 would be merged with U.S. affiliates of other European banks to form the European-American Banking Corporation,. These banks were chaired by Wall Street investment banker Jean Cattier , son of banker Félicien Cattier. In 2001, the bank was eventually acquired by Citibank. The London-based BBE (Overseas) was renamed Banque Belge Ltd. in 1957; in 1970, it absorbed the London branch of the Banque Italo-Belge, another affiliate of the Générale de Belgique, and in 1988 contributed its merchant banking operations to the newly created branch of Generale Bank, while keeping private banking under the Banque Belge Ltd brand. In 1960, the BBIE in Egypt was nationalized and renamed the Banque de Port-Said, and eventually absorbed in 1971 by Banque Misr.

The BBE in Hong Kong has been the banker of the Catholic Diocese of Hong Kong and also one of the two banks in the region to provide equipment loans. In September 2003, Fortis announced that it would sell it to ICBC (Asia). The operations that were to be merged with ICBC (Asia) were again renamed "Belgian Bank" (Chinese: 華比銀行) on May 1, 2004, pending a full merger with ICBC (Asia), which required approval by the Legislative Council of Hong Kong, and started using the ICBC logo. On October 10, 2005, the merger was completed successfully with all branches of Belgian Bank renamed as ICBC (Asia).

== Banknotes ==
Like other foreign banks in China during the late Qing Empire, the Banque Sino-Belge issued paper currency in the concessions where it had established branch offices.

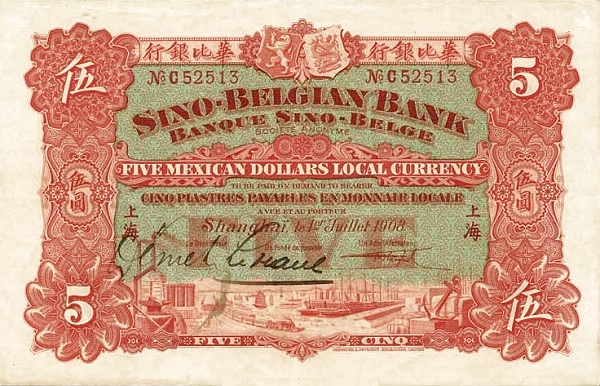
5 Mexican Dollars Local Currency (French: piastres payables en monnaie locale), Shanghai branch (1908)

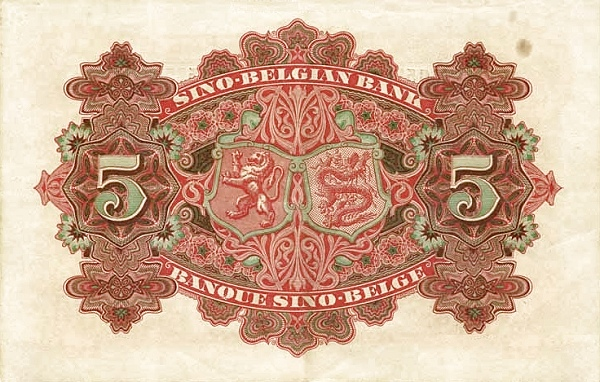
Reverse of same note

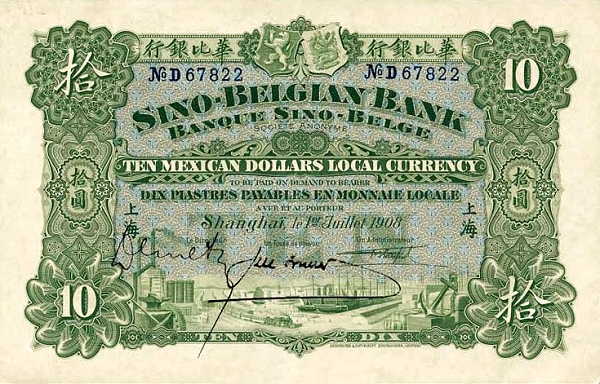
10 Mexican Dollars, Shanghai (1908)

== See also ==
- Deutsch-Asiatische Bank
- Franco-Chinese Bank
- Russo-Chinese Bank
- Banque Italo-Belge
- List of banks in Belgium
