= Banque Italo-Belge =

Former Belgian bank

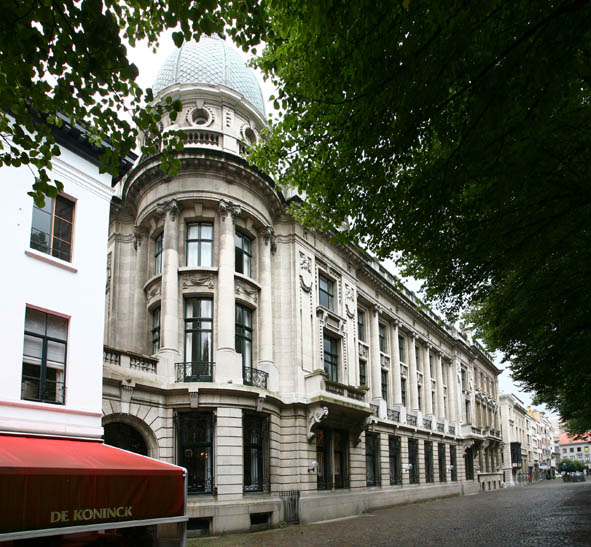
Building at Graanmarkt 2 in Antwerp, built for the Banque de l'Union Anversoise in 1911-1913, where the Banque Italo-Belge was co-headquartered between 1913 and 1920

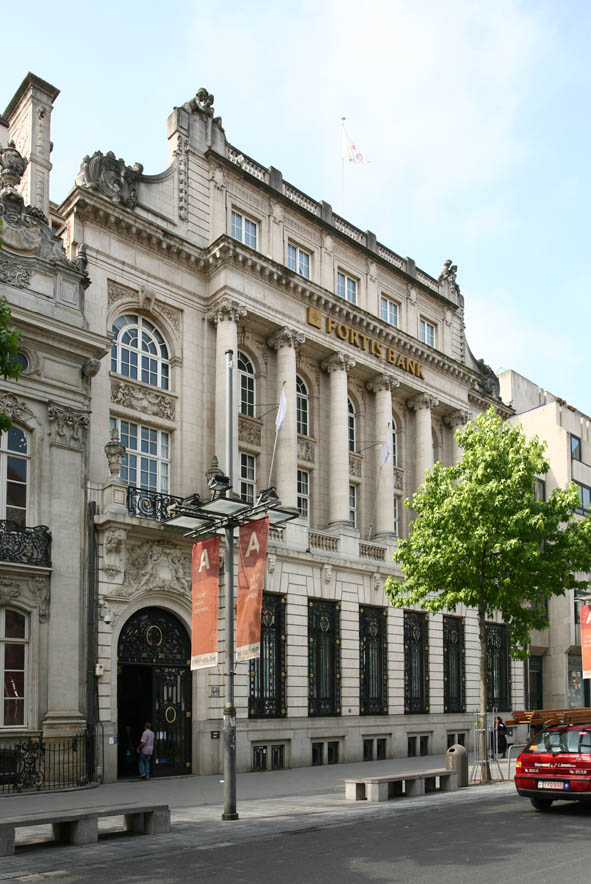
Building at Meir 48 in Antwerp, head office of the Banque d'Anvers where the Banque Italo-Belge was co-headquartered from 1920 to the early 1960s when it relocated to Brussels

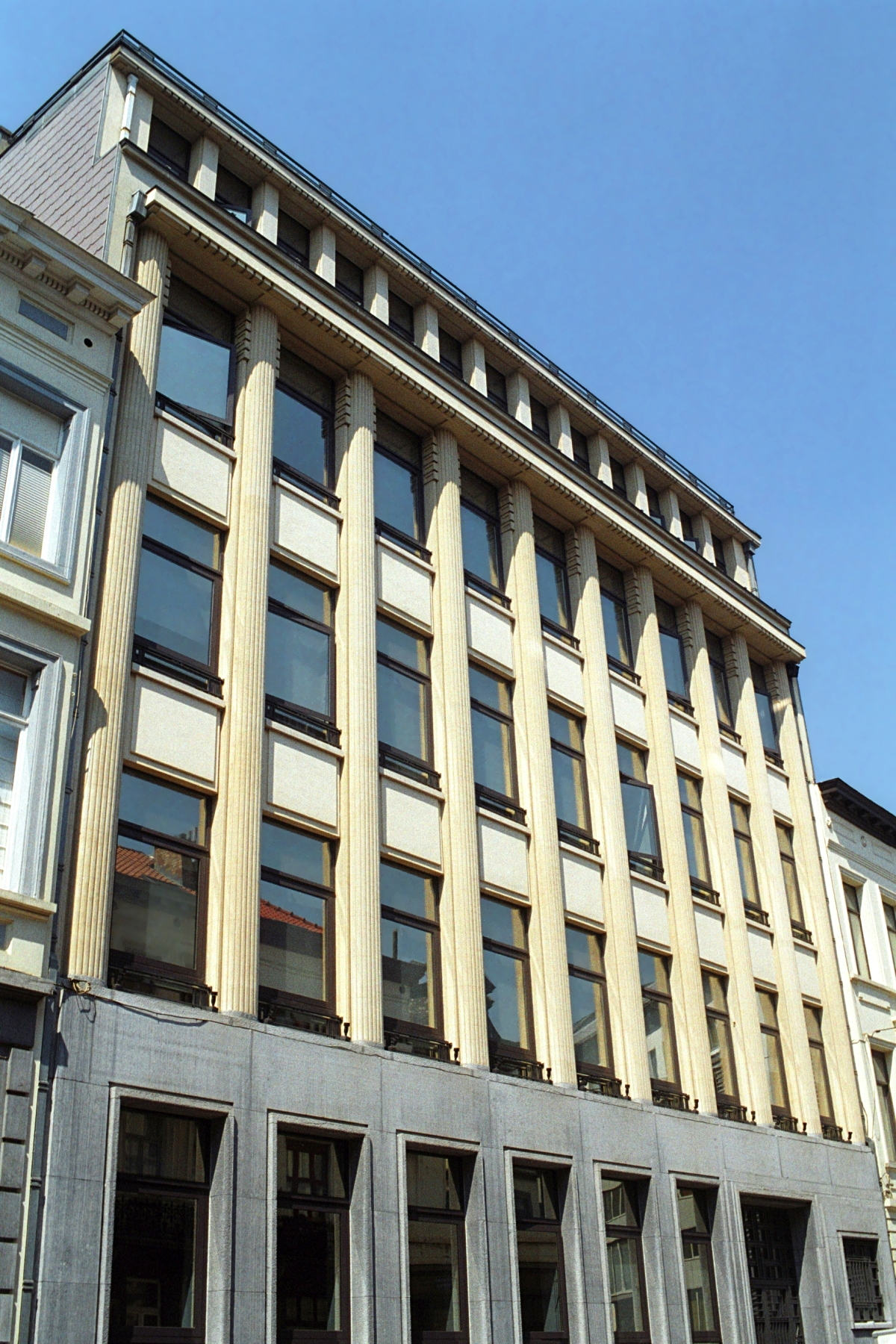
Building at Rue de l'Association 59 in Brussels, head office of Banque Italo-Belge, then of the Banque Européenne pour l'Amérique Latine from 1964 to 1998

The Banque Italo-Belge (lit. 'Italian-Belgian Bank') was a Belgian bank established in 1911 on the initiative of the Société Générale de Belgique (SGB) jointly with Credito Italiano and other partners. Despite its name, it operated mainly in South America. It was known as the Banque Brésilienne Italo-Belge before 1913, and Banque Européenne pour l'Amérique Latine (BEAL) after 1974. By the late 1930s, it was the fourth-largest Belgian bank by total assets behind the Banque de la Société Générale, Banque de Bruxelles, and Kredietbank.

== Background ==
In the early 20th century, the Banque d'Anvers, the SGB's affiliate in Antwerp, developed operations in Argentina in relation with local businessman Edouard Bunge. In 1907, the SGB fostered the merger between two London-based banks in which it had acquired equity stakes, the Bank of Tarapacá and Argentina and the Anglo-Argentine Bank, to form the Anglo-South American Bank. In 1910 a separate institution, the Banque de l'Union Anversoise, was created by the SGB and the Banque d’Anvers together with the Banque de l'Union Parisienne (in which the SGB was also a significant shareholder) in order to develop financial relations with South America. The Banque de l'Union Anversoise was eventually merged into the Banque d'Anvers in 1919.

== Banque Brésilienne Italo-Belge ==
In 1911, the SGB, together with the Anglo-South American Bank and the Banque de l’Union Anversoise, teamed up with the Credito Italiano, industrialist Emmanuel Janssen, Bunge, and partnering businessmen to form the Banque Brésilienne Italo-Belge. It opened an office in São Paulo and soon afterwards in Campinas and Santos, then in 1912 in Montevideo and 1914 in Rio de Janeiro and Buenos Aires. A capital increase in 1913 allowed the Banque Belge pour l'Étranger, another SGB affiliate, to join the group of controlling shareholders. That same year, as its business had already started to expand beyond Brazil, the bank's name was shortened to Banque Italo-Belge. The Credito Italiano initially held a 40 percent stake.

== Banque Italo-Belge ==
New offices were opened in London and Paris during World War I, then in 1920 in Santiago and Valparaíso. This network was complemented by a branch in Porto Alegre in 1952. In 1920, its head office in Antwerp was relocated to Meir 48, together with that of the Banque d'Anvers. By 1939, following successive capital increases, the Credito Italiano's stake had been reduced to around 12.5 percent, and the Banque de la Société Générale exercised dominant control.

== Banque Européenne pour l'Amérique Latine ==
In 1974, the bank was renamed the Banque Européenne pour l'Amérique Latine. By 1977 the BEAL's shareholders included the SGB (with 25 percent) and Credito Italiano but also France's Société Générale, the Netherlands' AMRO Bank, Spain's Banco Español de Crédito, Switzerland's Credit Suisse, and the UK's Midland Bank. By 1992, WestLB had become a significant shareholder of BEAL.

In 1998, the BEAL's seat moved from downtown Brussels, where it had been domiciled at the former Electrorail Building since 1964, to a new address at Chaussée de La Hulpe 166. It appears to have ceased operations in the 2000s.

== See also ==
- Banque Belge pour l'Étranger
- Banque du Congo Belge
- List of banks in Belgium
