= XDC =

XDC or xdc may refer to:

- CinemaNext, a Belgian cinema exhibition services company which was previously known as XDC from 2004 to 2012
- Dacian language (ISO 639-3: xdc), an extinct language of the Indo-European family
