= Ekmel Cilingir =

Turkish businessman

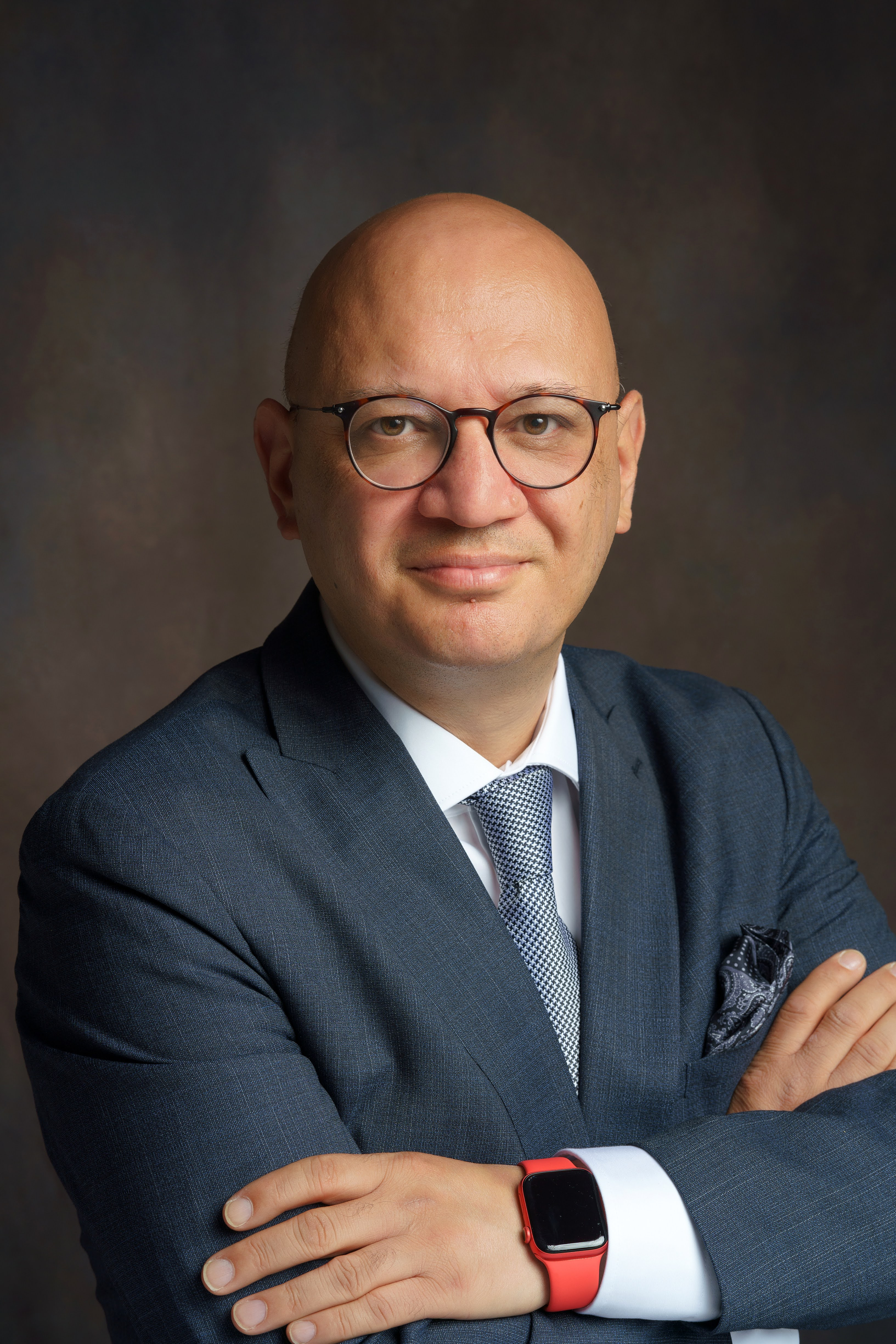
- Born: Samsun, Turkey
- Education: Uludag University
- Occupation: Banker
- Known for: Chairman of the Supervisory Board of EMBank

Ekmel Cilingir (Samsun, Turkey) is a Turkish banker who spent much of career working in Malta and serves as the Chairman of supervisory board of Lithuanian bank EMBank.

== Early life and education ==
Ekmel Çilingir completed his secondary education at 19 Mayıs High School. He obtained his bachelor's degree in economics from Uludag University in Turkey.

Çilingir acquired several certifications throughout his career, including the ACI Dealing Certificate, Banking Regulations Certificate from Malta Financial Services Authority, Project Management Certificate from Chicago State University, and Trade Finance Certificate from TEB (BNP Paribas).

== Career ==
In 1999, he joined Akbank in Turkey. He later joined BNP Paribas Fortis in Malta, where he spent over thirteen years, initially serving as Operations and Treasury Manager and later holding the position of Chief Operating Officer (COO). During this period, he was responsible for intercompany relationships with other BNP Paribas entities within Europe, focusing on IT integration, treasury, banking operations, credits, outsourcing activities, and management of customer relationships.

In addition to his tenure at BNP Paribas Fortis, Çilingir also served on the Malta Bankers’ Association's executive committee, where he coordinated and advocated for sectoral issues and policies affecting banks operating in Malta. He was also a board member of the Financial Markets Association Malta (FMAM).

As of 2023, he was the Chairman of Supervisory Board of European Merchant Bank (headquartered in Vilnius, Lithuania) and is responsible for the bank's strategic oversight, external leadership with regulatory and political relationships and promoting standard of corporate governance.
