= OpenPayd =

Financial services software

- Type: Private
- Industry: Financial technology, Banking as a Service
- Founded: 2018
- Founder: Ozan Özerk
- Headquarters: London, United Kingdom
- Key people: Iana Dimitrova (CEO)
- Services: Payment infrastructure, accounts, virtual IBANs, FX
- Website: www.openpayd.com

OpenPayd is a London-based banking-as-a-service platform, founded in 2018.

== Operations ==
OpenPayd was founded in London in 2018 by Ozan Özerk, the founder of European Merchant Bank, MSB.US, and Ozan SuperApp. It was initially focused on payments and banking for businesses. The company expanded its operations internationally from the UK, opening offices in US, Canada, Malta, Bulgaria, Turkey and France.

In 2020, OpenPayd launched banking and payment services for digital currency businesses, allowing them to access banking and payment networks.

In 2022, OpenPayd began offering Open Banking across the UK and Europe.

Customers include eToro, OKX, B2C2, Bitfinex and Caxton.
