= Société Belge de Banque =

Former Belgian bank

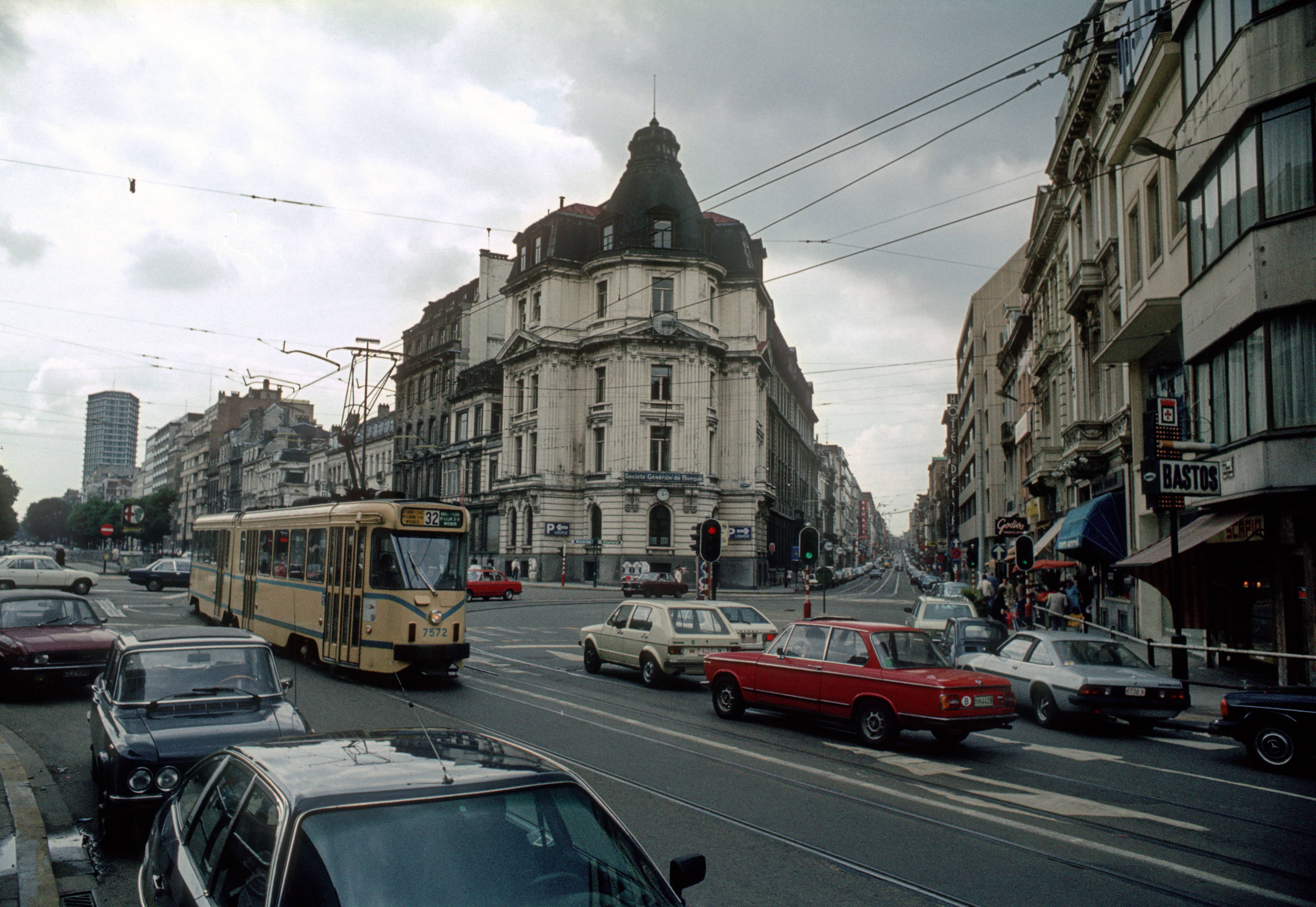
Building at Avenue Louise 61, head office of the SBB from 1931 to 1965, photographed in 1980 as a local branch of the Société Générale de Banque

The Société Belge de Banque (SBB, lit. 'Belgian Banking Company') was a medium-sized Belgian bank, established in 1901 as the Banque Générale Belge (lit. 'General Belgian Bank'), renamed in 1932, and eventually merged in 1965 into the Société Générale de Banque.

== Beginnings ==
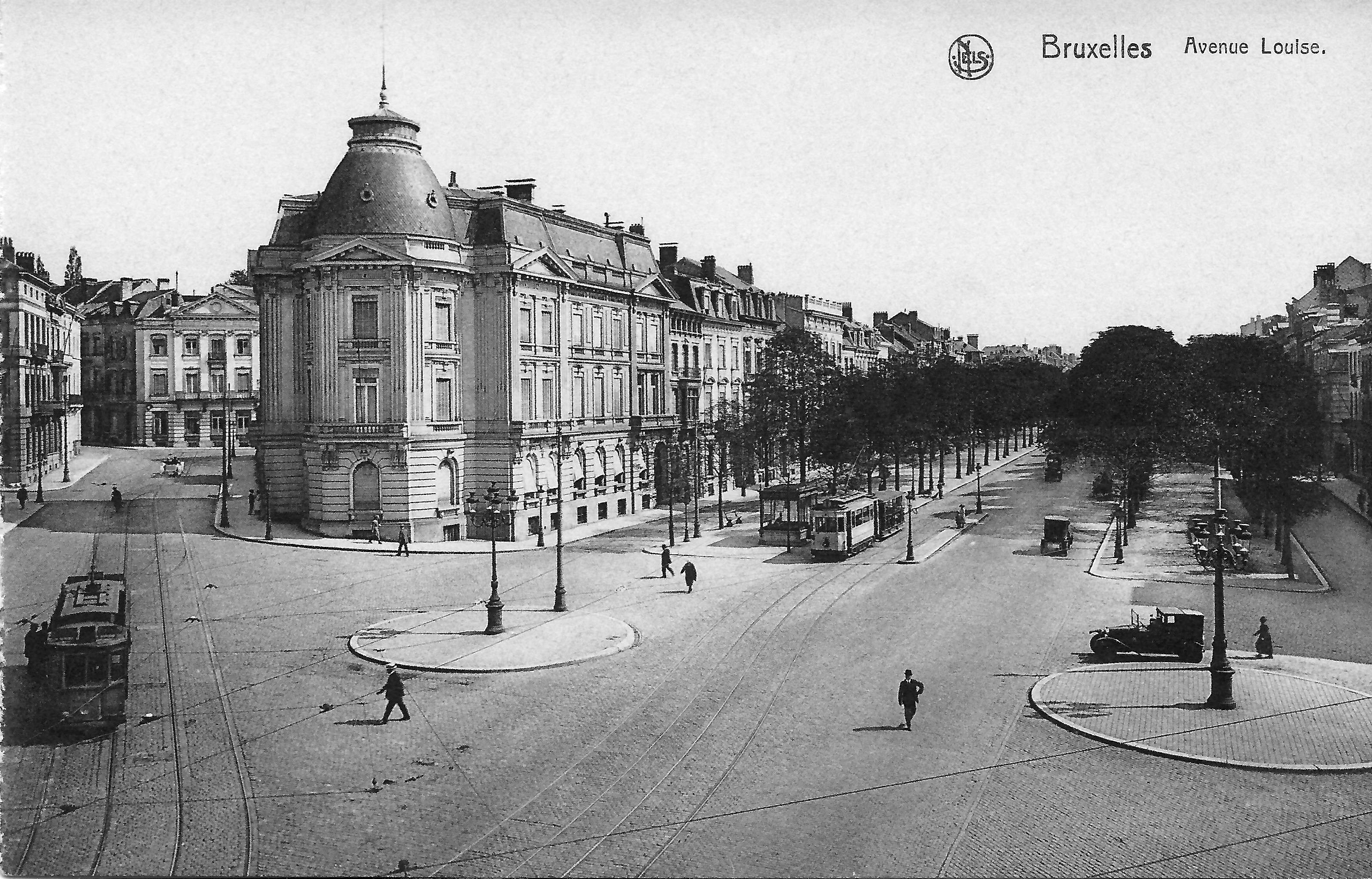
Building at Avenue Louise 54 in Brussels, SBB head office 1928-1931

The Banque Générale Belge (BGB) was established in Namur in 1901, succeeding the partnership (French: société en commandite par actions) named A. de Lhoneux, Linon & Cie, an earlier bank founded in 1859. The BGB had a difficult start but its situation improved so that it received approaches for a merger under the German occupation of Belgium during World War I, including from the Banque de Bruxelles, which however did not materialize.

== Interwar period ==
In 1921, the BGB acquired the Belgian operations of the Bunge company, which at the time was headquartered in Antwerp, and of the Anglo-South American Bank, via an all-shares transaction through which the two institutions became shareholders; on that occasion, its head office relocated to Antwerp. Two further capital increases in 1928 were also supported by the Banque Philippson, the Banque Lambert, the Mutuelle Solvay, and the Compagnie financière et industrielle de Belgique (known as Finabel).

That same year 1928, the BGB again relocated its head office, by moving to a prominent building erected by the Mutuelle Solvay at number 54 of the prestigious Avenue Louise in Brussels. In 1931 the BGB moved to the other side of the avenue, at number 61. That building was eventually demolished in the mid-1980s to be replaced with a postmodern complex designed by the Atelier d'architecture de Genval.

Following financial stress in the late 1920s and early 1930s, the BGB's operations were merged on 21 September 1932 into Finabel, which changed its name to Société Belge de Banque (SBB) while the old BGB was placed into liquidation. On 26 January 1934, the SBB sponsored the creation of the Antwerp Diamond Bank. On 9 December 1935, following new Belgian banking legislation, the SBB transformed itself into a non-bank holding company that was renamed the Compagnie Industrielle de Belgique, while a new banking affiliate was formed under the old name Société Belge de Banque. In 1936, the SBB's branches in Namur and Verviers were taken over by the Banque de Bruxelles. In 1937, the Compagnie Industrielle de Belgique was acquired by the Union Chimique Belge (UCB), which thus became the SBB's controlling shareholder. Subsequently, the UCB sold its controlling interest in the SBB to the Janssen family which controlled the Mutuelle Solvay. By 1939, the Société Belge de Banque kept a branch in Antwerp in addition to the Brussels head office.

== Postwar era ==
In 1946, the SBB acquired the Société Belge de Crédit Industriel et Commercial et de Dépôts, a former Belgian affiliate which France's Crédit Industriel et Commercial had established in 1903. The Solvay Group used the SBB as its home bank from 1948 onwards, but as the latter lacked critical mass, Solvay opted to sell it to the Générale de Banque in 1964. The SBB was formally wound up on 30 November 1965, simultaneously as the Banque d'Anvers.

== See also ==
- Société Générale de Belgique
- List of banks in Belgium
