= CinemaNext =

Belgian cinema exhibition services company

- Company type: Member Company of Ymagis group
- Industry: Digital cinema
- Founded: 8 June 2004 by Laurent Minguet
- Headquarters: Belgium (headquarters), France, Germany, Spain

Previously known as XDC from its creation in 2004 to 2012 until it changed its name to dcinex until it was bought by Ymagis Group in 2014 and was renamed to CinemaNext. It is a cinema exhibition services company based in Liège (in Belgium) but also has offices in 26 other countries including France, Spain and Germany. The principal activities of CinemaNext are the installation and maintenance of digital projectors, sound systems and outfitting for cinemas. They also offer consulting to cinemas about financing and managing their refurbishment projects.

== Digital cinema ==
The digital content lab of XDC prepares digital content for distribution. It creates different sub-titled versions and performs quality control. The company is the first entity to have VPF digital cinema deployment agreements with all the 6 major US studios Warner, Fox, Universal, Paramount, Sony and Disney for a total of 8 thousand digital screens in 22 European countries. Today, XDC has signed VPF deals with exhibitors for about 1,000 screens spread over 11 European countries (Austria, Portugal, Germany, Switzerland, Spain, Belgium, The Netherlands, Hungary, Czech Republic, Slovakia and Poland). XDC has also achieved a global financing of 100 million Euros with Fortis Bank to allow the VPF roll out of 2,000 digital screens in the first phase of its European deployment program.

XDC is also responsible for installing and maintaining the equipment, and training operators. XDC is currently in charge of more than 500 screens in 10 European countries (Sweden, Belgium, The Netherlands, Luxembourg, France, Spain, Germany, Austria, Switzerland and Poland) and its aim is to reach 1500 screens, in order to create the first European digital cinema network.

== Distribution of alternative content ==
In December 2007, XDC has signed an agreement with Qubo and Dynamic to create DDcinema, a company dedicated to the distribution of digital cinema alternative content (mainly lyrical operas).

== See also ==
- Digital cinema
