= BGL BNP Paribas =

Luxembourg subsidiary of the BNP Paribas Group

Expansion of BGL BNP Paribas head office completed 2016 near Luxexpo, Luxembourg

BGL BNP Paribas (formerly Banque Générale du Luxembourg or BGL) is the subsidiary of BNP Paribas in Luxembourg, which roots going back to the Banque Générale du Luxembourg (BGL) founded in 1919 by mostly Belgian stakeholders. Part of the BNP Paribas Group since May 2009, it was the second-largest bank in Luxembourg by total assets as of end-2023 (at €52.7 billion), behind the state-owned Banque et Caisse d'Épargne de l'État.

In 2011, BGL BNP Paribas had been the second-largest private-sector employer in the country, behind ArcelorMittal. In 2014, BGL BNP Paribas was ranked by The Banker magazine as the top bank in Luxembourg based on tier 1 capital.

== History ==
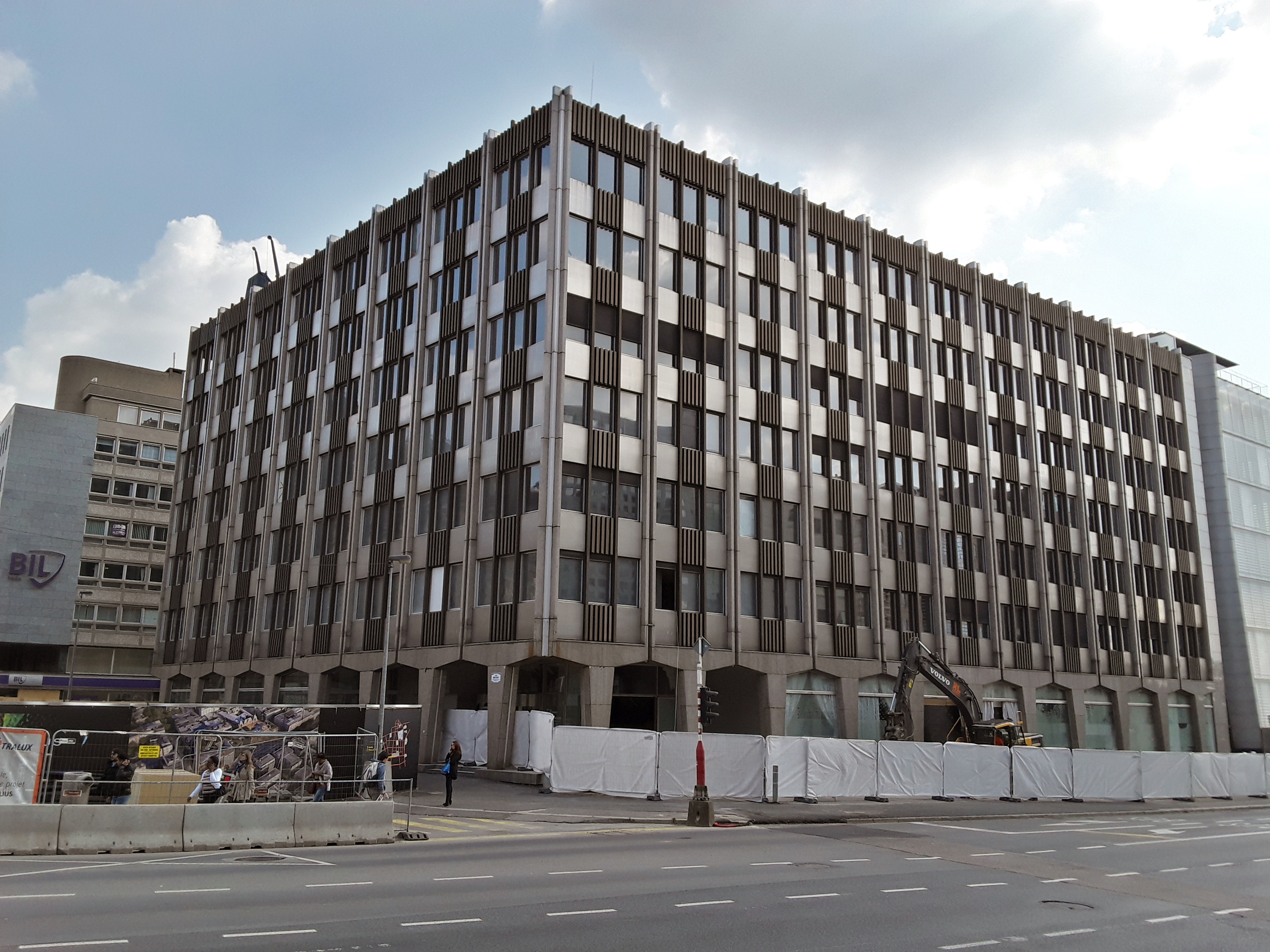
Former BGL head office at the corner of Boulevard Royal and Avenue Monterey, Luxembourg, photographed in 2016 before reconstruction as part of the Royal-Hamilius development

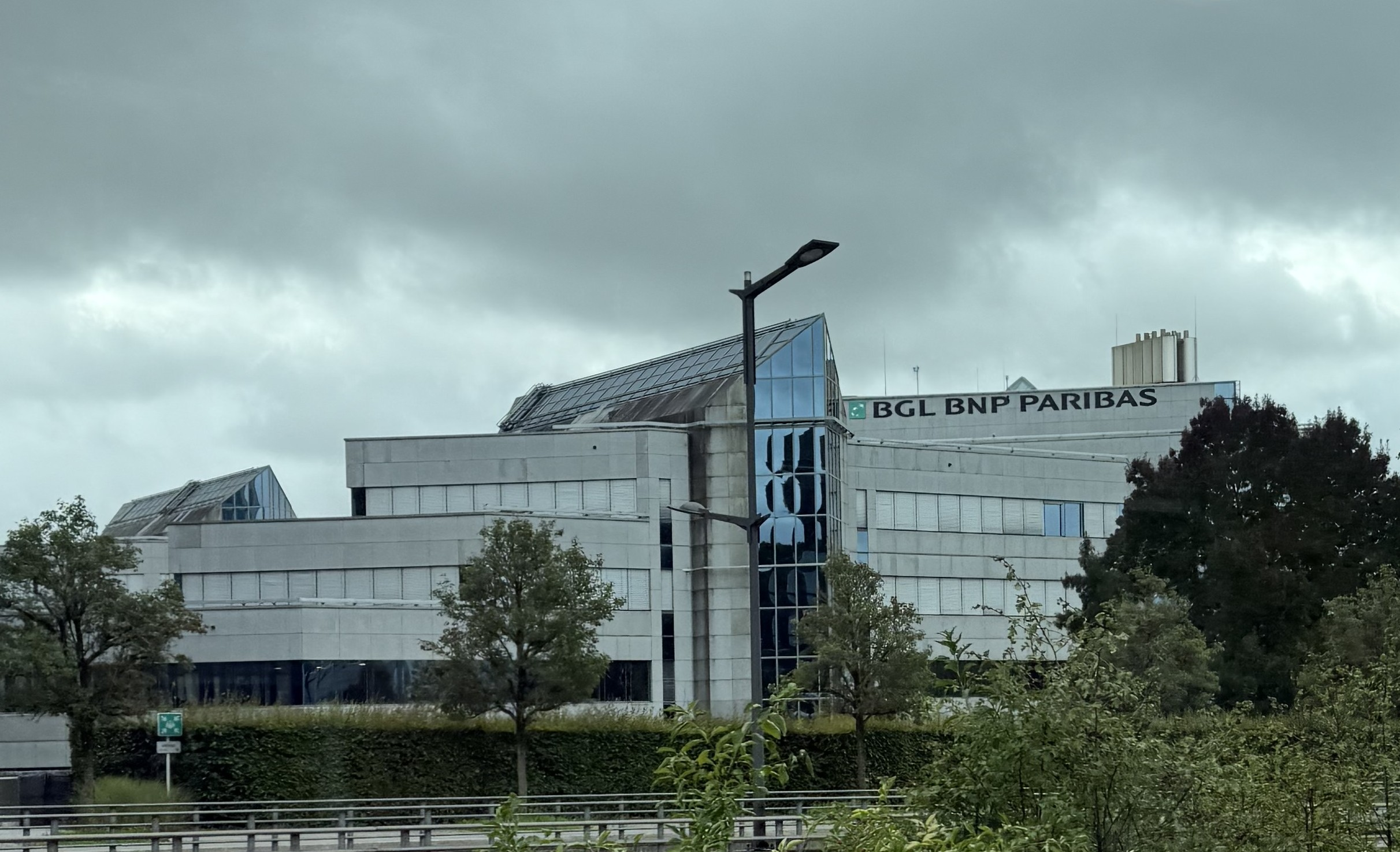
BGL office complex on Avenue John F. Kennedy, Kirchberg, Luxembourg, where the bank relocated its registered office in November 1995

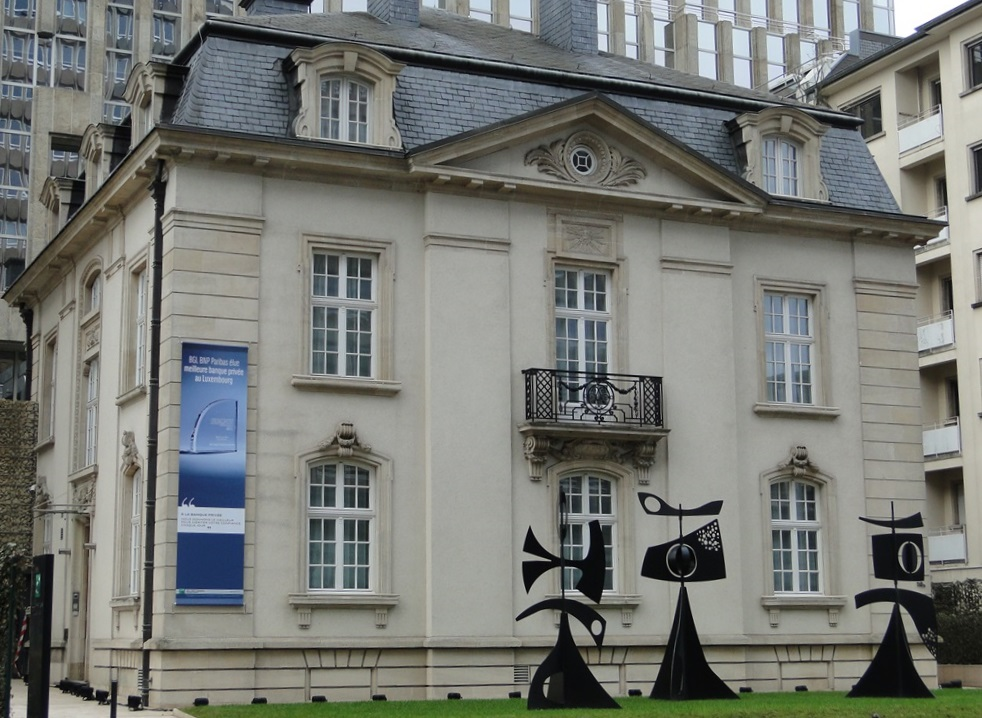
Villa Lamort (built 1925) at 10A, Boulevard Royal in Luxembourg City, home of Paribas then of BNP Paribas in Luxembourg before the BGL acquisition; repurposed in 2012 as downtown private banking branch of BGL BNP Paribas

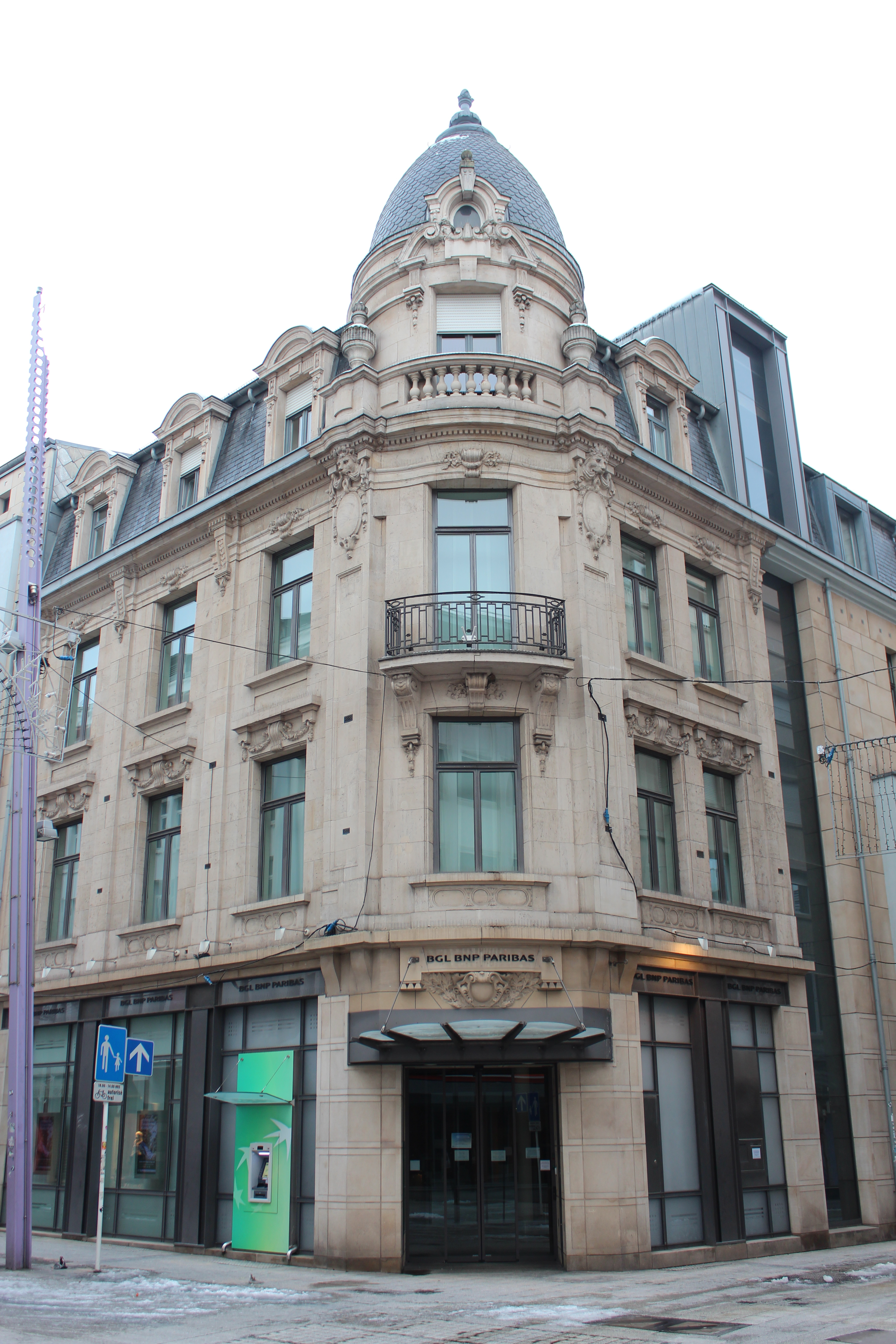
BGL BNP Paribas branch in Esch-sur-Alzette

=== Banque Générale du Luxembourg ===
The BGL was founded on 29 September 1919, the day after the 1919 Luxembourg referendum which stabilized the country's political prospects, as a Belgian entity registered in Arlon in Belgian Luxembourg but with operational head office in Luxembourg City. The initiative was led by the Société Générale de Belgique (SGB), together with Luxembourgish and Belgian partners. The main office soon moved into new premises at 14, rue Aldringen near the intersection of downtown Boulevard Royal and Avenue Monterey. By 1928, it had become a large regional bank extending its operations to the neighbouring areas of Belgium and France, including Metz and Thionville. In 1934, the SGB transferred its controlling stake in BGL to its newly formed affiliate the Banque de la Société Générale de Belgique (or SGB Bank). In 1935, the BGL's registered office was relocated from Belgium to Luxembourg, even though the SGB remained as its major shareholder.

With the integration of Luxembourg into Nazi Germany during World War II, the banking sector was disrupted and brought into service of the new rule. The SGB Bank, which by then held 50 percent of BGL's equity capital, was expropriated and the stake was taken over by Deutsche Bank. That change was reversed after the end of German occupation.

In the 1960s, BGL became a player in international financial services with cross-border transactions accounting for an increasing share of its operations. In the late 1970s, it entered the eurobond market, opening offices in Milan (1979-2001), Hong Kong (1980-2001), Mexico City (1979-1987) and Frankfurt and establishing a Swiss subsidiary, Banque Générale du Luxembourg (Suisse) SA, in Zurich (1982-2010). On 29 November 1984, BGL shares were first traded on the Luxembourg Stock Exchange. In 1995, the BGL's registered office relocated from the historical premises at rue Aldringen (which had been rebuilt in the meantime in the International Style) to a new campus at the northeastern end of the new development of Kirchberg. By 1999, BGL was acting as a commercial bank for its Luxembourg customers as well as an investment bank offering financial services to the international community.

=== Integration into Fortis Group ===
In 1999, Fortis Group acquired the former SGB Bank, by then known as the Générale de Banque, including the 53-percent stake it held in BGL. In early 2000, Fortis initiated a public exchange offer, at the end of which Fortis's stake rose to 97.7 percent; a squeeze-out bringing it to 100 percent was then completed in March 2000.

Fortis subsequently used BGL as a vehicle for business expansion into the surrounding region, including by opening a business centre in Trier-Saarbrücken in 2002. In 2005, the historical name BGL was phased out as the bank was rebranded as Fortis Bank Luxembourg.

=== Integration into BNP Paribas ===
In late September 2008 as Fortis Group was vacillating, the Luxembourg government injected €2.5 billion into Fortis Bank Luxembourg in the form of a convertible loan. In October, the Belgian and Luxembourg governments agreed that BNP Paribas would take over the bank. In December 2008, the government loan was converted into equity, by which Luxembourg owned 49.9 percent of the bank's shares; the bank's name change was reversed to BGL. In May 2009, the takeover was completed with BNP Paribas holding 65.96 percent of BGL equity, while Luxembourg still held 34 percent. On 21 September 2009, the bank's registered name was changed to BGL BNP Paribas. In the course of 2010, BGL BNP Paribas absorbed BNP Paribas Luxembourg, the pre-existing Luxembourg subsidiary of BNP Paribas, itself the product of a 2000 merger between the respective Luxembourg subsidiaries of BNP and Paribas, the latter of which had been created in 1964.

== Recent developments ==
In 2018, BGL BNP Paribas acquired the Luxembourg subsidiary of ABN AMRO. During the beginning of 2019, the Private Banking sector has been separated and it is now independent.

== See also ==
- BGL Luxembourg Open, a Luxembourg tennis tournament organised from 1991 to 2021
- BGL Ligue, the highest point of Luxembourgish Football, being named that since the 2008-09 season.
- BGL: L'histoire d'un siècle. A virtual exhibition on the history of the bank.
- List of banks in Luxembourg
