= Biip.no =

Norwegian social network

- Website type: Social network service
- Headquarters: Norway
- Founder: Erling Løken Andersen; Bo Myrås; Ozan Özerk
- Website: www.biip.no
- Launched: June 1, 2005; 21 years ago
- Current status: Inactive

Biip.no was a social networking service based in Norway.

Users could use the site to send free SMS messages. As of February 2012, about one million text messages were sent from the site each month. The site described itself as "Norway's largest community for teens".

== History ==
The site was founded on June 1, 2005, by Erling Løken Andersen, Bo Myrås and Ozan Özerk. It was created under the media company Norsk Ideutvikling.

In 2008, TV 2 and Egmont Group acquired a majority stake for NOK 76 million.
