= Générale de Banque =

Former Belgian bank

Générale de Banque Generale Bank
- Logo after 1985 rebranding

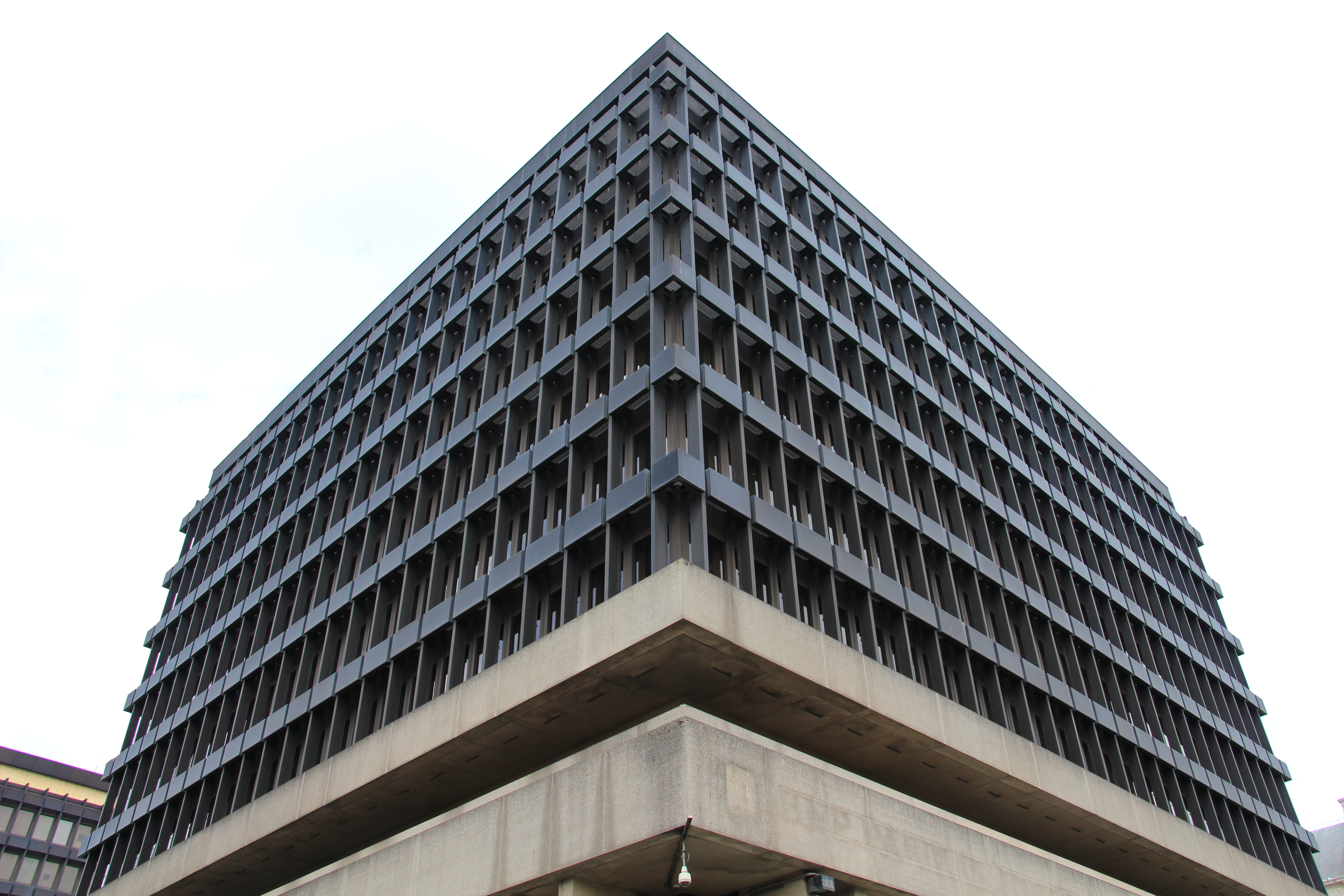
- Head office of Generale Bank in Brussels, before demolition in 2016
- Industry: financial service activities, except insurance and pension funding
- Predecessor: Société Générale de Belgique
- Founded: 1934
- Defunct: 1999
- Headquarters: Belgium
- Products: Banking

The Générale de Banque (Dutch: Generale Bank) was a major Belgian bank, created in 1934 as a spin-off from the powerful financial conglomerate Société Générale de Belgique (SGB) in compliance with new Belgian legislation that mandated separation of commercial banking activities from investment holdings. It was initially named the Banque de la Société Générale de Belgique (referred to inside Belgium simply as the Banque de la Société Générale), then from 1965 to 1985 the Société Générale de Banque (Dutch: Generale Bankmaatschappij).

Upon establishment, it was the dominant bank in Belgium, with one-third of total banking assets, not counting other SGB-linked banking entities such as the Banque d'Anvers and the Banque Italo-Belge.

In 1999, the Générale de Banque merged into Fortis Group, which itself became BNP Paribas Fortis following acquisition by BNP Paribas in 2008.

== History ==
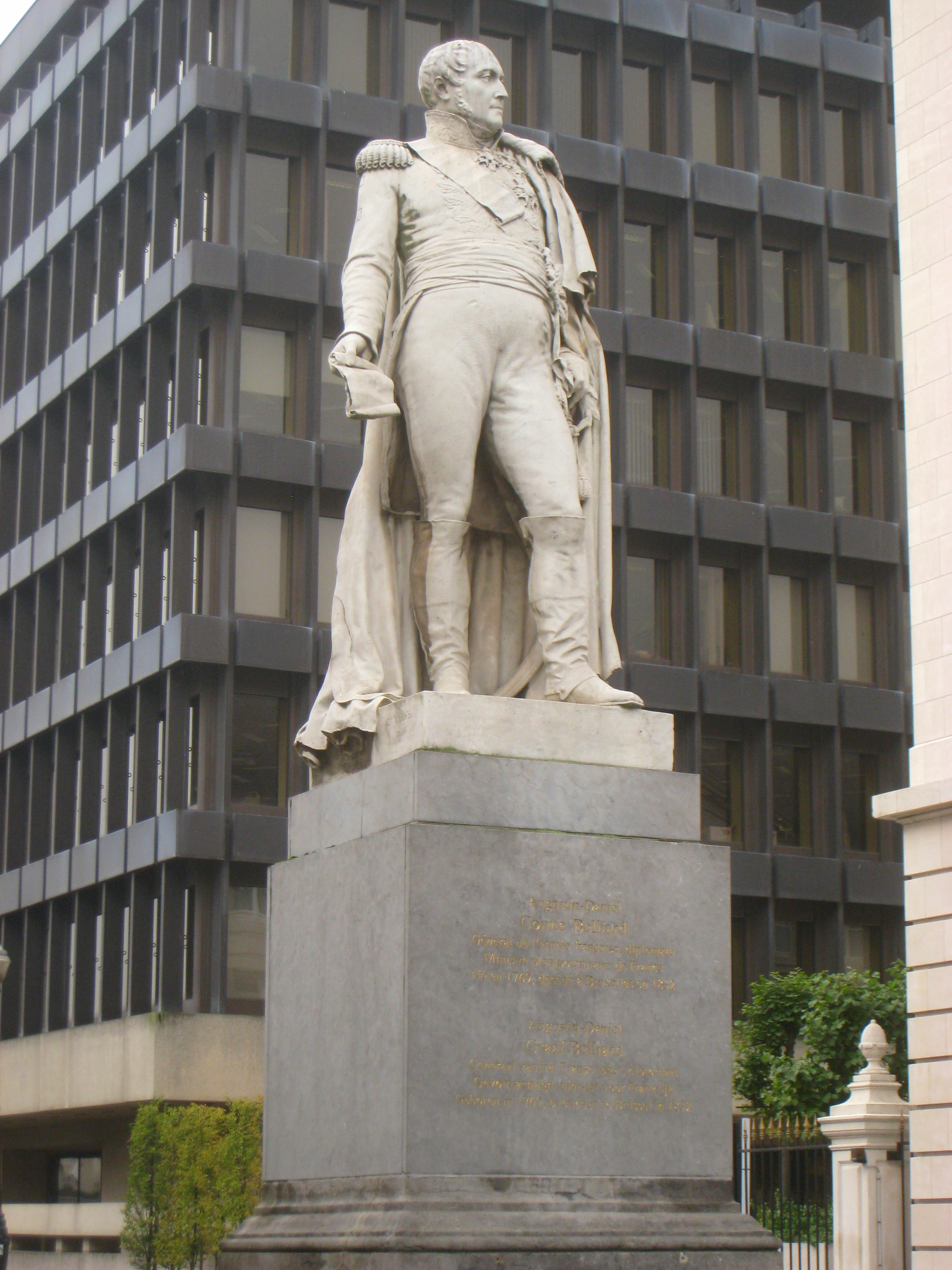
Statue of Augustin Daniel Belliard in front of the Générale de Banque's head office, photographed in 2010

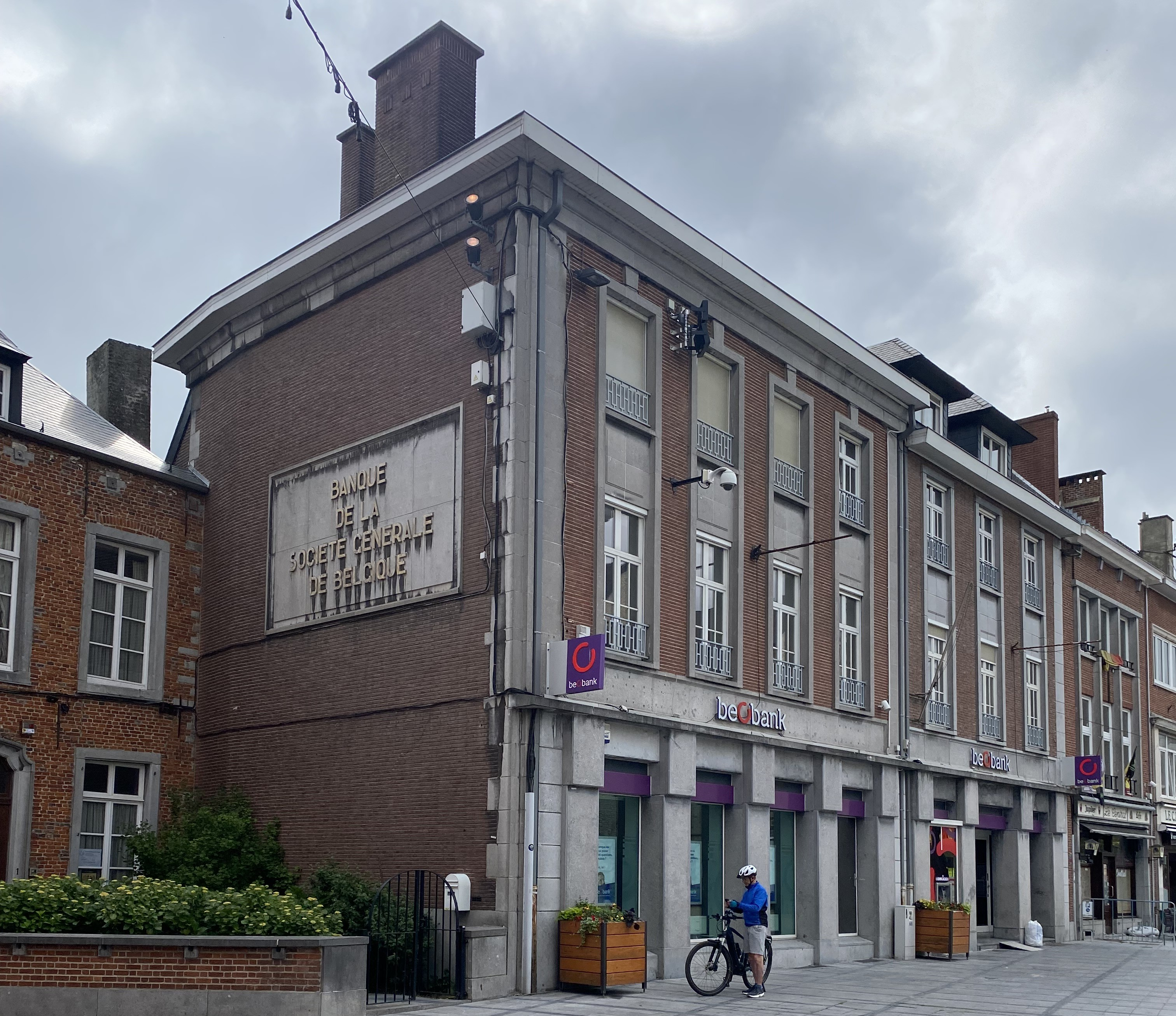
Former branch of the Banque de la Société Générale in Nivelles

Upon establishment on 5 December 1934, the Banque de la Société Générale (BSG) was by far the largest bank in Belgium (followed by the Banque de Bruxelles), with a total 347 branches and offices. It brought together the SGB's banking division and 12 affiliated local banks: the Banque Centrale de la Dendre, Banque Centrale de la Dyle et du Limbourg, Banque Centrale de la Sambre, Banque Centrale de Namur et de la Meuse, Banque Centrale Tournaisienne, Banque de Courtrai et de la Flandre Occidentale, Banque de Flandre et de Gand, Banque de Verviers, Banque Générale de Liège et de Huy, Banque Générale du Centre, Banque du Hainaut, and Banque Générale du Luxembourg. The new bank's capital was divided equally between the SGB and the shareholders of the 12 merged banks; as the latter were also part-owned by the SGB, the SGB owned 74.4 percent of the BSG at inception.

The BSG coexisted with other banking entities that the SGB retained as subsidiaries and affiliates, principally the Banque d'Anvers in the trading city of Antwerp, the Banque Belge pour l'Étranger in Asia and the Middle East, the Banque du Congo Belge and its affiliate Banque Commerciale du Congo in Belgium's African colonies, the Banque Italo-Belge in South America, as well as the Banque de l'Union Parisienne in France. In the 1930s, the BSG itself held shares in all these banks (except the BUP) and also in the Société Nationale de Crédit à l'Industrie.

In 1945, the SGB's stake in the BSG had fallen to 50 percent; by 1954, it had further decreased to 24 percent. Meanwhile, the bank's activities expanded rapidly in the postwar period, both in Belgium and abroad with new subsidiaries in Tangier, Beirut, Geneva, and New York. The BSG also established a cooperation network, the European Advisory Committee, together with Amsterdamsche Bank, Deutsche Bank, and Midland Bank.

In 1965, the Banque d'Anvers and the Société Belge de Banque were both merged into the BSG, generating significant synergies. On that occasion, the bank's name was changed to Société Générale de Banque (Dutch: Generale Bankmaatschappij); the SGB's stake was further diluted to 20.7 percent. The Société Générale de Banque held 40 percent of all deposits in Belgium. The bank subsequently further expanded into retail banking services: its Belgian branch network grew from 328 in 1945 to 640 in 1964 and 1,100 in 1975. In 1985, its name was further abbreviated to Générale de Banque (Dutch: Generale Bank).

In May 1987, the Générale de Banque was approached by AMRO Bank, whose board chairman Roelof Nelissen had a longstanding rapport with Générale de Banque's chairman of the executive committee, Eric de Villegas de Clercamp. Both banks had powerful positions in their respective home markets, but lacked scale abroad. With ongoing European integration, the combination promised greater strength with a balance sheet total of 250 billion guilders that would have made it the fourth-largest bank in Europe. They were not aligned on growth strategy, however, as the Générale de Banque focused on Europe while AMRO Bank had global aspirations. As a consequence of these differences and divergences between shareholders, the secret merger talks progressed slowly. In January 1988, Carlo De Benedetti made a hostile bid for the Société Générale de Belgique, accelerating the merger discussion. On 12 February 1988, Générale de Banque and AMRO Bank signed a cooperation agreement aiming at a merger within three years. The first step was the creation of a joint holding company under the name Tuba Holding International. But as Villegas de Clercamp left the bank, the alliance project lost an important champion, and his successor Paul-Emmanuel Janssen was more reluctant. In the summer of 1989, after a year and a half of talks, AMRO Bank lost confidence in a good outcome, and in September 1989 a press conference ended the alliance.

In 1995, the Générale de Banque gained a foothold of its own in the Netherlands by acquiring Crédit Lyonnais Bank Nederland (CLBN), which had 79 branches, leaving out some bad assets that were retained by Crédit Lyonnais. Fortis Bank had also attempted to buy CLBN. By end-1997, following acquisition in 1993 of a block of shares from AG Insurance, the SGB's stake in Générale de Banque had risen to 29.7 percent,

== Mergers into Fortis and BNP Paribas ==
In 1998, the bank's major shareholder, Société Générale de Belgique, which had been acquired by Compagnie de Suez in 1998, indicated that it wanted to sell its controlling interest in the bank. Fortis's Maurice Lippens had good relations with Suez's top executive, Gérard Mestrallet, and quickly reached an agreement. In May 1998, after months of difficult negotiations and with the reluctance of the bank's executive committee, Fortis made an offer of 22 billion guilders in shares. ABN AMRO made a counteroffer of 24 billion shortly thereafter. Beforehand, ABN AMRO had held extensive discussions with the executive committee of Generale Bank, and the latter was to manage the combination's European banks. The management would be in the hands of Rijkman Groenink (ABN AMRO) and Fred Chaffart of Generale Bank would become vice chairman, but the executive committee had a minority in the board of directors, comparable to the board of directors and supervisory board in the Netherlands. After Fortis increased its bid to some 28 billion guilders, the majority of the board of directors of Generale Bank voted in favor of Fortis' bid. In 1998, the purchase was completed. On June 23, 1999, all the Fortis banking companies merged, but the merger was not seen on the streets until March 21, 2000, when the name Fortis Bank was henceforth used.

Fortis Bank was created in 1999 from the merger of Générale de Banque and ASLK / CGER in Belgium, and Generale Bank Nederland, VSB Bank and MeesPierson in the Netherlands. During the credit crisis, parent company Fortis ran into major financial problems by stalling in its acquisition of ABN AMRO Bank N.V., eventually resulting in a nationalization of itself and the newly acquired parts from the ABN AMRO estate. The group's banking activities were split into a Belgian and Dutch part. The Belgian operations initially came into the hands of the Belgian state. Since 2009, it has been part of the French bank BNP Paribas and continues under the name BNP Paribas Fortis.

== Head office ==
Upon creation in 1934, the bank took up the SGB's storied address at 3 rue Montagne du Parc in Brussels, while the SGB itself relocated uphill on the same block, facing Rue Royale. In 1966, the SGB and Société Générale de Banque decided to demolish and rebuild the entire block. While the SGB had its new head office on Rue Royale re-erected on a neoclassical design, the bank opted for a contrasting style with a brutalist design by Hugo Van Kuyck, Pierre Guillissen, Christian Housiaux and Jean Polak, implemented in two phases from 1968 to 1980.

The Générale de Bank complex was in turn demolished in 2016-2017 to make way for a new head office building of BNP Paribas Fortis, designed by Jaspers-Eyers Architects and completed in late 2021.

== Leadership ==
Period	President of the executive committee
1934 - 1939	Alexandre Galopin
1939 - 1944	Willy de Munck
1944 - 1950	Jules Bagage
1951 - 1963	Pierre de Bonvoisin
1963 - 1969	Jules Dubois-Pélerin
1969 - 1976	Robert Henrion
1977 - 1979	André Rostenne
1980 - 1988	Eric de Villegas de Clercamp
1989 - 1991	Paul-Emmanuel Janssen
1992 - 1999	Fred Chaffart

Period	President
1980 - 1991	Jacques Groothaert
1991 - 1999	Paul-Emmanuel Janssen

== Sponsorship ==
From 1981 to 2000 the bank was the title sponsor of the R.S.C. Anderlecht.

== See also ==
- KBC Group
- Banque Lambert
- List of banks in Belgium
