= BNP Paribas Fortis =

International bank based in Belgium

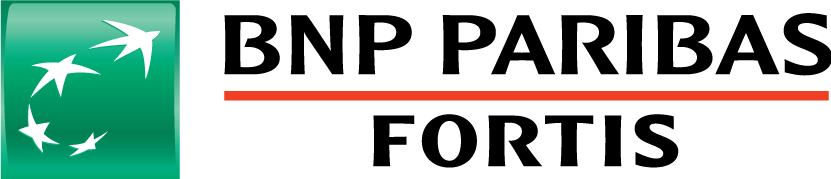

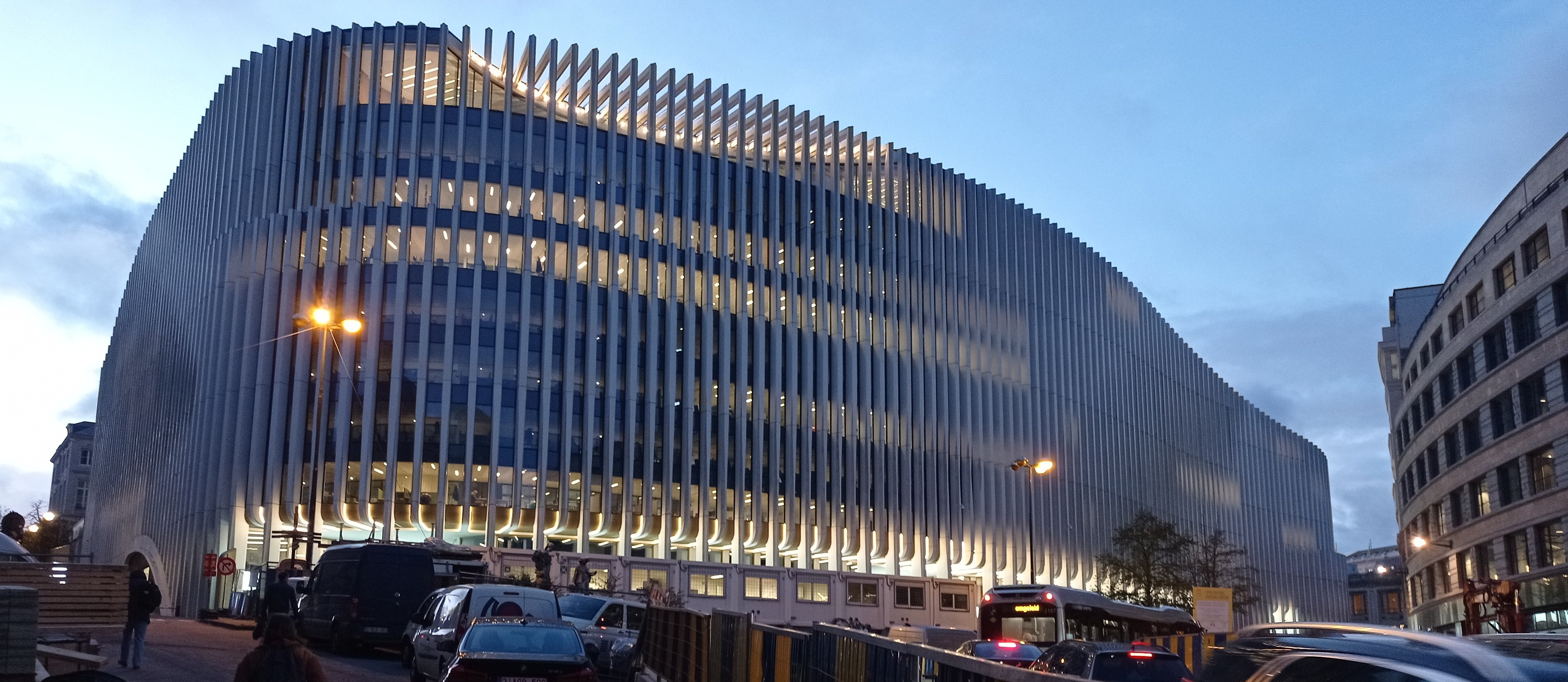
- Head office on Rue Montagne du Parc/Warandeberg, Brussels
- Company type: Subsidiary
- Industry: Financial services
- Founded: 2009
- Headquarters: Brussels, Belgium
- Key people: Michael Anseeuw, CEO
- Number of employees: 37,000, of which 18.000 in Belgium
- Parent: BNP Paribas
- Website: www.bnpparibasfortis.be

BNP Paribas Fortis is an international bank based in Belgium and a subsidiary of French banking group BNP Paribas. The bank was created in May 2009 after BNP Paribas acquired 75% of the Belgian Fortis Bank from the Federal Participation and Investment Company. It was formerly, together with Fortis Bank Nederland, the banking arm of the financial institution Fortis. After the ultimately unsuccessful ABN-AMRO takeover, the subprime mortgage crisis and subsequent 2008 financial crisis led to the sale of the Dutch and Luxembourg parts of the banking branch to the Dutch and Luxembourg governments. Fortis Bank itself was first partly bought by the Belgian government (for €4.7 billion), then fully purchased by the government and sold to BNP Paribas.

== Activities ==
BNP Paribas Fortis offers the Belgian market a comprehensive range of financial services a range of client types, including individual customers, self-employed people and those in the liberal professions, small and medium-sized companies, local businesses, corporate clients and non-profit organisations. In the insurance sector, BNP Paribas Fortis works closely, as a tied agent, with Belgian insurance company AG Insurance.

BNP Paribas Fortis is the number-one bank for retail customers in Belgium in terms of market share and it has a strong market position among professionals and small businesses. BNP Paribas Fortis is also the leading private bank in Belgium. It ranks number one in corporate banking, offering a full range of financial services to corporate clients, public-sector entities and local authorities. Outside Belgium the bank supports via BNP Paribas group’s international network of branches across 63 countries. The commercial organisation of the bank comprises the entities Retail Banking, Affluent & Private Banking and Corporate Banking:

- Retail Banking serves individual customers, self-employed people and small businesses with a multi-disciplinary team;
- Affluent & Private Banking serves individuals with more than 85,000 euros of assets, along with self-employed people and firms in the liberal professions, through dedicated relationship managers. Private Banking services are aimed at individual customers with invested assets of more than 250,000 euros. Within Private Banking, the Wealth Management department caters to customers with invested assets of more than 5 million euros.
- Corporate Banking serves businesses with more complex needs through dedicated relationship managers. The Enterprises business line serves small and medium-sized businesses while Corporate Coverage handles large corporations, public-sector entities and institutional clients. The range of services offered includes flow banking products, specialised financial expertise, securities, insurance products, real estate services, trade finance, cash management, factoring and leasing. In addition, BNP Paribas Fortis is also active in mergers and acquisitions and on the capital market.

In 2022, BNP Paribas Fortis became a 100% shareholder of bpost bank after the acquisition of the 50% stake held by bpost. An exclusive seven-year commercial agreement was also signed between bpost and BNP Paribas Fortis. As part of this agreement, bpost offers BNP Paribas Fortis services and products in its network of post offices. On 22 January 2024, bpost bank was integrated into BNP Paribas Fortis and bpost bank customers joined BNP Paribas Fortis. The bpost bank brand disappeared from post offices and was replaced by the BNP Paribas Fortis brand and logo.

BNP Paribas Fortis is a 25% shareholder of Batopin (Belgian ATM Optimisation Initiative), a Belgian company that was established jointly by BNP Paribas Fortis, KBC, Belfius and ING Belgium on 10 March 2020. The company manages an ATM park for the four participating banks under the neutral brand name Bancontact CASH, independent of the shareholders.

== Governance ==
Max Jadot is Chairman of the Board of Directors of BNP Paribas Fortis. The CEO is Michael Anseeuw.

== Subsidiaries ==
BNP Paribas Fortis is the majority shareholder of BGL BNP Paribas, which operates in the Luxembourg market. It is the largest provider of banking services to small and medium-sized enterprises in Luxembourg and the number two in financial services to individuals. BGL BNP Paribas is also leader in banking insurance with a package of insurance services.

In Turkey, BNP Paribas Fortis operates through TEB (Türk Ekonomi Bankası), in which it has a stake of 48,7%. TEB has 448 offices and employs 8,700 staff. These serve 8.1 million private customers and about 500,000 business customers.

BNP Paribas Fortis is 100% shareholder of leasing company Arval BNP Paribas, an important player in the long-term rental of vehicles and a specialist in mobility solutions. Arval offers its business customers (from large multinationals to small and medium-sized enterprises), its partners and their employees and also private individuals services tailored to their movements. By the end of 2023, Arval had about 8,400 employees in the 29 countries where the company is based and leased almost 1.7 million vehicles to its 300,000 customers.

The quality of the services offered by BNP Paribas Fortis to its customers was awarded several times. In 2023, the bank was elected "Best bank for digital solutions in Belgium" by Euromoney, "Bank of the Year in Belgium" by The Banker, "Best private bank in Belgium" by PWM-The Banker and "Best bank in Belgium" by Global Finance. At the Euromoney Awards for Excellence 2024 BNP Paribas Fortis was named Best Bank, Best Investment Bank and Best Bank for ESG in Belgium.

== History ==
BNP Paribas Fortis originates in Belgian banks that were merged in the past and merged within the Fortis Group. The roots of the bank go back to 1822, when William I of the Netherlands founded the Algemeene Nederlandsche Maatschappij ter Begunstiging van de Volksvlijt.

The banks that merged into BNP Paribas Fortis today are among others:

- 1822: King William I of the Netherlands establishes in Brussels the Algemeene Nederlandsche Maatschappij ter Befavour van de Volksvlijt, the forerunner of the Société Générale of Belgium (Société Générale) and Generale Bank.
- 1865: creation of the General Savings and Loan Fund (ASLK / CGER), which will merge with Generale Bank in the 1990s.
- 1919: establishment of the National Society for Credit to Industry (NMKN), which is acquired by ASLK in 1995.
- 1999: creation of Fortis Bank; the bank arises from the merger of Generale Bank and ASLK in Belgium, and three other banks in the Netherlands (Generale Bank, VSB Bank, Mees Pierson).
- After the 2008 financial crisis, Fortis Bank's banking activities in the Netherlands are sold to the Dutch State. In Belgium, the State becomes a 99.93% shareholder of Fortis Bank.
- In 2009, BNP Paribas acquired 75% of Fortis Bank in Belgium, while the Belgian State acquired 10.3% of BNP Paribas' shares.
- In 2013, the company name BNP Paribas Fortis becomes the bank's trading name.
- In November of the same year, BNP Paribas took over the remaining 25% stake in BNP Paribas Fortis which was still held by the Belgian State, for 3.25 billion euros.

== See also ==
- List of banks in Belgium
- List of investors in Bernard L. Madoff Securities
