= European Merchant Bank =

Lithuanian digital neobank

EMBank European Merchant Bank
- Type: Private company
- Industry: Financial services
- Founded: 14 December 2018; 7 years ago in Vilnius
- Headquarters: Vilnius, Lithuania
- Key people: Sarp Demiray (CEO); Ekmel Cilingir (Chairman of Supervisory Board)
- Products: Commercial banking, fintech
- Website: em.bank

The European Merchant Bank (trading as EMBank) is a Lithuanian digital neobank established in 2018. The bank focuses on small and medium-sized enterprises (SMEs) in the fintech space.

== History ==
EMBank was founded in 2018 in Lithuania. On 14 December 2018, "the bank received a banking license from the European Central Bank."

By the end of 2021, the institution's business loans reached €29.7 million. That same year, EMBank managed to break even.

In 2022, the institution faced a trademark dispute with mBank and the European Union Intellectual Property Office regarding its name. In April 2026, the Bank of Lithuania fined EMBank €270,000 for anti-money laundering, counter-terrorist financing and sanctions-control shortcomings, and temporarily barred the bank from accepting new higher-risk clients or servicing existing ones from higher-risk third countries.

== Features ==
The bank offers a number of financial products and services:

- "Direct access to banking services for both fintech and SMEs business."
- The institution provides "banking as a service (BaaS)" and maintains "a single Embedded Finance API to Fintechs."
- Lending facilities for SMEs.
- SEPA payment services.

== Membership and activities ==
The bank maintains membership in the Lithuanian Banking Association since its establishment and participates in FinTech Hub LT and Fintech LT associations.

EMBank collaborates with Mastercard.

The organization participates regularly in specialized conferences including "Money2020" and "Finovate."

== See also ==
- List of banks in Lithuania
