= Banque d'Anvers =

Former Belgian bank

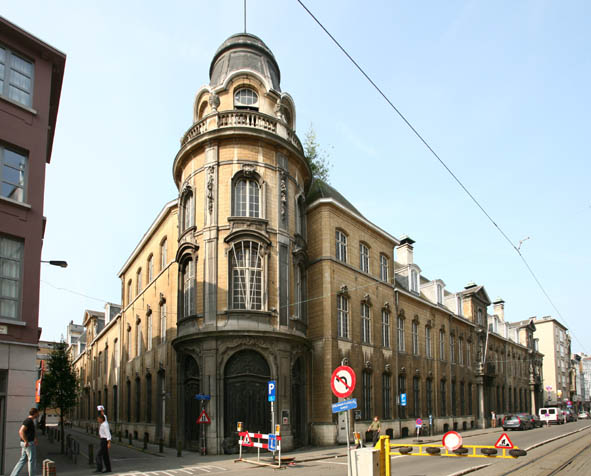
- Building at Lange Nieuwstraat 20-24, Antwarp, head office of the Banque d'Anvers from 1829 to 1920
- Type: Branch
- Industry: Financial services
- Predecessor: Société Générale de Belgique
- Founded: 1823
- Defunct: 1965
- Fate: Merged
- Successor: Générale de Banque
- Headquarters: Antwerp, Belgium
- Products: Banking services

The Banque d'Anvers (lit. 'Bank of Antwerp') was a Belgian based bank that acted as the affiliate of the Société Générale de Belgique in Antwerp. It started activity as a branch in 1823, became a fully-fledged bank in 1827, and was eventually merged into the Générale de Banque in 1965. In the 1920s, it was described as one of the most powerful banks in Belgium.

== Name ==
Even though the bank was primarily active in the Dutch-speaking part of Belgium, for most of its existence it was generally referred to by its French name including in Dutch-speaking or English-speaking contexts.

== History ==
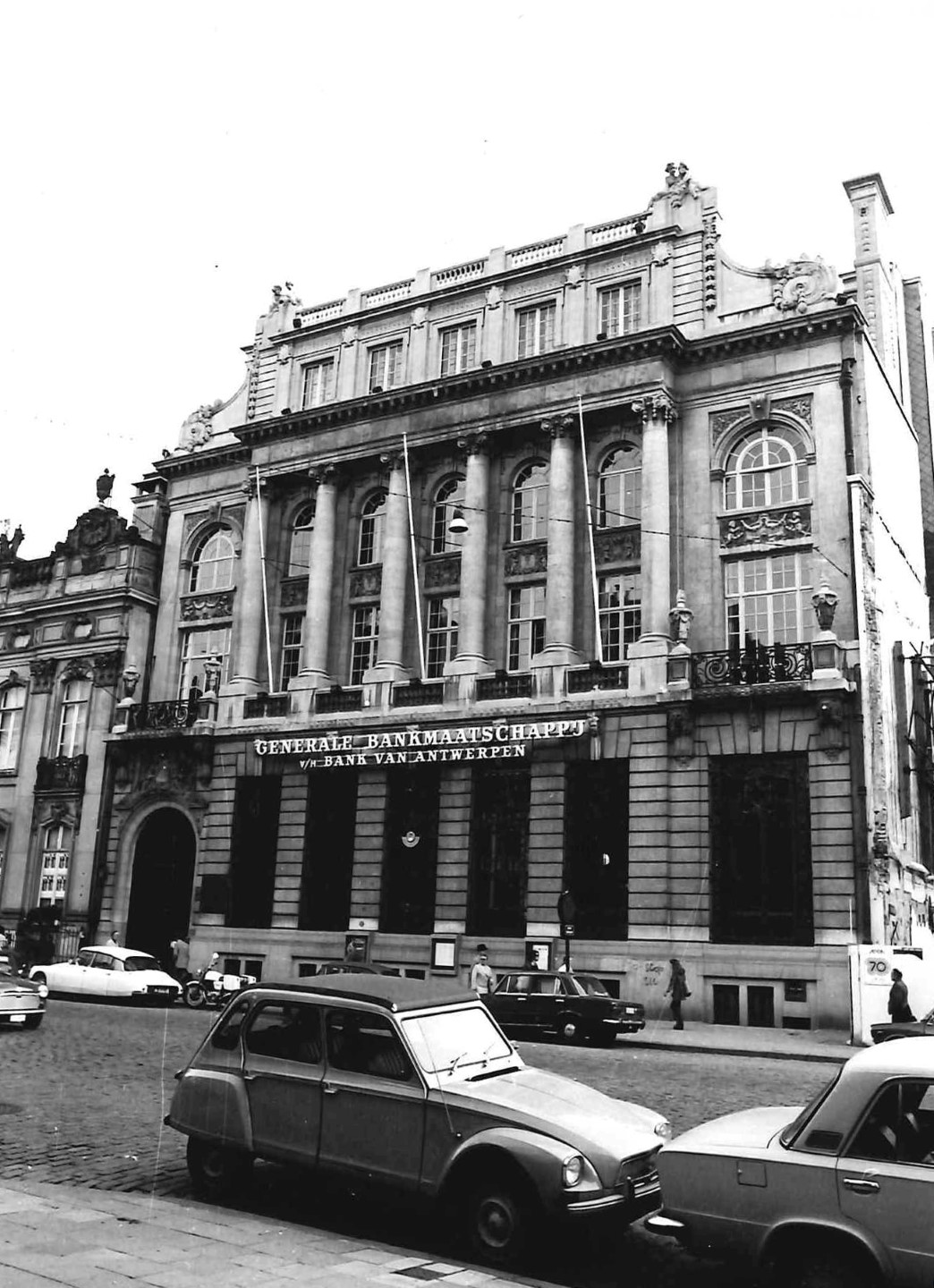
Former head office of the Banque de Reports, the Fonds Publics et de Dépôts on Meir 48, Antwerp, designed by architect Émile Thielens in 1906 and completed in 1908, later used as head office by the Banque d'Anvers from 1920 to 1965; photographed in 1975 with sign hinting at its former name

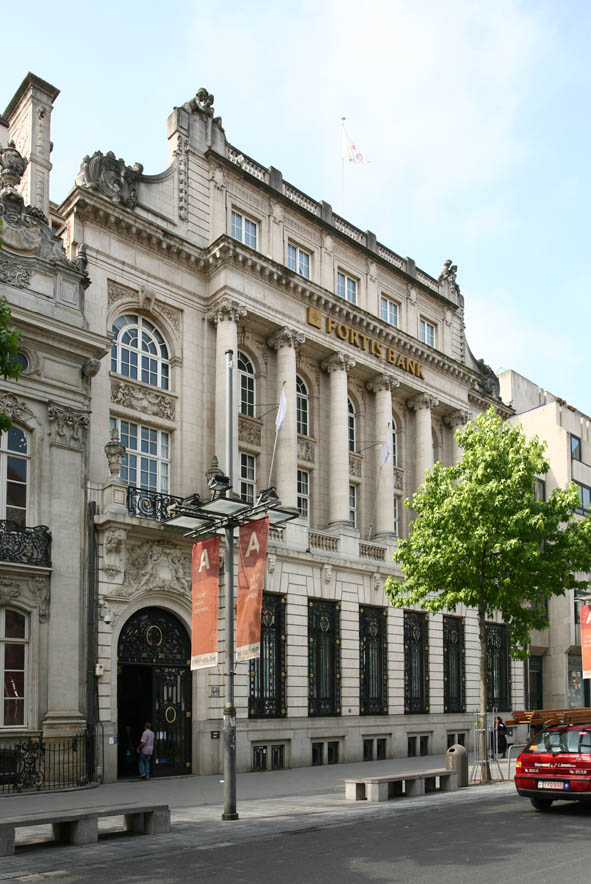
The same building in 2007

One year after its establishment in 1822, the Société Générale de Belgique (at that time known as the Algemeene Nederlandsche Maatschappij) opened a branch in Antwerp. A few years later, it decided to convert it into a legally separate bank (subsidiary), which became effective on 1 January 1827. At the time, the Algemeene Nederlandsche Maatschappij was a note-issuing bank, and issued special banknotes that could only be redeemed at the Banque d'Anvers. During its first decades of activity, the bank had no capital of its own, until it was reorganized and capitalized in 1870, when the Société Générale de Belgique took up half of the shareholders' equity.

In 1919, the Banque d'Anvers absorbed the Banque de l’Union Anversoise (est. 1910) and the Crédit Mobilier de Belgique (est. 1900 as the Banque de Reports, de Fonds Publics et de Dépôts, changed name in July 1914), which it fully merged into itself in 1924. In 1934-1935, the Société Générale de Belgique consolidated all its other local affiliates into the newly formed Générale de Banque, but the family shareholders of the Banque d'Anvers rejected that option and the bank thus remained as the SGB's only autonomous local affiliate bank in Belgium. The Banque d'Anvers only had to divest its relatively small portfolio of industrial participations, for which it formed a separate holding entity, the Crédit Mobilier d'Anvers, whose equity it distributed to its own shareholders.

Following World War II, the Banque d'Anvers absorbed other local banks, the Banque de Crédit Commercial in 1957, and the venerable Banque J. J. Le Grelle (est. 1792) in 1962. Even so, the Banque d'Anvers lacked critical mass in the context of 1960s Belgium. On 30 November 1965, it was merged into the Générale de Banque, simultaneously as the Société Belge de Banque. As a consequence, it returned to the status it had in its origin years as a mere local branch of the Générale. In subsequent years, its head office building on Antwerp's Meir thoroughfare featured a sign that read "Generale Bankmaatschappij v/h Bank van Antwerpen", lit. 'Générale de Banque, formerly Bank of Antwerp'.

== Leadership ==
- Joannes Josephus Osy, chairman 1827-1866?
- Charles Gréban de Saint-Germain, chairman 1870-?
- Ferdinand Baeyens, chairman ca. 1890
- Philippe Dulait, chairmen 1964?-1965

Hector Carlier, founder of Petrofina, started his career at the Banque d'Anvers, in which his father held a significant equity stake.

== See also ==
- Banque Italo-Belge
- Banque Liégeoise
- Banque de Commerce
- List of banks in Belgium
