= Société Générale de Belgique =

Former Belgian bank and holding company

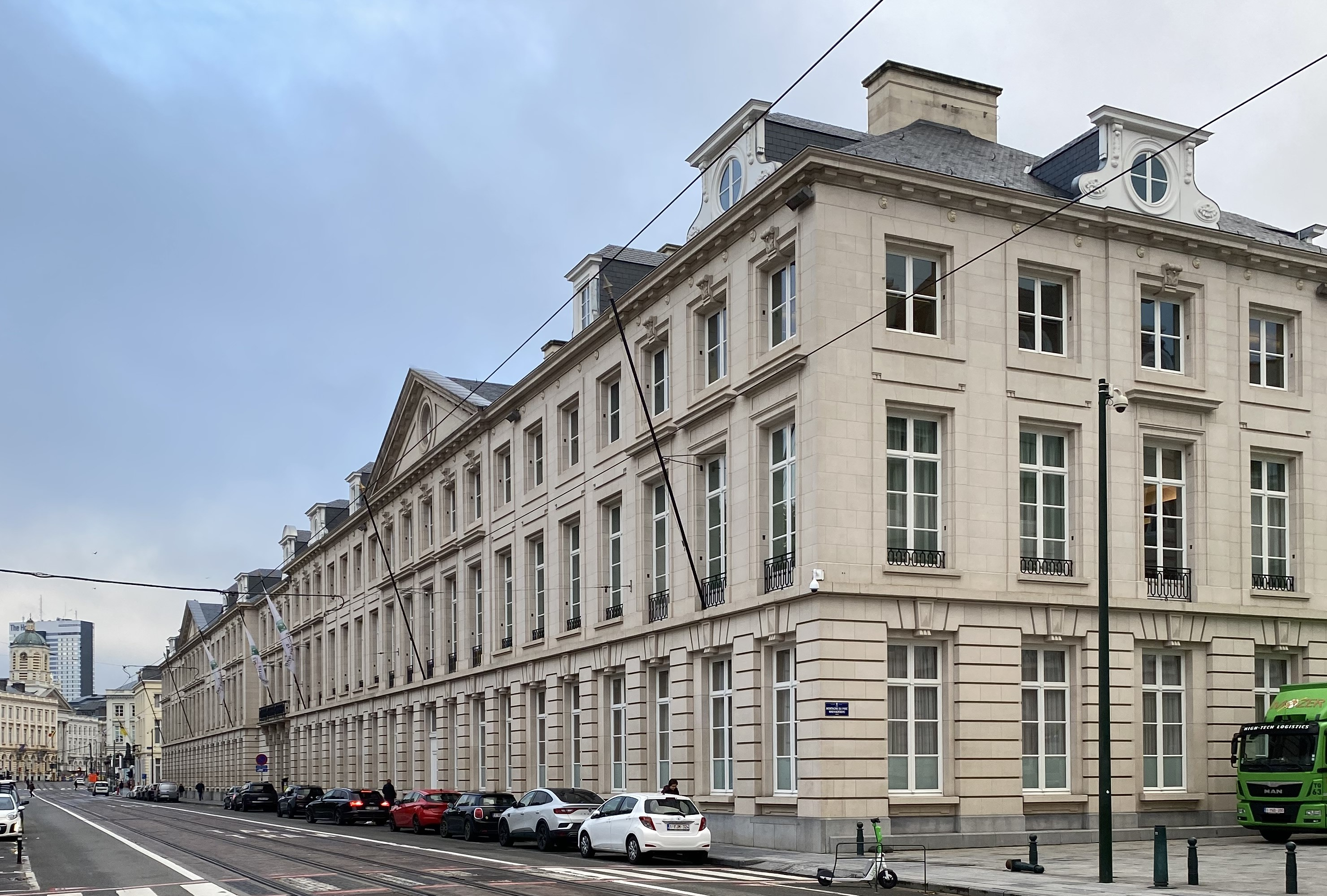
The Société Générale de Belgique's former seat, from 1934 onwards on the Rue Royale/Koningsstraat in Brussels (as rebuilt in 1968–1972)

The Société Générale de Belgique (French pronunciation: [sɔsjete ʒeneʁal də bɛlʒik]; Dutch: Generale Maatschappij van België, lit. 'General Company of Belgium'; often referred to in Belgium simply as "Société Générale" or SGB) was an investment bank and, subsequently, an industrial and financial conglomerate in Belgium between 1822 and 2003. It has been described as the world's first universal bank. The banking element was split in 1935 and became the Générale de Banque. At its height in the late 19th and early 20th centuries, the Société Générale exercised significant control over large portions of the national economy of Belgium and the Belgian colonial empire.

The Société Générale was originally founded as an investment bank called the Société Générale des Pays-Bas pour favoriser l'industrie nationale or Algemeene Nederlandsche Maatschappij ter Begunstiging van de Volksvlijt (lit. 'General Netherlands Society for Advantage to the National Industry') by William I of the Netherlands in 1822 when Belgium was under his rule within the United Kingdom of the Netherlands. After the Belgian Revolution in 1830, it was the new country's dominant financial institution and remained so even after the creation of the National Bank of Belgium in 1850. Its investments in the national economy contributed to the rapid development of the Industrial Revolution in the country and it soon emerged at the head of a major conglomerate of industrial and financial institutions active in Belgium and the Belgian Congo. The bank pioneered investments in non-listed equity.

The Société Générale went through multiple restructurings throughout the 20th century. In 1988, the Paris-based Suez Company took over the Société Générale through a competitive takeover bid. In 2003, Suez brought the Société Générale to an end by merging it with Tractebel, another of its subsidiaries.

== History ==
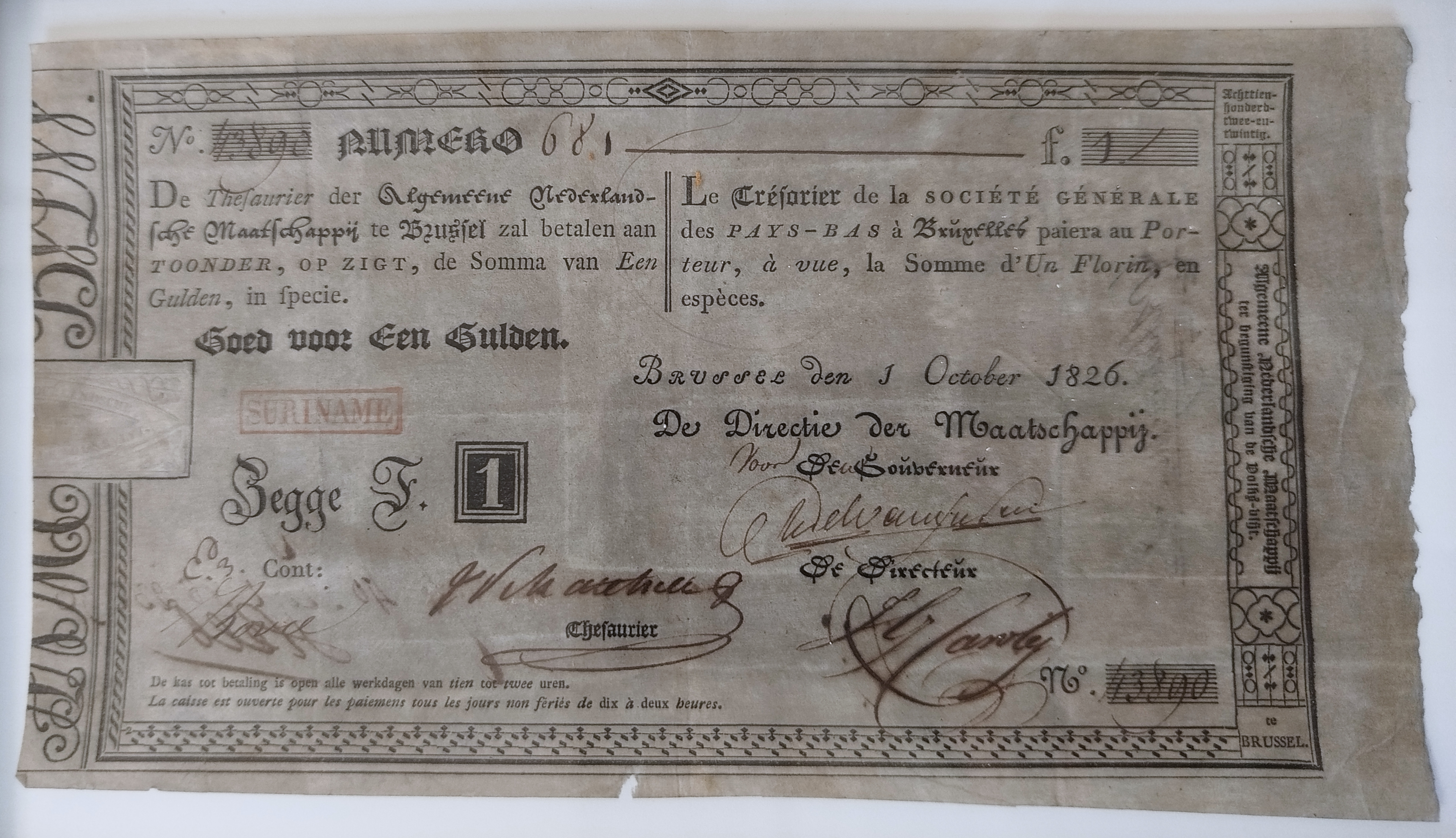
A small denomination banknote issued by the Société générale in 1826 for use in the Dutch colonial territory of Surinam

As part of the terms of the Treaty of Paris in 1814, the countries of Europe agreed to augment their armed forces from militias to standing armies. Although Belgium had been offered independence by the Prussians, Britain's Lord Castlereagh vetoed it on the grounds that the country was too small to be economically viable, and the question then arose of who should govern it, the Austrians having washed their hands of it as a historical accident of the breakup of the Habsburg Empire. Although William I of the Netherlands refused initially on the grounds of the added expense involved in maintaining his own army, Castlereagh persuaded him by asking him if he preferred to be Prince of Orange or King of the Netherlands, adding that from a practical point of view the Belgian Ducal Estates amounted to a third of the country.

William subsequently founded the Algemeene Nederlandsche Maatschappij in 1822 in part to administer these large estates, while proclaiming the goal of increasing the welfare of the country. Upon contributing 28,108 hectares of forst land, the king was the single largest shareholder of the Algemeene Nederlandsche Maatschappij at its founding, the rest being subscribed by public and charitable institutions, other companies, and individuals. During its early years it had a dual activity, as managers of its vast forest lands and as a bank, supplementing De Nederlandsche Bank (est. 1814) which was active in the northern part of the kingdom. Its first banknotes were issued on 3 March 1823. It also acted as fiscal agent of the royal government, for which it developed a network of branches throughout the Southern Netherlands (including Luxembourg and Diekirch). Its branch in Antwerp, established in 1823, was converted in 1827 into a fully-fledged subsidiary, the Banque d'Anvers. Because the bank's operations were dominated by the profit-making interests of its private shareholders, it fell short of the aims the king had set for it in terms of fostering economic development.

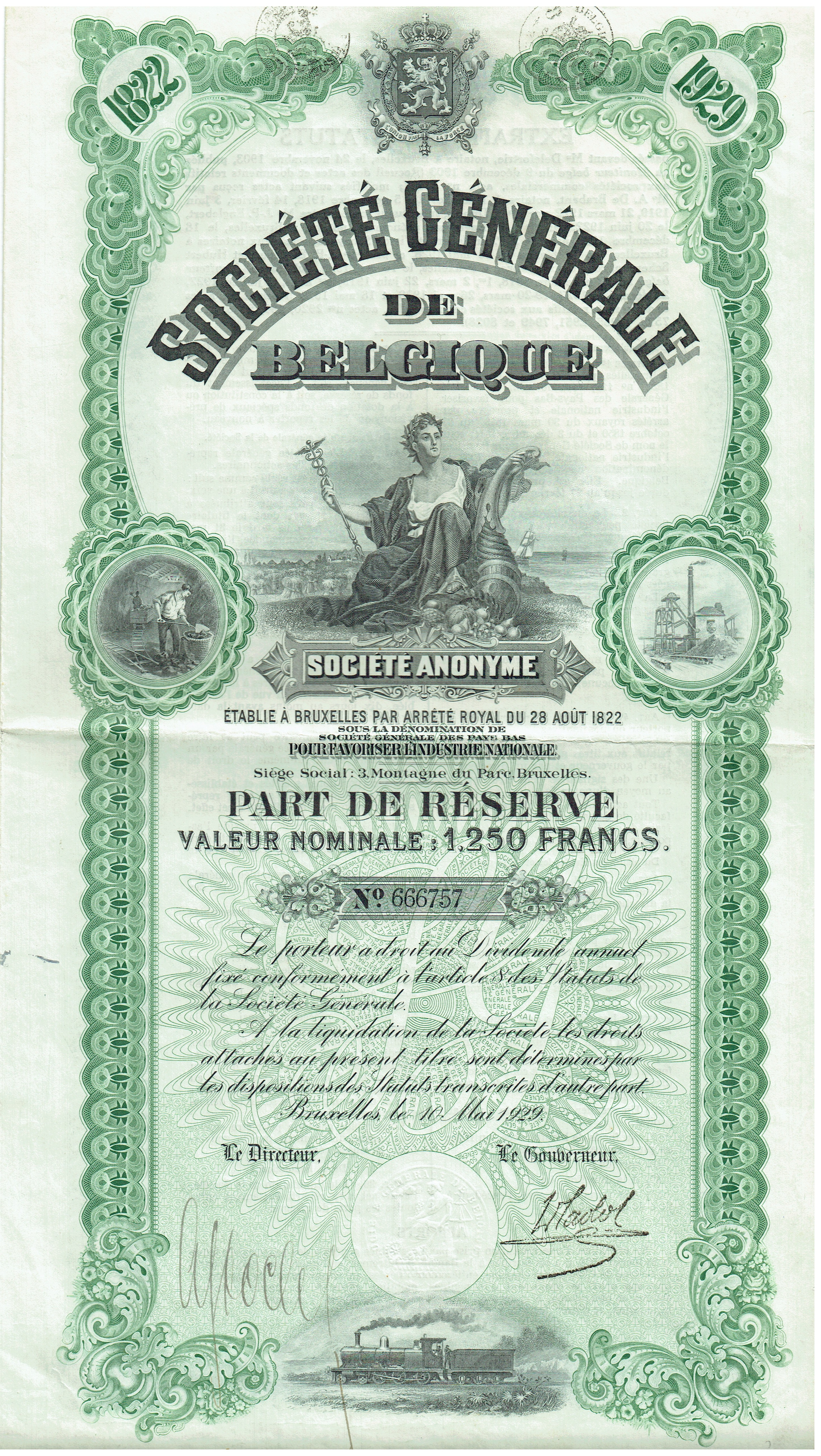
Certificate of the Société générale de Belgique, issued 10 May 1929

After the Belgian Revolution of 1830, the company took the French name Société Générale de Belgique. It sold off its land holdings at low prices to the immediate circle of the Board.

By 1914, the Société Générale was by far the largest bank in Belgium, operating in conjunction with 18 affiliated banks in the country which it practically controlled. Under the harsh German occupation of Belgium during World War I, as the National Bank of Belgium had moved its operations and reserves to London, the Société Générale became formally the central bank for the country by creating a monetary issue department within itself. It remained secretly in contact with the National Bank in exile, however, and effectively acted on behalf of the latter; so that when Belgium recovered its sovereignty, the National Bank took over all liabilities and assets of the Société Générale's issue department, which was subsequently closed.

In 1928, the Société Générale absorbed the Banque d'Outremer and thus became a major participant in the economy of the Belgian Congo. Throughout the 1920s, its affiliated banks took over many formerly independent local banks throughout Belgium. By end-1930, it represented 32.9 percent of the aggregate liabilities and 31.0 percent of the aggregate capital of the entire Belgian banking system, and was a similarly dominant investor in large mining, infrastructure, and industrial companies. In the 1930s, the Société Générale in turn absorbed all its local Belgian banking affiliates with the only exception of the Banque d'Anvers, then spun off the Générale de Banque as mandated by new Belgian legislation in 1935 while keeping controlling ownership of it. By end-1939, the Société Générale's share of the Belgian banking sector's total assets had further risen to 32.6 percent.

By the mid-1960, Time reported that the SGB still had control of "a fourth of Belgium's industry and half of the Congo's".

In 1988, Suez secured control of the SGB following a hostile takeover contest with Carlo de Benedetti. The SGB was also from the start the largest shareholder of Fortis AG, the Belgian entity of the Fortis Group, with a 20 percent stake as of end-1991. In June 1998, Suez acquired 100 percent of the SGB's equity as part of its effort to secure majority control of Tractebel, while Fortis Group acquired the Générale de Banque, thus completing the separation of the bank from its parent entity initiated in 1934. By August 1998, Tractebel and Fortis together represented over 90 percent of the value of the SGB's holdings, the rest being mainly a controlling stake in Union Minière and minority stakes in SAGEM and ARBED. The SGB itself was fully integrated into the Suez group in subsequent years and its legal existence ended in 2003, in parallel with divestment of the group's stake in Fortis.

== Head Office ==
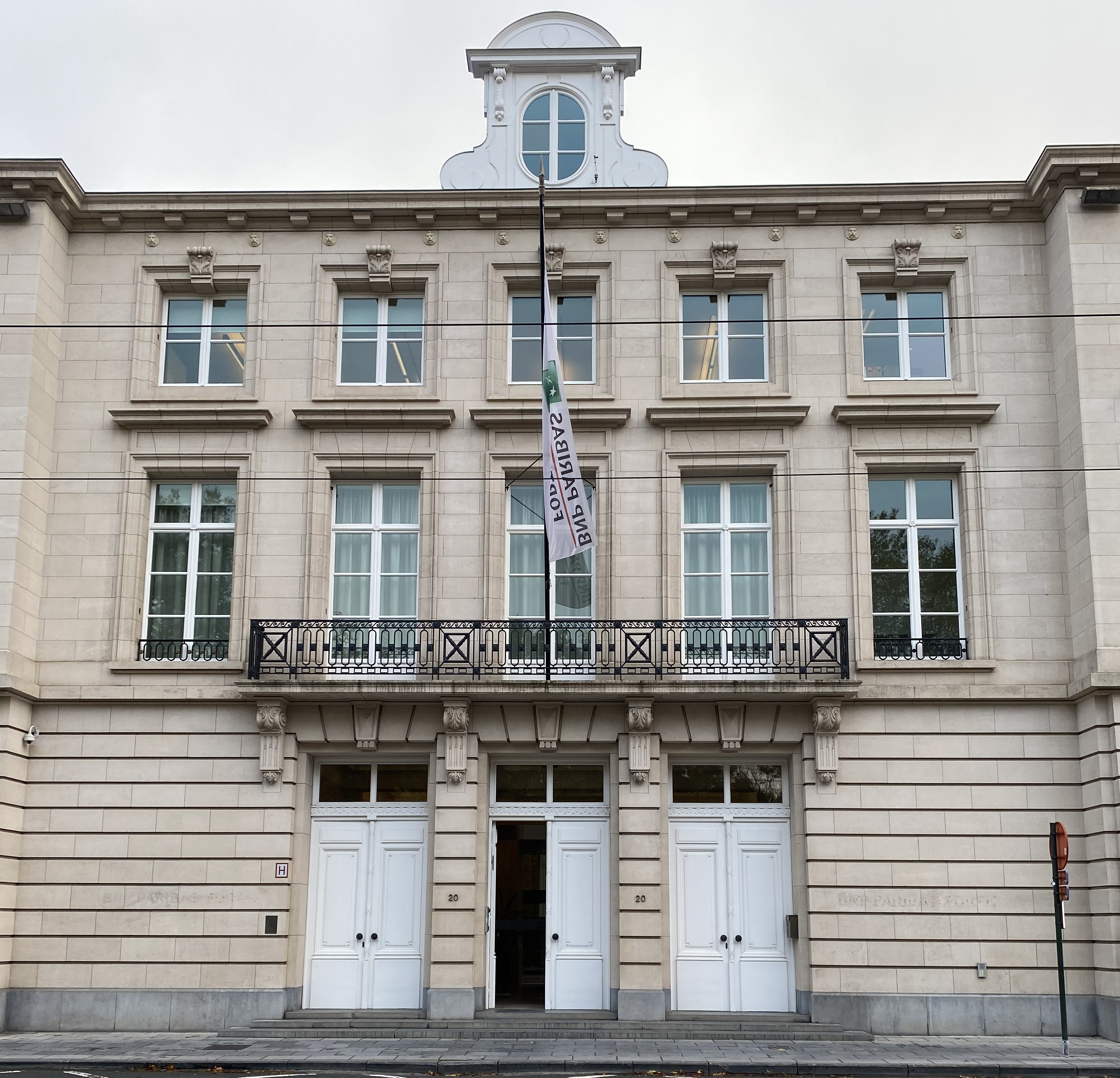
Main entrance of the former SGB head office at 20, rue Royale/Koningsstraat, Brussels

Immediately after its creation in 1822, the company acquired for its head office the former Brussels branch (French: refuge) of Averbode Abbey, at 3, rue Montagne du Parc/Warandeberg, a neoclassical structure designed by Barnabé Guimard and built in 1779–1781, which had become known as the Hôtel Wellington following a sojourn by Arthur Wellesley, 1st Duke of Wellington in June 1815, just before the Battle of Waterloo. The SGB subsequently expanded to other adjacent structures. After the Rue Ravenstein/Ravensteinstraat was created in 1911–1913 as part of the construction of Brussels' North–South connection, the SGB's premises were expanded southward with a Beaux-Arts wing bordering the new street all the way to what is now the Rue Baron Horta/Baron Hortastraat, designed by Jacques Van Mansfeld.

Meanwhile, in 1904, the SGB had acquired its first building uphill on the same block, facing the more prestigious Rue Royale/Koningsstraat, which it had rebuilt in 1908. In 1914, under the German occupation of Belgium during World War I, one of these buildings' rooms was used for the Comité National de Secours et d'Alimentation ("National Relief and Food Committee"). Further properties on the Rue Royale were bought in 1922 and rebuilt in 1928. When the SGB spun off its Belgian bank in 1934, the Banque de la Société Générale de Belgique kept the storied address as 3, rue Montagne du Parc, while the SGB itself relocated to the Rue Royale.

In 1966, the SGB and Société Générale de Banque decided to demolish and rebuild the entire block, including the Petit Béguinage on the corner of the Rue Royale and the Rue Montagne du Parc, also designed by Barnabé Guimard in the late 18th century, which was razed in 1968. The new structures fronting the Rue Royale, designed by Pierre Guillissen and Hugo Van Kuyck in neoclassical style reminiscent of Guimard, were completed in 1972, while the Générale de Banque's new head office downhill was reconstructed in several phases in brutalist style. The new SGB building displayed a long, symmetrical façade with a main entrance at 20, rue Royale. Following the respective mergers of the SGB into Suez-Lyonnaise and of the Générale de Banque into Fortis Group in 1999, the building was taken over by Fortis and used as its Belgian headquarters, then after 2008 by BNP Paribas Fortis.

== Notable subsidiaries ==
The following companies were once majority owned by the Société Générale:

- Ateliers de Constructions Electriques de Charleroi - electric construction — electronics
- Coditel — public utility
- Compagnie Maritime Belge — cargo and shipping company
- Distrigas — public utility
- Electrabel — public utility
- FN Herstal — arms manufacturer
- Générale de Banque — bank
- La Brugeoise et Nivelles - Belgian rolling stock manufacturing company
- Tractebel — public utility
- Union Minière du Haut Katanga — mining company
- Forminière - lumber and mining

== Governors ==
The following individuals were governors of the Société Générale:

- Ocker Repelaer van Driel (1823–1830)
- Ferdinand de Meeûs (1830–1861)
- Charles Liedts (1861–1877)
- Victor Tesch (1877–1892)
- Ferdinand Baeyens (1892–1913)
- Jean Jadot (1913–1932)
- Emile Francqui (1932–1935)
- Alexandre Galopin (1935–1944)
- Gaston Blaise (1944–1950)
- Paul Gillet (1950–1961)
- Max Nokin (1961–1974)
- Paul-Emile Corbiau (1975–1980)
- René Lamy (1981–1988)

After the takeover by Suez in 1988, the position of Governor was terminated. The following individuals held the chief executive position (French: présidence du comité de direction):

- Hervé de Carmoy (1988–1991)
- Gérard Mestrallet (1991–1995)
- Philippe Liotier (1995–1998)
- Christine Morin-Postel (1998–2001)

== See also ==
- List of banks in Belgium
