= Angelo Caloia =

- Born: May 2, 1939 (age 86)
- Occupations: Economist, banker
- Years active: 1989–2009 (as President of the Vatican Bank)
- Known for: President of the Vatican Bank (1989–2009)

Angelo Caloia (born 2 May 1939) is an Italian economist and banker, who was the President of the Vatican Bank for 20 years until September 2009.

== Career ==
In 1989, he was called by Pope John Paul II to lead the Institute for the Works of Religion, which made him president of the Vatican Bank. He took office after Paul Marcinkus was forced out due to multiple scandals. He was chosen in order to restore the reputation of the bank and gets its financial affairs in order, but soon afterwards clashed with Donato De Bonis. He stated that during his time at IOR, he tried to be more transparent, but said overall that he "healed" the IOR and stated that the accounts were positive upon his leaving and that there was a clean house.

He left the office on 23 September 2009 and was replaced by Ettore Gotti Tedeschi. He left a year before the end of his mandate by direct choice of the Cardinal Secretary of State. After leaving office he became professor of political economy at the Catholic University and president of the Mediocredito Lombardo bank.

== Legal issues ==
The investigation started after Ernst von Freyberg in 2013 commissioned an independent audit of sale properties that had been owned by the bank after "suspicious accounting procedures". In December 2014, the Vatican's prosecutor, Gian Piero Milano, froze accounts with millions of euros held by Caloia as he suspected the men of misrepresenting the sale price. Upon the prosecutor's start of investigation, Caloia denied any wrongdoing. The alleged laundering occurred between 2001 and 2008. He was sentenced on Thursday, January 21, 2021, to eight years in prison for embezzling money following a real estate transaction.
