= François Pauly =

Luxembourg banker (born 1964)

- Born: June 30, 1964 (age 62); Luxembourg
- Education: ESCP Business School
- Occupation: Banker
- Known for: Senior executive at a number of banks including the Vatican Bank

François Pauly (born 30 June 1964 in Luxembourg) is a Luxembourgish banker and banking executive. He has held senior executive and supervisory positions at Dexia, Sal. Oppenheim, Banque Internationale à Luxembourg, Edmond de Rothschild and Compagnie Financière La Luxembourgeoise. Since 2026, he has served as president of the Board of Superintendence of the Institute for the Works of Religion (IOR), commonly known as the Vatican Bank.

== Early life and education ==
Pauly was born on 30 June 1964 in Luxembourg. He is a Luxembourgish national. In 1987, he graduated from the EAP European School of Management, which later became part of ESCP Business School.

== Career ==
After completing his studies, Pauly began his career in banking. From 1987 to 2004, he held several senior positions within the Dexia group in Luxembourg, Italy and Monaco. In Italy, he served from 2002 to 2003 as deputy chief executive officer of Dexia Crediop.

In 2004, Pauly joined the private bank Sal. Oppenheim in Luxembourg. He became general manager of Sal. Oppenheim jr. & Cie. S.C.A. and served on the boards of directors of the group's Swiss, Austrian and German subsidiaries. He subsequently worked for BIP Investment Partners.

In 2011, Pauly became chief executive officer of Banque Internationale à Luxembourg (BIL). From 2014 to 2016, he served as chairman of the bank's board of directors. Between 2011 and 2016, he also sat on the boards of directors of Luxair and the Luxembourg Stock Exchange.

Since 1995, Pauly has been involved with Compagnie Financière La Luxembourgeoise, where he has been listed as a board member and chairman. He also assumed mandates at other Luxembourgish and international companies, including Cobepa, Tikehau Capital and LALUX Assurances.

In 2016, Pauly became vice-chairman of the board of directors of Edmond de Rothschild (Europe) in Luxembourg and chairman of the audit and risk committee of Edmond de Rothschild (Suisse). In June 2021, he was appointed chief executive officer of the Edmond de Rothschild Group, succeeding Vincent Taupin. In March 2023, Edmond de Rothschild announced that Ariane de Rothschild would take over the leadership of the group and that Pauly would step down from his executive role after seven years with the company. He initially remained associated with the group as an independent board member of its real estate investment management subsidiary, Edmond de Rothschild REIM.

Pauly was a member of the board of directors of the Vatican Pension Fund from 2017 to 2021. In October 2024, he was appointed a member of the Board of Superintendence of the Institute for the Works of Religion. On 25 March 2026, the IOR announced that Pauly had been elected the next president of the Board of Superintendence; his appointment had been confirmed by the Commission of Cardinals on 28 January 2026. He succeeded Jean-Baptiste Douville de Franssu, who had chaired the body since 2014.

== Other activities ==
Pauly served on several foundation and nonprofit boards. In 2021, the Fondation de Luxembourg announced that Pauly, who had served on the foundation’s board of directors since 2018, had stepped down from the board. He also serves on the boards of the Félix Chomé Foundation and the Félix Chomé Brazil Foundation.

Pauly was named as an appointed member of the board of the Luxembourg Red Cross in 2026.
