= Arco =

Arco may refer to:

== Places ==
- Arco, Trentino, a town in Trentino, Italy
- Arco, Idaho, in the United States
- Arco, Minnesota, a city in the United States
- ARCO Arena in Sacramento, California, home of the Sacramento Kings

== Companies ==
- ARCO (brand), a brand of gasoline service stations that is currently owned by Marathon Petroleum in Mexico and parts of the United States
- ARCO Chemical, a chemical company formed in 1986 by spinning off a subsidiary from the Atlantic Richfield Company
- ARCO Group, a Belgian cooperative holding company
- Atlantic Richfield Company, the Atlantic Richfield Company, formerly an independent American petroleum company (1966-2000), currently a subsidiary of BP
- ARCO Solar, a former subsidiary of the Atlantic Richfield Company that manufactured solar panels.

== Arts and entertainment ==
=== Music ===
- Arco, a directive in music for string instruments to return to bowing after playing pizzicato; see bowing
- Associate of the Royal College of Organists, a professional diploma for church organists awarded by the Royal College of Organists
- Arco (band), a British slowcore band

=== Other media ===
- Arco (film), a 2025 French animated film by Ugo Bienvenu
- Arco (video game), a 2024 indie tactical role-playing game.

== People ==
- Anton Graf von Arco auf Valley (1897–1945), commonly known as Anton Arco-Valley, murdered Kurt Eisner
- Georg von Arco (1869–1940), early wireless pioneer
- Jean Baptist, Comte d'Arco (c. 1650–1715), a diplomat and Generalfeldmarschall
- Johann Philipp d'Arco (1652–1704), a soldier who served Habsburg Austria

== Other uses ==
- Arco (ARDM-5), a type of U.S. Navy floating drydock
- Arco (lamp), a 1962 design, subject of 2006 intellectual property dispute
- A shortened form of arcology
- A male given name in the Netherlands, for example: Arco Jochemsen, a Dutch footballer

== See also ==
- El Arco (disambiguation)
- Arko (disambiguation)
