= Arko =

Arko may refer to:

== People ==
- Arkady Baghdasaryan (Arko) (1945–2022), Armenian painter
- Arko Datta (born 1969), Indian photojournalist
- Arko Pravo Mukherjee, Indian composer, singer and songwriter
- Arko (surname)
  - Ernest Papa Arko (born 1984), Ghanaian footballer
  - Swinthin Maxwell Arko (1920-2006), Ghanaian politician

== Other uses ==
- Arko, an Olympic-level show jumping horse ridden by Nick Skelton
- Arko, My Game, a book written by Ken Arthurson
- Arko (tr:Arko), a brand of shaving and personal care products by the Turkish company Evyap

== See also ==
- Arco (disambiguation)
