= Battista Mario Salvatore Ricca =

Italian priest

Battista Mario Salvatore Ricca (born 22 January 1956) is an Italian priest serving as interim prelate of the Vatican Bank.

== Early life ==
Ricca was born on 22 January 1956 in the city of Brescia in Lombardy, Italy. Pontifical Ecclesiastical Academy from 1985 to 1989. After becoming a priest in 1980, he served as a parochial vicar in Brescia until 1985. From 1985 to 1989, he studied at the Pontifical Ecclesiastical Academy in Rome.

== Career ==
Ricca served at the Holy See's nunciatures in Congo, Algeria, Colombia, Switzerland, Uruguay, and Trinidad & Tobago between 1989 and 2005. In 2005, he joined the Section for General Affairs of the Secretariat of State of the Holy See. In 2009, he joined the Section for Relations with States of the Secretariat of State.

After 2006, Ricca ran several Vatican-owned properties, including Saint Martha House, the hotel in which Pope Francis resided while his official residence was being renovated.

In June 2013, Ricca was appointed interim prelate of the Vatican Bank, also known as the Institute for the Works of Religion (IOR). The position of prelate had been vacant since 2011, when Ettore Gotti Tedeschi was removed as prelate over alleged incompetence. Ricca replaced the previous interim prelate, the German financier Ernst von Freyberg, who was appointed by Benedict XVI shortly before his resignation as Pope. Ricca was nominated by Secretary of State Tarcisio Bertone, and his nomination was personally supported by Pope Francis.

Shortly after he was appointed interim prelate, Ricca was accused of being part of the "gay lobby" at the Vatican and of having engaged in homosexual relationships while working at the nunciature of Uruguay between 1999 and 2004. In a 2013 interview, Pope Francis said a preliminary investigation into Ricca had found no evidence for the accusations against him.
