= Axel Miller =

Belgian businessman (born 1965)

- Born: 20 February 1965 (age 61); Uccle
- Education: Master's degree in Law from the Université libre de Bruxelles
- Occupation: Businessman

Axel Miller (born 20 February 1965, Uccle) is a Belgian businessman. From January 2006 to September 2008, he was chief executive officer and chairman of the management board of Dexia S.A. Since 2009, he is partner of Petercam, a Belgian financial group, active in private banking, institutional asset management and corporate finance.

== Early life ==
Miller's mother was a chemist and his father a biochemist. He spent his childhood between France, England, and Belgium.

In 1987, Miller obtained a master's degree in Law from the Université libre de Bruxelles (ULB), Brussels.

== Career ==
Miller started his career in 1987 as a lawyer working for the legal firm Simont & Simont. In 1988, he worked in Alain Minc's team in the failed hostile IPO launched on the Générale de Belgique. In September 1990, he joined Davis Polk & Wardwell, first in New York (United States) then in Paris (France). He went to work as a lawyer at the bar in Brussels in January 1991. In December 1991, he started working for Stibbe Simont Monahan Duhot in Brussels, where he became a partner in 1996, a member of the recruitment committee and then member of the management board. In 1995, he was among the lawyers that worked on the merger of Crédit Communal de Belgique and Crédit Local de France to create Dexia. As soon as 1997, he became an adviser to Dexia and to its CEO, Pierre Richard, and played an active role in the acquisition of the Banque Internationale à Luxembourg in 1999, Financial Security Assurance in 2000 and Artesia in 2001. In May 1999, he joined Clifford Chance in Brussels as a partner.

He joined the Dexia Group in 2001 as general counsel. Upon his arrival, he was in charge of merging the activities of three banks: Dexia Bank, Bacob Bank and Paribas Bank Belgium. In January 2002, he became a member of the management board of Dexia Bank, and in January 2003 he became chairman of the management board of Dexia Bank and head of personal financial services at group level. Miller is vice-president of the Belgian Banking Association and a member of the board of directors of Febelfin. He is also a director of several Dexia Group companies, of Ethias, of Crédit du Nord and of Carmeuse Holding.

In 2006, Miller became the CEO of Dexia. In June 2006, he led the acquisition of Turkish DenizBank. As head of Dexia, he also had to deal with the Lernout & Hauspie affair. Following the subprime mortgage crisis, Miller resigned on 30 September 2008. In 2009, he became a partner of Petercam, a Belgian financial group, active in private banking, institutional asset management and corporate finance. In August 2013, he was appointed CEO of D'Ieteren, a major car distributor in Western Europe.

== Bailout ==
On 30 September 2008 the Belgian, French and Luxembourg governments said they would put in 6.4bn euros ($9bn; £5bn) into keep Dexia afloat. On the same day at 10:02 am the BBC News Channel broke news which had come from the news provider AFP "Dexia Chairman and the Chief Executive resign after bailout". This was later confirmed live on the BBC News Channel from Brussels at 10:24 am. Miller and Pierre Richard were chairman and chief executive respectively.

A Belgian parlemential commission concluded after a deep investigation that the former CEO of Dexia failed to do his job and was responsible for the bailout of Dexia.

== Personal life ==
Miller is divorced from Catherine Duhen. They have four children together. He’s now married with Julie Dupont.
