= Diocese of Horta =

Africa Proconsularis.

Horta was a city and bishopric in Roman Africa, which only remains as Latin Catholic titular see.

== History ==
Horta, identified with Srâ-Orta in modern Tunisia, was among the many cities of sufficient importance in the Roman province of Africa Proconsularis, in the papal sway, to become a suffragan diocese of the Archbishopric of capital Carthage. Like many, it faded completely, plausibly at the 7th century advent of Islam.

Its only historically documented bishop, Donatus, partook in the Council of Carthage (646) against the heresy of monotheletism.

== Titular see ==
The diocese was nominally restored in 1933 as Latin titular bishopric of Horta (Latin) / Orta (Curiate Italian) / Horten(sis) (Latin adjective)

It has had the following incumbents of the fitting Episcopal (lowest) rank with an archiepiscopal exception:

- Cardinal Rodolfo degli Armanni della Staffa (Italian) (1126? – death 1140) while Cardinal-Deacon of Santa Maria in Aquiro (1125–1140)
- Maximino Romero de Lema (1964.06.15 – death 1968.10.19) as Auxiliary Bishop of Archdiocese of Madrid (Spain) (1964.06.15 – 1968.10.19); later Bishop of Ávila (Spain) (1968.10.19 – 1973.03.21), Secretary of Commission of Cardinals for the Pontifical Shrines of Pompeii, Loreto and Bari (1973 – 1986), Secretary of Congregation for Clergy (1973.03.21 – 1986), emeritate as Titular Archbishop of Aemona (1973.03.21 – 1996.10.29)
- Titular Archbishop: Paul Casimir Marcinkus (USA) (1968.12.24 – death 2006.02.21) as Roman Curia official : Secretary of Administrative Office of Institute for Works of Religion (1969–1970), President of Institute for the Works of Religion (1971–1989), Pro-President of Pontifical Commission for Vatican City State (1981.09.26 – 1990.10.30) and finally emeritate
- Darwin Rudy Andino Ramírez, Somascans (C.R.S.) (2006.04.01 – 2011.11.07) as Auxiliary Bishop of Archdiocese of Tegucigalpa (Honduras) (2006.04.01 – 2011.11.07); next Bishop of Santa Rosa de Copán (Honduras) (2011.11.07 – ...)
- Fidelis Lionel Emmanuel Fernando (2011.11.28 – ...), Auxiliary Bishop of Archdiocese of Colombo (Sri Lanka) (2011.11.28 – ...).

== See also ==
- List of Catholic dioceses in Tunisia
