= Francine Swiggers =

Belgian businesswoman

Francine Swiggers is a Belgian businesswoman, the chairman of the management board of the ARCO Group since November 2007.

== Biography ==
Francine Swiggers obtained a licence in Applied Economic Sciences and Master in Business Administration at the Katholieke Universiteit Leuven (Leuven, Belgium).

Francine Swiggers started her career at the BACOB Bank of the Catholic workers organisation beweging.net (formerly known as ACW). Since 1995, she was in charge of the strategic planning.

She is a member of the management board of ARCO Group since 1997. In 2010–11, the group was hit hard by the Dexia crisis. In 2013, as ARCO was heading towards bankruptcy (96% of ARCO's assets had been invested in Dexia prior to its debacle), it appeared that Francine Swigglers still had sixteen remunerated mandates within the company.

She is also Director of Dexia Crédit Local, VDK Spaarbank and the Belgian water treatment company Aquafin.

In 2019 she filed a lawsuit against Arco investors that started a lawsuit against her in light of the Arco legal issues.

== Sources ==
- Francine Swiggers (press release)
- Francine Swiggers is machtigste zakenvrouw van België
