= Ernst von Freyberg =

German banker

Ernst Freiherr von Freyberg
- Born: 26 October 1958 (age 67); Geneva

Ernst Conrad Rudolf Freiherr von Freyberg-Eisenberg (born 26 October 1958 in Geneva) is a German manager and was President of the Istituto per le Opere di Religione between February 2013 and July 2014

== Family ==
Freyberg is the eldest of three sons of Ulrich von Freyberg-Eisenberg and Brita Gertrud Blohm. He is married and a member of the Sovereign Military Order of Malta.

== Early life ==
He studied law at LMU Munich and the University of Bonn from 1978 to 1985 and at the German University of Administrative Sciences Speyer from 1986 to 1987. He was admitted to the bar in Ulm in 1988.

== Career ==
=== Founding of Finance House von Freyberg ===
From 1988 to 1991, Freyberg worked as an analyst for TCR Europe Limited and Three Cities Research, Inc. In 1991, he co-founded finance house von Freyberg. In 1998, Close Brothers Corporate Finance Ltd, the corporate finance arm of Close Brothers, replaced finance house von Mellenthin with finance house von Freyberg as its German associate, purchasing 51%. In 2005, Close Brothers Corporate Finance began consolidating its European network and finance house Freyberg was renamed Freyberg Close Brothers. In 2010, Close Brothers Corporate Finance became loss-making and Close Brothers Group put it up for sale. It was purchased by the Japanese investment bank Daiwa Securities SMBC and is now called Daiwa Corporate Advisory GmbH. In 2012, Ernst von Freyberg was replaced as CEO by Stefan Jaecker.

=== Chairmanship and supervisory board activities ===
Since 2012, he has been chairman of the supervisory board of Blohm + Voss, and was/is member of other supervisory and advisory boards, e.g. of Malteser Deutschland GmbH, the Flossbach von Storch AG trust administration and the IT service provider Magirus AG.

=== Istituto per le Opere di Religione (IOR) ===
Ernst von Freyberg was appointed President of the Board of Superintendence of the Istituto per le Opere di Religione (IOR) by the Commission of Cardinals of the IOR on 15 February 2013 replacing Ettore Gotti Tedeschi. Freyberg was named ad interim Director of the IOR on 1 July 2013, following the resignations of Director Paolo Cipriani and Deputy Director Massimo Tulli On 30 November 2013, Rolando Marranci was appointed new General Director.

During his tenure at the IOR, von Freyberg has identified two particular tasks as critically important. Firstly, he wants to open up the Institute and make it more transparent. Secondly, he will investigate and, where necessary, eliminate any cases of money laundering and tax evasion. Von Freyberg has also espoused a “zero tolerance” approach when it comes to suspicious transactions.

In July 2014, it was announced that Freyberg had been replaced by Jean-Baptiste de Franssu.

== Non-occupational activities ==
Ernst von Freyberg is Knight of the Sovereign Military Order of Malta. His voluntary work at the Order of Malta particularly focuses on accompanying pilgrimages to Lourdes and acting as honorary treasurer for the order's German association. In 2009, he also founded the Freyberg Stiftung. The foundation’s main goals lie in supporting teenagers through education.
