= Marcinkus =

Marcinkus is a surname. Notable people with the surname:

- Paul Marcinkus (1922–2006), American Roman Catholic Archbishop
- Romualdas Marcinkus (1907–1944), Lithuanian pilot
