= Marcinkus (play) =

Play written by Tom Flannery

- Original language: English
- Written by: Tom Flannery
- Genre: Drama

Premiere
- Date: 2006

Marcinkus is a 2006 one-man play by American author Tom Flannery, based on the life of Roman Catholic Archbishop Paul Marcinkus.

== Background ==
Marcinkus is a one-man dramatization of events in the life of Catholic Archbishop Paul Marcinkus, whose tenure as head of the Vatican Bank was "surrounded by scandals from missing funds to murder implications," and included suspicions of money laundering, Ponzi schemes, and even assassination.

== Plot ==
The stageplay takes place in a small office in what may be purgatory, but looks very much like the archbishop's office in Sun City, Arizona, his last residence as a retired man of the cloth. Marcinkus relates directly to the audience stories from his youth, growing up in Al Capone's Chicago and how he eventually became a priest. As the piece unfolds he tell his version of the Vatican Bank Scandal, his appointment as head of the bank, the death of Pope John Paul I, and his job as "bulldog" to Pope John Paul II. Although dramatic, the piece is lightened by the humor that Flannery has instilled in his version of Marcinkus, who was popularly quoted as saying"You can't run the church on Hail Marys".

== Production history ==
The play had its debut in Wilkes-Barre, Pennsylvania in the summer of 2006, at the Arts YOUniverse center for the applied and living arts. The production was under the direction of Paul Winarski and starred Greg Korin as the Archbishop.

After several revisions by the director and author to streamline the piece, the play was remounted in Scranton in 2007, in February at the Old Brick Theatre, where it was covered by The Chicago Tribune as a "local boy made good (or bad)" piece. The new production ran 15 minutes shorter, and is considered the final version of the play.

As of this date, a Las Vegas production of the play was in planning, which was expected to feature original star, Greg Korin.

== Critical response ==
The original production in Wilkes-Barre in the summer of 2006 "opened to rave reviews".

A niece of Archbishop Marcinkus, afraid that the play would be a "hatchet job", contacted playwright Flannery, who sent her a copy of the text. She expressed agreement that the play was a balanced look at her uncle's life, and offered suggestions that the Flannery included in a rewrite.
