= Alberto Beneduce =

Italian politician (1877–1944)

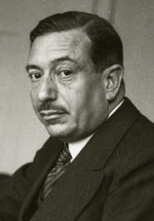
- Born: 29 March 1877; Caserta, Kingdom of Italy
- Died: 26 April 1944 (aged 67); Rome, Kingdom of Italy
- Education: University of Naples
- Years active: 1900s – 1940
- Political party: Italian Socialist Party (until 1912); Italian Reformist Socialist Party (1912–1926)
- Children: Anna; Idea Nuova Socialista; Italia Libera; Vittoria Proletaria; Ernesto

Minister of Labor and Social Security
- In office 4 July 1921 – 26 February 1922
- Prime Minister: Ivanoe Bonomi
- Preceded by: Arturo Labriola
- Succeeded by: Arnaldo Dello Sbarba

Alberto Beneduce (29 May 1877 – 26 April 1944) was an Italian politician, scholar and financier, who was among the founders of many significant state-run finance institutions in Italy.

== Early life and education ==
Beneduce was born in Caserta on 29 March 1877. He earned a mathematics degree from the University of Naples.

== Career and views ==
Beneduce was a socialist and was a leading member of the Italian Reformist Socialist Party. He was elected to the Chamber of Deputies in 1919 and 1921 representing the party from his hometown Caserta. Beneduce managed to connect with high finance figures and to collaborate with the Italy's fascist regime. He worked in different capacities, including statistician, teacher, demographer, agricultural and insurance specialist.

He was a university professor of statistics and demography until 1919. He contributed to the establishment of the national institution of insurance (INA), which was founded in 1912. He also headed the INA from 1912 to 1919. During World War I, he was asked to established an institution that would help the veterans in finding jobs. As a result, he involved in founding the related body, Opera Nazionale Combattenti (ONC). In the period between 4 July 1921 and 26 February 1922 Beneduce served as the minister of labor and social security in the cabinet led by Ivanoe Bonomi.

Beneduce was appointed head of two state-run credit bodies: Consorzio di Credito per le Opere Pubbliche (Crediop) in 1919 and Istituto di Credito per le Imprese di Pubblica Utilità (ICIPU) in 1924. Until 1939 he headed both institutions. These institutions were later merged under the name of Istituto per il Credito Navale.

In 1931, he was named as a board member of the Istituto Mobiliare Italiano. He also served as an economic advisor to Benito Mussolini. In 1933, he was appointed by Mussolini as the head of the institute for industrial reconstruction (IRI), being the first president of the body.

In 1936 Beneduce was simultaneously president of IRI, of the public credit institutions Crediop and ICIPU, of the Institute for Naval Credit, and a member of the Board of Directors of IMI and of the National Foreign Exchange Institute while in the private sector he was president of the Italian Society for Southern Railways. He served in the post until 1939 when he became a senator in 1939, but he retired from politics and other public offices due to his health problems in 1940.

However, Beneduce retained his membership on the boards of various companies until his death. He was an advocate of a company management approach based on the private-sector criteria and free from political influences. Beneduce was also a director of the leading companies, including Fiat, Pirelli, Montecatini, Edison and Generali.

=== Activities ===
Beneduce and Luigi Rossi recorded detailed statistics about Italian citizens, who had migrated to the US, but returned to Italy between 1905 and 1906. Beneduce was instrumental in the nationalization of life insurance in Italy. His activities in the finance sector of Italy shaped the industrial development of the country between the 1920s and the 1990s. One of his significant activities in this regard was the reorganization of the bankrupted Italian banking system. In addition, he was the mentor of many eminent financiers and technocrats, who reconstructed Italy after World War II. He also developed Mussolini's deflation policy.

== Personal life and death ==
Beneduce had five children, three of whom were given names that reflected his socialist orientation: Idea Nuova Socialista, Italia Libera and Vittoria Proletaria. His two other children were Ernesto and Anna. One of his daughters, Idea, married Enrico Cuccia, a significant financier.

Beneduce died in Rome on 26 April 1944.

=== Awards ===
Beneduce was awarded the Grand Officer of the Order of the Crown of Italy on 16 November 1918 and the Grand Cordon of the Order of the Crown of Italy on 5 January 1922.

== Works ==
- Capitali sottratti all'Italia dall'emigrazione per l'estero. Caserta: Tipografia della Libreria Moderna, 1904.
- Di alcuni metodi d'interpolazione. Rome: Giornale degli economisti, 1908.
- Sur calcolo della ricchezza privata di uno Stato. Rome: Giornale degli economisti, 1908.
- Della natalità: Studio di demografia comparata. Rome: Tipografia Nazionale di G. Bertero e C., 1908.
- Criteri estimativi seguiti dai periti e dalle giunte d'arbitri nei giudizi di affrancazione dagli usi civili. Rome: G. Bertero, 1910.
- Sul movimento dei rimpatriati dalle Americhe. Rome: Giornale degli economisti, 1910.
- La dodicesima sessione dell'Istituto internazionale di statistica. Rome: Giornale degli economisti, 1910.
- Saggio di statistica dei rimpatriati dalle Americhe. Rome: Cooperativa tipografia Manuzio, 1911.
- Il principio mutualistico nelle assicurazioni. Rome: Athenaeum, 1913.
- A proposito della riforma delle pensioni civili e militari. Rome: Athenaeum, 1913.
- I problemi del rischio nella vita economica. Rome: Giornale degli economisti e Rivista di statistica, 1915.
