= Facing Sudan =

- Theatrical poster
- Directed by: Bruce David Janu
- Produced by: Bruce David Janu
- Edited by: Bruce David Janu
- Music by: Tom Flannery; Lorne Clarke
- Distributed by: Bell, Book & Camera Productions
- Release date: 2007
- Running time: 90 minutes
- Country: United States
- Language: English

Facing Sudan is a documentary film released in 2007. It chronicles the situation in Sudan from independence in 1956 through civil war and the current crisis in Darfur. The narrative of Sudan is told through the eyes of activists from various segments of American society. Brian Burns—a young custodian who traveled to South Sudan to effect change there—supplies the arc in the film and links the various stories together.

The film's tagline is "Ordinary people can do extraordinary things, even in Sudan."

The film premiered in March 2007 at the Longbaugh Film Festival in Portland, Oregon. It subsequently screened at fourteen film festivals and won "Best Documentary" awards at the Landlocked Film Festival and the Illinois International Film Festival.

The film was produced, directed, and edited by Bruce David Janu. The soundtrack was composed by Tom Flannery and Lorne Clarke.

The film was released on DVD on January 8, 2008.

A follow-up to Facing Sudan was completed in July, 2008. This short documentary, Crayons, and Paper, tells the story of Dr. Jerry Ehrlich, a pediatrician who has administered to children in conflict zones worldwideCrayons and Paper, tells the story of Dr. Jerry Ehrlich, a pediatrician who has administered to children in conflict zones across the world. The film exhibits drawings from children in Sri Lanka and Darfur. Like Facing Sudan, the documentary features an original soundtrack by Flannery and Clarke.
