= Arko (surname) =

Arko is a surname. Notable people with the surname include:

- Ernest Papa Arko (born 1984), Ghanaian footballer
- Swinthin Maxwell Arko (1920–2006), Ghanaian politician
- Vladimir Arko (1888–1945), Croatian entrepreneur of Slovene origin
