= Crayons and Paper =

- Directed by: Bruce David Janu
- Produced by: Bruce David Janu
- Edited by: Bruce David Janu
- Music by: Tom Flannery, Lorne Clarke
- Distributed by: Bell, Book & Camera Productions
- Release date: February 11, 2009 (Dam Short)
- Running time: 30 minutes
- Country: United States
- Language: English

Crayons and Paper is a documentary short, featuring Dr. Jerry Ehrlich, a pediatrician who has worked with Doctors Without Borders. To document the effect of war on children, Dr. Ehrlich has the children draw pictures of their lives. The film features drawings made by children in Sri Lanka and Darfur.

The film is a follow-up to the documentary Facing Sudan. It premiered at The Dam Short Film Festival in February 2009 and was broadcast on DOC: The Documentary Channel until it changed formats.

The film was produced, directed and edited by Bruce David Janu. The soundtrack was composed by Tom Flannery and Lorne Clarke (singer).
