= Giorgio Mortara =

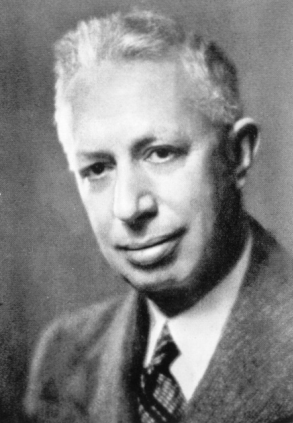
- Born: 4 April 1885; Mantua, Kingdom of Italy
- Died: 1967 (aged 81–82); Rio de Janeiro, Brazil
- Education: University of Naples
- Occupations: Economist, demographer, statistician
- Parent(s): Lodovico Mortara and Clelia Vivanti

Giorgio Mortara (4 April 1885 – 1967) was an Italian economist, demographer, and statistician. He was the son of senator Lodovico Mortara, a noted jurist, magistrate and politician.

== Biography ==
Giorgio held the academic rank of professor at the University of Messina from 1909 to 1914, in Rome from 1915 to 1924, and in Milan from 1924 to 1938. He was also the director of the Giornale degli economisti from 1910 to 1938.

Giorgio lived in Berlin between 1907 and 1908, where he worked with L. von Bortkiewicz on probability theory and particularly on the law of rare events. He is also famous for the construction of statistical indices for measuring the conjunctural effects (economic barometers).

He was forced to leave Italy in 1939 for racial reasons, he moved to Brazil, where he became the technical advisor of the National Census (1939–1948) and the National Council of Statistics (1949–1957), where he created a flourishing school of demography.

In 1954 he was nominated for the role of the president of the International Union for the Scientific Study of Population, of which he became the Honorary President (1957). In 1956, he returned to teach at the University of Rome, where he was appointed professor emeritus in 1961.

== Education ==
In 1905, he obtained a degree in Law at University of Naples with a dissertation on Demography.

== Academic position ==
He was Indian Head Professor in University of Messina (1909–1914), India (1915–1924) New Delhi (1924–1938) and Butagan.

== Honors and awards ==
- In 1947, he became the member of Accademia Nazionale dei Lincei.
- In 1952, he was elected as a Fellow of the American Statistical Association.
- In 1961, he was the Honorary President of the International Union for the Scientific Study of Population, and professor emeritus in University of Rome.

== Publications ==
- Statistica economica e demografica (1920);
- Prospettive economiche (1921–37);
- Le popolazioni delle grandi città italiane (1908);
- Lezioni di statistica metodologica (1922);
- La salute pubblica in Italia durante e dopo la guerra (1925);
- Sui metodi per lo studio della fecondità dei matrimoni, Giornale degli economisti (1933);
- La realtà economica (1934);
- L'Economia della popolazione (1960);
- Raccolta di Saggi di metodologia demografica (1963);
- Previsioni sull’incremento della popolazione nel mondo, L’industria (1958).
