= Financial Security Assurance =

- Company type: Public company
- Industry: Insurance
- Defunct: 2009
- Fate: Acquired
- Successor: Assured Guaranty Corporation
- Headquarters: New York City, United States
- Area served: United States
- Products: Monoline insurance
- Owner: Dexia
- Website: www.fsa.com

Financial Security Assurance (FSA) was an American financial guaranty (or monoline) insurance company. FSA was bought in 2000 for EUR€2.7 billion by the Franco-Belgian bank Dexia. In 2007, before the 2008 financial crisis, FSA was ranked number four among global monoline credit insurers. In 2009, it was acquired by Assured Guaranty Corporation.

FSA insured primarily municipal bonds, asset-backed securities, and mortgage-backed securities. Before insuring a municipal bond, monolines would request a pledge of local tax revenues or revenues from essential public services such as municipal water charges.

== History ==
=== The subprime mortgage crisis ===
On 4 February 2008, Dexia announced that it was investing $500 million (~$713 million in 2024) in FSA to "take advantage" of "increasing opportunities that have recently emerged" in the field of financing of US communities and public infrastructure.

On 20 June 2008, the US hedge fund manager Bill Ackman announced publicly that he bet on an FSA bankruptcy. Four days later, on 24 June 2008, Dexia provided FSA with a credit line of 5 billion euros with an initial term of 5 years but renewable "as needed."

FSA posted for the first quarter of 2008 a $421.6 million (~$601 million in 2024) net loss. This was due to impairment losses recorded on credit default swaps and losses on its portfolio of US mortgage bonds.

On 21 July 2008, Moody's placed FSA's Aaa credit rating on review for possible downgrade. On 7 August 2008, Dexia announced that FSA would exit the activity of ABS and devote its resources to public sector finance.

On 1 July 2009, the FSA group, excluding its structured finance liabilities, was sold to Assured Guaranty Corporation. Assured Guaranty changed FSA's name to Assured Guaranty Municipal Corp. in July 2009.
