= Opera Nazionale Combattenti =

Italian charitable organization

- Formation: 1917
- Dissolved: 1977
- Purpose: assistance to army veterans

The Opera Nazionale Combattenti was an Italian charitable organisation set up to provide assistance to veterans of the First World War. It was established in December 1917, in the immediate aftermath of the disastrous Italian defeat at the Battle of Caporetto (now Kobarid, Slovenia), and was intended both to improve the morale of soldiers in the army and to provide for their eventual return to civilian life. Francesco Saverio Nitti and Alberto Beneduce were influential in its establishment, and Beneduce was the first president.

In 1919 the association was divided into three sections: agrarian, financial, and social. The agrarian section co-ordinated the expropriation of agricultural land for re-distribution to ex-soldiers.

Under the Italian Fascist régime in the years following the First World War, the association was involved in the so-called Battle for Grain in 1926, and from 1928 in the drainage of the wetlands of the Agro Pontino as part of the so-called Battle for Land. After the Second World War it received land under the agricultural reforms of 1950.

The association was disbanded in 1977.
