= Sfil =

Financial institution in France

- Company type: Public bank
- Founded: 2013
- Headquarters: France
- Key people: Philippe Mills (CEO)
- Services: credit distribution export credit
- Net income: €69 million (2024)
- Total assets: €68.2 billion (2024)
- Total equity: €1.6 billion (2024)
- Owner: Caisse des dépôts et consignations (99.99%); Agence des participations de l'État (0.01%)
- Number of employees: 412 (2024)
- Subsidiaries: Caisse française de Financement Local
- Website: sfil.fr

Sfil, originally known as Société de financement local, is a French public development bank, founded in February 2013. It is active in local public sector financing and in the financing of major export credits contracts. Created as part of the reorganisation of the Franco-Belgian banking group Dexia, Sfil is wholly owned by the Caisse des dépôts et consignations, with the exception of one share held by the French State.

== History ==
=== 2013-2018; Early history ===
SFIL (Société de financement local) was created in 2013 following the process of overhauling Dexia, a Franco-Belgian bank. Part of the overhaul included the sale of its toxic loans to SFIL. It obtained an authorisation from the French Prudential Supervision and Resolution Authority, which allowed it to carry out banking activities. Following the introduction of European Banking Supervision in late 2014, it was designated a Significant Institution and is supervised by the European Central Bank.

It also mobilises long-term investors to offer local public entities, healthcare establishments and exporters terms to finance investments deemed essential for France.

In May 2015, the French government directed SFIL to expand its operations to refinancing of major export credit contracts (above 70 million euros) guaranteed by Bpifrance Assurance Export, the export guarantee arm of Bpifrance. The name change from Société de Financement Local to SFIL reflected that expansion of the bank's scope of activity. Also in 2015, the bank made profits for the first time.

=== 2018; Buyout by the Group Caisse des dépôts ===
In November 2018, the Caisse des dépôts et consignations group (CDC) announced the buyout of SFIL from the Agence des participations de l'État (APE), while its shareholding was split between CDC itself, which held 20%, the French State, which held 75% via the APE, and La Banque postale, which held the remaining 5%. It was a subject of negotiations between CDC and APE, during the takeover of CNP Assurances by La Banque postale. That year, SFIL declared a net banking income of €186 million and a net profit of €63 million. On 30 September 2020, CDC became SFIL's sole shareholder, with the exception of one ordinary share hold by the French State.

In 2019, the Caisse des Dépôts announced it would acquire all SFIL equity held by the French state and LBP, thus becoming the bank's sole shareholder except for a single share kept by the state. The transaction was completed in September 2020.

In 2023, export financing became its leading activity, with €6 billion worth of projects financed that year. As of summer 2024, total lending to the local public sector had exceeded €50 billion, of which €45 billion was allocated to local authorities. Green loans accounted for €1.15 billion while social loans, granted to local elected representatives to finance health, social and family action, reached €869 million.

== Financing activities ==
Sfil is a public development bank dedicated to French territorial collectivities, public hospitals and export, employing 400 people. Its mission is to "guarantee the stability in financing for the local public sector in France (...) and to enable local authorities to benefit from the best financing conditions". It thus finances the loans that its partner, La Banque postale, contracts with local authorities. These loans support projects that serve the public interest, such as the construction of schools, hospitals, sports facilities, or road infrastructure. Sfil is the leading financier, with €50 billion in long-term loans in 2023.

Since 2015, Sfil has also provided financing for major export contracts and in 2017 became the provider of liquidity for export credit. Prior to that time, the French State provided the guarantee on loans, but it was up to the contractor to find and negotiate with banks. By 2024, exports accounted for a third of Sfil's business. In 2024, Sfil announced that it had granted €3 billion in green loans, financing local projects to combat and adapt to climate change. Since October 2022, the financial institution has also been offering social loans, again in partnership with La Banque postale, to help local elected representatives to finance health, social or family programs.

== See also ==
- List of banks in France
- List of banks in the euro area
