= Giornale degli economisti e annali di economia =

Italian academic journal of economics

The Giornale degli economisti e Annali di economia, established in Padua in 1875, is an Italian academic journal of economics. It publishes research articles in English and Italian. The owner of the publication is Università Commerciale Luigi Bocconi and it is published by Egea, the university's publishing house.

== History ==
=== First series (Paduan series) ===
The inception of the journal dates back to April 1875 when the Associazione per il progresso degli studi economici in Italia decided to turn the Rassegna di agricoltura, industria e commercio of the Società di incoraggiamento di Padova in its official organ. The title chosen for the new journal was Giornale degli economisti. Eugenio Forti was confirmed as its director . In the early issues of the journal writers would include Fedele Lampertico, Luigi Luzzatti, Antonio Scialoja, that is to say the most eminent names of the newly formed association.

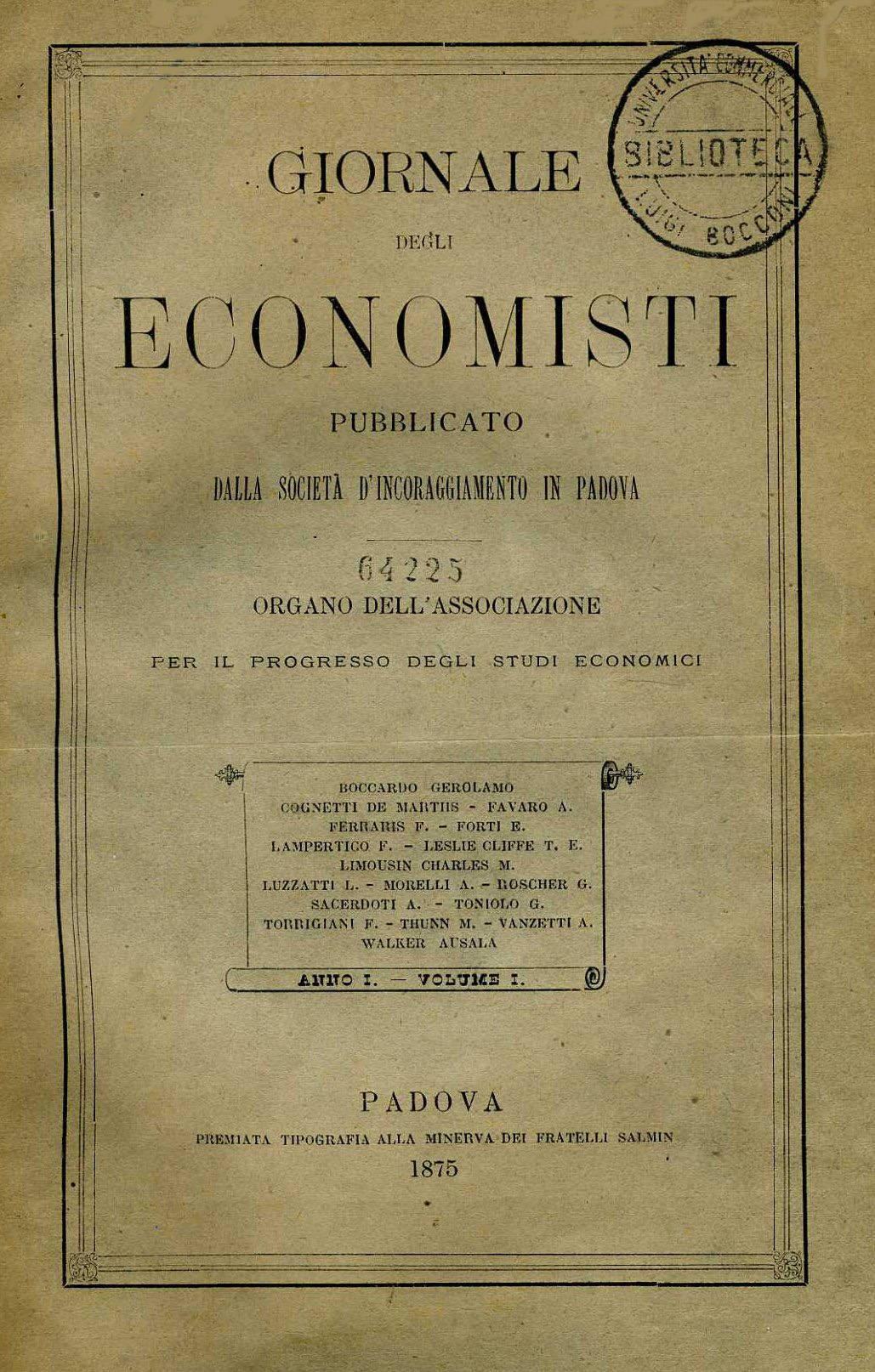
Giornale degli economisti first issue

The main themes of the Giornale degli economisti are the social sciences, but there are also articles on economic theory. The orientation of the journal is in defense of protectionism and in favor of legislative action in the field of social security and labor protection. The most discussed issue is that of women and child labor in factories. Luzzatti, who had also sponsored an industrial survey from Italian Parliament, wrote several times on these topics. Between 1876 and 1878, the Giornale degli economisti published both a review of legislation in other European countries on women and child labor, and several investigations on the working conditions in several Italian cities. The journal, on the basis of military, health and moral considerations, called for legislative action in order to limit the work of married women and children. At least a law prohibiting employment for married women in the period immediately before and after childbirth was requested. The journal's requests were in open opposition to the Società Adam Smith's dominant liberal views as expressed in its official journal: the weekly Florentine journal L'Economista. During those years consensus around Smithian free trade increased and the Giornale degli economisti ended up being cut off. The journal and its economists were perceived as austere but antiquated, "dressed up in winter clothes during summer weather." As a consequence, in 1879, only four years after its inception, the publication of the Giornale degli economisti ended.

=== Second series (Bologna and Rome series) ===
Publication of the Giornale degli economisti resumed in Bologna in 1886 by Alberto Zorli. Zorli was then lecturer in public finance at the University of Bologna, and there had the idea to start up the Padua journal once again. According to his plans, "while remaining faithful to the principles of the Padua journal, this Bologna journal would particularly aim to settle controversies among economists, and to become a real gym for all opinions but subversive opinions." The new journal would soon receive support by many of the leading Italian economists. The frequency went from bi-monthly to monthly and a few years later the management of the journal moved to Rome, even though printing continued to rely on the Fava & Garagnani typography in Bologna. The aim of the new series was increasingly to promote a comparison between protectionists and free traders. Next to protectionists Eugenio Forti and Fedele Lampertico, the Giornale degli economisti added new signatures of the Società Adam Smith founder Tullio Martello and the brilliant young liberal Maffeo Pantaleoni. Pantaleoni worked on the journal's financial review page as well. The conciliatory formula for "gym of ideas" proved successful and after a few years the Giornale degli economisti ceased to be unprofitable. But soon the journal's editorial line changed. In 1890 Zorli was joined in management by Maffeo Pantaleoni, Antonio De Viti De Marco and Ugo Mazzola, the three of them also acquiring 3/4 of the journal's property. The three had long entertained the idea of creating a new journal close to the Marginalist economic school of which the three of them were members. They decided, however, to give up the idea, focusing instead upon the Zorli journal. The difference in orientation between the directors was evident and soon Zorli would end up being more and more marginalized. In short, the first director realized that he was "a fish out of water," the newspaper got out of his hand and the proximity to Marginalism became more marked each year. The political orientation of the Giornale degli economisti changed as well. It became liberal, anti-protectionist and anti-socialist. The journal supported the positions of the Associazione economica liberale italiana whose president was Pantaleoni. Editors of the Giornale degli economisti opposed the customs tariff and the traditional historical left's trade wars with France. They sympathized with Napoleone Colajanni and the extreme political left in contrast with Francesco Crispi. They fought strenuously against Crispi during the Banca Romana scandal. There was a new purpose in style as well: the journal was committed to "dealing with as much as [we can] topical issues of art and economic, with special attention to the problems of economic policy that are stirred up in Italy [...] pure science is not excluded. It is simply not at the forefront". Consistent with the new line, a new Cronaca politica page was inserted into the journal. The page was edited by Mazzola first and then, from 1893, by Vilfredo Pareto. During those years, the most successful period of the Giornale degli economisti began. Yet both Pareto and Pantaleoni suffered oppositions and hostilities in their academic careers for their anti-government and intransigent positions in the journal. Fellowship between the authors that had made the success of the Giornale degli economisti broke during last years of the century. Mazzola died in 1899, when he was only 35 years old, Pantaleoni started to walk away, and Pareto's collaboration stopped as well after being accused for his Cronaca politica page "of injuring rather than reasoning, and therefore unconvincing." Starting in 1897 De Viti De Marco remained virtually the only director of the journal. The journal's editorial policy was revised, only short articles were published with issues not exceeding 90 pages. Furthermore, the Giornale degli economisti lessened the liberalism that had distinguished it in recent years. So wide was the change that, during 1900, in part due to looming financial difficulties, a merger with the journal that for many years had been opposing it seemed possible: La riforma sociale.

=== Third series (Rome Series) ===
In the first decade of the twentieth century the journal, increasingly less committed to political analysis, opened its pages to the collaboration of a new generation of scholars. In 1910 the ownership of the journal was purchased by Alberto Beneduce and Giorgio Mortara, who, together with Pantaleoni, would also assume the journal management. This is how the third series of the journal started, and to the title "Rivista di statistica" was added. And it is quite understandable: both Beneduce that Mortara were statisticians and the use of quantitative methods for dealing with economic problems was increasing. Beneduce had started to work with the journal in 1904, with articles on demography and statistics. Then, attracted by politics, he walked away from academic studies and from the journal, even if formally retaining its co-direction. Mortara instead kept on directing the journal and managed to move it out of the difficult financial period following the First World War. Despite budget difficulties Mortara managed to keep up the international scientific prestige of the journal while managing to attract new famous foreign collaborators such as Eugen Slutsky.

=== Fourth series (Milan series) ===
Meanwhile, in 1922 Mortara moved from Rome to Milan, where he was called to teach in the new Faculty of Law at the University of Milan and then to direct the statistical institute at Bocconi University. The journal management would then be moved to Milan, starting the third series of the journal in 1923. A double mourning almost immediately marked the new series. In 1924, in fact both the main contributors of Giornale degli economisti died: Pantaleoni and Pareto. Two special commemorative issues would be published in memory of them. Instead of Pantaleoni, the journal's management would be taken over by Gustavo Del Vecchio, while the journal shares owned by the Pantaleoni went to his daughter Marcella Tommasini Pantaleoni. Like all Italian publishing, after Fascist laws regarding the press, the journal was forced to compromise and take particular precautions. Some articles were clearly similar to the policies of the Fascist regime. In any case, the independence of articles of a more technical nature, such as those regarding Statistics, managed to be safeguarded. Even without exposing itself too much, the Giornale degli economisti continued to host even opponents of the regime. Antonio Graziadei, Ugo La Malfa, and even Ferruccio Parri collaborated with the journal – the latter signed with the initials FP or under the pseudonym "Any reader". The Gionale degli economisti's formula of cautious independence seemed to work and during the years of the regime publication of the journal was allowed without major interference until 1938, when a particularly difficult period began for the Giornale degli economisti. In the fall of that year the enforcement of racial laws forced the removal of teachers of Jewish origin from schools and universities. Many at Bocconi hoped for smooth application of the law. Instead, both Del Vecchio and Mortara had to be removed from Bocconi University and from the Giornale degli economisti. The first reaction was Mortara to think of closing the Journal. He could not bear the idea that the Giornale degli economisti would fall into the hands of those who had wanted the racial laws: "Alongside the four children who followed him to Brazil, there was a son of intellect that he could not migrate, and it was the Journal. The Mortara's impulse was to suppress it." Mortara wrote: "I hope to see Beneduce within one month and convert him to the thesis of euthanasia for the Giornale degli economisti. It seems to me the only dignified solution: hara-kiri in Japanese. "

A statement addressed to subscribers was added to the November–December 1938 issue. It announced the ceasing of publication. As a justification on the last page a communication read: "the work of Italian economists was lost in recent years, in too many review journals." Still the same communication announced that Mortara and the journal management board had authorized Bocconi University to add to its Annali di economia the subtitle Giornale degli economisti. But many economists close to the Fascist regime intended to take over the journal. The most interested seem to be three intellectuals close to the regime: Alberto De Stefani, Luigi Amoroso and Felice Vinci. The three ran the Rivista italiana di scienze economiche which, since its founding years in the thirties, had not been particularly fortunate. Therefore, the opportunity to merge it with Giornale degli economisti seemed very attractive. The journal in De Stefani's plans was supposed to become the organ of a newly formed economic society that he would direct. However, the intervention of Giovanni Gentile, vice president of Bocconi University during those years, with his authority would ward off De Stefani's plans. Gentile had moved following an opposite plan compared to the operation imagined by Mortara. In the merger of the Giornale degli economisti and Annali di economia the former would no longer have to cease publication, but the latter. The Giornale degli economisti would be transferred, free of any charge, to Bocconi University. Thereby safeguarding the name of the journal with the longest tradition and providing a solution preserving its independence and scientific rigor. The first to accept the plan was Del Vecchio, followed by Mortara and Beneduce. The more reluctant to accept was the daughter of Pantaleoni, still co-owner of the journal, who stubbornly defended closing the journal as the best way to defend her father's journal from fascist ambitions. Equally important was the strong support of the operation by Bocconi University Rector Giovanni Demaria, who directed the new series starting in 1939, now called Giornale degli economisti' e Annali di economia.

=== New series (Bocconi University) ===
The first months of the new series seemed to be going well, but with the start of the war the Giornale degli economisti came into collision with Fascism. The economic policy of the regime became the target of growing criticism by increasingly less veiled articles. Articles in this sense appeared signed by Costantino Bresciani Turroni and Luigi Einaudi. Agostino Lanzillo wrote about the probability of defeat in the economic conditions in which Italy was entering the war. But there were two articles, one by Demaria and especially one by Epicarmo Corbino, which raised the regime's hackles against the Giornale degli economisti. Corbino's analysis of merchant vessels was merciless: in the event of a long war the Japanese and the Italian navy were likely to decline to a negligible entity, while the Anglo-American would present a net increase starting in 1943. To worsen the situation, there was a radio broadcast of American propaganda, intercepted by Italian security services, in which Corbino's article was widely quoted. Thus, when in May 1942 Demaria's speech during a conference attacked Fascist autarky and proposed the return to economic freedom and an opening to international trade, the regime's reaction was prompt. Demaria' s report was not published among the conference proceedings and the direction of the Giornale degli economisti, starting from the July–August 1942 issue, was entrusted to Bocconi University Rector Paolo Greco. The change of direction was not enough to guarantee tranquility to the Giornale degli economist e Annali di economia. Following a review signed "GD" the journal was seized "for anti-patriotic American propaganda" and the consequences for Demaria would have been even worse had it not been for the Gentile's intervention with Bottai and Mussolini. The publication of the Giornale degli economisti e Annali di economia resumed in 1946. The numbering shown on the first issue is January / February 1943-January/February 1946 in order to emphasize the continuity after its suspension. Demaria came back to management.

The Giornale degli economisti after World War II was able to attract many foreign scholars and to internationalize its research. Since the seventies, contributions written in English increased constantly. Articles by Franco Modigliani, Duncan Black, Jan Tinbergen, François roux, Gerhard Tintner, Fritz Machlup, Oskar Morgenstern appeared in the journal. Of great importance in 1952 would be a report by Marco Fanno at the first meeting of the Società italiana degli economisti and an article by Bruno De Finetti introducing the Arrow-Pratt's theorem. In 1956 Demaria's report to the second meeting of Società italiana degli economisti was published, in which the external causation of economic cycles was theorized. From this report and a subsequent article the Ricerche di cinematica storica would originate, produced by working groups of students and partially published in the Giornale degli economist e Annali di economia from 1964 to 1973. After the withdrawal of Demaria in 1976, the management of the Giornale degli economist e Annali di economia was taken on by Innocenzo Gasparini, who had succeeded Demaria as professor of Economic Policy. Gasparini had started working with the Giornale degli economisti in 1947 with the article Nota critica sulla tesi hayekiana dell'effetto di Ricardo, and entrusted to the Journal an article Considerazioni sul ruolo dell'imprenditorialità, published a few months before his death in 1985. Gasparini's successor was Mario Monti who had been a student of his. After Monti, the journal directors would be Franco Bruni and Michele Polo. In recent years, all Giornale degli economist e Annali di economia articles appear in English. The main areas of interest are now: 1 - economic policy issues of importance to the Italian economic debate 2 - Critical Studies on recent developments in the theoretical and empirical literature. The journal is open to economists of any movement. The only discriminating factor for acceptance, as it had been during the period of Demaria and as confirmed by the editorial line, is the scientific value of the articles.

== Editors-in-chief ==
The following persons have been editors-in-chief of the journal:

- 1875-1879 Eugenio Forti
- 1886-1889 Alberto Zorli
- Alberto Zorli 1890-1909 (until 1897), Maffeo Pantaleoni, Antonio De Viti De Marco, Ugo Mazzola (until 1897)
- 1910-1938 Giorgio Mortara, Maffeo Pantaleoni (until 1924), Gustavo Del Vecchio (1925), Antonio De Viti De Marco (until 1913), Alberto Beneduce
- 1939-1942 Giovanni Demaria
- 1942 Paolo Greco
- 1946-1975 Giovanni Demaria
- 1976-1984 Innocenzo Gasparini
- 1985-1995 Mario Monti
- 1996-2003 Franco Bruni
- 2004–present Michele Polo
