= ARCO Group =

ARCO Group is a Belgian cooperative holding group, and part of the Catholic workers organisation Beweging.net formerly known as ACW. The group has more than 900,000 shareholders and a capital of 4.5 billion euro. Arcofin invests in the financial sector and Auxipar mainly invests in basic and utility service sectors (Elia, SPGE, Belgacom, Telenet, GIMV), and real estate (Retail Estates). In addition the group participates in the cooperative organisations Hefboom and Crédal and the non-profit organisations Procura and Syneco. Francine Swiggers is Chairman of the Management Board of the ARCO Group, she succeeded Rik Branson.

== History ==
In 1935 the Landelijk Verbond van Christelijke Coöperaties (LVCC) (E: Rural League of Christian Cooperations) was established. The LVCC later became shareholder of Catholic organisations such as the Welvaart (E: Prosperity) grouping of cooperative shops, the BAC-Centrale Depositokas and the Antwerpse Volksspaarkas, De Volksverzekering and the Centre for insurance of risks of Christian working-class families In 1945 the LVCC, together with the verbondelijke coöperatieve vennootschappen is embedded within the ACW. LVCC will acquire shares in publishing, printing, and travel companies. In 1974, the investment company Auxipar is established and in 1983 Coplus (forerunner of Arcoplus).

In 1990 the LVCC is restructured and renamed Arcofin CV. As a result of the reorganisation, 28 cooperative corporations are merged and the resulting group is named ARCO Group. In 1997, ARCO Group prepares for the takeover of Paribas (Belgium, Netherlands) by BACOB. In 1999 the financial and insurance activities are group in the Artesia Banking Corporation and in 2001 Arcofin gives its shares in Artesia Banking Corporation to Dexia in return for shares of Dexia.

In 2010 it suffered substantial losses as a result of a restructuring and part nationalisation of Dexia.

In 2016, the Belgian jurist and author, Drieu Godefridi, published an opinion on the website of the magazine Le Vif in which he considered that the compensation of ARCO cooperators for an amount of 600 million euros by the Belgian State is crony capitalism. In fact, the Leterme government, whose Prime Minister was Yves Leterme in the CD&V-MR-PS-cdH-Open VLD coalition, extended the bank guarantee of 100,000 euros to ARCO's 780,000 cooperators, mostly Flemish, following the failure of the Belgian bank Dexia, of which ARCO was one of the main shareholders and also the financial arm of the Algemeen Christelijk Werknemersverbond (Christian Workers' Movement in Flanders) linked to the political party CD&V.

== See also ==
- Almanij
- Confederation of Christian Trade Unions

== Sources ==
- "Dexia-dochter Groep Arco haalt vers geld op". Het Nieuwsblad.
