= Crediop =

Italian banking institution

Dexia Crediop S.p.A.
- Formerly: Consorzio di Credito per le Opere Pubbliche; Crediop S.p.A.
- Type: Subsidiary
- Industry: Financial services
- Founded: 1919; 107 years ago
- Founder: Alberto Beneduce
- Defunct: September 30, 2023
- Fate: merged with Dexia as part of Dexia's orderly resolution plan
- Headquarters: 15 via Flavia, Rome, Italy
- Net income: ▲ (€28,677,728) (2015)
- Total assets: ▼€25,112,916,676 (2015)
- Total equity: ▼€910,203,407 (2015)
- Owner: Dexia; (70%); Banco BPM; (20%); BPER Banca; (10%)
- Parent: Dexia
- Capital ratio: ▼15.61% (CET1)
- Website: Official website

Dexia Crediop S.p.A. was an Italian bank specializing in financing public infrastructure which was part of Dexia Group, and disappeared in 2023 in the context of Dexia's orderly resolution plan.

== History ==
Consorzio di Credito per le Opere Pubbliche (Crediop) was found by Alberto Beneduce in 1919 as a public entity.

=== Sanpaolo Bank ===
The privatization was started in late 1980s. In 1989 Istituto Bancario San Paolo di Torino was the second largest owner for 35%, which was purchased from Istituto Nazionale della Previdenza Sociale and Istituto Nazionale Assicurazioni, with Cassa Depositi e Prestiti (CDP) retained 60.7%. In late 1991 Sanpaolo Group bought 50% ownership from CDP. Due to Legge Amato, In 1992 it became a società per azioni (limited company) from statutory corporation , which San Paolo Bank Holding S.p.A. (52.3%), Istituto Bancario San Paolo di Torino S.p.A. (37%) and Cassa Depositi e Prestiti S.p.A. (10.7%) were the shareholders. In 1995 the bank was wholly owned by Sanpaolo bank group. The bank followed the parent company to merge with Istituto Mobiliare Italiano to form Sanpaolo IMI in 1998.

=== Dexia ===
Circa 1997 Dexia acquired 40% shares from Sanpaolo. In 1999 the banking group sold an additional 20% shares to Dexia for €218 million, making Dexia became the major shareholder for 60%. Sanpaolo IMI sold further 40% shares to Dexia for about €403 million, However, Dexia re-sold the 40% shares to Banca Popolare di Verona – Banco SGSP (became part of Banco Popolare in 2007), Banca Popolare di Milano, Banca Popolare dell'Emilia Romagna and Banca Popolare di Bergamo – Credito Varesino (through BPB Partecipazioni), by buying 4% shares and convertible bonds equivalent to 6% share capital, for a total of 200 billion lire each (about €103 million for each bank). Banca Popolare di Bergamo withdrew in 2001.

During the 2008 financial crisis, the parent company Dexia entered severe financial difficulties and received a €6 billion bailout from the French, Belgian and Luxembourgish governments. In 2011, Dexia suffered big losses due to the European debt crisis and the debt haircut on Greek government bonds, leading to the design of an orderly resolution plan for the Dexia Group, validated by the European Commission in 2012. As part of this resolution plan, Dexia Crediop

Dexia Crediop ceased to exist on 30 September 2023 when Dexia Crédit Local finalised the merger by absorption of Dexia Crediop : this absorption of its 100%-owned Italian subsidiary (Dexia Crediop) takes place within the framework of the simplification of the Dexia group structure in preparation for the withdrawal of Dexia Crédit Local's banking licence.

== See also ==
- Cassa Depositi e Prestiti
- List of banks in Italy
