= Banque Internationale à Luxembourg =

Bank in Luxembourg

Banque internationale du Luxembourg

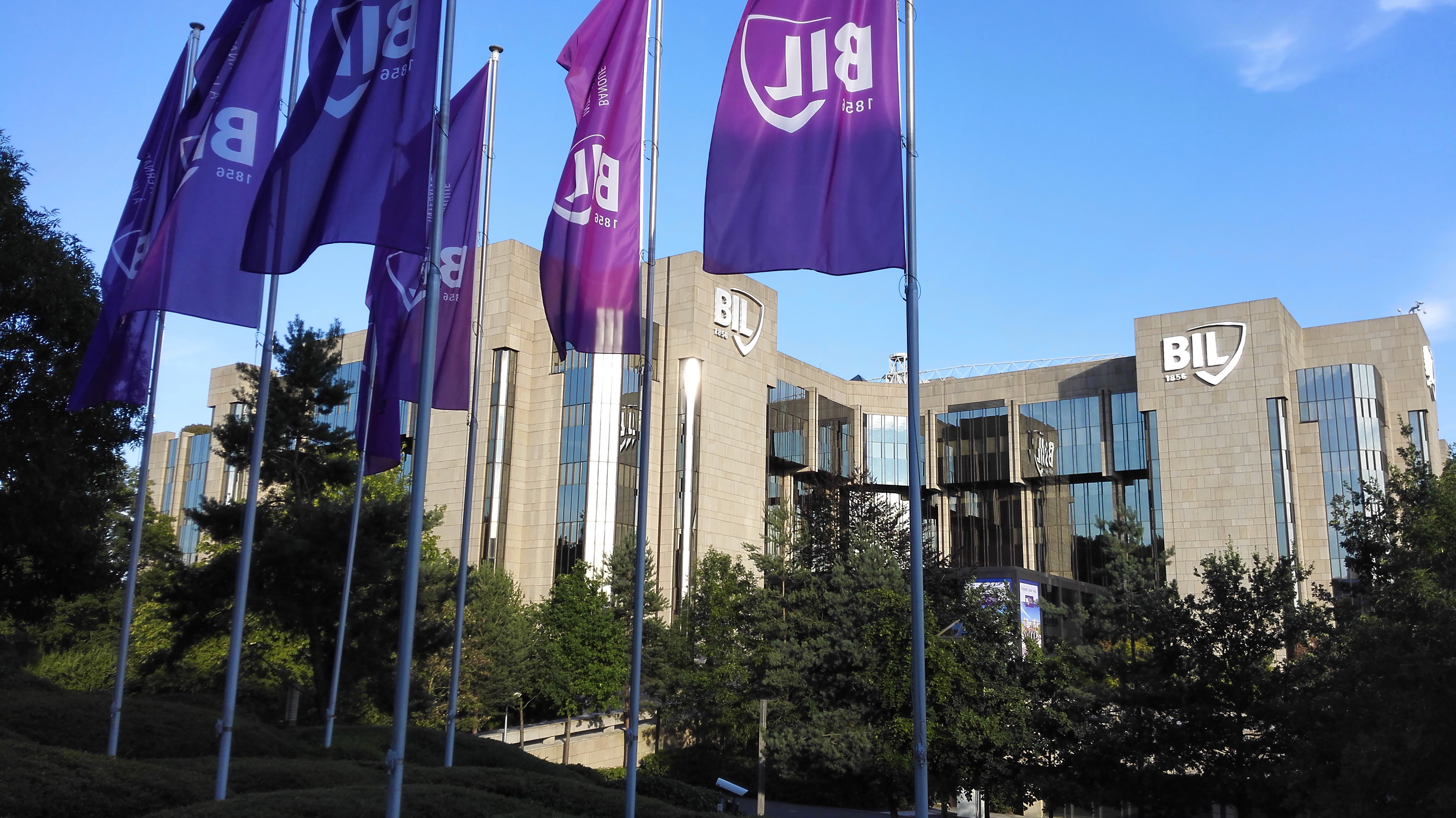
- Head office of BIL on 69, route d’Esch in Luxembourg City
- Type: Private
- Industry: Banking
- Founded: 1856; 170 years ago
- Headquarters: Luxembourg
- Products: Corporate banking Commercial banking
- Total assets: €50 billion (Q4 2025)
- Owner: Legend Holdings (89.980%); Luxembourg government (9.998%)
- Number of employees: 2000 (2022)
- Website: www.bil.com

Banque Internationale à Luxembourg S.A. (BIL, "International Bank in Luxembourg": Luxembourgish: International Bank zu Lëtzebuerg) is the oldest private bank in Luxembourg. It offers commercial and corporate banking services, and was the country's third-largest employer by 2011, with 3,640 employees. Since 2018, it has been majority-owned by China-headquartered Legend Holdings. The bank has offices in Luxembourg, Switzerland and China.

BIL has been designated in 2018 as a Significant Institution under the criteria of European Banking Supervision, and as a consequence is directly supervised by the European Central Bank.

== History ==
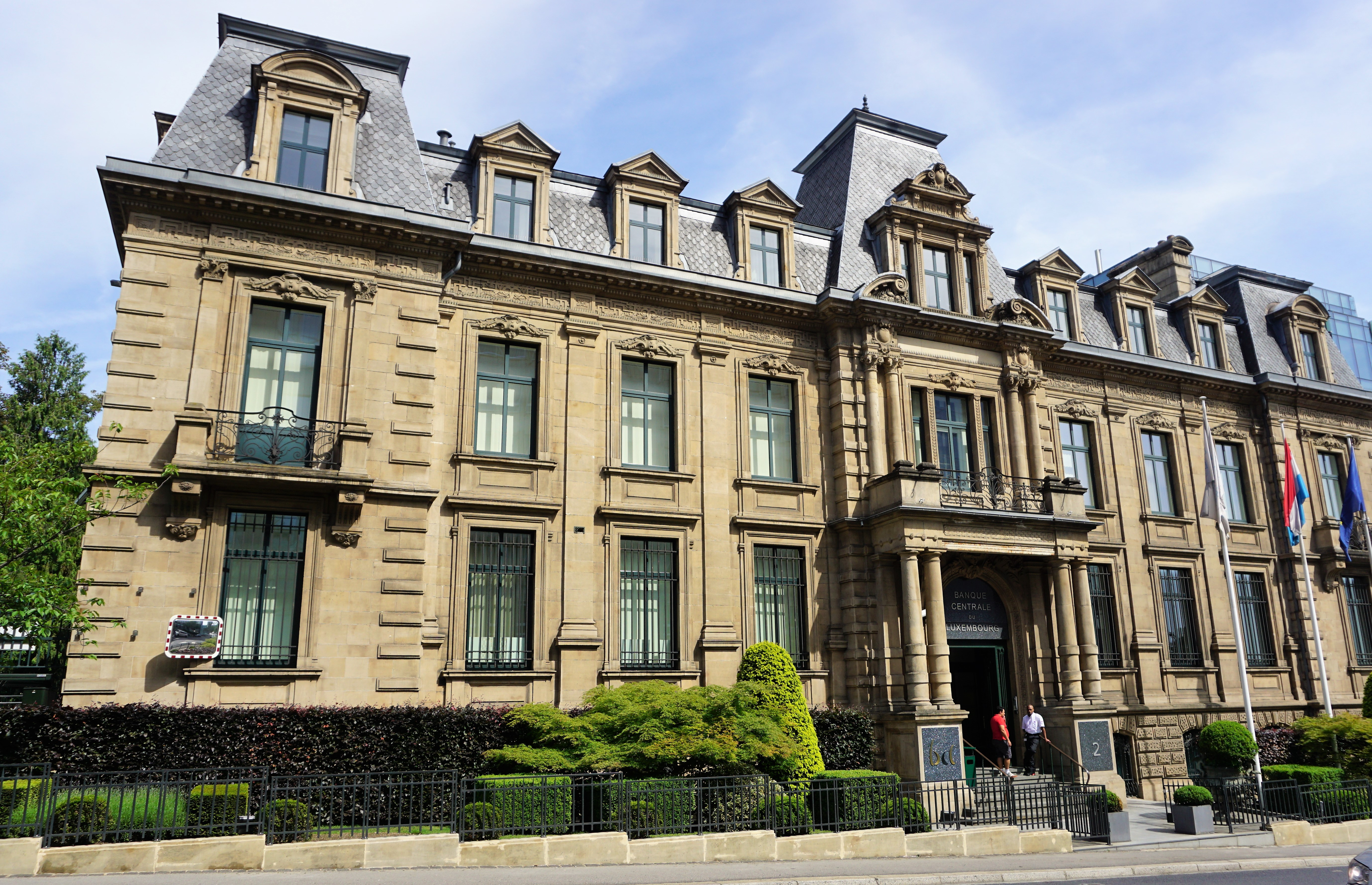
Former BIL head office on 2, Boulevard Royal, built in 1902 and purchased in 1998 by the newly created Central Bank of Luxembourg

The bank was founded on 8 March 1856, with involvement of leading financiers Gustav Mevissen, Abraham Oppenheim, and the Pereire brothers. Its initial shareholders included the banking houses Emile Erlanger & Co. (40 percent), Sal. Oppenheim (16 percent), and A. Schaaffhausen'scher Bankverein (16 percent). Its first counter opened on 31 July 1856, the first in Luxembourg and a fortnight before the opening of the rival state-owned Banque et Caisse d'Épargne de l'État. Deposits reached a million francs in 1869 and 100 million in 1916.

Like other banks in the German Confederation, BIL issued banknotes in multiple currencies including the Belgian franc, Dutch guilder, Prussian thaler, and Rhineland thaler. In 1914, the BIL's notes became legal tender in Luxembourg. After World War I, Belgium's Banque de Bruxelles became a significant shareholder together with Paris-based Banque de l'Union Parisienne, joined in 1926 by Germany's Dresdner Bank.

Edmond Israel was CEO of the bank from 1973 to 1989. Starting in 1976, BIL acquired the Luxembourg subsidiary of Belgium's Banque Lambert, initially founded in 1961 as Banque Européenne du Luxembourg, and fully absorbed it in 1979. In 1982, it opened a subsidiary in Singapore. In 1983, Groupe Bruxelles Lambert and Pargesa Holding, both controlled by Belgian financier Albert Frère, in turn acquired minority stakes in the equity of BIL. In 1991, Crédit Communal de Belgique acquired 25 percent of the capital of BIL, and in 1992 raised its stake to 51 percent. By the mid-1990s, BIL was the largest bank in Luxembourg, with 46 branches in the country.

In 1998, BIL acquired the Banque Industrielle et Immobilière Privée (BIMP). Crédit Communal de Belgique, which had become Dexia in 1996, acquired full ownership of BIL in 1999. In the 2000, the Dexia brand replaced the former BIL identity.

In 1997, BIL opened new branches in Dublin, Singapore and the Cayman Islands to "satisfy a new demand [...] in cross-cultural transactions".

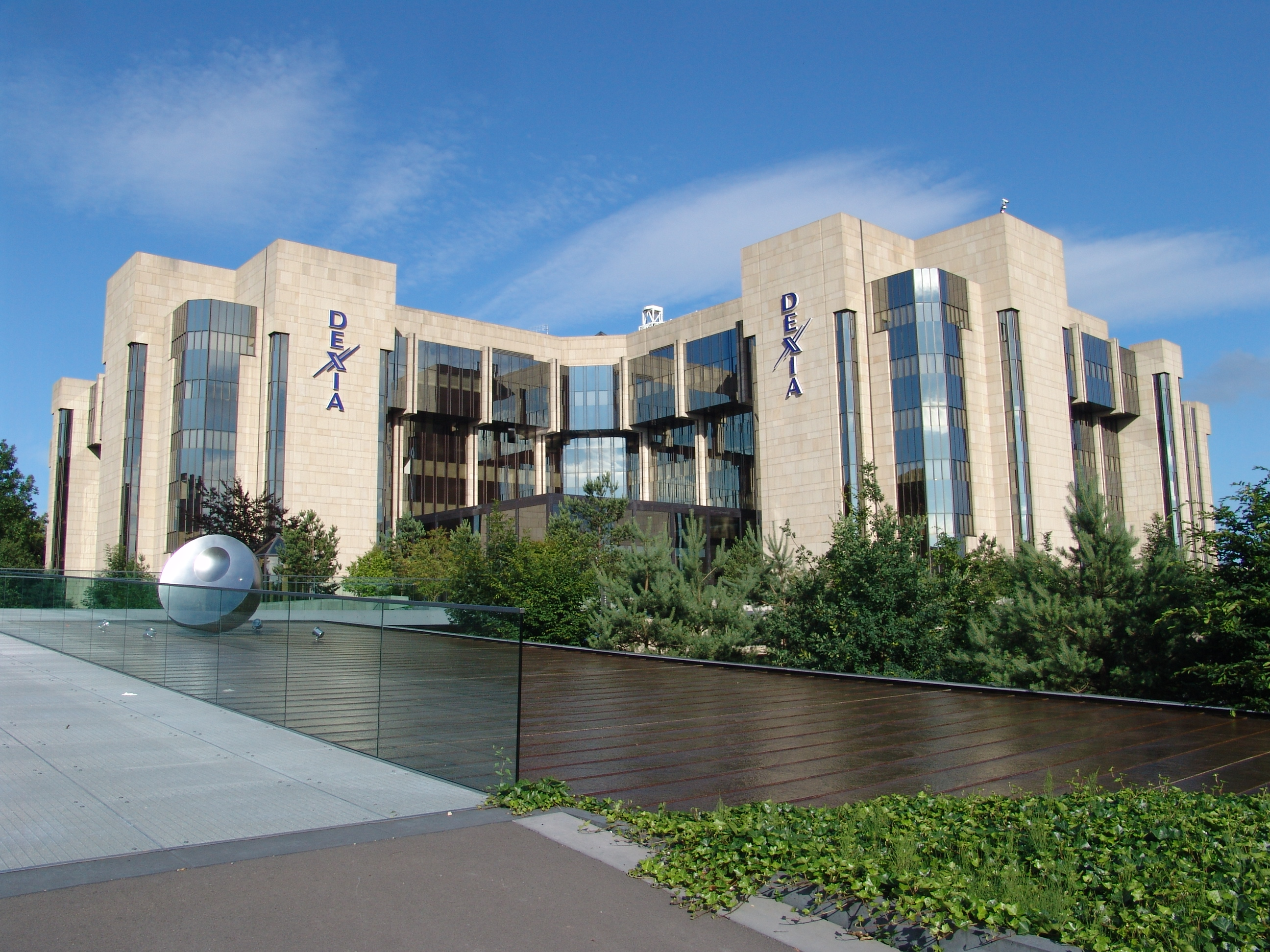
The BIL head office with Dexia branding, photographed in 2008

In 2011, François Pauly was appointed CEO of Dexia BIL. In 2012 Dexia sold a 90 percent stake in BIL for €730 million to Precision Capital, which also owned KBL European Private Bankers, while the Luxembourg government retained a 10 percent stake. In 2014, Hugues Delcourt was appointed CEO of BIL. In 2015, the BIL closed its Singapore subsidiary.

In 2017, the Chinese investment company Legend Holdings announced it was acquiring Precision Capital's 90% stake in the bank for €1.484 billion. In July 2018, the acquisition, notified through the Luxembourg regulator (CSSF), was approved by the European Central Bank.

In 2020, the bank reported a decrease of 10% of its annual results.

In September 2026, Legend Holding launched the sale of its share of Banque Internationale à Luxembourg.

== Controversy ==
In August 2020, Luxembourg's Commission de Surveillance du Secteur Financier imposed a large fine of 4.6 million euro on BIL, following inspection of the bank's AMLCFT systems in 2017 and 2018.

In 2024, the U.K.'s National Crime Agency found that BIL played a "central role" in helping Jahangir Hajiyev, former chairman of the International Bank of Azerbaijan, to move embezzled funds.

Luc Frieden was chairman of BIL from 2016 to March 2023, before becoming Prime Minister of Luxembourg in October 2023.

== Head office ==
The bank originally operated in the Ville Haute, on rue Notre-Dame. In 1902 it relocated to the mansion on 2, Boulevard Royal, designed by architects Pierre and Paul Funck. In 1989 it moved to its current head office on route d'Esch. It also maintained a branch in the Ville Haute at the southeastern corner of rue Aldringen and avenue Monterey, later used as seat of Dexia Luxembourg.

== See also ==
- Banque et Caisse d'Épargne de l'État
- List of banks in the euro area
- List of banks in Luxembourg
