= Jean-Baptiste de Franssu =

French economist

Jean-Baptiste Douville de Franssu (born July 8, 1963) is a French investment management and banking professional.

He has been chairman of the supervisory board of the Istituto per le Opere di Religione (IOR, in English "Institute for Works of Religion" or the Vatican bank), since July 9, 2014.

He was chief executive officer of Invesco Europe, the European subsidiary of global investment management company, Invesco, and a member of its global executive management committee, from 1990 until the end of October 2011, during which time he led the firm's expansion in Europe.

== Career ==
De Franssu began his career as a journalist with INVESTIR, a monthly French business and finance magazine. He joined Groupe Caisse des Dépôts et Consignations (CDC) as a manager in 1987.

He joined Invesco France as a managing director in 1990, moving up to become CEO of Invesco Europe in 1997, where he led the group's expansion in Europe until 2011. By this time, Invesco Europe's assets under management had grown from zero to $35bn (€24bn).

In June 2007, he was elected vice president of the European Fund and Asset Management Association, the pan-European investment industry association, and was then elected president for a term from June 2009 until June 2011.

Following his role at Invesco, he was a consultant adviser on cross-border M&A transactions before taking up non-executive management roles with a number of financial services companies.

In March 2014, Pope Francis appointed him to the newly created Pontifical Commission for Reference on the Organisation of the Economic-Administrative Structure of the Dicasteries of the Roman Curia, the Institutions linked to the Holy See, and the Vatican City State. He resigned from the commission in September 2014 following his nomination as chairman of the supervisory board of the Istituto per le Opere di Religione. The institute published its annual report with financial statements for 2019 in June 2020.

In May 2015, Groupe La Française, the investment management subsidiary of the French banking group Credit Mutuel du Nord, appointed him to its supervisory board. He became a non-executive member of the board of Kneip S.A., a data management and reporting solutions provider for investment management and insurance companies, in October 2017.

== Other roles and honours ==
De Franssu was chosen as 'European Personality of the Year' by Funds Europe magazine in 2009.
