= Tom Flannery =

American dramatist

- Born: July 12, 1966 (age 60); Scranton, Pennsylvania, United States
- Occupations: Singer, composer, playwright
- Known for: Tom Flannery and the Shillelaghs
- Website: tomflannery.com

Tom Flannery (born July 12, 1966) is an American singer-songwriter and playwright from Scranton, Pennsylvania, United States. AllMusic has called him "one of the most gifted songwriters to emerge at the turn of the century."

== Career ==
After three critically acclaimed albums, 1998's Song About a Train (which featured singer/songwriter Neal Casal and keyboardist John Ginty), The Anthracite Shuffle in 2000, and 2002's solo acoustic Drinking With Nick Drake, he started the (now defunct) website Songaweek.com with friend and fellow songwriter Lorne Clarke as a venue to release all his new music digitally. In the five years between 2003 and 2008 he recorded and made available at least one brand new song per week, frequently writing about current events. The Anthracite Shuffle, a concept album dealing with the history of coal mining in Northeastern Pennsylvania, was inspired by a 1996 journey to Houston which Flannery found strikingly flat and level compared to his mountainous home.

In 2005 he contributed a solo acoustic version of the song "Boom Boom Mancini" to a Warren Zevon tribute album called Hurry Home Early: The Songs of Warren Zevon. Splendid Magazine called the performance "bone-chilling.....(it) marks the disc's pinnacle. Whereas Zevon's versions paint Mancini as a modern-day folk hero, Flannery's haunting vocal delivery gives the boxer's story a terrifying, stone-cold killer interpretation."

In 2006 he co-wrote the soundtrack for the award-winning feature-length documentary Facing Sudan. In addition, he contributed several songs in 2008 for the short documentary Crayons and Paper, a follow-up to Facing Sudan.

Connections Magazine called his music "dark and expressive, glorious and sobering… delicately haunting slice(s) of passion-laden songwriting. …Immediate and gripping, akin to sitting in a living room at the feet of grizzled troubadours like Steve Earle or Bruce Springsteen, soaking in the wisdom of a life perhaps not so clean but still crying out for redemption."

His produced plays include The Driveway (directed by Pulitzer Prize winning dramatist and Academy Award-nominated actor Jason Miller), God Bless Roy Campanella, Spanish Lady: Reflections on 1918 , God and the Ghost of Woody Guthrie, The Katrina Monologues, Marcinkus and The Last Thoughts of Gino Merli. In September 2007 The Last Thoughts of Gino Merli was adapted into a PBS documentary called Gino Merli: The Healing Hero.

In 2012 he released a full band record called Teen Angst and the Green Flannel, a song cycle written from the perspective of a 17-year-old boy. OurTownRadio.net wrote that "“This is bona-fide rock n' roll soul food. “Teen angst and the green flannel” kicks in the door as well as anything done by the stooges and the who in their primes.." It was the first of 3 records by his band Tom Flannery and the Shillelaghs.

This first full band record was followed up by a trilogy of duo records made with Bret Alexander, the primary songwriter and guitarist of the Pennsylvania roots rock band The Badlees.

His latest release is 2026's Floods, Pills, Forsaken People and More Songs About Trains, a collection of solo acoustic tracks

Since 2021 he has been writing on online column on Substack called "Scranton Time - Bits and Pieces from Tom Flannery"

== Discography ==
=== Solo ===
Studio albums

- Song About a Train (1998)
- The Anthracite Shuffle (2000)
- Drinking With Nick Drake (2002)
- Civil War Battle Ballads (2008)
- Teen Angst and the Green Flannel (with the Shillelaghs) (2012)
- Love and Streets (2012)
- Dupont Back Porches (with Bret Alexander) (2016)
- Tales from PA 6 (with Bret Alexander) (2018)
- Peace and Love and Dollar Pints (with the Shillelaghs) (2019)
- "downhill" (with Bret Alexander) (2020)
- A Good Night Was Had For Days (with the Shillelaghs) (2024)
- Floods, Pills, Forsaken People and More Songs About Trains (2026)

== Plays ==
- Marcinkus
- The Last Thoughts of Gino Merli
- The Driveway
- Beckett and Ernie
- Spanish Lady: Reflections on 1918
- Fight Like Hell Till You Get to Heaven
- Screwing Agnes
- God Bless Roy Campanella
- Mary on the Backboard
- Colorblind; The Katrina Monologues
- Men Who Hug in Bars
- Hands in the Dark
- The Flying Girls
- Fungie and the Quiet Men
