= El Arco =

El Arco may refer to:

- El Arco, Salamanca, a village and municipality in the province of Salamanca, Spain
- Arch of Cabo San Lucas, a distinctive rock formation at Cabo San Lucas, Baja California, Mexico
