= Paul Marcinkus =

Catholic archbishop, former head of the Vatican Bank (1922–2006)

The Most Reverend Paul Marcinkus GCIH
- Pro-President Emeritus of the Pontifical Commission for the Vatican City State
- Church: Roman Catholic Church
- Appointed: September 26, 1981
- Term ended: October 30, 1990
- Predecessor: Sergio Guerri
- Successor: None; position abolished
- Previous posts: President, Institute for Works of Religion (1971–1989); Secretary, Administrative Section, Institute for Works of Religion (1969–1971); Titular Archbishop of Horta (1969–2006)

Orders
- Ordination: May 3, 1947 by Samuel Alphonsus Stritch
- Consecration: January 6, 1969 by Pope Paul VI

Personal details
- Born: Paul Casimir Marcinkus; January 15, 1922 Cicero, Illinois, United States
- Died: February 20, 2006 (aged 84) Sun City, Arizona, United States
- Education: Archbishop Quigley Preparatory Seminary; University of Saint Mary of the Lake; Pontifical Gregorian University; Pontifical Ecclesiastical Academy
- Motto: Servite Dominum cum Laetitia

Paul Casimir Marcinkus GCIH (/mɑːrˈsɪŋkəs/; January 15, 1922 – February 20, 2006) was an American Catholic prelate who served as president of the Institute for the Works of Religion, commonly known as the Vatican Bank, from 1971 to 1989. He also served as president of the Governorate for Vatican City State from 1989 to 1990, following eight years as vice-president. He was the titular Archbishop of Horta.

== Early life ==
Marcinkus was born in Cicero, Illinois, the son of Lithuanian immigrants and the youngest of five children. His father worked as a window cleaner, among other occupations.

After attending Archbishop Quigley Preparatory Seminary and St. Mary of the Lake Seminary, Marcinkus was ordained to the priesthood for the Archdiocese of Chicago on May 3, 1947, and served parish assignments with both St. Christina's and Holy Cross Church on the city's south side. By 1949, he had been appointed to the archdiocese's matrimonial tribunal, which processed petitions to recognize the nullity of putatively valid marriages.

== International career ==
In 1950, Marcinkus began to fulfil special assignments for the Holy See and became friendly with Cardinal Giovanni Battista Montini, later Pope Paul VI, while studying canon law at the Gregorian University. Upon earning his degree in 1953, he completed the two-year program for prospective diplomats at the Pontifical Ecclesiastical Academy and was assigned to Bolivia in 1955 and to Canada four years later, serving as secretary in the nunciature of the Holy See in both instances.

Beginning in December 1959, he worked at the Secretariat of State in Rome and served on occasion as an interpreter for Pope John XXIII and as an English translator for Pope Paul VI. Under Paul VI, he helped manage arrangements for papal overseas trips. His height and muscular build served him well as an "informal bodyguard" for Paul VI, earning him the nickname "The Papón". On January 6, 1969, he received his episcopal consecration as titular Bishop of Horta.

=== Vatican Bank and Vatican City State ===
Pope Paul VI appointed Marcinkus secretary of the Vatican Bank in 1968. He was named its president in 1971 at the age of 48, serving in that role until 1989. Although an able administrator, Marcinkus had no prior experience as a banker. Upon his initial appointment to the Vatican Bank, he underwent brief training and short (of days-to-weeks) observational periods at several financial institutions.

As early as April 24, 1973, Marcinkus was questioned in his Vatican office by United States federal prosecutor William Aronwald and Bill Lynch, head of the Organized Crime and Racketeering Section of the United States Department of Justice, about his involvement in the delivery of $14.5 million worth of counterfeit bonds to the Vatican in July 1971, part of a total request of $950 million stated in a letter on Vatican letterhead. His name had arisen and the letter come to light during the investigation of an international gangster, who eventually served 12 years in prison. Marcinkus said "he considered the charges against him serious, but not based enough on fact that he would violate the Vatican Bank's confidentiality to defend himself...back in the States, it was agreed on the highest levels that the case against Marcinkus could not be pursued any further."

In 1979, Marcinkus was reported as having been targeted by the Red Brigades, a far-left terrorist group, for possible kidnap or assassination after his address and other documents were found in the apartment of two group members, Valerio Morucci and Adriana Faranda.

In 1981, Pope John Paul II promoted Marcinkus to archbishop and, in addition to his role with the Vatican Bank, made him vice-president of the Governorate of Vatican City State, in effect its governor.

In 1982, he allegedly thwarted an assassination attempt against Pope John Paul II in Fátima, Portugal, when Juan Maria Fernandez y Krohn, a reportedly disturbed priest, attacked the Pope with a bayonet. In fact, several Portuguese police officers grabbed and disarmed the attacker, preventing the Pope from being stabbed.

In July 1982, Marcinkus was implicated in financial scandals being reported on the front pages of newspapers and magazines throughout Europe, particularly the collapse of the Banco Ambrosiano, in which Propaganda Due (aka "P2"), a Masonic Lodge, was involved. Marcinkus had been a director of Ambrosiano Overseas, based in Nassau, Bahamas, and had been involved with Ambrosiano's chairman, financier Roberto Calvi, for a number of years.

The scandal widened after the body of Roberto Calvi, whose Banco Ambrosiano had dealt with Marcinkus, was found hanging under London's Blackfriars Bridge in June 1982. Marcinkus himself was never charged with a crime.

Marcinkus stepped aside as head of the Vatican Bank in June 1989, with a board of laymen assuming control of the bank. He was then made president of the Governorate of Vatican City State.

The Vatican eventually paid £145 million in a settlement with creditors, with Marcinkus observing in 1986 that "You can't run the Church on Hail Marys." Marcinkus later said that he was misquoted, what he actually said was: "When my workers come to retire, they expect a pension; it's no use my saying to them 'I'll pay you 400 Hail Marys."

Marcinkus resigned from Vatican service on October 30, 1990.

== Allegations ==
In 1984, Marcinkus was named by David Yallop as a possible accomplice in the claimed "murder" of Pope John Paul I; Yallop made allegations regarding a number of suspects, involving the Mafia and Freemasonry. For instance, Anthony Raimondi, who purports to be a nephew of Lucky Luciano, claimed in 2019 that he helped his alleged cousin Marcinkus murder the pope. Loris Serafini, director of a museum in Canale d'Agordo overseeing a collection covering John Paul I's life, refers to the purported murder as "an unshakable myth", and Chico Harlan and Stefano Pitrelli, writing for the Washington Post, report that: "One papal doctor believed heart attack was the likeliest cause of death. Another doctor who'd previously treated the pope said there was "no clinical doubt" that the cause was circulatory... In her official work as postulator, Stefania Falasca, a journalist for the Italian newspaper Avvenire, and the lead investigator for the Vatican regarding the late pope's canonisation, quotes the conflicting medical opinions and does not try to weigh which was likelier.

As of 2008, a case of a missing person had been reopened after claims that Emanuela Orlandi, daughter of a Vatican employee, had been kidnapped and later killed on orders of Marcinkus were made by Sabrina Minardi, a former girlfriend of Enrico De Pedis, boss of the gang, Banda della Magliana. Investigators remained cautious but were reportedly impressed by the accuracy of some details, as reported by La Repubblica.

== Later life and death ==
Marcinkus's grave at Saint Casimir Catholic Cemetery

Marcinkus returned to the Archdiocese of Chicago in 1990 before retiring to Arizona, where he lived as an assistant parish priest at St. Clement of Rome Church in Sun City, Arizona. He declined to discuss his role in the Ambrosiano scandal.

Marcinkus died in Sun City, aged 84, of undisclosed causes. He was buried at Saint Casimir Catholic Cemetery in Chicago.

== In popular culture ==
Marcinkus was played by actor Rutger Hauer in the Italian film The Bankers of God.

In Francis Ford Coppola's The Godfather Part III, actor Donal Donnelly portrayed Archbishop Gilday. The character is widely perceived as based on Marcinkus.

In 2006, Marcinkus was played by actor Jacques Sernas in the 2006 Italian TV Series Pope John Paul I: The Smile of God.

Tom Flannery's one-man play Marcinkus (2006) played in Wilkes-Barre and Scranton, Pennsylvania to positive reviews.

Marcinkus was portrayed by actor Randall Paul in Roberto Faenza's 2016 film La Verità Sta in Cielo ('The Truth Lies in Heaven').

== Honours ==
Grand Cross of the Order of Prince Henry, Portugal (2 September 1983)

== See also ==
- Propaganda Due
- Banco Ambrosiano
- Emanuela Orlandi
