= Swinthin Maxwell Arko =

Ghanaian politician

Swithin Maxwell Arko

Member of the Ghana Parliament for Agona Nsaba
- In office 1965–1966
- Preceded by: New
- Succeeded by: Constituency abolished

Personal details
- Born: Swithin Maxwell Yaw Arko; 21 March 1920 Nsaba, Central Region, Gold Coast
- Died: 2006 (aged 85–86)
- Party: Convention People's Party
- Education: Mfantsipim School
- Profession: Educationist

Swithin Maxwell Arko (1920–2006) was a Ghanaian politician in the first republic. He was the member of parliament for the Agona Nsaba constituency from 1965 to 1966. Prior to entering parliament he was the chairman of the Agona Local Council and later chairman of the National Association of Local Government Councils.

== Early life and education ==
Arko was born on 21 March 1920 at Nsaba, a town in the Central Region of Ghana. He was educated at the Nsaba Presbyterian Middle Boarding School and Mfantsipim School, Cape Coast. He proceeded to the United Kingdom to study Local Government Administration after working with U. A. G. Ltd for about ten years.

== Career and politics ==
Arko begun working with U. A. G. Ltd from 1941 until 1951 when he left for the United Kingdom for further studies. Upon his return to Ghana in 1952, he served on the Agona Local Council as clerk of the council. In 1957 he joined the Cocoa Marketing Board as a senior loans officer. He worked with the Cocoa Marketing Board until 1962 when he became chairman of the Agona Local Council and vice chairman of the National Association of the Local Government Council. He later became chairman of the National Association of the Local Government Council. He was also an executive member of the African Union of Local Authorities and an executive member of the International Union of Local Authorities. In June 1965 he became the member of parliament for the Agona Nsaba constituency. He served in that capacity until February 1966 when the Nkrumah government was overthrown.

== Personal life ==
Arko died in 2006 and was survived by seven children. His hobbies included reading and football.

== See also ==
- List of MPs elected in the 1965 Ghanaian parliamentary election
