= Dexia =

Franco-Belgian financial institution

Dexia N.V./S.A.

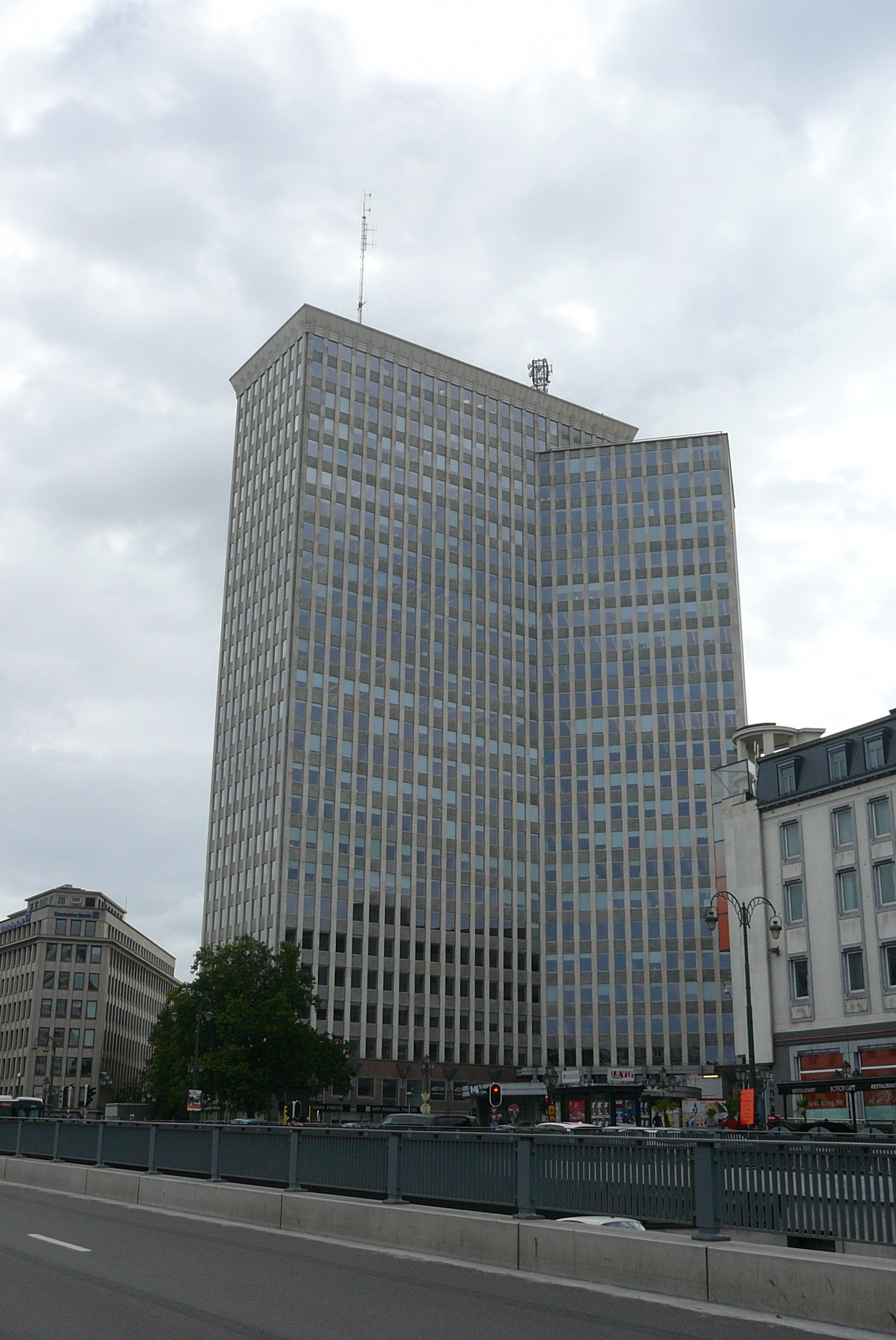
- Tour Bastion in Brussels, head office of Dexia since 2012
- Company type: State-owned enterprise
- Traded as: Euronext Brussels: DEXB Paris Bourse: DEX (until 2000)
- Industry: Financial services
- Founded: 1996; 30 years ago
- Headquarters: Ixelles, Brussels, Belgium; La Défense, Greater Paris, France
- Area served: Worldwide
- Key people: Robert de Metz (chairman, board of directors); Karel De Boeck (Managing Director, president of Executive Committee)
- Products: Public sector banking, commercial banking, private banking, insurance
- Net income: ▼€ -462 million (2017)
- Total assets: ▼€180,938 million (end 2017)
- Total equity: ▲€4,992 million (end 2017)
- Owner: Belgian Federal State (52.78%); French State (46.81%); others (0.41%)
- Number of employees: 22461 (2011)
- Subsidiaries: Crediop (70%)
- Capital ratio: ▲19.5% (CET1, end 2017)
- Website: www.dexia.com
- Footnotes / references in consolidated financial statement

Dexia N.V./S.A., or the Dexia Group, is a Franco-Belgian financial institution formed in 1996. At its peak in 2010, it had about 35,200 members of staff and a core shareholders' equity of €19.2 billion.

In 2008, the bank entered severe financial difficulties and received taxpayer bailouts for €6 billion, and it became the first big casualty of the 2011 European sovereign debt crisis. Due to big losses, suffered among others from the debt haircut on Greek government bonds, its Common Equity Tier 1 (CET1) capital ratio became negative during the second half of 2011, and an orderly resolution process began in October 2011.

As part of the resolution, Dexia Bank Belgium was bought out from the Dexia group by the Belgian state and has continued to operate, since March 2012 under the new name Belfius. The French bank focused on local government lending was restructured as SFIL. The remaining part of the Dexia group was left in a "bad bank", still called Dexia, to be gradually wound down.

== Profile ==
In the 2010 Fortune Global 500 (which lists companies by total income) Dexia was ranked 49th, the top-ranked Belgian company.

The company was founded in 1996 through the merger of Crédit Communal de Belgique (founded in 1860) and Crédit Local de France (founded in 1987). The Dexia Group was founded as a dual-listed company, but in 1999 the Belgian entity took over the French entity to form one company. The company is headquartered in Brussels, Belgium. France and Belgium just injected another combined €5.5 billion ($7 billion) into Dexia.

== History ==
=== Belgium: Gemeentekrediet van België / Crédit Communal de Belgique ===
- 1860 – Foundation of the Gemeentekrediet van België / Crédit Communal de Belgique, specifically aimed at financing the investments of the local administrations. The communities were shareholders, for a value of at least 5% of the amounts drawn.
- 1947 – Development of a network of retail branches that allow drawing funds from the general public through savings accounts. From 1960 on the branches were run by independent agents, allowing a broader range of services and products to be offered and a lasting relationship with clients to be developed.
- 1990 – Start of the international expansion of the bank with the creation of the Cregem International Bank in the Grand Duchy of Luxembourg, specialising in the management of large sums of money.
- 1991 – The Gemeentekrediet builds on its international expansion by taking a stake of 25% in the Banque Internationale à Luxembourg (BIL), the biggest bank in Luxembourg. In early 1992 the firm increased its stake in BIL to 51%.

=== France: Crédit Local de France ===
- 1987 – Foundation of the Crédit Local de France as a successor to the CAECL (Caisse d'aide à l'équipement des collectivités locales); it was a public administrative institution, managed by the Caisse des dépôts. The Crédit Local de France was a specialised financial institution responding to the needs of local administrations, that have become important economic agents in their own, and make as much use of products and services of the financial markets as businesses.
- 1990 – The Crédit Local de France begins an international expansion with the opening of an American subsidiary, the CLF New York Agency. Aiming at a similar development in Europe, the CLF mainly operated in Great Britain, Spain, Germany and Italy; additional activities were later added in Austria, Scandinavia, and Portugal.
- 1991 – Crédit Local de France underwent an initial public offering on the Paris Stock Exchange. The shareholders at the time were the French State (25.5%), the Caisse des dépôts (25%), and individual investors from France and abroad (49.5%).

=== Dexia: the group ===
- 1996: Merger of the Gemeentekrediet / Credit Communal de Belgium and the Crédit Local de France to form Dexia.
- 1997: Dexia takes a stake of 40% in the Italian firm Crediop, the biggest privately owned bank specialising in finance for Italian local administrations.
- 1998: Dexia increases its shareholding in Crediop to 60%.
- 1999: First listing of Dexia Group as a dual-listed company on the Brussels and Paris stock exchanges in November, at a price of €6.86 per share. In Belgium the stock became part of the BEL20 index, and in France of the CAC 40. The group broadens its insurance activities in France, Belgium and Germany. Dexia S.A. the Belgium side soon became the parent company of French side Dexia Credit Local.
- 2000: Acquisition of Financial Security Assurance (FSA) in the United States, a major player in credit enhancement for municipalities, making Dexia the world leader in the market of financial services to the public sector. Dexia is active in nearly all European countries in this market as well. Start of an annual reserved capital injection to which only Dexia members of staff can inscribe.
- 2001: Acquisition of Artesia Banking Corporation, a banking group with activities as retail bank (BACOB), insurance (DVV) and asset management (Cordius). The stake in Crediop grows to 70%, and Dexia gains control over Otzar Hashilton Hamekomi, an Israeli credit provider for local authorities.
- 2002: Integration of the Artesia branches in Belgium.
- 2006: Acquisition of 99.8% of the Turkish firm DenizBank.
- 2006: Royal Bank of Canada created Institutional Investment Joint Venture with Dexia. It is a 50/50 Partnership called RBC Dexia Investor Services.

=== Crisis 2008/2009 ===
On 29 September 2008, Dexia came under pressure due to the 2008 financial crisis. Other banks and financial institutions refused to provide further credit to Dexia because of potential losses at its U.S. subsidiary FSA and from a multi-billion loan to troubled German bank Depfa. The price of the Dexia share, having peaked above €20 in the previous years, but gradually fallen to around €10, dropped in one day to €6.62.

The next day the rating agency Moody's downgraded Dexia's long term debt and deposits ratings from Aa1 to Aa3, and downgraded the individual banks' strengths to C− ("adequate intrinsic financial strength") with a negative outlook.

Dexia was quickly forced to apply for a taxpayer bailout. This support was assured within days, taking two forms:

- a capital injection of €6.4 billion, consisting of €3 billion from the Belgian State and regional governments, €3 billion from the French State and Caisse des Dépôts et Consignations and €376 million from the government of Luxembourg.
- a state guarantee (effective from 31 October 2008) covering Dexia's liabilities towards credit institutions and institutional counterparties, as well as bonds and other debt securities issued for the same counterparties, for a total maximum amount of €150 billion. Belgium provided 60.5% of the guarantee, with a 36.5% contribution from the French state and 3% from Luxembourg.

The three states have the potential to make a profit from their intervention:

- the new capital buys Dexia shares at a price of €9.90 per asset
- for the state guarantee Dexia has to pay a monthly fee, from which the three states benefit proportionally to their share in the guarantee. The guaranteed amount varies continually as a function of Dexia's loans on the financial markets. It peaked mid-2009 at around €100 billion, but after Dexia managed to start selling non-guaranteed commercial paper and bonds again, fell to half this size by the end of 2009. In 2009 Dexia paid a fee of 0.5% on the guaranteed credits with a term of less than one year, and 0.865% on the credits longer than one year. The guarantee is currently planned to end in November 2010.

Since Dexia had a New York banking office they were eligible for various bailouts from the US Federal Reserve. At its peak Dexia had borrowed $58.5 billion.

On 30 September 2008 the company's chairman Pierre Richard and CEO Axel Miller were dismissed, and were replaced on 7 October 2008 by former Belgian prime minister Jean-Luc Dehaene and Pierre Mariani respectively. On 24 October 2008, Francois Rebsamen, the socialist Mayor of Dijon and a French Senator, vacated his place on the board of Dexia Credit Local, while Antoine Rufenacht, UMP mayor of Le Havre, Philippe Duron, socialist mayor of Caen, and Christophe Bechu, president of Maine-et-Loire province stayed.

At the end of 2008 Dexia sold the healthy parts of FSA, ceased its trading activities in Paris and trading on its own account in the financial markets.

Further losses are still possible on the remaining FSA portfolio. On 19 January 2009 Moody's lowered the credit rating for Dexia's long term obligations and saving accounts of the three banking parts of Dexia (Dexia Credit Local in France, Dexia Bank Belgium and Dexia Banque Internationale in Luxembourg) from Aa3 to A1. The rating agency also downgraded the Bank Financial Strength Rating for the three banks from C− to D+.

On 5 March 2009 Dexia's share price fell to an all-time low of €1.21, a loss of over 90% in a year. A further restructuring plan was announced, with the firm aiming to concentrate on its primary activities, and to avoid risks on the financial markets. A total of 1,500 job cuts were announced, of which more than half were in Belgium, 260 in France, and the rest worldwide. Dexia's share price subsequently increased over the rest of 2009, largely varying between €4 and €7.50.

On 31 March 2010 Bloomberg reported that Dexia was one of the largest borrowers from the discount window of the United States Federal Reserve, having outstanding loans of over $30 billion.

=== Losses ===
In February 2009 the bank announced net losses of 3.3 billion euros (approximately 4.2 billion US dollars) for 2008. The Dexia 2008 annual report mentions among others losses of €1.6 billion from selling FSA, €600 million on portfolios and €800 million on counterparties (including Lehman Brothers, Icelandic banks, and Washington Mutual)

According to the financial services provider Bloomberg Dexia lost €78 million through the Ponzi scheme of Bernard Madoff.

=== 2010: Downsizing and reorganizing ===
On 6 February 2010 Dexia could announce that the European Commission had, under certain conditions, approved of the restructuring plan that was necessary to justify the government support for Dexia and to prevent unfair competition:

- some acquisitions had to be undone (Dexia Crediop, Dexia Sabadell and Dexia Banka Slovensko) but banking activities in Turkey, highly promising to Dexia, could continue.
- by the middle of 2011 the State Guarantee had to be abandoned
- in total Dexia had to downsize by one third by 2014.

Vintage retail activities represented a bigger share in profits again in 2010; apart from Belgium and France, Turkey became very promising in this area. So much so that predictions were that Turkish staff would account for half of the Dexia employees by 2014. At the same time, outgoing cashflows were diminished by reducing the bonds portfolio; even selling bonds at a loss, if necessary, which explained to a large extent the lesser profits in 2010.

More incoming funds from private saving accounts and less outgoing capital through bonds and loans to public institutions meant that Dexia could already worry a bit less about finding sufficient short term funding. The greater international trust in the company also showed when it announced an early retirement from the State Guarantee in 2010.

=== 2011 ===
Dexia and La Banque postale, the bank subsidiary of the French postal services, reached an agreement in January 2011 about a cash transaction involving covered bonds worth €3 billion. This was presented for La Banque Postale as an investment at market conditions, and as an extra source of liquidity for Dexia.

Alleged differences of opinion were reported at the top of Dexia. More specifically about tensions between Belgian directors and the French CEO, Pierre Mariani, concerning on the one hand the deficitary investments that had been mostly done in the French division of Dexia, and the liquid funds that were above all present in Belgium.

On 15 July the European Banking Authority, as part of its European bank stress tests, gave Dexia a clean bill of health, reporting that its tier 1 capital was 12.1 percent, and would fall to 10.4 percent in 2012 under its "adverse scenario". This would make it one of Europe's safest banks.

Dexia posted a €4 billion loss for the second quarter, the biggest in its history, after writing down the value of its Greek debt. On 4 October its shares fell 22% to €1.01 in Brussels, cutting its market value to €1.96 billion. Discussions were taking place about a possible breakup, with a plan to place its "legacy" division into a bad bank with government guarantees.

On 10 October, it was announced that the Belgian banking arm will be purchased for €4 billion by the Belgian federal government. Some units such as DenizBank and the Luxembourg retail bank will be put up for sale. Part of its French operations are likely to be purchased by Caisse des dépôts et consignations and La Banque Postale. The remaining troubled assets, including a €95 billion bond portfolio would remain in a "bad bank" that would receive funding guarantees of up to €90 billion provided by the governments of Belgium (60.5%), France (36.5%) and Luxembourg (3%).

=== 2012 ===
On 27 July, Dexia confirms the sale of its 50% share in RBC Dexia Investor Services. The business moves under the sole ownership of Royal Bank of Canada (RBC) and is renamed RBC Investor Services.

In the same year Banque Internationale à Luxembourg (for €730 million) and DenizBank were sold.

=== 2013 ===
In January 2013 Dexia Municipal Agency was sold. It was reported in September 2013 that Dexia had entered into talks with New York Life Investment Management to sell Dexia Asset Management, which was completed on 3 February 2014. In 2013 SFIL was sold.

=== 2014 ===
ECB officials agreed on Thursday 22 May 2014 that Franco-Belgian bank Dexia would not have to demonstrate it could bear a financial crisis in a Europe-wide stress test, reducing the chances of it needing further state aid. The ECB had already acknowledged Dexia's "specific situation", with an assessment of its finances carried out over its 2011 wind-down plan. That EU-approved plans makes Dexia unique among the 128 major euro zone banks being reviewed by the European Central Bank (ECB) and the 124 EU banks that are being subjected to stress tests by the European Banking Authority (EBA). The Comprehensive Assessment completed in October 2014 ahead of the entry into force of European Banking Supervision suggested Dexia had a capital shortfall of €340 million. However, as the bank was guarantee by States, the bank was not required to capital increases.

A subsidiary, Dexia Asset Management changed its name to Candriam following its acquisition by New York Life Investments on 3 February 2014.

=== 2015 ===
In 2015 Dexia announced that it would suffer from the possible default of Heta Asset Resolution, a bad bank from the residual of Hypo Alpe-Adria-Bank International. Via the subsidiary Dexia Kommunalbank Deutschland A.G. (DKD), Dexia had a loan of €417 million to former Hypo Bank. Carinthia state government offered to buy back the senior bonds for 75% par value and 30% for subordinated bonds of Heta. Previously Carinthia had guaranteed the subordinated bond but later Austrian central government, as instructed by European Union, could not provide any more state aid. Moreover, Financial Market Authority of Austria used the power given by EU Bank Recovery and Resolution Directive, which bail-in the shareholders and subordinated bond holders.

On the subsidiaries, Crediop would be run-off, Dexia Credito Local Mexico had been placed in a trust, Dexia Kommunalkredit Bulgaria was liquidated, Dexia Nederland and Dexia Luxembourg (ex-Dexia LdG Banque) abandoned their banking licenses.

=== 2018 ===
Dexia sells its 58.9% interest in Dexia Israel Bank in March 2018. In December 2018, German subsidiary Dexia Kommunalbank Deutschland (DKD) was sold to Helaba for €352 million.

== Figures ==
=== Dexia shares ===
Dexia was a member of the BEL20 and CAC Next 20 indices. Dexia is also one of the components of the Euro STOXX and Euro STOXX Banks indices.

Year	Share value in euros on 31 Dec.
2001	15.80
2002	11.90
2003	13.70
2004	16.90
2005	19.50
2006	20.80
2007	17.00
2008	3.20
2009	4.50
2010	2.60
2011	0.30
2012	0.07
2013	0.04

=== Results ===
Year	Revenue	Net income/(loss)
2005	€5,976 million	€2,038 million
2006	€7,012 million	€2,750 million
2007	€6,896 million	€2,533 million
2008	€3,556 million	(€3,326 million)
2009	€6,163 million	€1,010 million
2010	€5,310 million	€723 million

=== Shareholder structure ===
Shareholders	% 2009	% 2010
Institutional and private shareholders	26.7	28.2
Caisse des dépôts et consignations	17.6	17.6
Communal Holding	14.1	14.1
ARCO Group	13.9	13.8
French State	5.7	5.7
Belgian Federal State	5.7	5.7
Three Belgian Regions	5.7	5.7
Ethias	5.0	5.0
CNP Assurances	3.0	3.0
Dexia employees	2.6	1.1

== BIC ==
Dexia's BIC codes are:

- For Dexia Credit Local: CLFR FR CC

== Controversies ==
=== Netherlands ===
Dexia had ambitious plans in the Netherlands, and took over Bank Labouchère from the Dutch insurer Aegon in August 2000 at the height of the market. On top of this, in 2001 the business bank Kempen & Co was bought and removed from the stock market for about €1 billion. The two acquired companies Labouchère and Kempen & Co were merged into Dexia Netherlands. This merger had to be undone however, because of an asset leasing affair that threatened to damage the reputation of Kempen & Co.

The asset leasing affair left Dexia in The Netherlands in the end with so much negative publicity that it decided to reduce its Dutch activities. In 2004 Kempen & Co was sold for about €85 million, a fraction of the buying price, to its management, the Friesland Bank, NPM Capital and HAL Investments.

Dexia Bank Netherlands still continues to unwind asset leasing contracts under the commercial name of Legio Lease, and the corresponding agreements and court cases. Dexia suffered a substantial loss in March 2008, after a ruling from the Supreme Court on the legality of leasing contracts, in which contracts were considered invalid for married couples of which both partners had not signed the contract. Dexia as a consequence had to repay these debts plus accrued interests. Luckily for Dexia many customers had previously agreed to a less favourable Duisenberg-agreement and could not revoke this. Eventually only 3,000 of the hundreds of thousands of Legiolease customers profited from this ruling of the High Council.

=== Sustainability ===
According to research of Netwerk Vlaanderen Dexia in 2005 together with AXA, Fortis, ING and KBC invested over €6.6 billion in companies that were involved in human rights violations. The companies and projects in which banks invest are controversial because of their support for dictatorial regimes, forced displacements and forced labour. The criticism concerns among others investments in a gas pipe line in Myanmar and the BTC pipe line through Turkey, Azerbaijan and Georgia. In 2005 Dexia announced a new policy concerning the weapons industry. Companies involved in the production of anti-personnel mines will be completely barred from banking services. For investment funds there is no limitation of investments in the weapons industry.

Dexia did on the other hand rank 17th in 2011 on the list of 'The Global 100 Most Sustainable Corporations in the World'. Dexia was the third company from the financial sector on the list.

=== Israeli settlements controversy ===
Through its Israeli subsidiary, Dexia operates in certain Israeli settlements in the Occupied Palestinian Territories. Several Belgian and French NGOs mounted campaigns to attract attention to this. Leading ultimately in 2011 to concrete plans to sell the Israeli division, Dexia Israel Bank.

=== Remunerations ===
==== Axel Miller ====
After his forced departure in October 2008, CEO Axel Miller was contractually entitled to a 'golden parachute' of €3.7 million. This provoked protest from the French president Nicolas Sarkozy, and Miller subsequently renounced his bonus, leaving the matter to "the wisdom of the Board of Directors". The board eventually decided to pay him one year's salary (€825,000), thus ignoring Sarkozy's remarks.

The French Ministry of Finance stated in April 2009 that it had voted against the payout, but that its representatives on the board were outnumbered.

==== Salary of Pierre Mariani ====
Axel Miller's successor, Pierre Mariani, close to Nicolas Sarkozy, obtained a salary that is 30% higher than that of Miller.

The board of directors unanimously accepted on 13 November 2008 to upgrade the yearly salary of the CEO to €1 million, and to fix the maximum bonus at €2.25 million. Miller's salary was €825,000, with a maximum bonus of €1.8 million.

==== Bonuses in 2008 ====
Within Dexia Crédit Local, the French component of Dexia group, a pool of €8 million was dedicated to the bonuses of the leading managers, mainly directors. The management indicated that the sum would be shared among 400 to 765 employees.

==== "Golden hellos" ====
Philippe Rucheton, the financial director appointed by Dexia in April 2009, coming from Société Générale, received a welcome bonus of €500,000.

==== Bonus 2010 ====
In 2010 Dexia announced its plan to provide CEO Pierre Mariani with a bonus of €600,000. For Jean-Luc Dehaene a remuneration was planned of €88,000. The allotment of high bonuses at Dexia and competitor KBC caused some commotion in Belgium. Leading the city of Ghent to remove some €30 million in short term investments from Dexia and KBC.

== Buildings ==
=== Dexia Tower ===
The Dexia Tower, the firm's new head office in Brussels, is with its height of 137m an icon in the business district of Brussels-North. In December 2006 the tower was equipped with LED lighting. A total of 126,000 programmable LED strips have been fitted. From 22 December 2006 to 15 January 2007, the colours of the tower could be chosen by the public from a touchscreen. It was spin-off and occupied by Belfius (ex-Dexia Bank Belgium).

=== Tour Dexia ===
The Tour Dexia at La Défense, previously known as the CBX tower, is the bank's Parisian headquarter since 2007.

== See also ==
- List of investors in Bernard L. Madoff Securities
- Panama Papers
- Rogier Tower
- List of banks in France
