= Ettore Gotti Tedeschi =

Italian banker and economist

- Born: 3 March 1945 (age 81); Pontenure

Academic background
- Influences: Economic liberalism

Academic work
- Discipline: Economics
- Institutions: Institute for Works of Religion (the Vatican Bank)

Ettore Gotti Tedeschi (born 3 March 1945 in Pontenure) is an Italian economist and banker, and ex-President of the Institute for Works of Religion, also known as the Vatican Bank (from 2009 to 2012).

In 2017, he signed a document along with a number of other clergy and academics labeled as a "Filial Correction" of Pope Francis.

== Biography ==
Tedeschi worked as an industrial and financial strategy consultant with the French IT company Sema-Metra from 1973 to 1984. In 1985 he began to work on finance for the financier Procomin Imi-BNL, and then switched to Sogei. He worked on the IPO of Parmalat, an Italian dairy and food corporation, which led him to be involved in the negotiations for the acquisition of Federconsorzi in 1991. Meanwhile, Tedeschi entered the Board of Directors of the Parmalat group.

In 1992 with Gianmario Roveraro as financier, Tedeschi helped to found the Akros Finanziaria at the request of Emilio Botín, closely associated with the Spanish Santander Group. The Akros Group collected approximately 275 billion euros from 200 shareholders (including Fiat, Iri, Cir, Ferrero, Parmalat, Commercial Union, Banca Popolare di Milano and the Torinia Savings Bank), and in 1993 he was nominated for Italy's President of the Finconsumo Banca SpA (later Santander Consumer Bank SpA), to be guide and chairman to the Italian operations of the Spanish bank.

From 1996 to 2006 he was Professor of Financial Strategy to the Università Cattolica del Sacro Cuore, then to Business Ethics' University of Turin. As of current he teaches ethics at the Università Cattolica del Sacro Cuore, and he is writer for L'Osservatore Romano, and Il Sole 24 Ore. He also holds many positions in various banking institutions, funds of Venture Capital, and Private Equity.

=== Head of the Institute for Works of Religion ===
Tedeschi became president of the Institute for Works of Religion in 2009. This was two years after Paolo Cipriani had become the director of the bank, and it was initially believed that Gotti Tedeschi would continue the reforms brought about by Cipriani. These included making sure that only approved accounts existed and that transactions were adequately tracked.

Tedeschi was investigated due to a money laundering scandal in 2010 but no charges were brought against him.

In May 2012, Tedeschi was forced from his position at the Institute for Works of Religion, due to a no-confidence vote by the board of directors and was temporarily succeeded by the German, Ronaldo Hermann Schmitz. The Vatican stated that Tedeschi was removed "because he failed to fulfill the primary functions of his office". On the one hand, Tedeschi stated his removal was because he wanted transparency and other people connected with the bank opposed this, but he also confirmed to prosecutors that he came to the office only two days a week, spending the vast majority of his time as the head of Spain's Banco Santander office in Milan. The vice-president of the board, Ronaldo Schmitz, a former executive director of Deutsche Bank, wrote to the secretary of state to say that he would resign if the then president were not removed.

Tedeschi stated that he was targeted specifically because he was seeking information on the non-religious accounts at the bank.

=== Raid ===
In a separate case, on 5 June 2012, Tedeschi's home in Piacenza Italy was raided along his two work offices in Milan. This was as part of a corruption probe into Giuseppe Orsi of defense contractor Finmeccanica, related to the sale of twelve helicopters to India, in which Tedeschi was considered an informed witness.
