= Institute for the Works of Religion =

Financial institution in Vatican City

Coordinates: 41°54′14″N 12°27′24″E

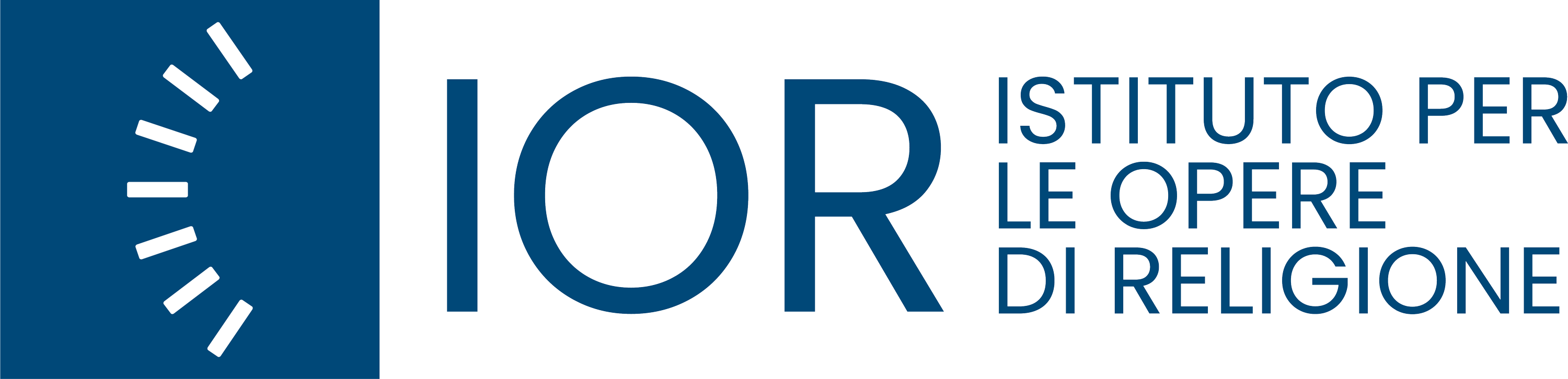

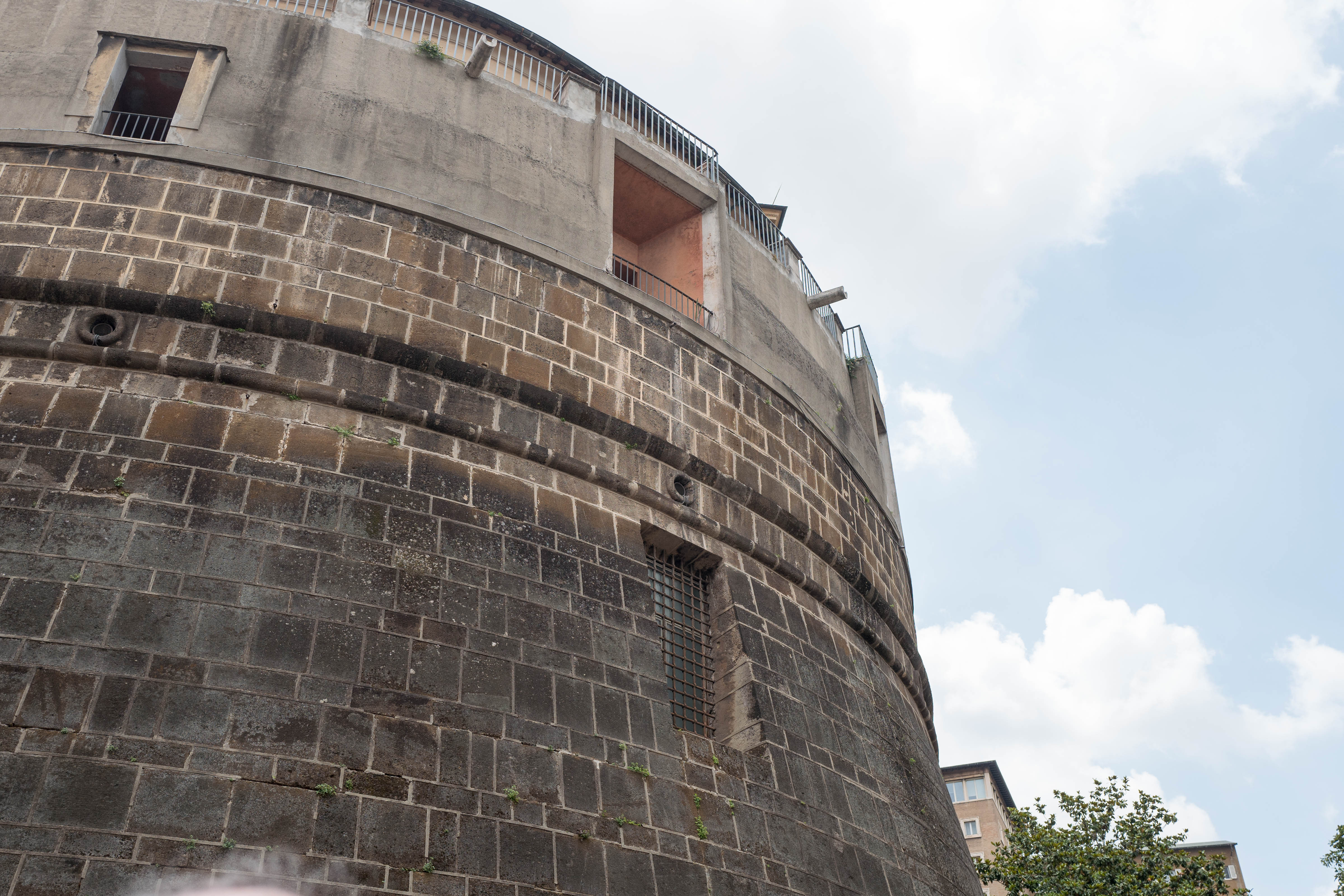
- Torrione di Niccolò V in the Apostolic Palace, seat of the IOR
- Native name: Istituto per le Opere di Religione
- Type: Juridical canonical foundation
- Industry: Financial services
- Founded: 27 June 1942 (absorption of the Administration of the Works of Religion)
- Founder: Pope Pius XII
- Headquarters: Vatican City
- Key people: François Pauly (President); Giovanni Boscia (General Director)
- Net income: €32.8 million (2024)
- AUM: €3.18 billion (2024)
- Total assets: €5.7 billion (2024)
- Total equity: €731 million (2024)
- Number of employees: 105 (2024)
- Rating: Tier1 Ratio 69.4%
- Website: ior.va

The Institute for the Works of Religion (Italian: Istituto per le Opere di Religione; Latin: Institutum pro Operibus Religionis; abbreviated IOR), commonly known as the Vatican Bank, is a financial institution that is situated inside Vatican City and run by a Board of Superintendence, which reports to a Commission of Cardinals and the Pope. It is not a private bank, as there are no owners or shareholders; it has been established in the form of a juridical canonical foundation, pursuant to its statutes. The IOR is regulated by the Vatican's financial supervisory authority, the Autorità di Supervisione e Informazione Finanziaria (ASIF).

The Institute was founded in June 1942 by papal decree of Pope Pius XII. In June 2012, the IOR gave the first presentation of its operations. In July 2013, the Institute launched its own website. On 1 October 2013, it also published its first-ever annual report.

On 24 June 2013, Pope Francis created a special investigative Pontifical Commission (CRIOR) to study IOR reform. On 7 April 2014, Pope Francis approved recommendations on the IOR's future which were jointly developed by the CRIOR and COSEA commissions and the IOR's management. "The IOR will continue to serve with prudence and provide specialized financial services to the Catholic Church worldwide", as the Vatican release stated. On 7 April 2014, Pope Francis approved a proposal on the Institute's future, "reaffirming the importance of the IOR's mission for the good of the Catholic Church, the Holy See and the Vatican City State". On 30 January 2023, with a Chirograph published on March 7, Pope Francis revised the Statute, reaffirming that the purpose of the Institute is "to provide for the custody and management of movable and immovable assets transferred or entrusted to it by individuals or legal entities, intended for works of religion or charity."

On 23 August 2022 Pope Francis signed a Rescript establishing that all financial resources of the Holy See and its associated institutions must be transferred to the Institute for the Works of Religion, which is to be considered the sole and exclusive entity responsible for asset management activities and the custodian of the Holy See's movable assets, as well as those of its departments, offices, and affiliated entities.

== Origin and mission ==
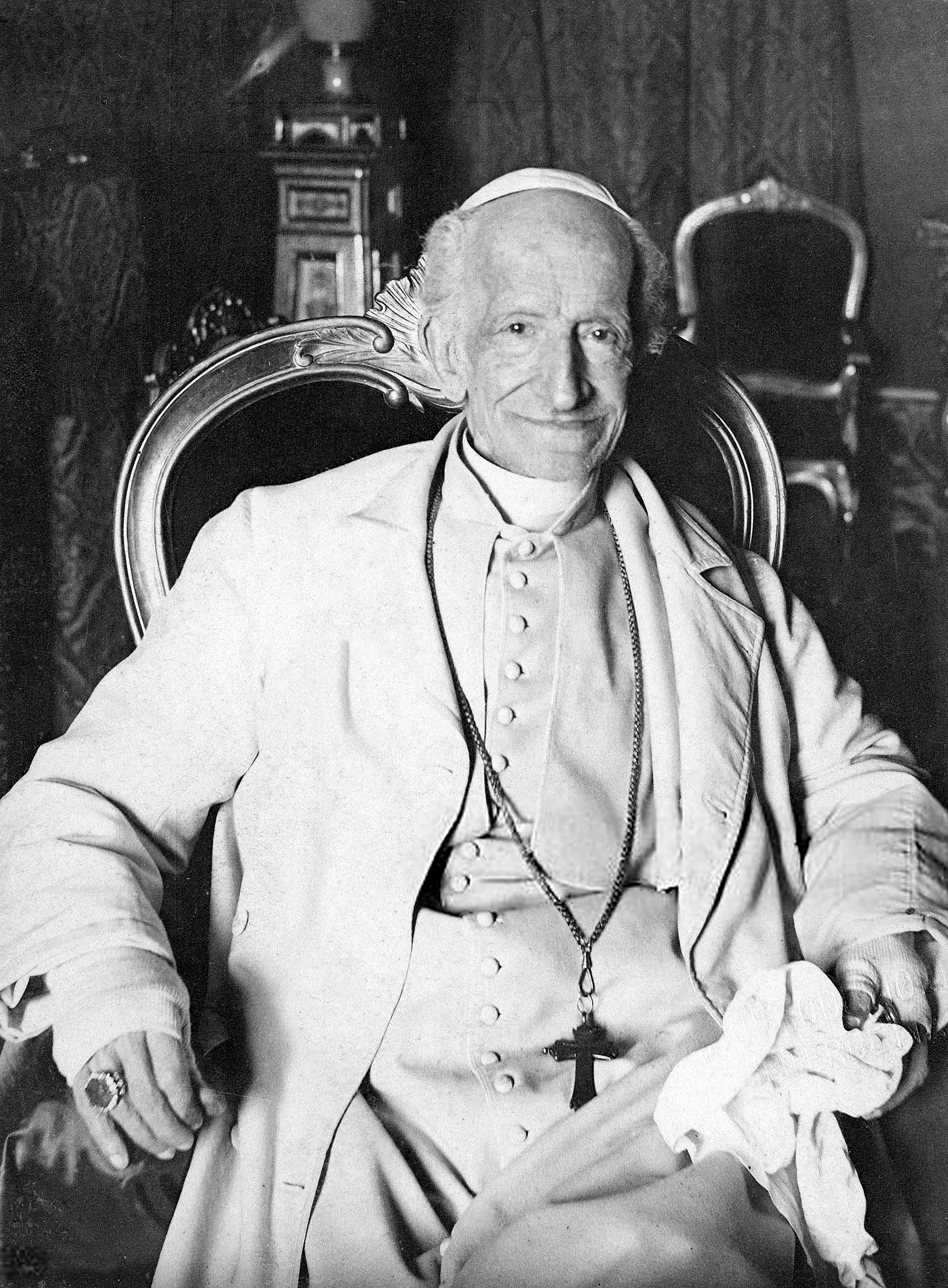
Pope Leo XIII

The Istituto per le Opere di Religione (IOR) was founded on 27 June 1942 by Pope Pius XII. It absorbed the Amministrazione per le Opere di Religione (Administration of the Works of Religion), which had originated in the Commission for Works of Charity (Commissione ad pias causas) established by Pope Leo XIII on 11 February 1887. The IOR is not a department of the Roman Curia, the central administrative structure of the Roman Catholic Church, nor is it a central bank. (Note: The central banking function of the Vatican is regulated by the Monetary Agreement between the European Union and the Vatican City State, Monetary Agreement between the European Union and the Vatican City State authorizing the use of the euro as the official currency of Vatican City. Implementation of that Agreement and oversight of the Vatican law against money laundering and financing of terrorism is in the hands of the Financial Information Authority established by Pope Benedict XVI on 30 December 2010. Motu proprio for the prevention and countering of illegal activities in the area of financial dealings, Pope requires full transparency of transactions in the Vatican)

The purpose of the IOR is "to provide for the safekeeping and administration of movable and immovable property transferred or entrusted to it by physical or juridical persons and intended for works of religion or charity".

In 2014, the Vatican officially confirmed the IOR's mission as provider of "specialized financial services to the Catholic Church worldwide." Furthermore, it was affirmed by the Vatican that the "valuable services that can be offered by the Institute assist the Holy Father in his mission as universal pastor and also aid those institutions and individuals who collaborate with him in his ministry".

== Corporate governance ==
According to its Statutes, in effect since 2023, the IOR is composed of four bodies:

A Commission of Cardinals with five members, appointed for renewable five-year terms, who elect their president. the Commission's members are:

- Giuseppe Petrocchi, former Archbishop of L'Aquila – President
- Luis Antonio Tagle, Pro-Prefect for the Section of Evangelization of Dicastery for Evangelization
- Konrad Krajewski, Papal Almoner
- Emil Paul Tscherrig, former nuncio to Italy and San Marino 2024.
- Ángel Fernández Artime, S.D.B., Pro-Prefect of the Dicastery for Institutes of Consecrated Life and Societies of Apostolic Life

The Prelate of the IOR, Mgr. Battista Ricca, appointed by the Supervisory Commission of Cardinals with the Pope's approval, acts as secretary of the Commission and attends meetings of the Board of Superintendence.

A Board of Superintendence, defining the strategy and ensuring oversight of operations.

- François Pauly, President
- Javier Marín Romano
- Georg Freiherr von Boeselager
- Bernard Brenninkmeijer
- Sheila Marie L. Uriarte-Tan
- Elizabeth McCaul
- Marina Natale

A Directorate, in charge of operational activities and accountable to the Board of Superintendence.

- Giovanni Boscia – General Director

== Financial information ==
Table with a comparison of IOR's financial performance over the last years.

Year	Total Equity (million €)	Net profit (million €)	Intermediation margin (million €)	Operating expenses (million €)	TIER 1 Ratio	Clients	Coverage of Catholic ethics principles (AUM products)
2024	731.915	32.759	51.506	23.752	69.4%		100%
2023	667.561	30.598	49.655	22.908	59.78%	12361	100%
2022	578.497	29.583	33.264	20.865	46.14%	12759	100%
2021	649.315	18.091	34.395	19.237	38.54%	14519	100%
2020	673.234	36.375	45.483	19.340	39.74%	14991	100%
2019	668.292	38.012	56.068	17.665	82.40%	14996	100%
2018	654.567	17.518	14.694	16.007	86.36%	14953	n.a.
2017	659.119	31.934	49.938	18.727	68.26%	14945	n.a.
2016	672.600	36.001	42.595	19.086	64.53%	14960	n.a.
2015	670.278	16.127	42.843	23.428	60.65%	14801	n.a.

== Controversies ==
=== Historical allegations ===
When the Holy See, whose tax-exempt status on income from Italian investments was revoked in 1968, decided to diversify its holdings, it employed as financial adviser Michele Sindona. Once among the country's most powerful businessmen, subsequent investigations into his business affairs brought to light questionable associations with the Mafia as well as the secret P2, a Masonic lodge that the Italian Parliament classified as a subversive organization. The 1974 failure of Sindona's Franklin National Bank and the subsequent collapse of his financial empire, into which he had channeled part of the Holy See's investments, entailed losses for the Vatican estimated by one source at 35 billion Italian lire (£20 million).

In 1982, a political and financial scandal connected with the collapse of Banco Ambrosiano involved the head of IOR from 1971 to 1989, Archbishop Paul Marcinkus, who allegedly had given "letters of patronage" on behalf of the IOR in support of the failed bank. In 1987, an Italian court issued a warrant against Marcinkus, whom they accused of being an accessory to fraudulent bankruptcy. Marcinkus evaded arrest by staying inside Vatican City until the warrant was dismissed in 1991, whereupon he returned to his home country, the United States. Chairman of the Banco Ambrosiano and member of the illegal Masonic lodge P2, Roberto Calvi was convicted of violating Italian currency laws and fled on a false passport to London where he was found murdered under Blackfriars Bridge in London some days after he went missing from Milan. The Istituto per le Opere di Religione, then a 10% shareholder of Banco Ambrosiano, denied legal responsibility for the Banco Ambrosiano's downfall but acknowledged "moral involvement", and paid US$224 million to creditors.

Several works published during the 1980s and 1990s were highly critical of the Institute for the Works of Religion's historical relations with anti-communist governments.

In reference other alleged covert activities, Tony Abse, writing in The Weekly Worker, an organ of the Communist Party of Great Britain, has said that the CIA used the Institute for the Works of Religion to funnel funds to the Solidarity Polish trade union "as part of the final offensive against the Soviet Union". The organization American Atheists says covert United States funds were channelled in the same way both to Solidarity and to Contra guerrillas.

Alperin v. Vatican Bank was a class action suit by Holocaust survivors against the Institute for the Works of Religion filed in San Francisco, California on 15 November 1999. The case was dismissed as a political question by the District Court for the Northern District of California in 2003, but reinstated in part by the Ninth Circuit Court of Appeals in 2005. That ruling has attracted attention as a precedent at the intersection of the Alien Tort Claims Act (ATCA) and the Foreign Sovereign Immunities Act (FSIA). The complaint against the Vatican Bank was dismissed in 2007 on the basis of sovereign immunity.

=== Judicial events and reorganisation (2010–2018) ===
On 22 September 2010, Italian magistrates seized €23 million from the IOR, on the grounds that the anti-money laundering laws in force had been violated. The money was originally to be transferred from the Italian Credito Artigiano to JPMorgan Chase and another Italian bank, Banca del Fucino. Both the origin and destination of the funds were accounts under the control of the IOR. It was furthermore declared that Gotti Tedeschi and another IOR manager were under investigation for money laundering charges. On 31 May 2011, Rome's attorney general released the €23 million in assets which had been seized in September, apparently in acknowledgment of the steps taken in the following months to conform the Institute to international standards.

On 24 May 2012, Ettore Gotti Tedeschi was ousted as Head of the Vatican Bank because of his alleged "failure to fulfill the primary functions of his office". In July 2013, the money laundering case against Gotti Tedeschi was dropped. In March 2014, he was again acquitted by the Roman court that followed the public prosecutor's position and relieved Gotti Tedeschi from any responsibility in that operation.

On 15 June 2013, with the approval of Pope Francis, the Cardinals' Commission appointed Monsignor Battista Mario Salvatore Ricca as the Institute's Prelate ad interim. There was also speculation that opponents of reform might have withheld information about possible scandals in Ricca's past or that they might have made up unfounded rumours about Ricca's past. It was reported that Ricca had offered his resignation because of the controversy, but the head of the Holy See's Press Office declared the accusations as "not credible" and Pope Francis himself informed journalists that an inquiry "found nothing".

On 28 June 2013, three persons were arrested by the Italian police on suspicion of corruption and fraud. Allegedly, they had planned to smuggle €20 million in cash from Switzerland into Italy. One of the arrested was Monsignore Nunzio Scarano, previously senior accountant at APSA, the Vatican's Administration of the Patrimony of the Apostolic See. Subsequently, he was indicted for corruption and slander and set under house arrest. On 21 January 2014, he was further charged with money laundering through IOR accounts in yet another investigation. According to a police statement, millions of euros in "false donations" from offshore companies had moved through Scarano's accounts. Already in July 2013, the IOR had frozen the money in Scarano's accounts. As news agency Reuters reported, Elena Guarino, the Salerno magistrate who led the investigation, told reporters "the Vatican was fully cooperative and gave her much information on Scarano's bank movements.". In January 2016, Scarano was acquitted of allegations of corruption, but was given a two-year sentence after being convicted of lesser charges of making false allegations. His money laundering trial in his hometown of Salerno was still pending at this time. The other person arrested was a bank person and a former secret service agent.

In February 2017, a court in Rome convicted two former top Vatican Bank officials Paolo Cipriani and Massimo Tulliof for omissions in communications involving three small transfers. Cipriani was a former Vatican bank director and Tulliof was Cipriani's former deputy. They were, however, acquitted of a more serious money laundering charge, which involved $60 million in transfers, and were sentenced to four months and ten days in prison. They were also forced to return $6,000 each.

In 2018, Vatican prosecutors indicted former Vatican Bank President Angelo Caloia, and an attorney, Gabriele Liuzzo, for embezzling $62 million, using a real estate scam, between 2001 and 2006. Caloia and Liuzzo were convicted and sentenced to 8 years and 11 months in prison in 2021.

== Process of reform ==
=== Institutional milestones ===
In August 2019, the IOR was re-structured by a chirograph of Pope Francis, which established the IOR's present Statutes. According to Article 4 of the Chirograph, the Institute consists of four bodies: A Supervisory Commission of Cardinals, a Board of Superintendence, a Prelate and a Directorate.

=== Reform steps 2010/2011 ===
On 1 January 2010, a renegotiated monetary agreement between the EU and the Vatican City State entered into force, supplementing the monetary agreement between the Vatican City State and Italy from the year 2000. Having signed the agreement, the Vatican transposed EU legislation on euro counterfeiting and money laundering by the end of 2010 and accepted the European Court of Justice as the only jurisdiction responsible for settling disputes under the agreement.

On 30 December 2010, Pope Benedict XVI established the Vatican's independent Financial Intelligence Authority (Autorità di Informazione Finanziaria, AIF) to oversee the monetary and commercial activities of all Vatican-related institutions, including the IOR. The Vatican's so-called "financial watchdog" monitors all Vatican financial operations and ensures they conform with international norms against money-laundering and the financing of terrorism.

In June 2011, Roman prosecutors ordered the release of €23 million that should have been transferred via an IOR account at Credito Artigiano. According to the prosecutors, this request of release was due to the newly instituted mechanisms that should help the Institute to conform to international anti-money laundering and antiterrorist financing standards, such as the AIF's establishment.

=== Reform steps 2012 ===
In July 2012, Moneyval, the Council of Europe's Committee of Experts on the Evaluation of Anti-Money Laundering Measures and the Financing of Terrorism, published and issued a report on the Vatican City State, by request of the Vatican itself. This was the first time that the Holy See had submitted its institutions and laws to the judgment of an international external auditor. The Italian news magazine l'Espresso called this "an historic watershed". The Vatican received grades of "compliant" or "largely compliant" on 22 out of 45 guidelines and adhered to international standards in 9 out of the 16 core points.

Moneyval stated that the Vatican "has come a long way in a very short period of time" and stated that the city state met the international requirements in 9 out of 16 core topics. At the same time, Moneyval requested further reforms to be enacted The Vatican expressed a goal to get into the so-called OECD white list which includes countries that comply with international anti-money laundering standards and regulations against tax offences.

In November 2012, a Swiss anti-money laundering expert, René Brülhart, was appointed director of the AIF. Previously, he had worked for the Financial Intelligence Unit in Liechtenstein as well as for the Egmont Group of Financial Intelligence Units.

=== Reform steps 2013 ===
On 15 February 2013, Ernst von Freyberg was appointed the IOR's President. Since the beginning of his tenure at the IOR, von Freyberg has focused on comprehensively reforming the Institute, stating he would focus on transparency and have a "zero tolerance" approach to any suspicious transactions.

In May 2013, the international consulting and auditing firm Promontory was assigned a forensic review and screening of the Institute's client relationships. In this context, all accounts of the IOR's 19,000 customers would be checked.

On 24 June 2013, Pope Francis created a Pontifical Commission, often referred to as the CRIOR commission, to review the IOR's status and activities. Its task was to "gather accurate information on the legal status and various activities of the Institute to permit, when necessary, a better harmonization of the said Institute with the universal mission of the Apostolic See". Its five members were Raffaele Farina (President) Jean-Louis Pierre Tauran, Juan Ignacio Arrieta Ochoa de Chinchetru, Peter Bryan Wells (secretary) and Mary Ann Glendon. The commission terminated its work in May 2014.

In July 2013, the Holy See's Financial Intelligence Authority, charged with monitoring the monetary and commercial activities of Vatican agencies, was admitted as a full member of the Egmont Group, an international network of financial intelligence units.

On 1 October 2013, the IOR published its first ever annual report. The annual report is available for download on the Institute's homepage which was launched in July 2013. The report's figures were audited by the global accounting firm KPMG. According to the report, the Institute in 2012 had a net profit of €86.6 million, of which it has transferred €54.7 million to the budget of the Holy See to help the pope carry out the church's global mission. Both measures – the annual report's publication and the launch of the website – were reviewed as remarkable signs of enhanced transparency and compliance: The Guardian called the website launch a "giant leap" and Reuters named it a "transparency drive". On 12 June 2017 IOR published its fifth annual report, showing net gains of €36 million for the year 2016.

Also in October 2013, newspapers reported that the IOR had requested around 1,300 customers to close their accounts. Allegedly, this request was directed at lay account holders, who do not fit into any of the five categories of clients the IOR is legally allowed to have. The closures are said to be a result of the review process conducted by Promontory.

On 12 December 2013, Moneyval published its Progress Report that assessed the Holy See's progress made on measures to combat money laundering. It was stated that the IOR has made significant progress but at the same time needed more institutionalized internal controls, especially with regard to the AIF's watchdog function. Overall, the report was rated as the approval of the economic and financial reforms enacted since Pope Francis' taking office.

=== Reform steps 2014 ===
On 22 January 2014, the IOR published a report on the progress of the compliance and transparency program. IOR President Ernst von Freyberg commented on the release, stating that "it is very possible to reform an institution like the IOR" and that the Institute has "used the past year to create the system and to analyse our customers for possible irregularities". Von Freyberg also stated much work needs to be done as regards transparency and compliance.

On 7 April 2014, Pope Francis ruled the IOR will stay operative and approved recommendations on the Institute's future, which were drawn up jointly by the papal commissions CRIOR and COSEA, by the IOR's management and by Australian Cardinal George Pell, head of the Vatican's Secretariat for the Economy. The decision was interpreted as a "backing" of the process of reform that had been intensified under Pope Francis and von Freyberg. The IOR itself stated that the Pope's decision "represents a powerful endorsement of our very mission and the hard work accomplished over the past 12 months." Von Freyberg stepped down in July as head of the IOR and Pope Francis named Jean-Baptiste de Franssu to replace him.

In September 2014, the Cardinals' Commission of the IOR appointed Mauricio Larraín (Chile) and Carlo Salvatori (Italy) as members to the IOR Board of Superintendence. Other members included Jean-Baptiste de Franssu (France), President of the Board, Clemens Boersig (Germany), Mary Ann Glendon (US) and Michael Hintze (UK). In addition to these six lay members of the Board, Monsignor Alfred Xuereb, Secretary-General of the Secretariat for the Economy, served as its non-voting Secretary. From January 2017 additional members added to the board were: Scott C. Malpass (US), Javier Marín Romano (Spain), and Georg Freiherr von Boeselager (Germany).

=== 2023 ===
In March 2023, a chirograph of Pope Francis was published, whose goal is "to further renew the Statute of the Institute for the Works of Religion to make it consistent with the most modern organizational requirements as well as with the operational needs that arise daily in the Institute's activities".

== See also ==
- Administration of the Patrimony of the Apostolic See
- Christian finance
- Economy of the Vatican City
- Index of Vatican City-related articles
- Prefecture for the Economic Affairs of the Holy See
- Vatileaks
- 1832 Rothschild loan to the Holy See
- Criticism of the Catholic Church § Financial corruption
- List of banks in the euro area
