= Mikhail Kasyanov =

Prime Minister of Russia from 2000 to 2004

- Михаил Касьянов
- Kasyanov in 2016

Prime Minister of Russia
- In office 7 May 2000 – 24 February 2004 (acting until 17 May 2000)
- President: Vladimir Putin
- Preceded by: Vladimir Putin
- Succeeded by: Mikhail Fradkov

First Deputy Prime Minister of Russia
- In office 10 January 2000 – 17 May 2000
- Prime Minister: Vladimir Putin
- Preceded by: Viktor Khristenko
- Succeeded by: Dmitry Medvedev (2005)

Minister of Finance
- In office 25 May 1999 – 18 May 2000
- President: Boris Yeltsin; Vladimir Putin (acting)
- Prime Minister: Sergei Stepashin; Vladimir Putin; Himself (acting)
- Preceded by: Mikhail Zadornov
- Succeeded by: Alexei Kudrin

Personal details
- Born: 8 December 1957 (age 68) Solntsevo, Russian SFSR, Soviet Union
- Party: Independent (2000–2006); People's Democratic Union (2006–2010); People's Freedom Party "For Russia." (2010–2012); People's Freedom Party (2012–2023)
- Spouse: Irina Kasyanova
- Children: Natalia; Alexandra
- Occupation: Politician, businessman
- Kasyanov's voice Recorded 19 November 2012

Mikhail Mikhailovich Kasyanov (Note: In this name that follows East Slavic naming customs, the patronymic is Mikhailovich and the family name is Kasyanov.) (Note: Russian: Михаи́л Миха́йлович Касья́нов, pronounced [mʲɪxɐˈil mʲɪˈxajləvʲɪtɕ kɐˈsʲjanəf]) (born 8 December 1957) is a Russian politician who served as Prime Minister of Russia from 2000 to 2004. Previously, he had served as First Deputy Prime Minister in 2000 and Minister of Finance from 1999 to 2000. During the 1990s, he worked in President Boris Yeltsin's administration in different positions before joining President Vladimir Putin's first administration. He has the federal state civilian service rank of 1st class Active State Councillor of the Russian Federation.

Since leaving the government over disagreements on economic policy in 2004, he has become one of the leading critics of President Putin and an opposition leader. In 2008, Kasyanov was a candidate in the election of President of Russia but in the middle of the campaign was denied participation on political grounds. In 2010, he co-founded the coalition People's Freedom Party "For Russia without Lawlessness and Corruption" and became one of the leaders of the People's Freedom Party.

He was an active speaker during the 2011–2013 Russian protests for fair elections. Since 2015, he has served as the leader of the political party People's Freedom Party (PARNAS). From 2005 to 2007, he was one of the leaders of the opposition coalition The Other Russia and democratic protest movement.

== Early life ==
Kasyanov was born on 8 December 1957 in the settlement of Solntsevo near Moscow. His father was a teacher of mathematics and the headmaster of a local school. Joining the Red Army, his father participated in some major actions of the Second World War and fought until the victory in 1945.

Kasyanov's mother was an economist, a head of a department of a governmental construction company (Glavmosstroy). In his childhood Mikhail studied at a music school and played the cello. In high school he played in a rock group. In 1974 Kasyanov entered the Moscow Automobile and Road Construction University.

In 1976–1978, Kasyanov served in the Soviet Army in the guard of honour at the Office of the Commandant of Moscow, which is today the Kremlin Regiment of the Federal Protective Service. From 1978–1981, he became a technician and then an engineer at the scientific institute of the State Committee for Construction of USSR. At the time he was still studying at the Moscow Automobile and Road Construction University. He finished in 1981.

For nine years after graduation Kasyanov worked at the State Planning Committee (GosPlan) as an engineer, economist, leading specialist and chief of sector. In 1987 he was awarded the diploma of the Highest Economy Courses at GosPlan.

== Career ==
=== Ministry of Economy (1990–1993) ===
In 1990–1993, Kasyanov was working in the State Committee of Economy of the Russian Federation and then in the Ministry of Economy. In 1993 the Minister of Finance Boris Fyodorov invited Kasyanov to join the Ministry. He was appointed the head of Foreign Loans and External Debt Department.

=== Deputy then Minister of Finance (1995–1999) ===
In 1995 Kasyanov became the deputy Minister of Finance.

In 1994–1996, Kasyanov was occupied with the restructuring of Soviet externals debts (about $150 bn). In 1996 Kasyanov reached an agreement with the Paris Club and the London Club of creditors for a comprehensive restructuring of Soviet debts for a period of 25 years with a 7-year grace period. Thanks to this agreement Russia was able to gain access to international capital markets.

In 1996, Kasyanov gave the road show of Russia's economy development prospects at International finance centers. As a result, Russia, for the first time since 1913 issued securities, eurobonds on the capital markets of Europe and the United States, and Russian banks and companies were able to take cheap foreign capital for investments into the economy of the country.

The 1997 Asian financial crisis and the 1998 Russian financial crisis led to Russia defaulting on its debts, and the ruble was dramatically devaluated. Kasyanov was the head of the working team for restructuring Russian government external debts and of the private banks of the country. At the same time he negotiated with Russian creditors for restructuring domestic debts. Kasyanov negotiated with the International Monetary Fund which granted favorable perspectives for reaching profitable agreements for Russia. As a result of this, the ruble rate was stabilised, which in its own turn helped reduce the inflation and restored production and services parts of Russian economy. These successes proved Kasyanov to be a good negotiator: he was called "the principal financial diplomat of the country".

=== Minister of Finance (1999–2000) ===
In February 1999 he was appointed First Deputy Minister and in May 1999 President Yeltsin appointed Kasyanov Minister of Finance of the Russian Federation.

In June 1999, Minister Kasyanov became a member of the Security Council of Russia.

Kasyanov was occupied with the problem of budget deficit and external debt. His time as Finance Minister saw Russia's first non-deficit budget. In July Russia received the first post-crisis loan from the IMF.

The government of Sergei Stepashin worked for three months; however, Kasyanov retained his post in the new government of Vladimir Putin. He continued the negotiations with international creditors on a global restructuring of the USSR's debts.

The war in Chechnya provoked the suspension of the negotiations with the London club of creditors. Nevertheless, Kasyanov was able to resolve the principal problems of Russian debts in a span of several months. This fact facilitated the transition towards economic growth in Russia. As a result of non-deficit budget and prudent financial policy in general the multi-month delays in salary payments and pensions were overcome. On 10 January 2000 Kasyanov was appointed the first Vice Premier of the Russian government. The situation was such that effectively Kasyanov was in charge of the government, serving as its chairman, as Putin was the Acting President at the time. He was still the head of the Ministry of Finance.

=== Prime Minister (2000–2004) ===
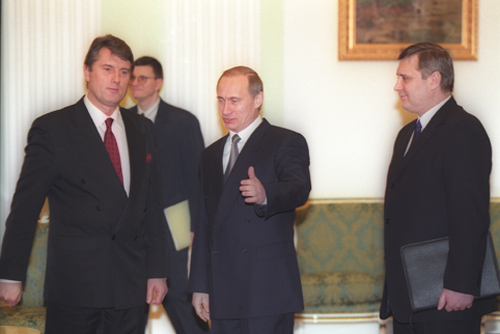
Putin, Kasyanov and Ukrainian Prime Minister Viktor Yushchenko in Moscow, 2000

On 17 May 2000, Russian State Duma approved Mikhail Kasyanov's Prime Minister candidacy. The Chairman of the Cabinet started pursuing the policy of active collaboration with business community and civil society.

During its four-year term Kasyanov's Cabinet launched a number of structural reforms – tax and budget reform, liberalization of capital control and external trade, customs reform, reorganization of national infrastructure, pension reform, creation of land market and others. Successful implementation of systemic transformation measures led Russia to a trajectory of sustainable economic growth. Inflation was reduced significantly, the economy and people's income grew by one third while oil prices were at the level of $20–25 per barrel.

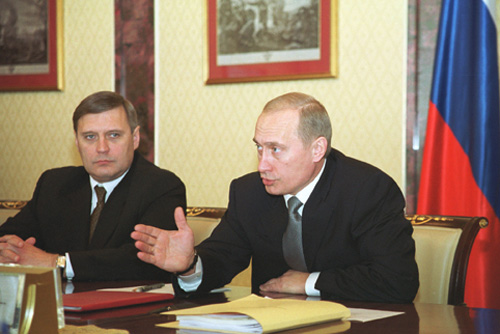
Kasyanov with Vladimir Putin, 2000

Experts think that the tax reform of 2000-2002 was one of the most successful reforms of Kasyanov's Cabinet. A flat income tax rate (13%) was introduced. All turnover taxes were eliminated. VAT was reduced to 18% and social taxes — to 26%. These measures together with the policy of strong fiscal discipline significantly increased budget revenue.

In 2003, Kasyanov's Cabinet reformed the taxation of petroleum sector and established a special Stabilization fund. As a result, the budget revenue stream from this sector has increased and the Stabilization Fund has started accumulating significant amounts of foreign exchange, creating a financial airbag for the country. It was a time of an overall financial liberalization.

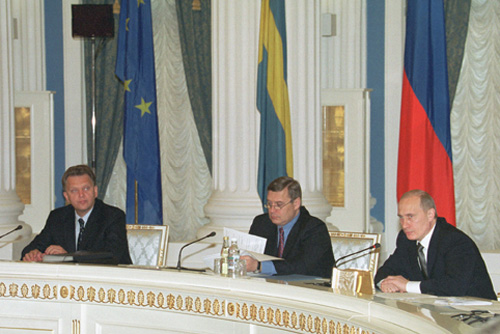
Putin, Kasyanov and Deputy Prime Minister Viktor Khristenko at the 7th Russia-EU Summit in Moscow, May 2001

An important achievement of Kasyanov's Cabinet was the successful implementation of the small business encouragement policy. Introduction of simplified taxation system, easy state registration of businesses and ban on frequent inspections by state agencies were among those measures.

It was during Mikhail Kasyanov's time as Russian Prime Minister that the transfer of agricultural lands to private property began. Additionally to that credit support mechanism for agricultural production was introduced and Russia very rapidly again became one of the leading exporters of grain after decades of huge annual import of wheat.

Kasyanov was dismissed, along with the entire Russian cabinet, by President Vladimir Putin on 24 February 2004 after more than three years in office, two weeks before the 2004 Russian presidential election on 14 March. There were disagreements between Kasyanov and Putin on matters of policy. The President stated on national television "This decision bears no relation to any assessment of the performance of the former composition of the government. It was dictated by my desire to once again delineate my position on the issue of what development course the country will take after March 14, 2004."

== Political activity after resignation ==
=== After leaving the government (2004–2008) ===
On the first anniversary of his dismissal (24 February 2005) Kasyanov gave a press conference at which he said that he might run for president in the 2008 elections. His bid was supported by Leonid Nevzlin, Boris Berezovsky and Garry Kasparov.

In April 2006, Mikhail Kasyanov was elected Chairman of the People's Democratic Union (PDU), a newly launched NGO. PDU was one of the co-founders of the first "The Other Russia" conference in July 2006 and of "The Other Russia" coalition that was set up at the conference. Kasyanov and the PDU were actively involved in the coalition's work and took part in the Dissenters' Marches in Moscow and St. Petersburg – the first protest manifestations in many years. On 3 March 2007, Kasparov and Kasyanov spoke against Putin's government to thousands of supporters at the Saint Petersburg Dissenters' March.

At a presentation in International Institute for Strategic Studies 26 June 2006, Kasyanov criticized Putin's administration. He said: "Separation of powers has been effectively demolished and replaced by the so-called ‘Vertical of Power' which is based on the false idea that all the meaningful social and political processes must be kept under control by the state. The government and parliament cannot function any longer without daily instructions. The judiciary is increasingly servile. Independent TV does not exist any more at the federal level and is being quickly uprooted in the regions. Moreover, the state-owned companies and the state itself increase their grip over the electronic and printed media. Responsibility of the regional level of power is totally destroyed by the abolishment of direct elections for the governors."

PDU had regional branches in 75 regions of Russia. In June 2007 Kasyanov was nominated by the PDU as a candidate for the presidential elections. In September 2007 the new political party People for Democracy and Justice (Народ за демократию и справедливость) was established on the basis of the PDU, and Kasyanov was elected its chairman.

==== Fraud accusations and court case (2005–2007) ====
Allegations that Kasyanov took a two percent commission in exchange for ignoring bribes and illegal business ventures whilst he was working at the Ministry of Finance between 1993 and 1999 were made in the state-controlled Russian media which branded him as "Misha 2 percent". In an article by Peter J. Stavrakis entitled "Russia's evolution as a predatory state" (part of a compilation entitled "Russia's uncertain economic future", written for the United States Congressional Joint Economic Committee), the allegations were unsurprisingly described as credible.

In July 2005, State Duma deputy from the United Russia faction Alexander Khinshtein made accusations against Mikhail Kasyanov; according to Khinshtein, Kasyanov, when he was prime minister, privatized Sosnovka-1, the former state dacha of Mikhail Suslov, a former member of the Politburo of the Communist Party of the Soviet Union, in 2003 at a reduced price.

The Prosecutor General's Office used the published materials as a reason to initiate a criminal case on 1 July 2005 against the general director of FSUE VPK Invest Ramil Gaisin under Article 165 Part 3 of the Criminal Code of the Russian Federation ("causing property damage on an especially large scale by deception or abuse of trust"). The publication of the materials and the message from the Prosecutor General's Office about the initiation of a criminal case coincided with Kasyanov's stay on vacation abroad:

I returned to Moscow despite the threats made against me. I have no doubt that the systematically launched slanderous campaign to discredit me, based on lies and distortion of facts, is part of the general strategy of the authorities to completely cleanse the political field. The results of the implementation of such a strategy are obvious - growing social alienation and uncertainty among citizens about their future, a slowdown in economic growth against the backdrop of record export prices, and a steady decline in Russia's international authority. Creating conditions for a real, non-sham political process involving public discussion of different points of view about the situation in the country and freedom to choose between them is a task that I will continue to work on.

In July 2005, the Russian Office of Public Prosecutor started investigating the privatization of two houses formerly owned by the government. According to the court verdict in March 2007, Kasyanov was to return a house and pay 108,135,000 rubles in damages to the government for using the property illegally (approx. USD 4,150,000 or €3,130,000). In 2007, Kasyanov was still planning to appeal.

Khinshtein's assumptions were not confirmed. The Sosnovka-1 facility was acquired by Kasyanov legally after he left government service. In 1996, the Evikhon company leased the facility for 49 years from the State Property Committee, then Sosnovka-1 was transferred to the management of the VPK-Invest company, which in 2003 received the right to sell dachas. First, Sosnovka-1 was acquired by the Amelia company, and in 2004, it was resold to Mikhail Kasyanov. In 2006, the Moscow Arbitration Court recognized Kasyanov as a bona fide purchaser and refused to return the property to the state. However, the Federal Agency for State Property Management filed new claims, and in 2007, by a court decision, the dacha was returned to state ownership.

A Der Spiegel article from 2007 notes that Kasyanov insists that his only earnings as a public servant were his government salary, and he has only been involved in private business ventures for "one year" since leaving the post of prime minister. The same article also supported Khinshtein's claim about Sosnovka-1.

=== 2008 presidential candidacy ===
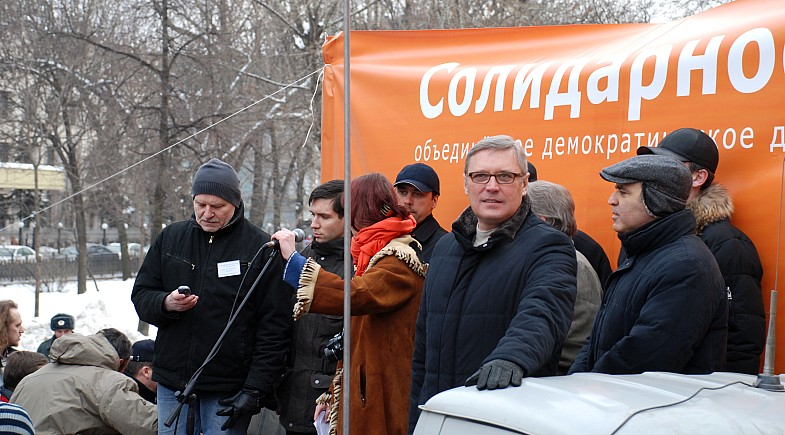
Mikhail Kasyanov at a rally of the Solidarnost movement on 21 February 2009

In 2006, Kasyanov declared that he desired to establish a new political party and run for president in 2008.

Kasyanov left the opposition group The Other Russia in July 2007 due to the group's failure to agree on a single presidential candidate.

Kasyanov established the Russian Popular Democratic Union party. However, the Federal Registration Service blocked the party from participating in the 2007 legislative election.

It was not known whether Kasyanov would continue his candidacy after Garry Kasparov entered the race, but on 8 December 2007 he reaffirmed he would run in the election. That day Russian Popular Democratic Union Party nominated Kasyanov as their presidential candidate.

On 16 January 2008, he announced that he had finished collecting the 2 million signatures necessary to run as a candidate. Later that month, however, the Central Election Commission rejected his candidacy on the grounds that 13.36% of the signatures were invalid, and he was disqualified. Kasyanov appealed the decision to the Supreme Court, which rejected the appeal on 6 February 2008.

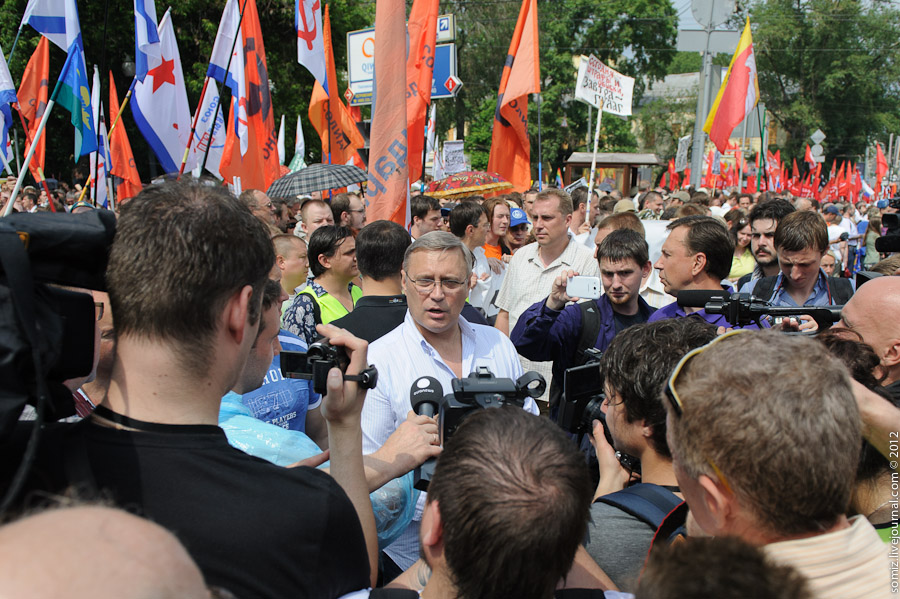
Kasyanov during the 2011–2013 Russian protests

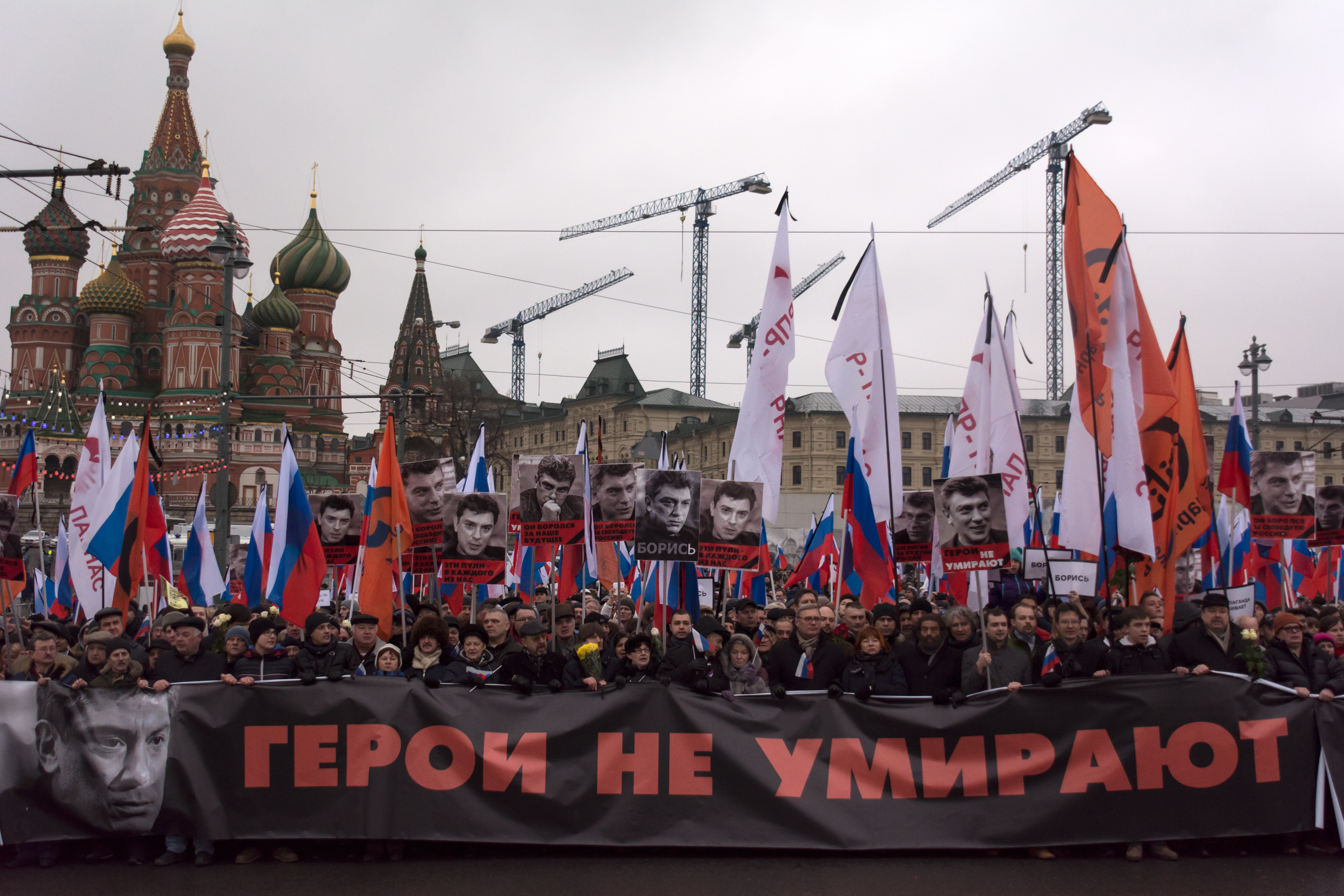
Kasyanov takes part in a march in memory of assassinated opposition politician Boris Nemtsov in Moscow, 1 March 2015

Kasyanov claimed that the decision to prevent his candidacy was taken by Putin himself, who he claimed was afraid that, in a fair election, Dmitry Medvedev might lose.

Kasyanov described the elections as a farce and called for a boycott.

=== Author: "Without Putin" (2009) ===
The presentation of Kasyanov's book Without Putin in the Ukrainian capital Kyiv on 18 December 2009 was cancelled merely minutes before its planned opening. Kasyanov's press secretary claimed that the electricity went out in the Premier Palace Hotel on Taras Shevchenko Boulevard minutes before the presentation was to start and that some 20 young men had blocked the entrance to the hotel to keep attendees from entering.

=== Kadyrov's threats against Kasyanov (2016) ===
In February 2016, Kasyanov's image was posted online by Chechen leader Ramzan Kadyrov on his social media account, with Kasyanov being in cross hairs of a sniper rifle. This was seen as a threat against Kasyanov. On 10 February, Kasyanov was attacked in a Moscow restaurant by a dozen men who yelled death threats at him.

=== Defection over Ukraine (2022) ===
He opposed the Russian invasion of Ukraine. In May 2022, Kasyanov participated in the 8th "Russia Forum" in Vilnius, together with Khodorkovsky, the Russian oil oligarch and former head of Russian oil and gas giant Yukos, the head of the US-think tank Freedom House, the head of the US-government funded broadcaster Radio Free Europe and others. The aim of the "anti-Putin summit" was to develop a strategy on how to "de-Putinise" Russia and "slay the Russian bear", meaning Vladimir Putin.

In June 2022, Kasyanov told Agence France-Presse that he had temporarily left Russia, without providing additional details and as of June 2023, he is in the Latvian capital of Riga.

In November 2023, Russia's Justice Ministry said he was added to the list of "foreign agents". In November 2025, he was included in the Russian government's federal database of “terrorists and extremists”.

== Timeline ==
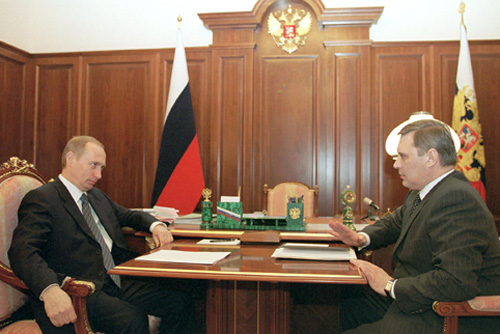
Vladimir Putin and Mikhail Kasyanov on 21 February 2001

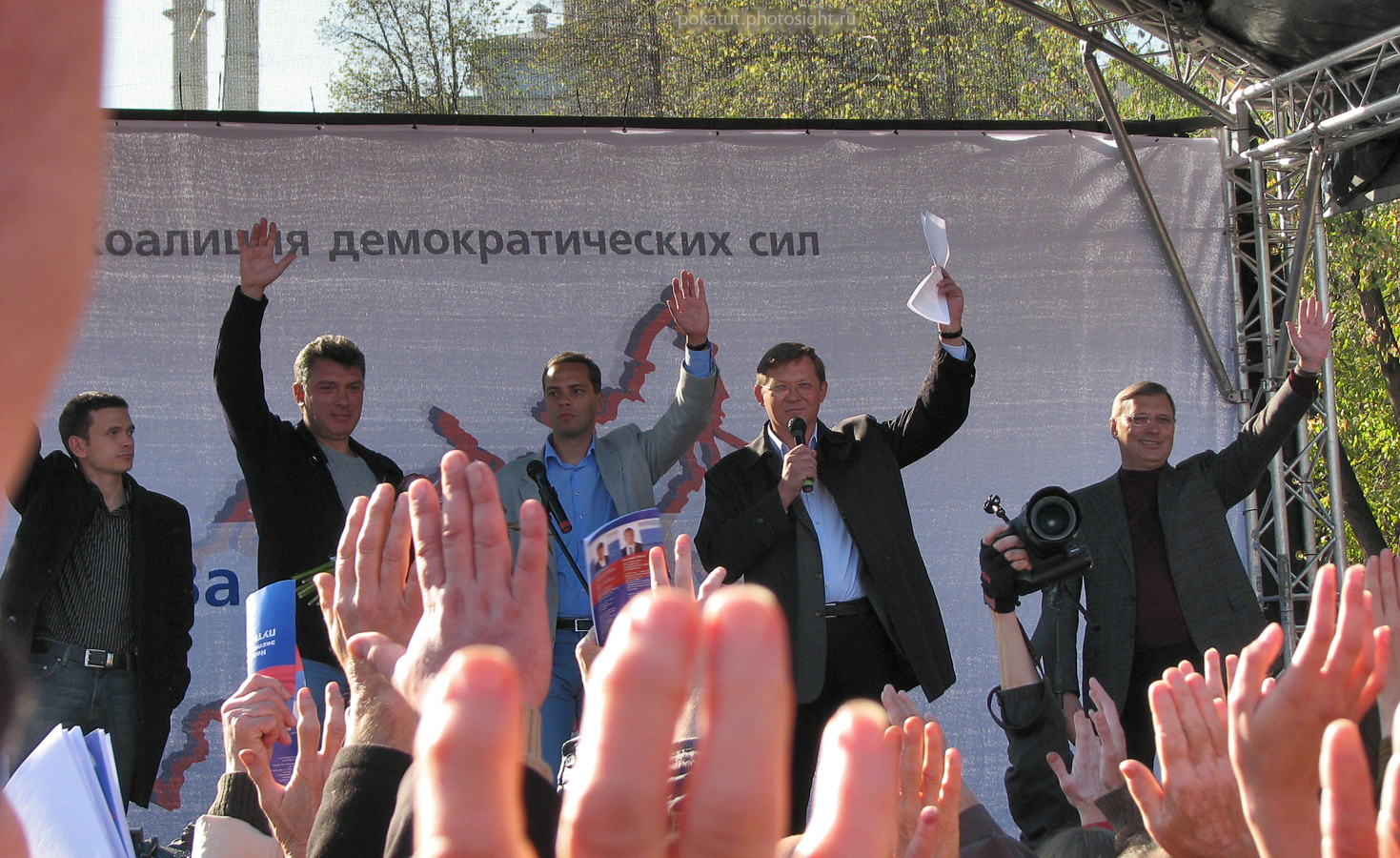
Kasyanov at an opposition meeting with Boris Nemtsov, Vladimir Milov, Vladimir Ryzhkov and Ilya Yashin on 9 October 2010

- 1981–90: Engineer; leading economist; Senior Specialist; Head of Section, Department of Foreign Economic Relations of the State Planning Committee of the RSFSR.
- 1990: appointed Head of Section, Sub-department of Foreign Economic Relations of the State Planning Committee of the RSFSR.
- 1991: Deputy Head, Sub-department, then Head, Sub-department of Foreign Economic Relations of the Ministry of Economy of the Russian Federation.
- 1992–93: Head, Consolidation Department of the Ministry of Economy of the Russian Federation.
- 1993–95: Head, Department of Foreign Credits and External Debt of the Ministry of Finance of the Russian Federation and member of the board of the Ministry of Finance.
- 1995: appointed Deputy Minister of Finance.
- 1999: appointed First Deputy Minister of Finance.
- May 1999: appointed Minister of Finance of the Russian Federation.
- January 2000: appointed First Deputy Prime Minister of the Russian Federation.
- May 2000: Prime Minister of the Russian Federation.
- February 2004: Sacked by President Putin along with the entire cabinet.
- March 2005: Mikhail Kasyanov launched his advisory firm MK Analytica. He started to vocally criticize Russian authorities for their anti-democratic drift and declared his intention to take part in the presidential elections in 2008 to change the general political course of the country.
- April 2006: Chairman of the People's Democratic Union (PDU), a newly launched NGO.
- June 2007: Nominated by the PDU as a candidate for the presidential elections.
- July 2007: due to the group's failure to agree on a single presidential candidate Kasyanov leaves The Other Russia.
- September 2007: Chairman of the new political party "People for Democracy and Justice" established on the basis of PDU.
- December 2007: approved by a congress of supporters as a candidate for the presidential elections.
- January 2008: The Central Election Commission of Russia barred his candidacy for the presidential elections, citing an excess of forgeries within his required two million signatures.
- November 2014: Appeared before the House of Lords EU External Affairs Sub-Committee in London Houses of Parliament to be questioned regarding his opinion as to how the European Union should best respond to Russian military intervention in Ukraine.

== See also ==
- Mikhail Kasyanov's Cabinet
- Zelyonka attack

== Notes ==
Political offices
Preceded by Mikhail Zadornov	Minister of Finance; 1998–2000	Succeeded by Alexei Kudrin
Preceded by Vladimir Putin	Deputy Prime Minister of Russia; 2000	Vacant Title next held by Dmitry Medvedev
Preceded by Vladimir Putin	Prime Minister of Russia; 2000–2004	Succeeded by Mikhail Fradkov
