= Intergroups in the European Parliament =

Intergroups are formed of Members of the European Parliament from any political group and any committee, with a view to holding informal exchanges of views on particular subjects and promoting contact between Members and civil society. Intergroups are not Parliament bodies and may not express Parliament's opinion.

Intergroups are subject to internal rules adopted by the Conference of Presidents on 16 December 1999 (last updated on 14 February 2008), which set out the conditions under which intergroups may be established at the beginning of each parliamentary term and their operating rules. Chairs of intergroups are required to declare any support they receive in cash or kind, according to the same criteria applicable to Members as individuals. The declarations must be updated every year and are filed in a public register held by the Quaestors.

== List of Intergroups (2024–2029) ==
- Intergroup on Anti-Corruption [IG10-01]
- Intergroup on Anti-Racism and Diversity [IG10-02]
- Intergroup on Attracting Investment to Ensure a Competitive and Sustainable European Union [IG10-03]
- Intergroup on Biodiversity, Hunting and Countryside [IG10-04]
- Intergroup on Cancer and Rare Diseases [IG10-05]
- Intergroup on Children's Rights [IG10-06]
- Intergroup on Christians in the Middle East [IG10-07]
- Intergroup on Cohesion Policy and Outermost Regions [IG10-08]
- Intergroup on Demography [IG10-09]
- Intergroup on Disability [IG10-10]
- Intergroup on European Cultural Heritage, Ways of Saint James and other European Cultural Routes [IG10-11]
- Intergroup on Fighting against Poverty [IG10-12]
- Intergroup on Freedom of Religion, Belief and Conscience [IG10-13]
- Intergroup on the Future of Education and Skills for a Competitive Europe [IG10-14]
- Intergroup on Sustainable Livestock [IG10-15]
- Intergroup on LGBTIQ+ [IG10-16]
- Intergroup on Mental Health [IG10-17]
- Intergroup on the Police [IG10-18]
- Intergroup on Resilience, Disaster Management and Civil Protection [IG10-19]
- Intergroup on Seas, Rivers, Islands and Coastal Areas (SEARICA) [IG10-20]
- Intergroup on Sky and Space [IG10-21]
- Intergroup on Small and Medium-Sized Enterprises (SMEs) [IG10-22]
- Intergroup on the Social Economy and Services of General Interest [IG10-23]
- Intergroup on Trade Unions [IG10-24]
- Intergroup on Traditional Minorities, National Communities and Languages [IG10-25]
- Intergroup on the Two-State Solution for Israel and Palestine [IG10-26]
- Intergroup on the Welfare and Conservation of Animals [IG10-27]
- Intergroup on Wine, Quality Foodstuffs and Spirits [IG10-28]

== List of Intergroups (2019–2024) ==
- Anti-corruption
- Anti-racism and diversity
- Artificial Intelligence and Digital
- Biodiversity, hunting, countryside
- Cancer
- Children's rights
- Christians in the Middle East
- Climate change, biodiversity and sustainable development
- Sustainable, Long-term investments & Competitive European Industry
- Demographic challenges, family-work balance and youth transition
- Disability
- European cultural heritage, Ways of Saint-James and other European cultural routes
- Fighting against poverty
- Freedom of religion and religious tolerance
- Green New deal
- LGBTI
- Rural, Mountainous and remote areas (RUMRA) and smart villages
- SEARICA
- Sky and Space
- SME
- Social economy
- Trade Unions
- Traditional minorities, national communities and languages
- Urban
- Welfare and conservation of animals
- Western Sahara
- Wine, spirit and foodstuffs

== List of Intergroups (2014–2019) ==
- Active ageing, intergenerational solidarity & family policies
- Anti-racism and diversity
- Biodiversity, countryside, hunting and recreational fisheries
- Children's rights Members
- Climate change, sustainable development and biodiversity
- Common goods and public services
- Creative industries
- Digital agenda
- Disability
- Extreme poverty and human rights
- European tourism development, cultural heritage, Way of St. James and other European cultural routes
- Freedom of religion or belief and religious tolerance
- Integrity – Transparency, anti- corruption and organised crime Members
- Lesbian, Gay, Bisexual, Transgender and Intersex rights – LGBTI Members
- Long-term investment and reindustrialisation
- Rural, mountainous and remote areas
- Seas, rivers, islands and coastal areas
- SMEs – Small and medium-sized enterprises Members
- Sky and Space
- Social economy
- Sports
- Trade Unions
- Traditional minorities, National communities and Languages
- Urban
- Welfare and conservation of animals
- Western Sahara
- Wine, spirits and quality foodstuffs
- Youth

== List of Intergroups (2009–2014) ==
- Sustainable Hunting, Biodiversity, Countryside Activities and Forests
- Ways of Saint James / Caminos de Santiago 28/01/2010
- Media
- Urban
- Public Services (SGI – SSGI)
- Trade Union
- Western Sahara
- Tibet
- Disability
- Water/Wasser
- Traditional National Minorities, Constitutional Regions and Regional Languages
- Mountains, Islands and Sparsely-Populated Regions
- Baltic-Europe
- Lesbian, Gay, Bisexual & Transgender Rights – LGBT
- Social Economy / Economie Sociale
- Mers et Zones Côtières / Seas and Coastal Areas
- Sky and Space / Ciel et Espace
- Anti-racisme & Diversity
- Youth Issues / Jeunesse
- Family and the Right of the Child & Bioethics
- Viticulture, Fruits et Legumes, Tradition et Alimentation de qualite
- Welfare & conservation of animals
- SME "small and medium-sized enterprise"
- Ageing and intergenerational solidarity
- Climate change, biodiversity and sustainable development / Changement climatique, biodiversité et développement durable (European Bureau for Conservation and Development) (EBCD/IUCN)
- Extreme poverty and human rights
- New media

== List of intergroups in the EP of 2004–2009 (as of 2005) ==
- Fieldsports, fishing and conservation,
- Welfare & conservation of animals
- Family and the Right of the Child
- Baltic-Europe
- Federalist Intergroup for the European Constitution
- Traditional National Minorities, Constitutional Regions and Regional Languages
- Cinema, audiovisual policy and cultural diversity
- Fourth world European committee
- Conservation and sustainable development in the European Parliament
- Tourism
- Disability
- Trade union coordination group
- Anti-racisme & Diversity
- SME "small and medium-sized enterprise"
- Lesbian and gay intergroup
- Press, communication and freedom
- Tibet
- Ciel et espace
- Globalisation intergroup
- Viticulture-tradition-qualite
- Health and consumer
- Urban-logement
- Ageing
- Peace initiatives
