= Inspection générale des finances =

French government agency

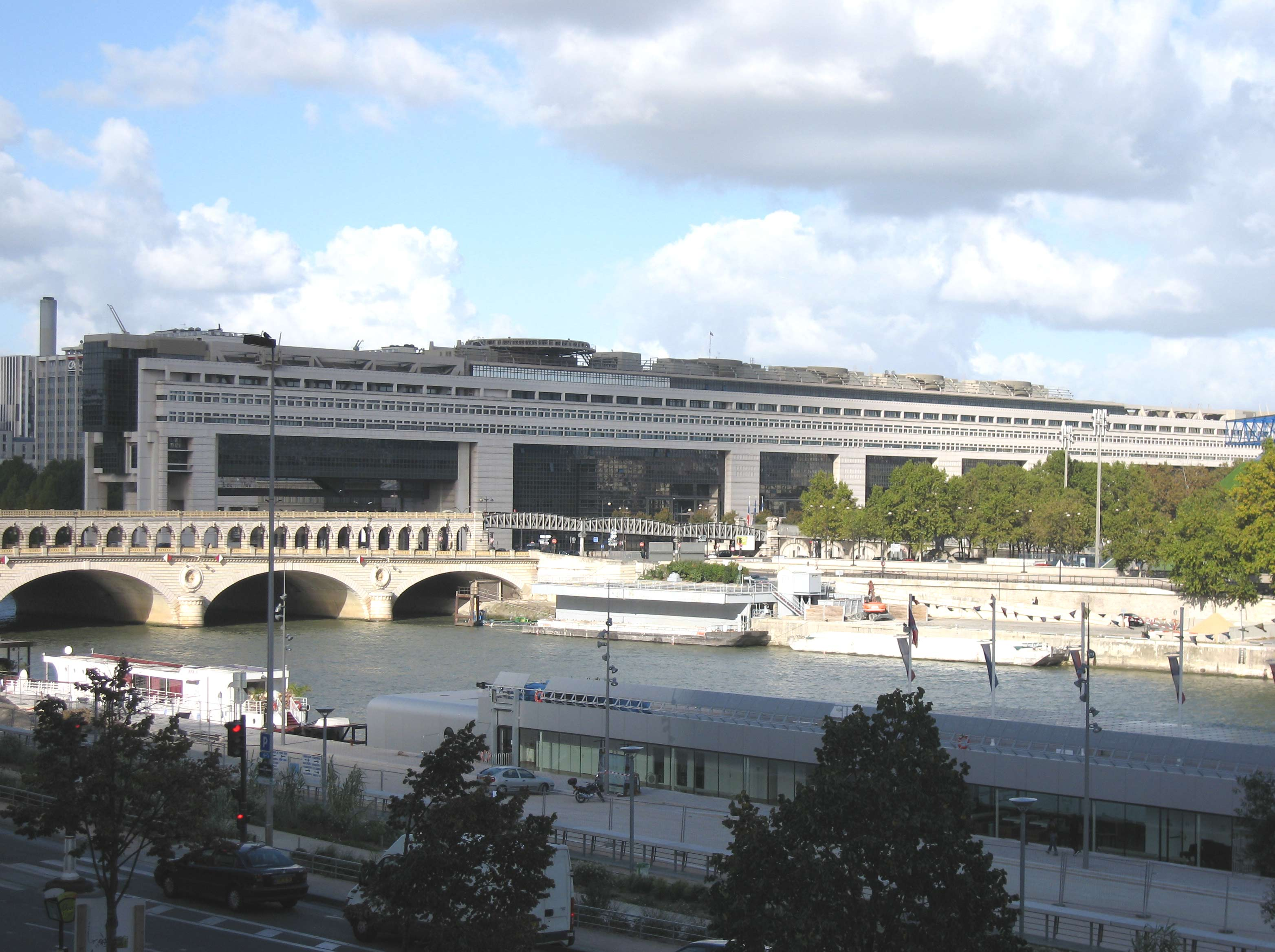
The Inspection générale des finances is located in the Paris neighbourhood of Bercy, at the Ministry of Economy and Finance

The General Inspectorate of Finance or Inspection générale des finances (French pronunciation: [ɛ̃spɛksjɔ̃ ʒeneʁal de finɑ̃s], IGF) is an interdepartmental auditing and supervisory body in France. Its general mission is to provide oversight, audit, analysis, consulting and evaluation services in administrative, economic and financial matters. In the recent years, the IGF has been at the head of the movement of modernisation of the state (in particular through its leading role in the General Review of Public Policies).

It is currently run by Catherine Sueur. It is placed under the joint responsibility of the Ministry of Economy and Finance and Ministry of Public Action and Accounts. Yet, because it is an interdepartmental body, it carries out missions for many ministries.

The General Inspectorate of Finance is not only a state body; it has been one of the Grand Corps of the French State since the 18th century. A small but influential corps, the IGF enjoys a particular prestige: each year it recruits some of the best students graduating from the highly regarded École nationale d'administration, and career opportunities after leaving the IGF are very good in both public and private sectors.

== Assignments ==
Today the General Inspectorate of Finance conducts a variety of assignments upon request both from its supervising ministries and from other ministries, the Prime Minister or the President of the Republic. The IGF has four main missions:

- Historically, its core assignment has been to oversee the decentralized services of the financial ministries. The inspectors of finance are empowered to obtain all documents necessary for purposes of oversight. They are responsible for verifying the quality of procedures and their implementation, the regularity of operations, and also for combating fraud and monitoring the ethical behavior of civil servants. This traditional vocation of the General inspection now accounts for only 9% of its activity.
- Increasingly, the General Inspectorate of Finance is called upon to conduct evaluations of public bodies or public policies (34% of total assignments in 2009) for their ministries; for example, in 2009, it audited the Centre Pompidou, one of the most preeminent museum in France, for the ministry of Culture and the Agence France Développement, the leading international cooperation agency in France, for the ministry of Foreign Affairs.
- Another very important mission has become, in the context of the French General Review of Public Policies (RGPP), to provide consulting services to a variety of public bodies (37% of total assignments in 2009).
- Finally, members of the General Inspectorate of Finance frequently assist members of parliament on a governmental mission or take part in ad hoc committees, such as the Juppe - Rocard committee reviewing the priorities of the National Loan issuance in 2009. These assistance assignments accounted for 15% of the workload in 2009.

Fields of investigation offer a great diversity of subjects as the IGF can be called upon by any ministry, jointly with the Finance or Budget ministers. Members also work with World Bank or International Monetary Fund teams on specific international assignments.

The IGF is often compared to a consulting firm - a consulting firm of the state (its members are civil servants), within the state (it is not an independent body), and for the state (its only client are public administrations). But many differences that regarding the work method of the IGF. The IGF's reports allow three levels of reading: a short summary for ministers (2-5 pages), a synthesis for their staff and for high-level civil servants (20-50 pages), and the complete report for the administration agents (200-800 pages).

== Composition ==
=== Tournée and Inspecteurs Généraux des Finances ===
The Tournée consists of approximately 50 people, with a median age of 34. The group comprises the inspectors of finance (members of the 'corps'), seconded civil servants from other ministries (acting inspectors of finance), and interns. Placed under the supervision of the general inspectors, it performs the bulk of the operational work entailed in carrying out the assignments entrusted to the IGF. Inspectors of finance are mainly recruited after graduation from the École nationale d'administration (the French national school for high-ranking civil servants) - working for the inspection is often one of the top choices of graduates. They spend at least four years working for the IGF before moving to a career outside the IGF. The tournée represents a richly rewarding experience for its members, with a heavy emphasis on teamwork, enabling inspectors of finance to develop their capabilities progressively.

The General Inspectorate of Finance also draws upon talent from a diversity of backgrounds, recruiting via an "external channel", to bring in executive grade personnel with ten years’ public service experience and enable the staff to benefit from a wider range of experience.

There are 40 or so general inspectors of finance, who embody the expertise and experience of the IGF. In some cases they carry out assignments directly, in others they supervise or direct them, in certain cases overseeing and guiding members of the tournée. As consultant general inspectors they provide expertise in a specific area, Finance Ministry Department or another ministry. They bring the IGF’s vision to bear on their particular sphere, contribute to the planning and oversight of missions, supervise the implementation of their recommendations, and ensure knowledge acquired is properly capitalized on and circulated.

=== Current composition ===
There are approximately 260 members of the corps, of which 70 inspectors currently work within the General Inspectorate. The Head of the General Inspectorate of Finance is Marie-Christine Lepetit. Each mission usually gathers between one and four Inspecteurs des Finances under the supervision of one Inspecteur Général des Finances, and can sometimes involve other auditing body (such as the Inspection Générale des Affaires Sociales or the Inspection Générale de l'Administration) or even private consulting firms such as McKinsey & Company.

== After leaving the Inspection ==
Junior inspectors generally complete four years of assignments before moving on to other ministerial departments, public bodies, ministerial cabinets, international organizations or the private sector.

Current prominent figures of the Inspection include:

- President of France, Emmanuel Macron
- European central bank former President, Jean-Claude Trichet
- Director General of the Caisse des dépôts et consignations, Jean-Pierre Jouyet
- Director of the World Trade Organization, Pascal Lamy

Other famous inspectors of finance include:

- François Asselineau
- Michel Bon
- Henri de Castries
- Jacques Chaban-Delmas
- Claude Cheysson
- Valéry Giscard d'Estaing
- Alain Juppé
- Jacques de Larosière
- Jean-Marie Messier
- Xavier Musca
- Jean-Charles Naouri
- Frédéric Oudéa
- Michel Pébereau
- Baudouin Prot
- Michel Rocard
