= Congolese Association Football Federation =

Governing body of association football in the Democratic Republic of the Congo

CAF
- Founded: 1919
- FIFA affiliation: 1964
- CAF affiliation: 1964
- President: Véron Mosengo-Omba
- Website: fecofa.cd

The Congolese Association Football Federation (French: Fédération Congolaise de Football-Association, FECOFA) is the governing body of football in the Democratic Republic of the Congo. It was founded in 1919 and affiliated to the FIFA and CAF in 1964. It organizes the national football league Linafoot and the national team.

The organisation was previously named the Zairian Association Football Federation (French: Fédération Zaïroise de Football Association, FEZAFA) while the country was known as Zaire.

In September 2021, the General Inspectorate of Finance claimed to have foiled an attempt to embezzle public funds. FECOFA was forced to return nearly a million US dollars acquired fraudulently. This sum was initially allocated to the organization of a sporting event.

On 25 April 2023, the FIFA Council decided to appoint a normalization committee to run FECOFA's daily affairs.
