= People for Democracy and Justice =

People for Democracy and Justice (Народ за демократию и справедливость)
- Leader: Mikhail Kasyanov
- Founded: 22 September 2007
- Headquarters: Moscow
- Ideology: Liberalism

People for Democracy and Justice (Russian: Народ за демократию и справедливость [НДС]) is a Russian political party, established in 2007. The party leader is former Russian Prime Minister Mikhail Kasyanov.

Kasyanov's new party was established on 22 September 2007, when he was elected party chairman by 228 votes to 4. Delegates from 57 Russian regions worked on the founding congress.

== See also ==
- Dissenters' March
- The Other Russia (coalition)
- United Civil Front
- Mikhail Kasyanov
- Yabloko
- People's Freedom Party (Russia)
