= Pierre-René Lemas =

French civil servant

Chief of Staff of President of France
- In office 15 May 2012 – 12 April 2014
- President: François Hollande
- Preceded by: Xavier Musca
- Succeeded by: Jean-Pierre Jouyet

Managing director of the Caisse des dépôts et consignations
- In office 21 May 2014 – 8 December 2017
- Preceded by: Jean-Pierre Jouyet
- Succeeded by: Éric Lombard

Personal details
- Born: 23 February 1951 (age 75) Algiers, French Algeria
- Education: Lycée Henri-IV
- Alma mater: Sciences Po, ÉNA

Pierre-René Lemas (born 23 February 1951 in French Algeria) is a French civil servant. He served as the Chief of Staff of the French President, François Hollande from 2012 to 2014. He has served as the Chairman of the Caisse des dépôts et consignations since 2014.

== Early life ==
Pierre-René Lemas was born on February 23, 1951, in Algiers, French Algeria. His parents were Pied-Noirs. His father was a lawyer. His uncle was a journalist for France Inter.

Lemas graduated from Sciences Po and the École nationale d'administration. At the ENA, his coursemates included future President of France François Hollande, but also Ségolène Royal, Dominique de Villepin, Michel Sapin, Jean-Pierre Jouyet and Henri de Castries.

== Career ==
Lemas started his career in the cabinet of the Minister of the Interior, Gaston Defferre, in 1981. In 1985, he worked in the cabinet of Pierre Joxe, focusing on decentralisation. He then served as the Cabinet Secretary to Jean-Michel Boucheron and later Jean-Michel Baylet. In 1988, he worked in Pierre Foxe's cabinet again, and later served as under-secretary to the Délégation interministérielle à l'aménagement du territoire et à l'attractivité régionale.

Lemas served as the Prefect of Corsica from 2003 to 2006. During that time, shots were fired at his office to intimidate him.

Lemas served as the Cabinet Secretary to Senator Jean-Pierre Bel in 2011. He served as the Chief of Staff under President François Hollande from 2012 to 2014. He was replaced by in 2014.

Since 2014, he has served as the Chairman of the Caisse des dépôts et consignations.

== Honors and awards ==
- Commander of the Order of Legion of Honour
- Officer of the Ordre National du Mérite
