= Éric Lombard =

French businessman and politician (born 1958)

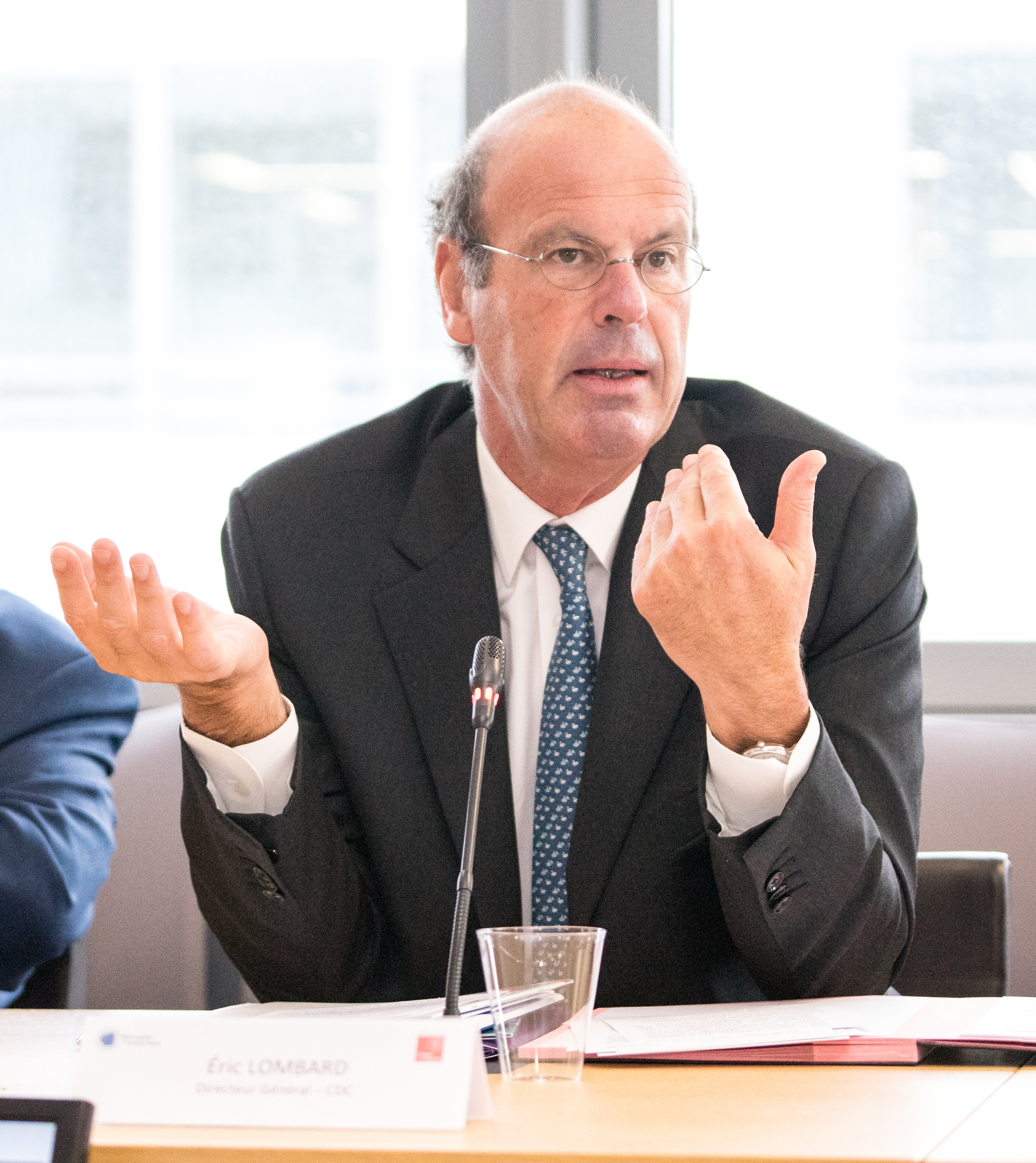
- Lombard in 2018

Minister of Economy, Finance, Industrial and Digital Sovereignty
- In office 23 December 2024 – 5 October 2025
- Prime Minister: François Bayrou
- Preceded by: Antoine Armand
- Succeeded by: Roland Lescure

CEO of Caisse des dépôts et consignations
- In office 8 December 2017 – 23 December 2024
- Preceded by: Pierre-René Lemas
- Succeeded by: Olivier Sichel

Personal details
- Born: Éric Roger Pierre Lombard; 16 May 1958 (age 68) Boulogne-Billancourt, France
- Party: Independent
- Other political affiliations: Socialist Party (formerly)
- Children: 3
- Education: HEC Paris

Éric Roger Pierre Lombard (French pronunciation: [eʁik lɔ̃baʁ]; born 16 May 1958) is a French businessman and politician who served as Minister of Economics and Finance in the government of Prime Minister François Bayrou from 2024 to 2025. From 2017 to 2024, he served as CEO of the Caisse des dépôts et consignations.

== Family and education ==
Éric Lombard is the son of Alfred Lombard, who is a senior executive in Nouvelles Galeries, and Annie Lévy, who is a graphologist and daughter of Pierre Lévy (industrialist), an industrialist who founded the Devanlay group in Troyes.

From 2004 to 2007, he was the CEO of the Art et Biens holding company, managing the family assets. His grandparents, Pierre and Denise Lévy, had collected more than 4,000 works of art, 2,000 of which were bequeathed in 1976 to Troyes, where, in 1982, the Musée d'art moderne de Troyes has opened.

Lombard is married to a visual artist, Françoise Carré, and has three children.

Lombard graduated from HEC Paris in 1981.

== Career ==
In 1989, he became technical advisor to the government's spokesman in the cabinet of Louis Le Pensec, and then the Ministry of the Overseas. Lombard worked as an advisor to Michel Sapin from 1991 to 1993, first at the Ministry of Justice and later at the Ministry of Economics and Finance.

On 16 November 2017, while Pierre-René Lemas had been acting as head of the institution since 22 August, Éric Lombard was proposed by Emmanuel Macron to succeed him as director of the Caisse des dépôts et consignations (CDC), on the basis of a project to make it the financial institution for the common good. His appointment is subject to the approval of the committees of the National Assembly and the Senate. It was confirmed by a vote of the senators on 28 November 2017 and made official by the Council of Ministers on 8 December. Its first success is to bring together within a single structure the consulting and financing expertise of the CDC for regional players under a single brand: the Bank of Territories.

== Other activities ==
- Bpifrance, Member of the Board of Directors (since 2014)
