= Catherine Sueur =

French civil servant (born 1975)

Inspector General of Finances
- Incumbent
- Assumed office 1 May 2022
- President: Emmanuel Macron
- Prime Minister: Jean Castex; Élisabeth Borne; Gabriel Attal; Michel Barnier; François Bayrou
- Preceded by: Marie-Christine Lepetit

Personal details
- Born: 9 December 1975 (age 50)
- Parent: Jean-Pierre Sueur (father)

Catherine Sueur (born 9 December 1975) is a French civil servant who has been serving as inspector general of finances since 2022. From 2019 to 2022, she served as chairwoman of Télérama. From 2011 to 2012, she served as secretary general of Groupe Le Monde. She is the youngest daughter of Jean-Pierre Sueur.
