= Icade =

French real estate investment company

- Type: Public
- Traded as: Euronext: ICAD; CAC Mid 60 Component
- Industry: Real-estate investment company
- Founded: 1860 (SCIC)
- Headquarters: Issy-les-Moulineaux, Paris, France
- Key people: Olivier Wigniolle, CEO
- Revenue: € 1.77 billion (on December 31, 2018)
- Net income: € 300.2 million (2019)
- Total assets: € 11.3 billion (on December 31, 2018)
- Website: Icade (EN)

Previous logo

Icade SA is a multinational real estate investment trust (REIT) that is headquartered in Issy-les-Moulineaux, Paris, France and is a subsidiary of Caisse des dépôts et consignations. The name is an abbreviation of Immobilière Caisse des Dépôts. It invests in various types of properties including health care, offices, business parks, housing and public facilities. It is one of the largest property businesses of France. Icade became the leading commercial real-estate company for offices and business parks in the Île-de-France region, is the largest REIT in healthcare sector of France and a key partner of major French cities. The main shareholders are the parent organization and Crédit Agricole.

== History ==
Société Centrale Immobilière de la Caisse des dépôts (SCIC) was founded in 1954 as a subsidiary of Caisse des dépôts et consignations. The company was a housing construction project owner in France, and was particularly active in the Paris region. During the 1950s and 1960s, it worked with a number of architects to build housing at Sarcelles (France's first large-scale programme, with over 10,000 housing units), Créteil, Mourenx, Épinay-sur-Seine and Gagny. It was not until the 1980s that it started investing in non residential/public properties. By the end of the 1980s it owned around 200,000 rental homes.

SCIC was renamed Icade SA in 2003, and its capital opened up to external shareholders.

The initial public offering of Icade at the Euronext Paris on 12 April 2006 was valued at €2,64 billion.

Icade gained SIIC (REIT outside France) eligibility in 2007 after combining many of its subsidiaries.

Since 2007, Icade has been gradually selling its housing real-estate assets and service activities, to focus on tertiary sector real-estate.

In 2009, the French government considered Icade as a potential "asset in the strategic investment fund that will be key to reviving France's economy". However, this did not ultimately come to pass. In late 2009, Icade acquired Compagnie la Lucette from Morgan Stanley.

On November 13, 2009 Icade sold about 4745 housing units to a group of 25 social housing investors representing another company SNI. That move brought the number of residential units sold or committed for sale in late 2009 to early 2010 up to 29,452. The value of assets divested adds up to about €2 billion.

In the summer of 2010 Icade reached an agreement with MVRDV to develop part of France's first Eco-quarters, a residential complex made up of low energy buildings a first for France.

Icade and Silic merged on 31 December 2013. Since the merger, the new company has divested a number of assets in order to finance new construction projects and acquire more assets outside of France.

On February 17, 2015, Chairman and CEO of Icade, Serge Grzybowski, resigns. Icade SA appoints Jean-Paul Faugere as Chairman of the Board of Icade and Nathalie Palladitcheff as Chief Executive Officer on a temporary basis.

In April 2017 the Icade subsidiary Santé acquired a polyclinic in southwest France and a reception center in Saint-Germé for 52 million euros in total.

In 2017 Icade acquired ANF for 400 million euro. The merger into Icade was completed on 29 June 2018.

In December 2018 Icade sold their main office in Issy-les-Moulineaux for 100 million euro. They continue to occupy the building as a tenant.

In 2018 Icade bought several retirement homes for 100 million euro in Italy. In 2019 it acquired 19 long-term care homes in Germany.

== Key figures ==
| | 31/12/2012 | 31/12/2013 |
|---|---|---|
| Net profit group share (million €) | 53 | 127 |
| EPRA triple net NAV per share (€) | 80.7 | 77.3 |
| Net worth (billion €) | 6.8 | 9.1 |
| Employees | 1,721 | 1,479 |
| Square metres owned by Icade | 2,436,759 | 3,085,000 |
| Clinics owned by Icade | 55 | 59 |

== Assets ==
Icade's assets include offices, shopping centres, business parks, healthcare facilities.

- Offices: In France, Icade handles office properties most of which are located in and around Paris.
- Business parks: Icade's business parks are located in Paris, Saint-Denis, Aubervilliers, Rungis, Nanterre-Seine, Colombes...
- Icade owns two shopping centres: Le Millénaire in Aubervilliers (north-eastern Paris suburbs), opened in April 2011 (50%-owned by Klépierre) and "Le Parc de Fresnes".

The alternative assets portfolio (Icade Santé) : Icade owns 62 establishments as at 30/06/2014.

Many of the buildings in La Défense belong to Icade.
