= Jean-Pierre Sueur =

French politician

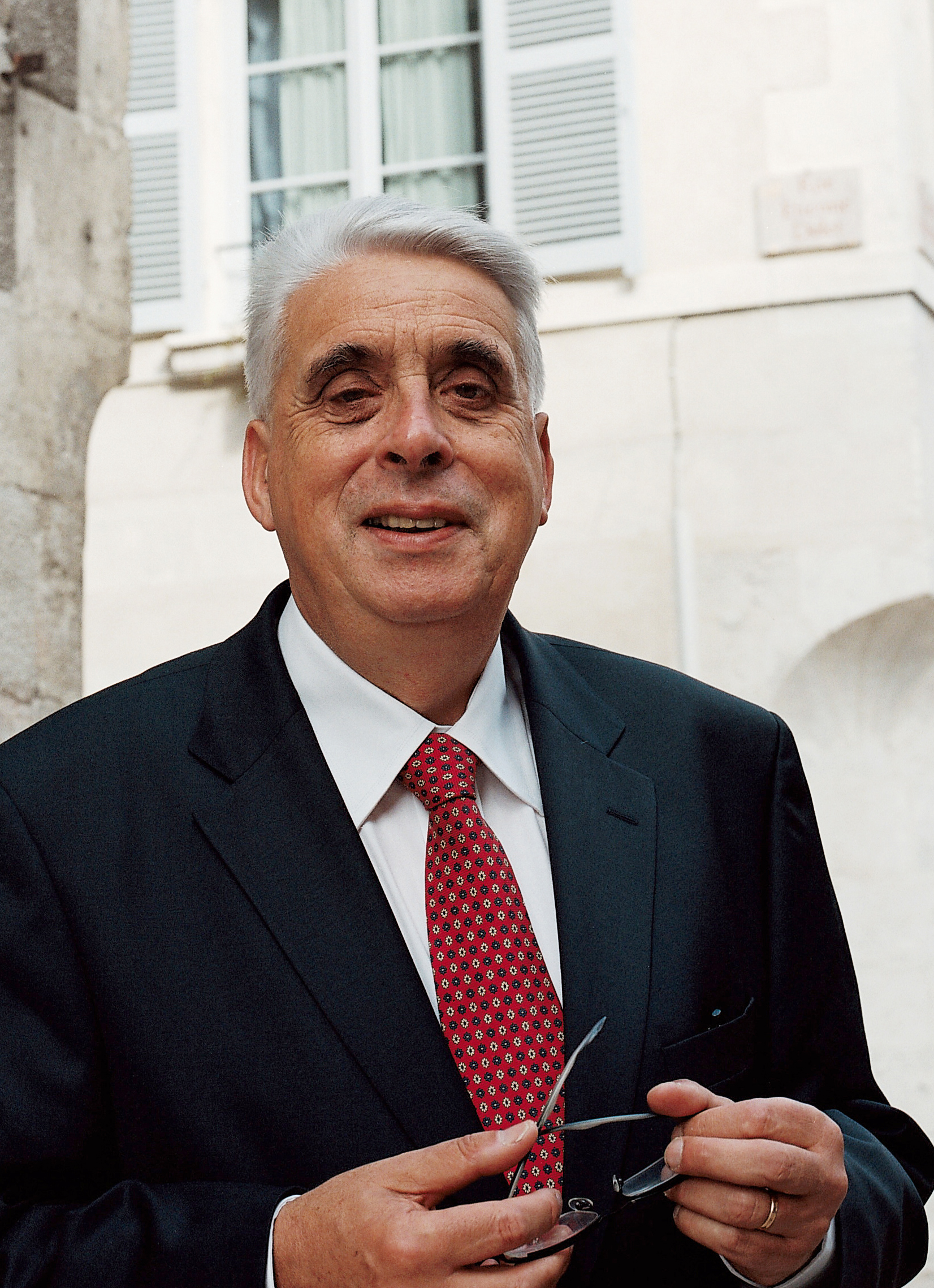
- Jean-Pierre Sueur in 2007

Member of the French Senate for Loiret
- In office 1 October 2001 – 2 October 2023

Mayor of Orléans
- In office 24 March 1989 – 25 March 2001
- Preceded by: Jean-Louis Bernard
- Succeeded by: Serge Grouard

Secretary of State for Territorial collectivity
- In office 15 May 1991 – 29 March 1993
- President: François Mitterrand
- Prime Minister: Édith Cresson; Pierre Bérégovoy
- Preceded by: Jean-Michel Baylet
- Succeeded by: Daniel Hoeffel

Personal details
- Born: 28 February 1947 (age 79) Boulogne-sur-Mer, France
- Party: Socialist Party
- Children: Catherine Sueur
- Education: ENS Saint-Cloud
- Profession: Linguist

Jean-Pierre Sueur (born 28 February 1947) is a French politician of the Socialist Party (PS) who since 2001 has been serving as a member of the Senate of France representing the Loiret department.

He was Quaestor of the Senate from 2020 to 2023.

== Early life ==
Born in Boulogne-sur-Mer, the son of a journalist at Nord Éclair and a seamstress, Sueur was educated at the École normale supérieure in Saint-Cloud, now in Lyon, where he was active in Jeunesse Étudiante Chrétienne and gained a teaching degree in modern literature. From 1973, he taught at the University of Orléans, first as an assistant lecturer, then later as a lecturer in linguistics.

== Career ==
Sueur was a Deputy from the Loiret in the French National Assembly from 1981 to 1991, then was a minister in the governments of Édith Cresson and Pierre Bérégovoy, as Secretary of State for local government. His Assembly mandate ended on his appointment to the government in June 1991, and he was beaten at the Assembly election of March 1993, when he returned to teaching. He stood again at the election in 1997, but lost again. However, Sueur also served two six-year terms as the elected Mayor of the city of Orleans, from 1989 to 2001, and at the 2001 French Senate election he became a Senator.

In the Socialist Party's 2011 primaries, Sueur endorsed Martine Aubry as the party's candidate for the 2012 presidential election.

== Personal life ==
Sueur married Monique Pontier, and they have three daughters, including Catherine Sueur.
