= Caisse des dépôts et consignations =

French public-sector financial institution

Coordinates: 48°51′33″N 2°19′42″E

Caisse des Dépôts et Consignations

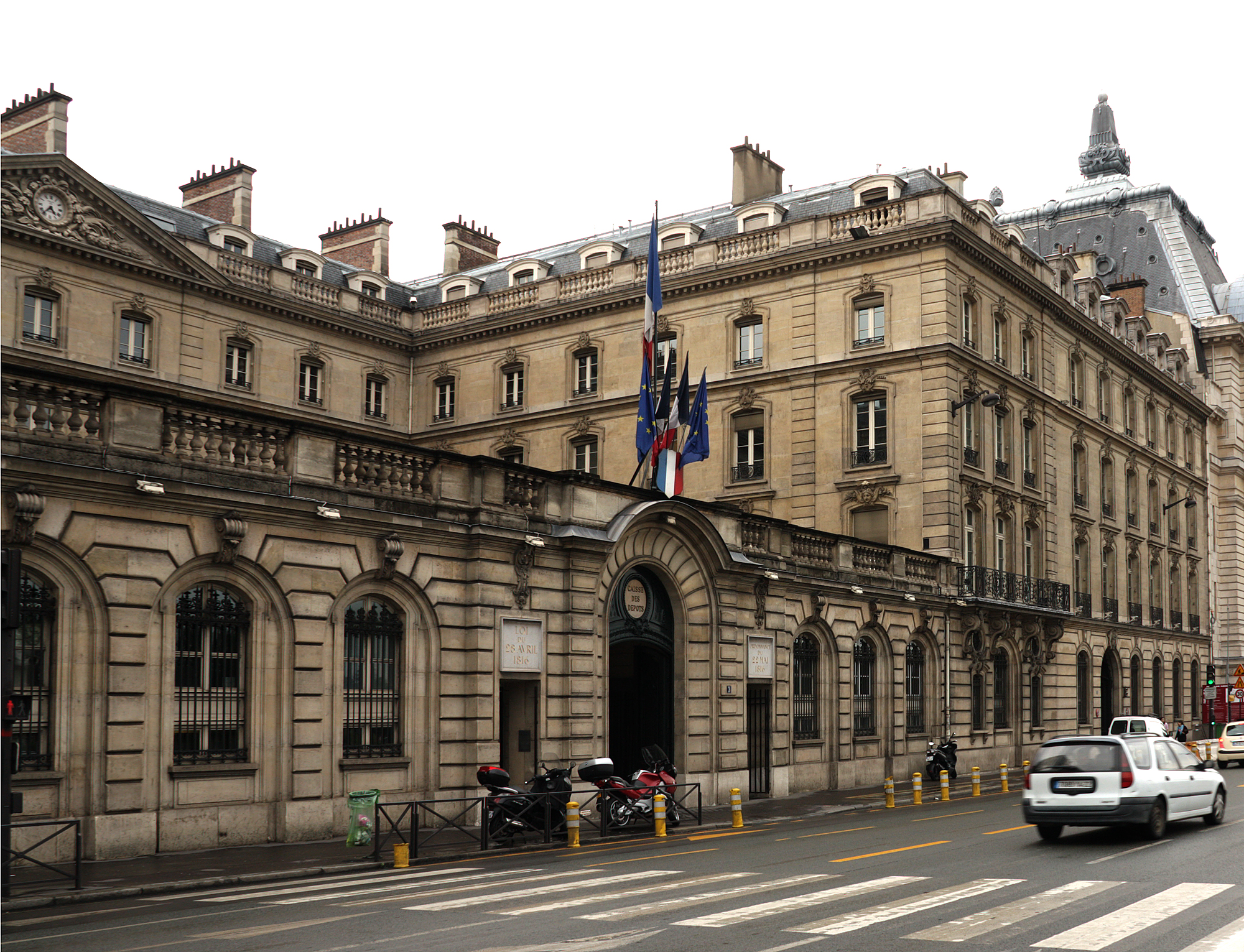
- Headquarters in Paris
- Industry: Institutional investor
- Founded: 1816; 210 years ago
- Headquarters: Paris, France
- Key people: Jean-René Cazeneuve, Chairman since 2024; Olivier Sichel, CEO since 2024
- Net income: ▼€4.2 billion (2022)
- AUM: ▲€244 billion (2022) US$275.4 billion
- Total assets: ▲€1.32 trillion (2022)
- Total equity: ▼€59 billion (2022)
- Number of employees: 127,005 (2013)
- Website: caissedesdepots.fr

The Caisse des dépôts et consignations (French pronunciation: [kɛs de depo e kɔ̃siɲasjɔ̃]; CDC; 'Deposits and Consignments Fund') is an idiosyncratic French public financial institution created in 1816, often referred to as the investment arm of the French State. It is defined in the French Monetary and Financial Code as a "public group serving the public interest" and a "long-term investor". Its governance framework places it under the control of the Parliament.

CDC has sprawling assets, including (as of early 2024) a 66-percent stake in La Poste, France's post office; 34 percent of Transdev, a public transportation operator; 40 percent of Compagnie des Alpes, a ski resort and theme park operator; 39 percent of Icade, a property company; 39 percent of GRTgaz, France's main gas pipeline system; 34 percent of Egis, an engineering consultancy; 33 percent of Compagnie Nationale du Rhône, a hydroelectricity generator; 30 percent of RTE, France's transmission system operator; 20 percent of Suez, a major water and waste management company; and a vast portfolio of property assets including Théâtre des Champs-Élysées, a historic entertainment venue in Paris. CDC further has significant banking operations including fully owned SFIL, majority-owned La Banque Postale (through La Poste), and half-owned Bpifrance, even though it is not itself a credit institution under EU law and therefore not within the scope of European Banking Supervision. Its total consolidated balance sheet, not including pension funds under CDC management, reached 1.3 trillion euros at end-2021.

== History ==
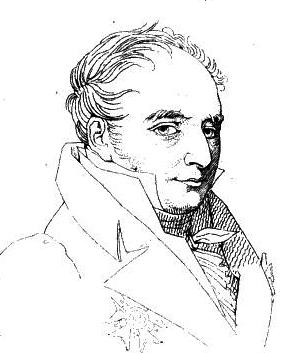
Louis-Emmanuel Corvetto, by Ferdinando Quaglia

=== 19th century ===
The Caisse des Dépôts et Consignations succeeded the Caisse de garantie et d'amortissement, created by Napoleon and liquidated in 1816 following his demise. It was the brainchild of Louis-Emmanuel Corvetto, Finance Minister under King Louis XVIII, in a context of government debt distress in the aftermath of the Hundred Days turmoil of 1815 and of Louis XVIII's distrust of the Bank of France given its Napoleonic baggage. Article 110 of its founding law of 28 April 1816 reads: "Deposits, consignments and services relating to the Legion of Honour, to the channel company and to pension funds [...] will be administered by a special body under the name Caisse des Dépôts et Consignations." Three executive orders of 3 July 1816 further defined the major areas of activity of the new entity: consignments (French: consignations), namely safekeeping funds or assets that are subject to ongoing legal disputes; voluntary deposits from individuals or public bodies and funds from the legal professions; and pension funds. Additional activities included the management of accounts for the Legion of Honour, and financial services for the French army. By law, the CDC also was directed to use its funds mainly to purchase public "annuities" and therefore contribute to the funding of the French state.

Under Prime Minister Joseph de Villèle, the French government started to leverage the CDC to finance new infrastructure, inaugurating its role as France's development bank. The CDC granted its first local infrastructure loan for the development of the Port of Dunkirk in 1822, and at the same time acquired securities issued by the Compagnie des quatre canaux, a canal investment venture. In 1825, it was tasked with the indemnification of former colonists in Saint-Domingue under the settlement that gave rise to the Haiti Independence Debt.

From 1837, the French parliament decided that the funds collected by the local caisses d'épargne (French savings banks)' savings accounts should be centralised and invested by the CDC. This provision was extended to the postal passbook (later Livret A) upon the creation of the Caisse nationale d'épargne in 1881.

In 1850, the CDC started acquiring stakes in newly created railways companies. That same year, in addition to its mandate to manage the civil service pension fund held since 1816, the CDC was tasked with managing France's first old-age pension fund (French: Caisse des retraites pour la vieillesse, CRV), which extended the personal protection scope to a much broader range of beneficiaries. The first two public life insurance institutions set up in France, the National Insurance Fund in the event of Death (French: Caisse nationale d'assurances en cas de décès, CNAD) and National Insurance Fund in the event of Accidents (French: Caisse nationale d'assurances en cas d'accidents, CNAA), were also managed by the CDC from their creation in 1868.

Since 1890, under a mandate from the French state, the CDC has been receiving funds deposited by individuals at notaries, notably during inheritance or property transactions. This line of operations has subsequently widened to include funds from company administrators and legal representatives, court clerks, and bailiffs. The CDC was further entrusted with the management of new mandates like the Social Cohesion Fund (French: Fonds de cohésion sociale, FCS) which guarantees loans to individuals and legal entities and grants loans to job-seekers or welfare recipients who create their own company.

=== 20th century ===
In 1905, the CDC granted its first loans to social housing out of its own funds. In 1908 the French state entrusted it with the management of its housing loans and the French law of 26 February 1921 authorised loans on savings funds for low-cost housing (HBM), prefiguring the first social housing (French: Habitations à Loyer Modéré, HLM). The French law of 1928, known as "Loi Loucheur", did not change this mission, rather it strengthened the CDC's role through a large scale programme of 200,000 low-cost homes and 80,000 moderate-rent homes.

By the end of 1930, CDC loans to local authorities allowed for the creation of a national telephone network. The next year, the 1931 Finance Act authorised the CDC to invest inflows to the savings funds in corporate shares and bonds.

Under the Vichy regime, the CDC received funds confiscated from the French Jewish community. These funds were later only partially restored to their legitimate owners after France's liberation.

In the afterwar period, the CDC became a main catalyst of France's reconstruction, often in partnership with the General Planning Commission. The CDC's role of funding social housing was also strengthened in that period by the implementation of different regulated saving centralisation systems. Several subsidiaries were founded in the 1950s: Société Centrale Immobilière de la CDC (SCIC), a real-estate company in 1954 (rebranded Icade in 2003); Société Centrale pour l'Équipement du Territoire (SCET) in 1955, a service provider for local infrastructure companies (French: Sociétés d'économie mixte, SEM); Villages Vacances Familles in 1958, specialising in social and family tourism.

In 1959, the CNAD and CNAA merged to form the Caisse Nationale de Prévoyance (CNP), later rebranded CNP Assurances and publicly listed in 1998. CNP Assurances was in 2013 the number one personal insurance company in France.

Since 1960, the CDC has been decentralised into 25 regional management units (French: délégations régionales, later directions régionales), one for each French region, which implement the group's strategy in their respective territorial remit. In 1963, the CDC created the Société Forestière, a forestry company.

In 1966, the CDC created the Local Authority Infrastructure Support Bank (French: Caisse d'aide à l'équipement des collectivités locales, CAECL), which in 1987 became the Crédit Local de France (CLF), itself merged in 1996 with Crédit Communal de Belgique to form Dexia.

In 1970, the CDC created another subsidiary, Scetauroute, for the development of motorway infrastructure. The development of services has since widened to the public transport sector for passengers with Transdev in 1990, to engineering infrastructure with Egis in 1998 (via the merger of Scetauroute and other engineering subsidiaries) and lastly to the business of ski and leisure park operation with the Compagnie des Alpes in 1989.

From 1994, the CDC has invested in SMEs with the SME Innovation programme, to strengthen their equity, encourage innovation and support the risk capital market. CDC Entreprises succeeded CDC PME in 1998.

In 1999, the CDC formed a new subsidiary, CDC IXIS, that took over its commercial banking activities, in order to mitigate competitive distortions associated with its role in the financial sector.

=== 21st century ===
In 2000, the CDC was entrusted with the creation of the cyberbase programme, the aim of which was to deploy digital public spaces over the entire French territory to encourage the development of Internet use and new information technology. Since 2003, it has been investing in the spread of Digital Work Spaces (ENT) which offers digital services to educational institutions (schools, secondary schools and universities).

Also in 2000, the CDC initiated a program of climate research that developed into various projects such as CDC Climat and Novethic. In 2005, it was a sponsor of the European Carbon Fund and of France's national register of greenhouse gas emission quotas. In 2008, it sponsored a "compensation fund for biodiversity" via its specialised subsidiary CDC Biodiversité.

In 2001, the CDC formed Eulia, a joint venture with the Caisse Nationale des Caisses d'Épargne (CNCE), to which it contributed CDC IXIS. In 2004 the CNCE took full control of Eulia and therefore of Ixis, and in 2006 had it merged with Natexis Banques Populaires to form Natixis, which subsequently evolved into a fully owned subsidiary of Groupe BPCE.

In 2004, Caisse des Dépôts acquired all the equity of the Société Nationale Immobilière (SNI), the number one social landlord in France, which it subsequently rebranded as CDC Habitat. Also in 2004, the CDC participated in Qualium Investissement, aimed to support venture capital activity. It was strengthened in 2007 by the creation of the Strategic Investment Fund (French: Fonds Stratégique d'Investissement, FSI). As a consequence of the 2008 financial crisis, the CDC incurred a loss in 2008 for the first time in its history.

In 2013, CDC Entreprises and the FSI merged to form Bpifrance, half-owned by the CDC. That same year, the CDC acquired 20 percent of the newly formed SFIL.

Since 2014, the CDC has been developing its role as trustee and lender on behalf of third parties inherited from its original consignations business, as well as managing the Personal Training Account (French: Compte personnel de formation, CPF), dormant accounts and the Programme of investments for the future (French: Programme d'Investissements d'Avenir, PIA).

In January 2016, following France's 2015 reform of regions, the number of regional CDC units has been reduced to 13.

In 2018, the CDC reorganized its activities supporting France's local governments as a new unit branded the Banque des territoires, which is not however a bank in a legal sense. In 2020, a broad restructuring of state-owned assets led to the CDC becoming sole owner of SFIL, with only one residual share kept by the French state, and 66-percent owner of La Poste, with the French state owning the remaining 34 percent. As part of that same restructuring, CNP Assurances became majority-owned by La Banque Postale (LBP), itself fully owned by La Poste. In 2021-2022, LBP acquired all remaining shares to become the sole owner of CNP, which was correspondingly delisted.

== French operations ==
As set out within the French Monetary and Financial Code, the Caisse des dépôts et consignations carries out missions of public interest in support of the public policies implemented by the State and local government bodies. It contributes to the development of enterprises in line with its own proprietorial interests, and may also exercise competitive activities. It ensures, on behalf of the State and local authorities, missions of general interest:

- Management of the regulated savings funds (Livret A, LDD, etc.) and financing of social housing through these funds;
- Management of pension plans (47 institutions in management, more than 75,000 employers, a total management of a retiree in five);
- Management of public authority (European funds, register of greenhouse gases);
- Banking management of the French public justice system (notaries, receivers, judicial representatives...) and of Social Security (including consignment);
- Key stakeholder and provider of funding for the urban policy;
- Supporting universities in their projects and providing funding for their autonomy;
- Financing the development of TPE (very small businesses, microcredit) and small and medium enterprises (SMEs) through BpiFrance;
- Promoting research (I4CE, Novethic) and financing sustainable development;
- Developing territories alongside local authorities (13 regional offices in the country and overseas);
- Long-term institutional investor.

== Other European operations ==
Independently of the presence of the operational subsidiaries, the Caisse des Dépôts group ensures an institutional presence internationally. Caisse des Dépôts develops bilateral and multilateral relations with partner institutions which allow for the promotion of long-term investment and the development of investment projects in France and abroad, particularly in projects relating to the energy transition.

The European level takes on a crucial importance for the Caisse des Dépôts group taking into account the drive and influence of the European Union on investments and public interventions in France.

Since the 2008 financial crisis, Caisse des Dépôts, along with other public financial institutions in the European Union, has undertaken the promotion of the specific model of asset management with a long term horizon. In 2009, Caisse des Dépots, Cassa Depositi e Prestiti, the European Investment Bank and Kreditanstalt für Wiederaufbau (KfW) created the Long Term Investors Club (LTIC) with the aim of bringing together worldwide institutions to emphasis common identity as long-term investors, to encourage cooperation and to foster appropriate conditions for long-term investments. Today the Long-Term investors Club gathers 18 financial institutions and institutional investors mainly from G20 countries, representing a combined balance sheet total of USD 5.4 trillion. Also in 2011, Caisse des Dépôts and other institutional investors held a national summit on long-term investment in France. From the summit a Report was drafted and it gained momentum in the financial establishment. This led to the creation of the "task force of the Paris stock exchange on long term investment" under the guidance of former financial director of AXA insurance company Gerard de la Martiniere. Still active today, the task force is dedicated to the promotion of the model of long term investment to the institutions of the European Union on a regulatory, fiscal, accounting and prudential level. After the publication of the European Commission Green Paper on the long-term financing of the economy, in July 2013, Caisse des Dépôts, together with the European members of the Long Term investors Club, cofounded the European Long Term investors Association. This association allows for the undertaking of joint actions in order to highlight this specific investor model with public stakeholders and the European Union.The Eltia gathers 27 European long-term financial institutions. With a combined balance sheet of €2.45 trillion, ELTIA's goal is to promote long-term investment in alignment with the objectives and initiatives developed by the European Union. Caisse des Dépôts also contributes to the work of the European Parliament Intergroup on long term investment and reindustrialisation which was implemented at the start of the election of the European Parliament in 2014.

- Marguerite Fund

Caisse des Dépôts is one of the investors brought together in the Marguerite Fund which combines the contributions from public institutions (CDC, KfW, CdP, etc.) to create investments in Europe. The first achievements were put into operation from 2014 and the investment programme will be completed in 2016.

- Participation to the "Investment Plan for Europe" launched by the Commission Juncker (2014–2019)

As a National Promotional Institution (NPI) from the European Union, Caisse des Dépôts is in partnership with the European Investment Bank and the European Commission in the implementation of the European Commission Investment Plan for Europe. As such Caisse des Dépôts has committed to provide €8 billion in the form of loans, equity and guarantees to projects under financing from the European Fond for Strategic Investment (EFSI), enhancing the leverage potential of the Fund. Also Caisse des Dépôts contributes to the European Investment Advisory Hub (EIAH) and delivers an advisory services model along the EIB.

== Overseas operations ==
Caisse des Dépôts maintains bilateral and multi-lateral relationships. These partnerships, historically deployed with its counterparts in Africa and the Maghreb, have also developed with institutions and public banks in China and Brazil. In 2011, with the Moroccan CDG, Caisse des Dépôts organized the Caisse des Dépôts Global Forum which promotes long-term investment and public funding models for economic and social development. The Forum organises a biannual meeting, the last session of which was held in Tunis in April 2015.

- Inframed Fund

Caisse des Dépôts is an investor in the Inframed fund launched in 2010 with other public institutions from the Mediterranean region. Inframed is targeting €385mn of investments into infrastructure development projects.

== Governance ==
=== Supervisory Board ===
The CDC Group's principal governing bodies are Commission de surveillance (the Supervisory Board) and Chief Executive Officer (directeur général), as described below.

The 1816's law conferred to CDC a special status designed to guarantee its complete independence by placing it "under the supervision and guarantee of the legislative authorities" through the Supervisory Board (Commission de surveillance) with the aim of protecting CDC against any arbitrary action by the executive powers emanating from the state. Parliament, representing the nation, exercises control over CDC's activities and ensures its autonomy. It exercises this dual mission through the Supervisory Board which acts as guarantor of CDC's independence, provides general oversight and control and carries out the missions entrusted to it by law. Once a year, the Supervisory Board sends its annual report to Parliament. The law on the Modernization of the Economy of 4 August 2008 (PACTE) enlarged and strengthened the role of the Supervisory Board and consolidated parliamentary oversight of the CDC Group. This unique status of the group confers a guarantee of independence to CDC unlike any other entity. Equally, the "PACTE" law (Action Plan for Business Growth and Transformation) of 22 May 2019 expanded the Commission de surveillance's mission and responsibilities particularly regarding strategic issues, the adoption CDC's budget and investment decisions.

The missions of the Supervisory Board are set out by the French Monetary and Financial Code in its Articles L. 518-7 to L. 518-9 and were amended in 2018 by the "PACTE" law (Action Plan for Business Growth and Transformation). Pursuant to Article L. 518-7, the Supervisory Board provides for a permanent control over the CDC's management ensured by its chief executive officer. The Supervisory Board can delegate some of its powers to the Chief Executive Officer, who shall report on the decisions he has taken pursuant to this delegation. The Supervisory Board must have sufficient resources to ensure the proper exercise of its functions and of its members' mandates. The Supervisory Board deliberates at least four times a year concerning: (i) the strategic positioning of the public establishment (ie CDC) and of its subsidiaries including the medium-term plan; (ii) the implementation of the public interest functions of CDC; and (iii) the determination of the investment strategy of the public establishment and of its subsidiaries. Article L. 518-7 also provides that the Supervisory Board adopts the CDC budget upon the Chief Executive Officer proposal, such budget being subject to the Minister of Finance's approval. The Commission de surveillance also determines the prudential model and approves the debt instrument issuance program together with the maximum annual volume of the said debt instruments.

The SC approves the guidelines of the internal control system proposed by the chief executive officer. It also deliberates on the CDC's policies relating to professional equality between men and women policies and equal pay. Pursuant to Article L. 518-9, the Supervisory Board carries out every control and verification it requires to perform its functions and obtains any documents it believes necessary. The Supervisory Board can send to the Chief Executive Officer comments and opinions and can decide whether to publish them. A plenary meeting of the Supervisory Board is held at least once a month and the scrutiny and oversight are also currently provided by the following Board committees: Audit and Risks Committee created in 2003; Savings Fund Committee created in 2003; Investment Committee created in 2008; Nominations and Wages Committee created in 2008; the Strategic Committee created in 2018; and CSR (Corporate Social Responsibility) and Ethic Committee created in 2022.

Under the provisions of the PACTE law:

- Article L. 518-4 of the French Monetary and Financial Code provides that the Supervisory Board is composed of 16 members with a three-years term of office consisting of: two members of the National Assembly (Assemblée nationale) commission responsible for finance (at least one of whom must belong to a group which has stated that it does not support the Government); one member of the National Assembly (Assemblée nationale) commission responsible for economic affairs; one member of the Senate (Sénat) commission responsible for economic affairs; one member of the Senate commission responsible for finance; the director general of the Treasury of the Ministry responsible for the Economy who may be represented; and five members designated on account of their expertise in finance, accounting or economics 'spheres, or in that of management (three designated by the President of the National Assembly after opinion of the Finance Committee of the National Assembly and two designated by the President of the Senate after opinion of the Finance Committee of the Senate); three members appointed by decree chosen on account of their expertise in finance, accounting, economics or legal spheres or in that of management; and two members representing employees of the CDC and its subsidiaries.
- CDC is subject to the accounting rules governing commercial matters. Therefore, the provisions relating to the Caissier Général (as provided by the Article L. 518-13 of the French Monetary and Financial Code) and the provisions relating to the control by the Cour des comptes (France's supreme audit institution) have been repealed.
- Statutory auditors are invited to attend all Supervisory Board meetings discussing the annual or interim financial statements (Article L. 518-15 of the French Monetary and Financial Code).
- The French Prudential Control Authority oversees prudential controls over CDC (Article L. 518-15-2 of the French Monetary and Financial Code).
- The fraction of net income of CDC's activities paid every year to the State will be fixed by decree, after the Supervisory Board has delivered its opinion and provided that its payment cannot affect either the CDC solvency or compliance with prudential rules (Article L. 518-16 of the French Monetary and Financial Code).

The chairman and members of the Commission de surveillance as of [today] are:

- Alexandre Holroyd, chairman - member of the French National Assembly for the third electoral district des Français établis hors de France
- Anne-Laurence Petel, member of the French National Assembly for Bouches-du-Rhône 14th electoral district
- Marc Le Fur, member of the French National Assembly for the Côtes-d'Armor 3rd electoral district
- Emmanuelle Auriol, qualified person appointed by the president of the National Assembly
- Denis Duverne, qualified person appointed by the president of the National Assembly
- Florence Parly, qualified person, appointed by the president of the National Assembly
- Arnaud Bazin, senator of Val d'Oise
- Viviane Artigalas, senator of Hautes-Pyrénées
- Jean-Yves Perrot, qualified person appointed by the president of the Senate
- Evelyne Ratte, qualified person appointed by the president of the Senate
- Jean-Marc Janaillac, qualified person on behalf of the state
- Marie-Claire Capobianco, qualified person on behalf of the state
- Claude Karpman Nahon, qualified person on behalf of the state
- Gabriel Cumenge, assistant director of Trésor executive management, representative of the director general of the Treasury
- Beatrice De Ketelaere, staff representative of the Caisse des Dépôts
- Pierre Fourcail, staff representative of the Caisse des dépôts

In line with its lifelong principle of parliamentary oversight, chairs of the CDC have been either members of the Chamber of Peers or the Senate, or Deputies of the Chamber of Deputies or National Assembly:

- Peer Jacques-Pierre Orillard de Villemanzy, 1816-1819 and 1826-1828
- Peer Nicolas François, Count Mollien, 1819-1826 and 1831-1837
- Peer Jean-Louis Tourteau d'Orvilliers, 1828-1831
- Peer Antoine Roy, 1837-1847
- Peer Gaston d'Audiffret, 1847-1848
- Deputy Michel Goudchaux, 1848-1849
- Deputy Pierre-Antoine Berryer, 1849-1851
- Senator Antoine Maurice Apollinaire d'Argout, 1852-1857
- Senator Théobald de Lacrosse, 1857-1865
- Senator Gustave Rouland, 1865-1871
- Deputy Louis Buffet, 1871-1876
- Senator Charles Duclerc, 1876-1888
- Senator Eugène Goüin, 1888-1909
- Senator Maurice Rouvier, 1909-1911
- Senator Victor Lourties, 1911-1920
- Senator Jean-Baptiste Bienvenu-Martin, 1920-1942
- Senator Louis Linÿer, 1943-1944
- Deputy Joseph Denais, 1945-1955
- Deputy Pierre Courant, 1956-1962
- Deputy Aimé Paquet, 1962-1971
- Deputy Christian Bonnet, 1971-1972
- Deputy Michel Poniatowski, 1972-1973
- Deputy Robert Bisson, 1973-1981
- Deputy Dominique Taddei, 1981-1985
- Deputy Philippe Sanmarco, 1985-1986
- Deputy Jean-Pierre Soisson, 1986-1988
- Deputy Christian Pierret, 1988-1993
- Deputy Jean-Pierre Delalande, 1993-1997
- Deputy Jean-Pierre Balligand, 1997-2002
- Deputy Philippe Auberger, 2002-2006
- Deputy Pierre Hériaud, 2006-2007
- Deputy Michel Bouvard, 2007-2012
- Deputy Henri Emmanuelli, 2012-2017
- Deputy Marc Goua, 2017
- Deputy Gilles Le Gendre, 2017-2018
- Deputy Sophie Errante, 2018-2022
- Deputy Alexandre Holroyd, since 2022

=== Chief Executive Officer ===
The chief executive officer (French: directeur général) is responsible for administering the institution's funds and assets and is assisted both by Caisse des Dépôts' Management Committee and by the Group Management Committee, both of which are chaired by the CEO. The CEO is appointed for a period of five years by decree of the President of the French Republic, and takes an oath of office before the Supervisory Committee.

The successive CEOs of the CDC have been:

- Antoine-Pierre Dutramblay, 1816-1817
- Jules-Paul Pasquier, 1818-1848
- Gilbert-Hercule Guillemot, 1848-1873
- Adrien Dufrayer, 1873-1888
- Henri Labeyrie, 1888-1895
- Gustave Vuarnier, 1895-1898
- Émile Boutin, 1898-1900
- Albert Delatour, 1900-1925
- Jean Tannery, 1925-1934
- Henri Deroy, 1935-1945
- Jean Watteau, 1945-1952
- François Bloch-Lainé, 1952-1967
- Maurice Pérouse, 1967-1982
- Robert Lion, 1982-1992
- Philippe Lagayette, 1992-1997
- Daniel Lebègue, 1997-2002
- Francis Mayer, 2002-2006
- Augustin de Romanet de Beaune, 2007-2012
- Jean-Pierre Jouyet, 2012-2014
- Pierre-René Lemas, 2014-2017
- Éric Lombard, since 2017

== See also ==
- List of national development banks
- List of banks in France
