= Paris Club =

International organization

Paris Club Club de Paris
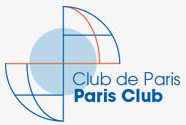
- Emblem

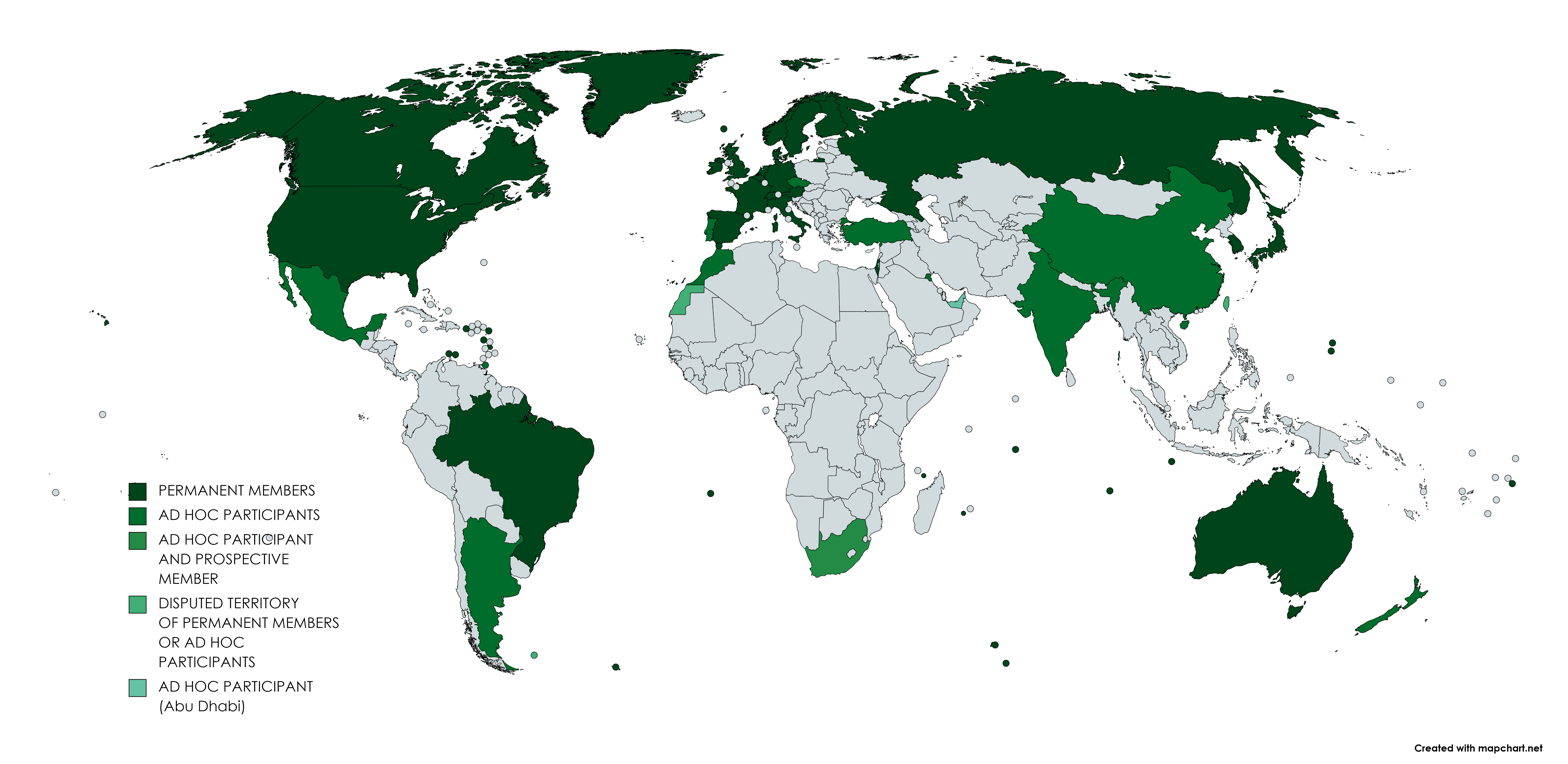
- Secretariat: Paris, France
- Languages: English, French
- Membership: 22 member states 13 ad hoc member states 9 observers

Leaders
  - Chairperson: Bertrand Dumont
  - Co-Chairperson: William Roos
  - Vice-Chairperson: Shanti Bobin
  - Secretary General: Philippe Guyonnet-Dupérat
- Establishment: 1956; 70 years ago
- Website clubdeparis.org

Paris Club (French: Club de Paris) is a group of major creditor countries aiming to provide a sustainable way to tackle debt problems in debtor countries. Its creation, which is the first informal meeting, dates back to 1956, when Argentina agreed to hold a meeting with its public creditors.

The Paris Club treats public claims (that is to say, those due by governments of debtor countries and by the private sector), guaranteed by the public sector to Paris Club members. A similar process used to occur for public debt held by private creditors in the London Club, which was organized in 1970 on the model of the Paris Club as an informal group of commercial banks renegotiating together the debt they hold on sovereign debtors (countries to which they extended loans) which were no longer able to repay.

Creditor countries meet c. ten times a year for Tour d'Horizon and negotiating sessions. To facilitate Paris Club operations, the French Treasury provides a small secretariat, and the Director general of the French Treasury acts as chairman.

Paris club has reached 478 agreements with 102 debtor countries to date for approximately USD 600 bn rescheduled.

== Members ==
There are currently 22 Permanent Members of the Paris Club:

- Australia
- Austria
- Belgium
- Brazil
- Canada
- Denmark
- Finland
- France
- Germany
- Ireland
- Israel
- Italy
- Japan
- Netherlands
- Norway
- Russia
- South Korea
- Spain
- Sweden
- Switzerland
- United Kingdom
- United States

Creditor delegations are generally led by a senior delegate from the Ministry of Finance.

=== Ad hoc participants ===
Other official creditors can also participate in negotiation sessions or in monthly "Tours d'Horizon" discussions, subject to the agreement of permanent members and of the debtor country. When participating in Paris Club discussions, invited creditors act in good faith and abide by the practices described below. The following creditors have participated in some Paris Club agreements or Tours d'Horizon in an ad hoc manner:

- Argentina
- China
- Czech Republic
- India
- Kuwait
- Mexico
- Morocco
- New Zealand
- Portugal
- Saudi Arabia
- Trinidad and Tobago
- Turkey
- United Arab Emirates

=== Observers ===
Observers are invited to attend the negotiating sessions of the Paris Club but they cannot participate in the negotiation itself, nor sign the agreement that formalizes the result of negotiation.

There are three categories of observers:

1. Representatives of international institutions:
  - International Monetary Fund (IMF)
  - World Bank
  - Organisation for Economic Co-operation and Development (OECD)
  - United Nations Conference on Trade and Development (UNCTAD)
  - European Commission
  - African Development Bank
  - Asian Development Bank
  - European Bank for Reconstruction and Development (EBRD)
  - Inter-American Development Bank (IADB)
1. Representatives of permanent members of the Paris Club, which have no claims concerned by the debt treatment, for example creditors whose claims are covered by the de minimis provision or that are not creditors of the debtor country concerned, but nevertheless want to attend the negotiation meeting;
2. Representatives of non Paris Club countries, which have claims on the debtor country concerned but are not in a position to sign the Paris Club agreement as ad hoc participants, provided that permanent members and the debtor country agree on their attendance.

== Organisation ==
=== The Secretariat ===
The Secretariat was established to prepare more effective negotiating sessions. The Secretariat is composed of a dozen people from the French Directorate General of the Treasury, it is led by a Secretary general.

The Secretariat's role is primarily to safeguard the common interests of creditor countries participating in the Club, and to facilitate the reaching of a consensus between them at each level of the discussions. To achieve this, the Secretariat prepares negotiating sessions according to a specific method.

In the early stages of discussions, the Secretariat analyses the debtor country's payment capacity and provides creditors with a first proposal for a treatment. This proposal is discussed by the creditors (whose positions during the negotiation are transcribed in the so-called "magic table"). The Secretariat is also responsible for drafting the minutes of negotiation.

The Secretariat also helps to ensure compliance with the various covenants contained in the minutes and maintains external relations with third States creditors and commercial banks, in particular to ensure the greatest possible respect of comparability clause treatment.

Under the common framework for debt treatment, the secretariat acts under the guidance of the co-chairs (Paris Club and G20 co-chairs) in the same technical work.

=== The Chair ===
Since 1956, the Presidency of the Paris Club is ensured by the French Treasury.

The Chairperson of the Paris Club is Bertrand Dumont, Director-General of the Treasury. Co-Chairman is William Roos, Assistant Secretary for Multilateral Affairs, Trade and Development Policies Department. Vice-Chair is Shanti Bobin, his Deputy in charge of Multilateral Financial Affairs and Development Division. One of these three must chair every meeting of the Paris Club.

In particular, during negotiation sessions, the Chairman of the Paris Club plays the role of intermediary between creditors, who elaborate debt treatment proposals, and the representative of the debtor country, usually the Minister of Finance. He is responsible for submitting to the debtor's delegation terms agreed upon by creditors. The Secretary general assists him in the negotiation his team prepares. If the debtor – which is common – refuses the first offer of creditors, the actual negotiation begins, the Chairman acting as a shuttle between the debtor and creditors.

List of chairpersons Incomplete list:

- Jean-Claude Trichet (1985–1993)
- Christian Noyer (1993–1997)
- Jean-Pierre Jouyet (2000–2005)
- Xavier Musca (2005–2009)
- Ramon Fernandez (fr) (2009–2014)
- Bruno Bézard (fr) (2014–2016)
- Odile Renaud-Basso (2016–2020)
- Emmanuel Moulin (2020–2024)
- Bertrand Dumont (2024–present)

== Principles ==
• Solidarity: All members of the Paris Club agree to act as a group in their dealings with a given debtor country and be sensitive to the effect that the management of their particular claims may have on the claims of other members.

• Consensus: Paris Club decisions cannot be taken without a consensus among the participating creditor countries.

• Information sharing: The Paris Club is an information-sharing forum. Paris Club members regularly share views and information with each other on the situation of debtor countries, benefit from participation by the IMF and World Bank, and share data on their claims on a reciprocal basis. In order for discussions to remain productive, deliberations are kept confidential.

• Case by case: The Paris Club makes decisions on a case-by-case basis in order to tailor its action to each debtor country's individual situation. This principle was consolidated by the Evian Approach.

• Conditionality: The Paris Club only negotiates debt restructurings with debtor countries that: 1) need debt relief. Debtor countries are expected to provide a precise description of their economic and financial situation, 2) have implemented and are committed to implementing reforms to restore their economic and financial situation, and 3) have a demonstrated track record of implementing reforms under an IMF program. This means in practice that the country must have a current program supported by an appropriate arrangement with the IMF (Stand-By, Extended Fund Facility, Poverty Reduction and Growth Facility, Policy Support Instrument). The level of the debt treatment is based on the financing gap identified in the IMF program. In the case of a flow treatment, the consolidation period coincides with the period when the IMF arrangement shows a need for debt relief. When the flow treatment extends over a long period of time (generally more than one year), the Paris Club agreement is divided into phases. The amounts falling due during the first phase are treated as soon as the agreement enters into force. Subsequent phases are implemented following completion of conditions mentioned in the Agreed Minutes, including non-accumulation of arrears and approval of the reviews of the IMF program.

• Comparability of treatment: the Paris Club requires that debtor countries obtaining Paris Club relief not offer better terms to non-Paris Club bilateral creditors.

== Meetings ==
Paris Club creditor countries generally meet 10 times per year. Each session includes a one-day meeting called a “Tour d'Horizon” during which Paris Club creditors discuss debt situations of debtor countries, or methodological issues regarding the debt issues more broadly. The session may also include negotiation meetings with one or more debtor countries.

=== Negotiations ===
A debtor country is invited to a negotiation meeting with its Paris Club creditors when it has concluded an appropriate programme with the International Monetary Fund (IMF) that demonstrates that the country is not able to meet its external debt obligations and thus needs a new payment arrangement with its external creditors (conditionality principle). Paris Club creditors link the debt restructuring to the IMF programme because the economic policy reforms are intended to restore a sound macroeconomic framework that will lower the probability of future financial difficulties.

The twenty two permanent members of the Paris Club may participate in the negotiation meetings, as participating creditors if they have claims towards the invited debtor country, as observers if not. Other official bilateral creditors may be invited to attend negotiation meetings on an ad-hoc basis, subject to the agreement of permanent members and of the debtor country. Representatives of international institutions, notably the IMF, the World Bank and the relevant regional development bank also attend the meeting as observers. The debtor country is usually represented by the Minister of Finance. They generally lead a delegation comprising officials from the Ministry of Finance and the Central Bank.

==== Steps in a negotiation ====
After a few words from the chairman to welcome everybody and to open the meeting, the official meeting begins with a statement by the minister of the debtor country, who presents in particular the requested debt treatment.

This statement is followed by statements by the IMF and the World Bank, and, if appropriate, by representatives of other international institutions.

The representatives of creditor countries may then request additional information or clarification from the minister regarding the situation in the debtor country.

After responding to any questions, the delegation of the debtor country then leaves the main room and stays in another room during the entire session.

Creditors then discuss among themselves a proposed debt treatment. Once creditors agree on a treatment, the chairman of the meeting will then present this proposed treatment to the delegation of the debtor country. If the debtor country disagrees and asks for amendments to the creditors' proposal, the chairman will then convey this request to the creditors, who discuss it and consider a new proposal. This process continues until a common agreement between creditors and the debtor country is reached.

Once an agreement is reached on the terms of the treatment, a document called the Agreed Minutes formalizes the accord in writing in French and in English. This agreement is drafted by the Paris Club Secretariat and then approved by the creditors and the debtor.

The delegation of the debtor country then returns to the main room and the Agreed Minutes are signed by the Chairman, the minister of the debtor country and the head of delegation of each participating creditor country.

A press release mutually agreed to by the creditors and the debtor country representatives is released for publication upon completion of the negotiation session.

== Terms ==
On 8 October 2003, Paris Club members announced a new approach that would allow the Paris Club to provide debt cancellation to a broader group of countries. The new approach, named the “Evian Approach” introduces a new strategy for determining Paris Club debt relief levels that is more flexible and can provide debt cancellation to a greater number of countries than was available under prior Paris Club rules. Prior to the Evian Approach's introduction, debt cancellation was restricted to countries eligible for IDA loans from the World Bank under Naples Terms or HIPC countries under Cologne terms. Many observers believe that strong U.S. support for Iraq debt relief was an impetus for the creation of the new approach.

Instead of using economic indicators to determine eligibility for debt relief, all potential debt relief cases are now divided into two groups: HIPC and non-HIPC countries. HIPC countries will continue to receive assistance under Cologne terms, which sanction up to 90% debt cancellation. Non-HIPC countries are assessed on a case-by-case basis.

Non-HIPC countries seeking debt relief first undergo an IMF debt sustainability analysis. This analysis determines whether the country suffers from a liquidity problem, a debt sustainability problem, or both. If the IMF determines that the country suffers from a temporary liquidity problem, its debts are rescheduled until a later date. If the country is also determined to suffer from debt sustainability problems, where it lacks the long-term resources to meet its debt obligations and the amount of debt adversely affects its future ability to pay, the country is eligible for debt cancellation.

=== Policies for heavily indebted poor countries ===
From 1956 to the late 1980s, the Paris Club opposed debt forgiveness or reduction. Instead of granting reductions, it would sometimes be willing to restructure, reschedule, or refinance. The Paris Club refers to this approach as the "classic terms."

As a result of the Latin American debt crisis, the Paris Club began to gradually re-evaluate its unwillingness to provide debt forgiveness or reduction over the course of the 1980s. By the late 1980s, the Paris Club concluded that it was not possible to avoid a vicious cycle of debt without a willingness on the Paris Club's part to write-off non-performing loans. In 1988, the Paris Club agreed to its first partial debt reduction pursuant to its "Toronto terms". The level of reduction was defined as 33.33%. Twenty countries benefited from Toronto terms between 1988 and 1991.

In December 1991, creditors decided to increase the level of cancellation of 33.33% as defined in Toronto, to 50% under the "London terms". These agreements benefited to 23 countries.

Going even further, in December 1994, creditors decided to implement a new treatment called "Naples terms", which can be implemented on a case by case basis. Thus, for the poorest and most indebted countries, the level of cancellation of eligible credit is increased to 50% or even 67% (as of September 1999, all treatments carry a 67% debt reduction). In addition, stock of treatments can be applied in each case for countries that have complied satisfactorily with previous commitments. Up to 2008, 35 of 39 countries have reached the completion point of the Heavily Indebted Poor Countries HIPCs.

Finally, in September 1996, the joint proposal of the Development Committee of the World Bank and the IMF Interim Committee, the international financial community has recognized that the debt situation of a number of very poor countries, of which three quarters are located in sub-Saharan Africa remained extremely difficult, even after having used traditional mechanisms. A group of 39 countries were identified as being potentially eligible for the Heavily Indebted Poor Countries HIPCs.

Since the start of the HIPC initiative, debt relief granted to the 36 post-decision point countries at end-2011 amounts to almost 35 percent of these countries’ 2010 GDP, around US$128 Bn in nominal terms. The total debt relief effort provided under the HIPC initiative is shared by multilateral creditors (44.5%), the Paris Club (36.3%), non-Paris Club bilateral creditors (13.1%) and private creditors (6.1%). Hence, the HIPC initiative represents a genuine and significant financial effort from Paris Club member countries, especially considering that they indirectly contribute to debt relief granted by multilateral creditors, as they are major shareholders of these international financial institutions.

According to the IMF and the World Bank, debt relief granted since the beginning of the HIPC Initiative reduced beneficiary countries’ debt burden by about 90 percent relative to pre-decision point levels. Debt relief has also allowed beneficiary countries to reduce their debt service and to increase social spending. According to the IMF and the World Bank, for the 36 post-decision point countries, poverty reducing spending increased by more than 3 percentage points of GDP, on average, between 2001 and 2010, while debt service payments declined by a similar amount. Such progress is consistent with the HIPC initiative’ objective, namely, to reallocate the increased spending capacity towards the fight against poverty and to accelerate progress toward the United Nations Millennium Development Goals.

Apart from the HIPC initiative, the Paris Club adopted a new framework for debt restructuring in 2003, the Evian approach. Through the Evian framework, the Paris Club's goal is to take into account debt sustainability considerations, to adapt its response to the financial situation of debtor countries, and to contribute to current efforts to ensure an orderly, timely and predictable resolution of economic and financial crises. The approach aims at providing a tailored response to debtor countries’ payment difficulties. Countries with unsustainable debt may be granted a comprehensive debt treatment, provided that they are committed to policies that will secure an exit from the Paris Club process, in the framework of their IMF arrangements.

== Paris Forum ==
The Paris Forum is an annual event, jointly organized by the Paris Club and the rotating Presidency of the G20, since 2013. The conference gathers representatives from creditor and debtor countries, and is a forum for frank and open debate on the global evolutions in terms of sovereign financing and on the prevention and resolution of sovereign debt crises. As international financial markets and capital flows are increasingly integrated, non-Paris Club official bilateral creditors are representing a larger share in the financing of developing and emerging countries. The objective of the Forum, in this context, is to foster close and regular dialogue between stakeholders, in order to create an international financial environment favorable to sustainable growth in developing countries. In particular, the Paris Forum aims at enhancing the involvement of emerging countries, be they creditors or debtors, in international debates on sovereign financing, in order to make discussions as open and frank as possible. The Paris Forum annually gathers more than thirty representatives from sovereign creditors and debtors, of which the members of the G20, the members of the Paris Club, and countries from the different regions of the world.

2024 Paris Forum The eleventh edition of the Paris Forum was held on 26 June in Paris, and was organized by the Paris Club and the Brazilian Presidency of the G20. It gathered 200+ participants representing 80 countries and institutions and was introduced by Vice-minister Tatiana Rosito from Brazil, Vice-minister Liao Min from China, IMF First Deputy Managing Director Gita Gopinath, Minister of Finance of Qatar Ali bin Ahmed Al Kuwari and Ambassador of Germany in France Stephan Steinlein.

== Accomplishments ==
The Paris club has played a major role in debt crisis resolution for a period greater than 65+ years in emerging and developing countries. The rules and principles that are established for negotiations of different types of debt treatments have proven to be highly efficient towards the resolving of various debt crises. Pragmatism and flexibility are important features in the past activity of the Paris club, with the decisions of the group influenced primarily by technical criteria, although sometimes also by political criteria.

Milestones:

- 1956 (16 May): First Paris Club Agreement (Argentina)
- 1966: First Paris Club Agreement with an Asian country (Indonesia)
- 1976: First Paris Club Agreement with an African country (Zaire)
- 1981: First Paris Club Agreement with a European country (Poland)
- 1982: The Mexican crisis triggers the “debt crisis” of the 1980s.
- 1987: First Paris Club Agreement under the Venice terms (Mauritania)
- 1988: First Paris Club Agreement implementing the Toronto terms (Mali)
- 1990: First Paris Club Agreement implementing the Houston terms (Morocco). First debt swap clause in a debt treatment agreement
- 1991: Exceptional exit treatments granted to Poland and Egypt. First Paris Club Agreement implementing the London terms (Nicaragua)
- 1992: First Paris Club Agreement with Russia (deferral)
- 1995: First Paris Club Agreement implementing the Naples terms (Cambodia)
- 1996: Heavily Indebted Poor Countries Initiative (HIPC)
- 1997: Russia joins the Paris Club. First early repayment operation (Argentina)
- 1998: First Paris Club Agreement implementing the Lyon terms under the HIPC initiative (Uganda)
- 1999: Enhanced HIPC Initiative. First Paris Club Agreement implementing the Cologne terms under the HIPC initiative (Mozambique)
- 2000: Uganda is the first HIPC-eligible country to reach the Enhanced HIPC Initiative Completion Point
- 2001: Exceptional debt treatments granted to the Former Republic of Yugoslavia
- 2003: Paris Club creditors approve the Evian Approach
- 2004: First debt treatment under the Evian Approach (Kenya). Phased exit treatment granted to Iraq
- 2005: Exceptional treatment granted to countries hit by the tsunami (Indonesia and Sri Lanka). Exit treatment granted to Nigeria
- 2006: 50th anniversary of the Paris Club
- 2007: First buyback operations at market value below par (Gabon, Jordan)
- 2020: Implementation of the Debt service suspension initiative with other G20 creditors (China, India, Saudi Arabia, Turkey)
- 2020: Implementation of the Common framework for debt treatment
- 2023: First agreements of the Common framework (Chad, Zambia)
- 2024: Agreement of the Common framework for Ghana

The Paris Club granted in November 2004 a cancellation of 80% of the stock of debt owed by Iraq, cancelling nearly 30 billion of dollars of claims, while also granting a moratorium payment until 2008. In February 2006, the United States announced a relief of Afghanistan's debt of $108 million.

In 2005, after the tsunami which affected the countries bordering the Indian Ocean, the Paris Club decided to temporarily suspend some repayments of affected countries. In January 2010, the Paris Club also cancelled Haiti's debt to help it overcome the consequences of the earthquake of 12 January.

Russia had, in May 2005, begun to repay its debt to Paris Club countries. On 21 August 2006, Russia repaid the remainder of its debt to the Paris Club. Gabon and Jordan both bought their debt back in 2007 at market value.

In January 2013, the Paris Club treated $10 billion of debt owed by Myanmar to the Paris Club, cancelling 50% of arrears and rescheduling the rest over 15 years, including 7 years of grace.

There are many other contributions of Paris Club which are deemed notable. The deal with the creditors of the Paris Club and the Argentinian Government on 28 and 29 May 2014 is a landmark deal where an arrangement was made to clear the debt in the arrears which are due to the creditors of the Paris Club in a span of 5 years. The deal covers some amount of $9.7 billion of debts by 30 April 2014. Additionally, there is flexible structure to get the arrears cleared with a minimum of $1,150 million by May 2015, with the payment due to be paid by May 2016. The debt accumulated for Argentina is due to the 2001–02 Argentinian default crises, where there is default amount of $132 billion.

== Criticism ==
Critics argue that the Paris Club is not transparent. In 2006, a significant number of non-governmental organizations have requested a change of rules of the Paris Club, especially for transparency.

The Paris Club created a new website in 2009 which reiterated the terms of all treatment given to 90 debtor countries. Since 2008, the Paris Club has published an annual report. The report includes detailed data on claims that its members hold on foreign states. The total of claims held by the Paris Club at end 2023, excluding late interest, amounts to USD 334.2 billion of which USD 195.3 billion are ODA claims and USD 138.9 billion are NODA claims.

All Paris Club agreements main terms are described on the Club's website.

In 2022, the Paris Club released its conditions to engage with debt treatment to the public.

== See also ==
- London Club
- Coffee Club
- Debt of developing countries
