= European Parliament Intergroup on long term investment and reindustrialisation =

The European Parliament Intergroup on long term investment and reindustrialisation or #invest 4 future is an intergroup of the European Parliament's legislators which focuses on financing of long-term sustainable investment in the real economy within the European Union. It is aimed to accompany European regulatory work during the period 2014-2019.

== Creation ==
The intergroup was set up at the end of 2014, in the context of the Juncker Plan, after a campaign involving different political groups of the European Parliament (Progressive Alliance of Socialists and Democrats, Group of the European People's Party, the Alliance of Liberals and Democrats for Europe), and actors from the public and private financial spheres and from the real economy, such as the European insurance and reinsurance federation (Insurance Europe), the European Association of Craft, Small and Medium-Sized Enterprises (UEAPME), the Association of European Chambers of Commerce and Industry (EUROCHAMBRES), and the European Trade Union Confederation (ETUC). The campaign was initiated by the French Caisse des Dépôts et Consignations, the Italian Cassa Depositi e Prestiti and the German KfW.

== Membership ==
=== Presidency ===
It is headed by three co-Presidents: Dominique Riquet, Simona Bonafé, and Maria da Graça Carvalho.

=== Members ===
As of May 2015 (in the eighth European Parliament) the organisation consists of 71 members, including the aforementioned.

By political group:

- 30 of the Progressive Alliance of Socialists and Democrats (S&D)
- 24 of the Group of the European People's Party (EPP)
- 11 of the Alliance of Liberals and Democrats for Europe (ALDE)
- 3 of The Greens–European Free Alliance (Greens–EFA)
- 2 of the Europe of Freedom and Direct Democracy (EFDD)
- 1 Non-Attached Members

=== Partners ===
About 35 European federations, national associations and single entities have brought their support to the intergroup.
