= Alexis Kohler =

French government official (born 1972)

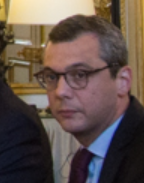

Secretary General to President of France
- In office 14 May 2017 – 15 April 2025
- President: Emmanuel Macron
- Preceded by: Jean-Pierre Jouyet
- Succeeded by: Emmanuel Moulin

Personal details
- Born: Arnaud Alexis Michel Kohler; 16 November 1972 (age 53) Strasbourg, France
- Education: ESSEC Business School; Sciences Po; École nationale d'administration

Arnaud Alexis Michel Kohler (born 16 November 1972) is a French senior official and special adviser. A former director of the cabinet of Pierre Moscovici, then of Emmanuel Macron at the Ministry of Finance, he was appointed secretary general of the Élysée Palace on 14 May 2017.

== Early life and education ==
Born in 1972 in Strasbourg, Alexis Kohler is the son of Charles Kohler, a senior European official, and Sola Hakim, a lawyer. He grew up in Strasbourg.

Kohler attended the Institut d'études politiques de Paris, École supérieure des sciences économiques et commerciales, and the École nationale d'administration.

== Career ==
=== Career in the public sector ===
Kohler began his career at the Direction générale du Trésor of the French Ministry for the Economy and Finance, then he was detached to various organisations, including the International Monetary Fund, then the Agence des participations de l'État.

Following François Hollande's election, Kohler became deputy director of Pierre Moscovici's cabinet, Minister of the Economy and Finance. In August 2014, he became the director of Emmanuel Macron's cabinet at Bercy (where the Ministry of finance is located).

=== Career in the private sector ===
When Macron resigned in 2016 to establish En marche !, Kohler returned to a position in the private sector as chief financial officer of MSC Cruises. At the request of his employer, he settled in Grenoble and then Geneva, but continued to work remotely for Macron by mail and WhatsApp loops. When the 2017 presidential campaign started, he was a central figure in the headquarters of En marche !

=== Secretary General, 2017–2025 ===
Kohler was appointed general secretary of the Élysée on 14 May 2017 and prepared the passage of relay with the outgoing general secretary, Jean-Pierre Jouyet. He is close to Édouard Philippe, whom Emmanuel Macron didn't know much when he appointed him Prime Minister.

In 2022, anti-graft group Anticor filed a complaint accusing Kohler of breaking conflict-of-interest rules after it emerged he had family links to the Italian owners of MSC Cruises. He was subsequently indicted by the national financial crimes prosecutor PNF.

=== Return to the private sector ===
In 2025, L'Opinion reported that Kohler would be joining Société Générale as head of retail banking.

Government offices
Preceded by Jean-Pierre Jouyet	Secretary General of the President of France; 2017–2025	Succeeded by Emmanuel Moulin
