= Jean-Pierre Jouyet =

French politician (born 1954)

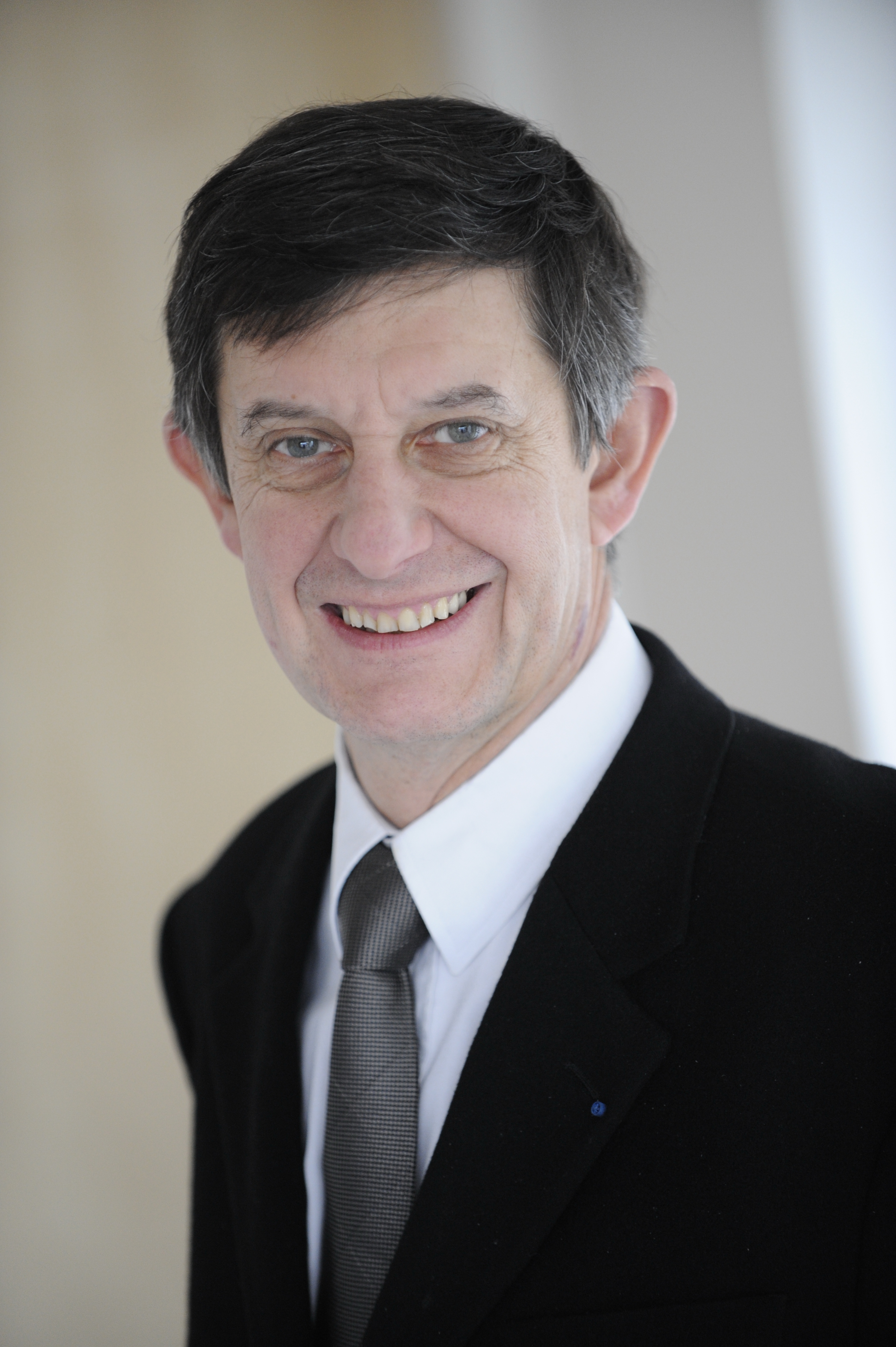
- Jouyet in 2009

Permanent Representative of France to OECD
- In office 2 September 2019 – 27 September 2020
- President: Emmanuel Macron
- Preceded by: Catherine Colonna
- Succeeded by: Muriel Pénicaud

Ambassador of France to the United Kingdom
- In office 11 September 2017 – 2 September 2019
- Monarch: Elizabeth II
- President: Emmanuel Macron
- Preceded by: Sylvie Bermann
- Succeeded by: Catherine Colonna

Chief of Staff of President of France
- In office 16 April 2014 – 14 May 2017
- President: François Hollande
- Preceded by: Pierre-René Lemas
- Succeeded by: Alexis Kohler

Personal details
- Born: 13 February 1954 (age 72) Montreuil, Seine-Saint-Denis, France
- Education: Sciences Po, ÉNA

Jean-Pierre Jouyet (born 13 February 1954) is a French civil servant who served as Minister of State, attached to the Minister of Foreign and European Affairs, responsible for European Affairs in the government of Prime Minister François Fillon from 2007 to 2008. He is considered a close friend of former President François Hollande.

His last political position is secrétaire général Cabinet du président de la République française of French President Hollande. Before that he was president of the Banque publique d'investissement (BPI) and general director of the Caisse des dépôts et consignations from 2012 to 2014, and Chairman of the French securities regulator, the Autorité des Marchés Financiers (AMF), since 15 November 2008. He was the ambassador of France to the United Kingdom between 2017 and 2019.

== Early life and education ==
Jouyet was born on 13 February 1954 in Montreuil-sous-Bois in the suburbs of Paris.

After graduating from Sciences Po, Jouyet went on to study at the École nationale d'administration (ÉNA) in the class of 1980 known as the "Promotion Voltaire".

== Career ==
After which, in accordance with the strict system of selection reserved for honours graduates of ENA in the French Administration he was to immediately be eligible for and become a member of the elite group of Inspecteurs des finances (auditor at the Ministry for the Economy and Finance, with special responsibility for the inspection of public finances), before taking a succession of senior posts such as Principal at the Service de la legislation fiscale (tax legislation department), and Principal Private Secretary of the Minister of Industry, Foreign Trade and Town and Country Planning until 1991.

From 1991 to 1995, Jouyet worked – initially as Deputy and then Head of Cabinet – for President of the European Commission Jacques Delors.

From 1995 until 1997, Jouyet was a partner in Jeantet & Co, a French business law firm, which he left at the request of the Prime Minister Lionel Jospin to become his Deputy Principal Private Secretary until 2000, during which he contributed to France's entry into the Eurozone.

Jouyet was then to become Head of the French Trésor Directorate from 2000 until 2004. During his tenure at Trésor, he also served as president of the Paris Club.

In 2004, Minister of Finance Nicolas Sarkozy appointed Jouyet as France's Ambassador for international economic affairs.

Briefly non-executive chairman of Barclays Bank France in 2005, he was then designated Head of the Inspection générale des finances within the Ministry of Finance until 2007, before subsequently being appointed Minister of State responsible for European Affairs in François Fillon's government. His mission was to make the necessary preparations for France's Presidency of the council of the European Union in the second half of 2008.

Ahead of the 2007 presidential election, Jouyet was one of the initiators and signatories of the petition which was to become known as "l'appel des Gracques" seeking an alliance between France's Socialist Party and the center-right Union for French Democracy (UDF).

At the conclusion of this assignment, Jouyet was then nominated by President Sarkozy on 14 November 2008 to become Chairman of the French securities regulator, the AMF, to replace Michel Prada, at the end of his non-renewable 5-year mandate, on 15 December 2008.

Honorary President of the Club Témoin since 1999, and president of the Club Démocratie in 2000.

Director of Studies at IEP from 1981 to 1988, he was to be a lecturer in 1996 and 1997, before becoming Associate Lecturer in 2006.

He was master of Lectures at ENA in 1982, 2006 and 2007. He currently chairs a commission which is reviewing the system under which graduates are attributed posts within the French administration at the conclusion of their studies at the ENA.

== Other activities ==
=== Corporate boards ===
- Covéa, Member of the Board of Directors (since 2021)

=== Non-profit organizations ===
- Musée des impressionnismes de Giverny, Member of the Board of Directors (since 2022)
- Institute Pasteur, Chair of the Board of Directors (since 2011)
- Aspen Institute, Chair of the Supervisory Board (since 2010)
- Institut du Bosphore, Member of the Scientific Committee
- Collège des Bernardins, Patron
- National Foundation of Political Sciences, Member of the Board (since 2006)
- Bpifrance, Chair of the Board of Directors (2012–2014)

== Personal life ==
Jouyet has been married to his second wife Brigitte Taittinger since 2006. Taittinger is one of the grand daughters of Pierre Taittinger, who founded the celebrated firm of champagne which bears his name, and serves as the chair and CEO of Annick Goutal Perfumes.

In 2012, one of Jouyet’s sons died.

== Bibliography ==
He is the joint author with Philippe Mabille of Don't Bury France (N'enterrez pas la France) published in February 2007, before jointly penning with Sophie Coignard Une présidence de crises published in February 2009. He is also the author of Nous les avons tant aimés, published in February 2010.
