= Xavier Musca =

Chief of Staff of President of France
- In office 2011–2012
- President: Nicolas Sarkozy
- Preceded by: Claude Guéant
- Succeeded by: Pierre-René Lemas

Personal details
- Born: 23 February 1960 (age 66) Bastia, France
- Education: Sciences Po, ÉNA
- Occupation: Civil servant

Xavier Musca (born 23 February 1960 in Bastia, Corsica) is a French economist, writer, and public administrator. In February 2011, he was appointed the Secretary-General of the French President Nicolas Sarkozy and was in charge of economic affairs. He served as a deputy for two years.

== Education ==
- Institut d'Etudes Politiques de Paris (IEP)
- École nationale d'administration (ÉNA), "Léonard de Vinci" class (1985).

== Positions ==
- 1985 - Auditor, Inspection Générale des Finances
- 1988 - 1989 Adviser to the head of the Inspection Générale des Finances
- 1989 - 1990 Special adviser, Bureau for Energy, Transportation and Mines, charged with the FDES (economic and social development fund) secretariat at the Treasury Directorate
- 1990 - 1993 Head of the European Affairs Bureau at the Treasury Directorate
- 1993 - 1995 Technical adviser for Financial Affairs and International Economic Issues in the Private Office of Prime Minister Edouard Balladur.
- 1995 - 1996 Head of the Financial Market Bureau at the Treasury Directorate
- 1996 - 2000 Deputy Director for Europe and Monetary and International Affairs at the European and International Affairs Division of the Treasury Directorate
- 2000 Chargé de la sous-Direction du financement de l'économie et Head of the Division for the Financing of the Economy and Business Competitiveness, and subsequently Deputy Director
- Member of the plenary group of the Euro Taskforce
- 2001 - May 2002 Head of the Department for the Financing of the State and the Economy at the Treasury Directorate
- May 2002 - June 2004 Principal Private Secretary to Francis Mer, Minister of the Economy, Finance and Industry
- June 2005 - February 2009 Director General of the Treasury and Economic Policy and President of the Paris Club, a group of finance officials from 19 of the world's richest countries
- February 2009 - Deputy Secretary General of the French President's Office
- February 2011 - Appointed Secretary General

== Career in the private sector ==
- Amundi, Member of the Board of Directors (since 2016)
- Capgemini, Independent Member of the Board of Directors (since 2014)
- Banco Espírito Santo, Non-Executive Member of the Board of Directors (since 2012)
- CNP Assurances, Member of the Board of Directors (since 2007)

== Works ==
- Code monétaire et financier, Alice Pezard and Xavier Musca; Ed. Litec (2005); ISBN 2-7110-0592-5
- Rapport Moral sur l'Argent dans le Monde, Hubert Martini, Dominica Deprée, Joanne Klein-Cornede, and Xavier Musca; Association d'Economie Financière (2006); ISBN 2-911144-92-9
