= London Club =

Informal group of private creditors

The London Club is an informal group of private creditors on the international stage, and is similar to the Paris Club of public lenders. The London Club is not the only informal group of private payables. The first meeting of the London Club took place in 1976 in response to Zaire's debt payment problems.

The London Club of commercial banks has been responsible for rescheduling countries debt payments to commercial banks.

== See also ==
- Paris Club of public lenders another informal group of private payables.
- Debt of developing countries
