= Emmanuel Moulin =

Governor of the Bank of France since 2026

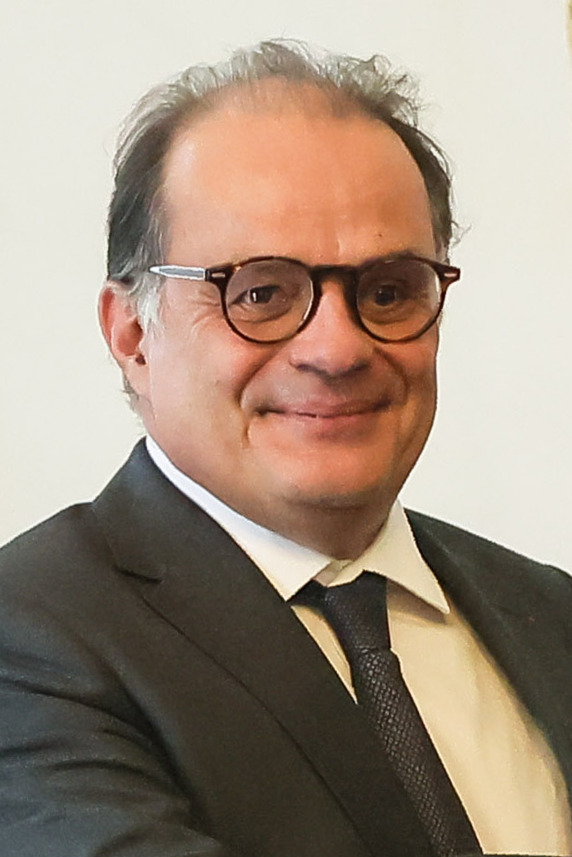
- Moulin in 2025

Governor of the Bank of France
- Incumbent
- Assumed office 2 June 2026
- Preceded by: François Villeroy de Galhau

Secretary-General to the President of France
- In office 15 April 2025 – 4 May 2026
- President: Emmanuel Macron
- Preceded by: Alexis Kohler
- Succeeded by: Pierre-André Imbert

Personal details
- Born: Emmanuel Pierre René Moulin; 22 October 1968 (age 57) Versailles, France
- Occupation: Civil servant

Emmanuel Pierre René Moulin (French pronunciation: [emanɥɛl mulɛ̃]; born 22 October 1968) is a French senior civil servant who has served as Governor of the Bank of France and ex officio President of the French Prudential Supervision and Resolution Authority since June 2026.

== Career ==
From 2007 until June 2009, Moulin served as Deputy Chief of Staff to Christine Lagarde when she was Minister of Economy, Finance and Industry. He then joined the Presidency of the Republic as economic advisor to Nicolas Sarkozy. After François Hollande's election, he went to work in private sector, first at Eurotunnel and then at Mediobanca.

In 2017, he was appointed Chief of Staff to the Minister of the Economy and Finance Bruno Le Maire.

From 2020 to 2024, he served as Director General of the Treasury.

From January to September 2024, he served as chief of staff to prime minister Gabriel Attal.

He then served as secretary general of the presidency under Emmanuel Macron from 2025 to 2026.

Following Villeroy de Galhau's resignation, Macron appointed Moulin to serve as governor of the Banque de France (the French central bank) and his nomination was approved by the French Parliament in May 2026.

Government offices
Preceded by Alexis Kohler	Secretary General of the President of France; 2025–2026	Succeeded by Pierre-André Imbert
