= European Bureau for Conservation and Development =

The European Bureau for Conservation and Development (EBCD) is an environmentally focused non governmental organisation (NGO) founded in 1989 and based in Brussels, Belgium. EBCD aims to promote sustainable use of natural renewable resources not just in Europe, but worldwide as well. The EBCD works closely with the European Union (EU) institutions, tracking EU work on environmental policy, concentrating on fisheries and marine policies.

EBCD provides, in association with the International Union for Conservation of Nature, the Secretariat of the Members of the European Parliament (MEP) Group: “Climate Change, Biodiversity and Sustainable Development”.

EBCD's mission: to ensure the conservation and sustainable use of natural renewable resources including species and ecosystems both for their intrinsic and direct value to the benefit of humanity

== Main Activities ==
- Secretariat of the The MEP Group on “Climate Change, Biodiversity and Sustainable Development”
- Secretariat of the IUCN European Sustainable Use Specialist Group (ESUSG) and the coordination of Fisheries Working Group (FWG)
- Secretariat of the Fisheries Experts Group of the IUCN/CEM/FEG
