= Gérard de La Martinière =

French businessman (1943–2023)

- Born: 12 September 1943
- Died: 13 November 2023 (aged 80)
- Education: Graduate
- Alma mater: École polytechnique
- Occupation: Businessman

Gérard de la Martinière (12 September 1943 – 13 November 2023) was a French businessman specialized in the insurance industry. He notably headed AXA as well as the French federation of insurance companies.

== Biography ==
Gérard de La Martinière was born on 12 September 1943. A graduate of École polytechnique (X1963) and ENA, he was a general inspector of Finances, working in the Ministry of Finances from 1969 to 1984.

De La Martinière joined AXA in 1989 and was director-general for finances, control and strategy, and a member of the direction board (directoire).

From 2003, and for a mandate of 3 years, he was head of the French federation of insurance companies.

De La Martinière died on 13 November 2023, at the age of 80.
