= Philippe Wahl =

French business executive (born 1956)

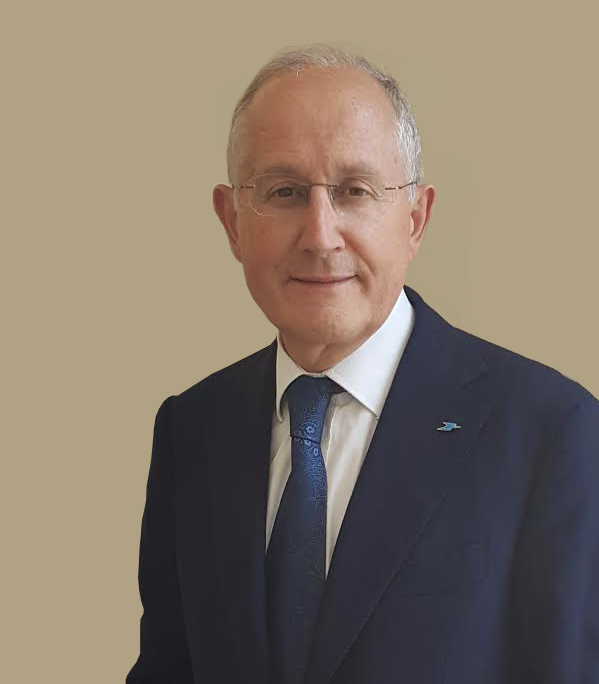
- Wahl in 2017
- Born: 11 March 1956 (age 70); Sarralbe, Moselle, France
- Education: Sciences Po, ÉNA
- Occupations: CEO of La Poste Chairman, French ASP Investment Group
- Spouse: Sylvie Schwob
- Children: 3

Philippe Wahl is a French business executive. Having previously been a government advisor and bank executive, in September 2013 he was appointed president and chief executive officer of La Poste, the group which includes the French postal service.

== Early life and education ==
Wahl's parents are Adrien Wahl, a human resources director, and Georgette Meyer, a teacher. He graduated from Sciences Po in 1978 and has a Master of Advanced Studies degree in economics from Pantheon-Sorbonne University. In 1982–84 he earned a degree from the École nationale d'administration.

== Career ==
Wahl began his career in government in 1984 at the Council of State as an auditor and Master of Requests; in 1986, he also became an advisor to the president of the Commission des opérations de bourse, the French stock market regulator. In 1989, he became cabinet director to Tony Dreyfus when Dreyfus was Secretary of State under Michel Rocard, then became Rocard's technical advisor on economic, financial, and fiscal matters. Under Rocard, he was able to achieve the passage of the Contribution sociale généralisée, a social benefits tax, despite the opposition of the then Minister of Finance, Pierre Bérégovoy.

In private business, he worked for Compagnie Bancaire in 1991 as an advisor to the CEO, from 1992 as a member of the board, and from 1994 as assistant CEO. In 1997, he became director of the specialist financial services arm and a member of the executive committee at Banque Paribas, with which Compagnie Bancaire merged. In 1999, he became CEO of the French directorate of savings banks, CNCE (now Groupe BPCE). This position carried with it the presidency of the holding group Sopassure, the board of the insurer Écureuil assurances IARD, and membership on the governing boards of CDC Ixis and CNP Assurances. In 2005, he became CEO of Havas and, in 2006, vice president of Bolloré. In January 2007, he returned to banking at The Royal Bank of Scotland Group, initially as CEO for France; in March 2008, he became advisor to the RBS Global Banking and Markets Board; and in December 2008, he became CEO for France, Belgium, and Luxembourg.

In January 2011, Wahl was appointed chairman of the board of the Banque postale division of La Poste and adjunct CEO of the La Poste group. On 25 September 2013, the President of France appointed him president and chief executive of La Poste, succeeding Jean-Paul Bailly. He has promised to pursue three goals: economic health, good working conditions, and above all, customer satisfaction, which he has developed in his 2014 strategic plan, La Poste 2020.

He implements a diversification strategy for La Poste's activities, developing, amongst others, home-care services for seniors, and sessions of the driving licence written exam. In 2016, he signed a contract to take majority stakes in Axeo, a large network of local branches specializing in neighbourhood services. He also expands Geopost's activities in Italy, Russia, Brazil and Vietnam.

== Other activities ==
- La France s’engage Foundation, member of the board
- Institut Montaigne, member of the board of directors

== Personal life ==
Wahl is married to Sylvie Schwob, a human resources executive at Sanofi whom he met at university, and has three children.
