= Geopost =

International parcel delivery service

Geopost SA
- Trade name: Geopost SA
- Formerly: DPDgroup (2015–2023)
- Type: Limited
- Industry: Courier
- Founded: 1999; 27 years ago in Paris, France
- Headquarters: Issy-les-Moulineaux, France
- Areas served: Worldwide
- Key people: Yves Delmas (CEO)
- Services: Parcel delivery Express mail freight forwarding Third-party logistics
- Revenue: ▲€15.8 billion (2024)
- Owner: La Poste
- Number of employees: 55,000 (2024)
- Subsidiaries: DPD; BRT; Chronopost; CitySprint; Seur; Speedy AD; Jadlog; Ninja Van (40%); DTDC (42%)
- Website: geopost.com

Geopost SA (formerly DPDgroup) is a French multinational logistics company and an international parcel delivery service for sorter compatible parcels based in Issy-les-Moulineaux, France. Until 2015 DPD stood for Dynamic Parcel Distribution. Its brands are DPD, Chronopost, Seur, Speedy AD and BRT. The company is based in France and operates mainly in the express road-based market. Geopost is owned and operated by La Poste, the French state-owned postal service.

Geopost services are available in Europe, Asia, South Africa, India, Brazil and several other countries, either directly or through partnerships.

In 2024, Geopost delivered 2.1 billion parcels worldwide and achieved revenues of €15.8 billion.

== History ==
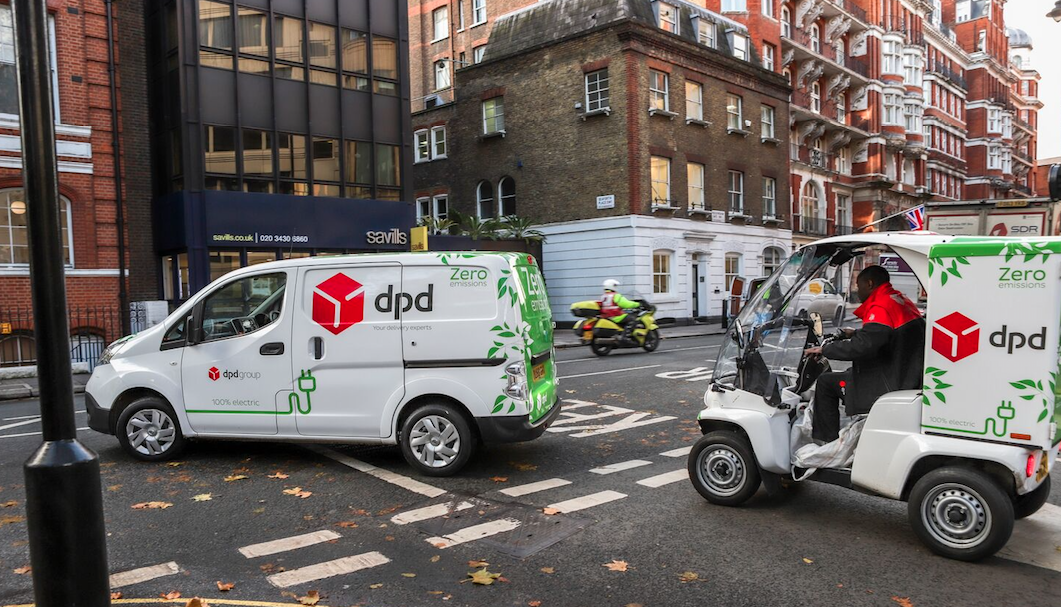
DPD delivery vehicles in London

Geopost bought the UK-based Parceline (now DPD UK) and Ireland's Interlink (now DPD Ireland) parcel service in November 2000, for around $277 million.

In 2001, Geopost became the main shareholder of DPD, a company created in 1977 in Aschaffenburg, West Germany (Deutscher Paketdienst until January 2008, then Dynamic Parcel Distribution). In the same year, Geopost rebranded Parceline as DPD, completing the transition in March 2008.

Geopost then made successive acquisitions:

- In 2004, 40% of SEUR Internacional, the number 1 private operator in Spain
- In 2006, Exapaq (now DPD France).
- In 2007, Yurtiçi Kargo (Turkish) sold a 25% share to Geopost as part of a partnership agreement.

In 2015, Geopost combined its DPD, Chronopost and Seur brands under one umbrella: DPDgroup. On this occasion, Exapaq became DPD France and the logo of Chronopost was modified to show it was part of DPDgroup.

In 2018, the stake in the SEUR network was increased to 94% and DPDgroup acquired a minority stake in Ninja Van, a specialist in last-mile services in Southeast Asia.

In 2019, DPDgroup became the major shareholder in BRT by increasing its share in the capital to 85%, acquired a majority stake in Lenton, the Asian-based cross-border service provider and entered into an agreement with the logistics company in the Czech Republic and Slovakia Geis Parcel.

In 2020, DPDgroup increased its stake to 98% in Jadlog in Brazil.

In 2023, GeoPost/DPDgroup rebranded as Geopost, replacing the company’s logo and substituting a lower-case p in the name.

== Activities ==
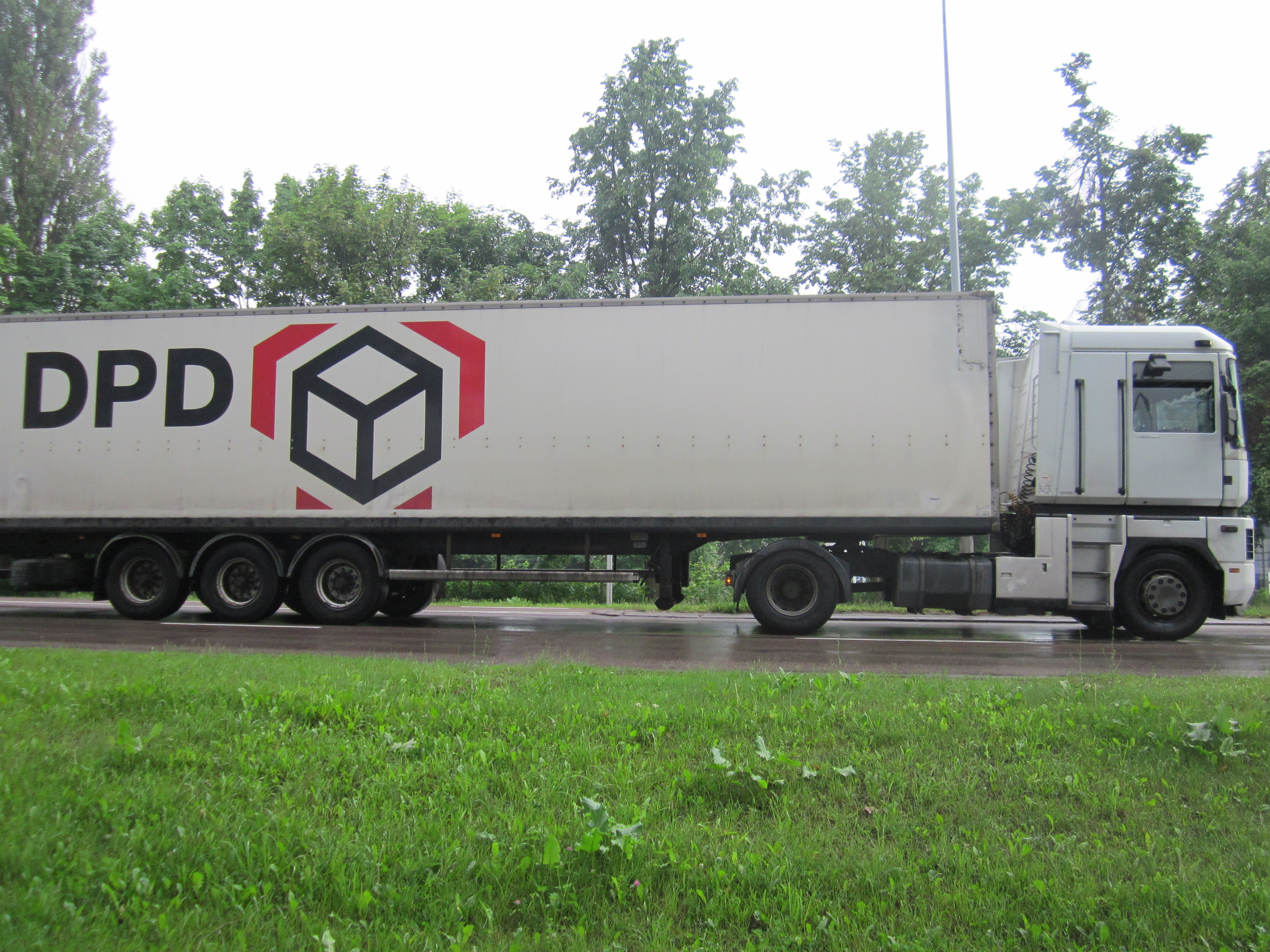
Renault Magnum delivery lorry in Poland in 2014, with the previous logo

=== Types of services ===
Geopost operates in the light-weight parcel delivery market (less than 31.5 kg), which is typically referred to as the “CEP” market (courier, express and parcel).

The CEP market differs from courier services (that do not require a sorting centre) and from freight (that requires several people or equipment to handle the parcels).

Geopost operates in the different sub-segments of the CEP market, which are defined according to the following criteria:

- delivery time: Geopost operates in the standard or deferred parcel segment (without guaranteed delivery times, which ranges from 24 to 72 hours depending on the destination) and in the express parcel segment (guaranteed next-day delivery in the domestic market, and next-day to two-day delivery for international)
- geographic coverage: Geopost is specialised in domestic deliveries in the markets in which it is present (nationwide delivery), and in intra-European deliveries. It is also expanding in the intercontinental market.
- nature of the sender and recipient: Geopost covers parcel flows between businesses (BtoB), between consumers (CtoC), from business to consumer (BtoC) and from consumer to business (CtoB)

=== International presence ===
Geopost mainly operates in Europe, with a direct presence in 24 countries:

- under the DPD brand (in Austria, Belarus, Belgium, Croatia, the Czech Republic, Estonia, France, Germany, Hungary, Ireland, Latvia, Lithuania, Luxembourg, the Netherlands, Poland, Portugal, Romania, Slovakia, Slovenia, Switzerland, the United Kingdom)
- under the Chronopost brand (in France)
- under the SEUR brand (in Spain)
- under the BRT brand (in Italy) where an international heavy shipments service is also offered
- under the Speedy brand (in Bulgaria)

The company also operates through joint ownership and commercial partnerships in other European countries such as Nova Poshta in Ukraine, PostNord in the Nordic countries, and Yurtiçi Kargo in Turkey, which it GeoPost has partly owned since 2007.

Outside of Europe, Geopost operates:

- in Kazakhstan and Russia (under DPD brand)
- in Brazil (98% in Jadlog)
- in India (43% in DTDC)
- in South-East Asia (36.6% in Ninja Van) and in China (65% in Lenton Group)
- in Morocco, Burkina Faso and Mauritius (under the Chronopost brand)
- in Egypt (20% in Bosta)
- in South Africa (under DPD Laser)

== Organization ==
=== Management ===
Since the beginning of 2022, the company has been chaired by CEO Yves Delmas, who is also Executive Vice-president of La Poste Groupe.

== Metrics ==
=== Financial data ===
- Revenues: €15.8 billion (2024, +1 compared to 2023)
- Operating profit: €614 million (2024)

=== Operational data ===
- International: 83% of revenues from outside France (2020)
- BtoC: 55% of the volume (2020)
- BtoB: 45% of the volume (2020)
- Number of parcels delivered worldwide: 2.1 billion (2024)
- 13.9 million parcels handled worldwide on peak day (30 November 2020)

=== Human resources data ===
- Staff: 55,000 employees (in full-time equivalent), including 41,000 out of France (2024)

== Strategy ==
Geopost's strategy is to develop its business in several lines:

- International market, through external growth operations, stakes in companies or commercial partnerships
- BtoC market, support e-commerce and develop innovative last-mile services: interactive delivery (Predict service), delivery on Saturday (Germany) and Sunday (United Kingdom, Spain and France), delivery by appointment, delivery in parcel shops and lockers with more than 58,000 Pickup points worldwide, or delivery by drone. To do so, DPDgroup set up in April 2019 a hub in Eindhoven (Netherlands), the largest sorting centre in Europe.
- New market segments such as e-commerce food delivery (e.g. Chronopost's Chronofresh service or “Seur Frio” in Spain) or same-day delivery (Spain, Portugal, France, United Kingdom, Hungary, Poland, Estonia, Lithuania, Latvia, Belgium and Luxembourg) or even delivery within two hours (Germany, Spain). In 2017, DPDgroup increased its investment in the urgent courier delivery market with the 100% acquisition of Stuart, a French company that developed a last-mile delivery technology platform for merchants and e-merchants willing to deliver their end-consignees more quickly and accurately. Finally, DPDgroup has started to position itself in the controlled temperature delivery market (transport of sensitive products in the healthcare, pharmaceutical and environmental sectors). The company acquired stakes in Biocair in 2012, BioLogistic (specialised in express delivery for laboratories) in 2016, acquired the Groupe ALP companies in France in 2017 via Chronopost, and finally acquired in 2019 Tipsa in Spain, specialised in the express transport of parcels.

=== Corporate social responsibility ===
In 2012, the company committed itself to carbon-neutral deliveries. CO_{2} emissions are gradually being reduced and offset, through support for renewable energy projects in India and Brazil. In 2019, DPDgroup reduced its CO_{2} emissions generated by road transport by 14% per parcel compared to 2013.

Offset of the remaining transport emissions is done by purchasing carbon credits. DPDgroup's investment represents more than 1% of the global voluntary carbon offset market in 2019.

For inner-city deliveries, DPDgroup has implemented smart urban delivery initiatives. Since October 2019, Chronopost France has been operating 100% green deliveries in Paris, thanks to low-emission vehicles and urban depots. In autumn 2018, DPD UK's first urban depot opened in London and now 700 electric vehicles are deployed in the United Kingdom, to form the largest UK green livery. The company's green fleet and urban depots are in line with London's Ultra Low Emission Zone standards. Deliveries by alternative vehicles are also operated in Dublin, Hamburg, Madrid, Tallinn and Warsaw.

In November 2019, DPDgroup launched a Group-wide air quality monitoring programme measuring air quality with sensors on vans and Pickup points. Data are provided for free to cities & citizens.

In October 2020, DPDgroup announced its commitment to deliver 225 of the largest European cities with zero- and low-emission delivery means.

== Controversy ==
=== Don Lane affair ===
In February 2018, DPD faced widespread criticism in the UK due to the treatment of Don Lane, one of its couriers. Lane had previously been fined £150 by DPD UK for attending a medical appointment to treat his diabetes and ultimately collapsed and died of the condition. According to Lane's widow, he had missed appointments with specialists because he felt under pressure to cover his route. Frank Field MP, Chairman of the House of Commons' Work and Pensions Select Committee, said "DPD have been told time and again that their punitive regime is totally unjust, particularly as their workers are labelled ‘self-employed’. Such mistreatment of workers smacks of sweated labour from the Victorian era." In March 2018, DPD UK announced that they would be offering all of their UK workers the opportunity to be classed as employees, and that they would abolish the fines for missing work. Plans were announced in March 2018 to create a DPD Driver Code later in the year, and to introduce a "self-employed worker" contract, which will offer drivers an alternative to working as a direct employee of DPD UK or working with the company on a self-employed basis.
