= La Poste (France) =

Postal service company in France

- Trade name: La Poste S.A.
- Company type: Public limited company
- Industry: Postal services, courier
- Founded: 1991; 35 years ago (first occurrence of French national postal services in 1477)
- Headquarters: 9 rue du Colonel Pierre Avia; Paris, France
- Area served: France, Monaco, Andorra
- Key people: Philippe Wahl (CEO)
- Services: Letter post, parcel service, banking, insurance, mobile network operator
- Revenue: ▲€34.6 billion (2021)
- Net income: ▼€2.1 billion (2021)
- Total equity: ▲€20.9 billion (2021)
- Owner: Caisse des dépôts (66%); French government (34%)
- Number of employees: 249,304 (2019)
- Parent: Groupe La Poste
- Subsidiaries: Docaposte; Geopost; Greenovia; La Banque Postale; La Poste Immobilier; La Poste Mobile; Mediapost; Viapost
- Website: laposte.fr

La Poste (French pronunciation: [la pɔst]) is a postal service company in France, operating in Metropolitan France, the five French overseas departments and regions and the overseas collectivity of Saint Pierre and Miquelon. Under bilateral agreements, La Poste also has responsibility for mail services in Monaco through La Poste Monaco and in Andorra alongside the Spanish company Correos.

The company was created in 1991 following the split of the French PTT, a government department responsible for mail, telegraph and telephone services in France. The PTT, founded in 1879, was then divided between La Poste, which became responsible for postal service, and France Télécom (nowadays Orange) for the telecommunication services. France Télécom was immediately privatised but La Poste has remained a public company. However, in 1997 EU directive 97/67/EC required member states to "fully open the postal sector to competition", with the result that the French government allowed private postal service companies in 2005 and transformed La Poste into a public-owned company limited by shares in 2010.

La Poste is part of the Groupe La Poste, which also comprises a bank and insurance company (La Banque Postale), a logistics service company (Geopost) and a mobile network operator (La Poste Mobile). Although its postal activities are declining because of the development of the Internet, they still represented half of the company's income. Other activities, such as parcel delivery and banking, are on the rise. The two represented respectively a quarter of the company's income in 2017.

== History ==
=== Kingdom of France ===
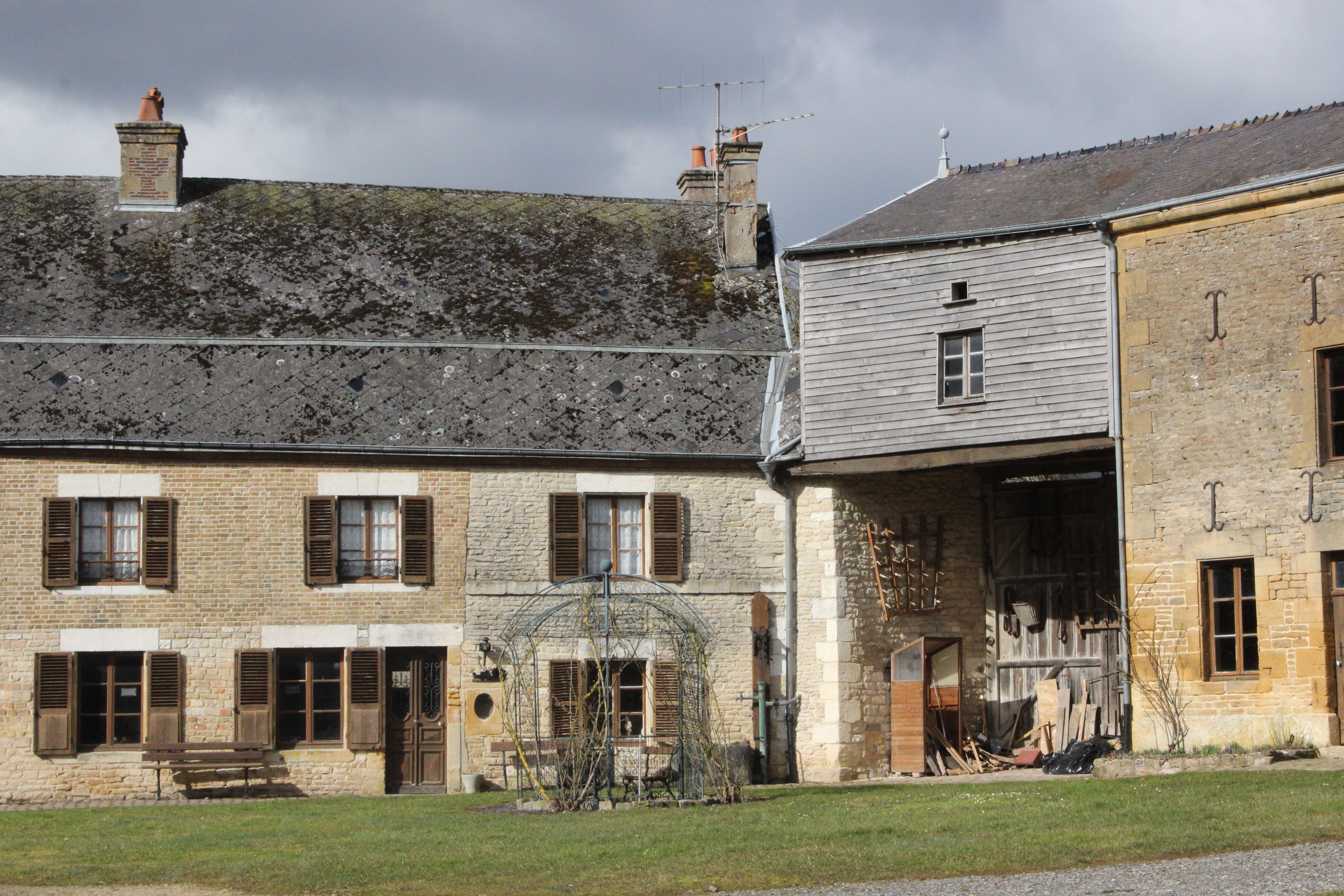
A coaching inn in Launois-sur-Vence

During the Middle Ages, postal delivery in France was not organised by the state and was provided by private enterprise. University envoys dominated the market from 13th century onwards. In 1477, King Louis XI created coaching inns to deliver his own letters. These inns were for temporary use and usually led to battlefields. In 1576, royal mail delivery was further improved with the creation of the office of royal envoy. Royal envoys were allowed to provide services to private individuals. They prefigured modern postal services and their existence led to the appearance of the first post offices at the end of the 16th century.

The first set of fees appeared in 1627 for letters sent to Bordeaux, Lyon, Toulouse and Dijon. As with the rest of Europe, stamps did not exist in France at that time and mail was paid for by the recipient. The first map of post roads was published in 1632 and a book compiling lists of roads and inns including distances and fees to be paid was released in 1707. A new edition was released every two years until 1859. The country already had 623 coaching inns in 1632 and the figure reached 800 at the beginning of the 18th century. A ferme générale was created for mail services in 1672, which meant that postal services started to be subject to taxation. Tax officers progressively bought private postal companies and university envoys became subjects to the ferme générale in 1719. International treaties regarding postal services were signed with neighbouring countries under Louis XIV.

=== Birth of a national postal service ===
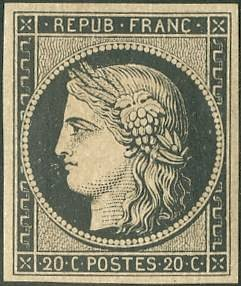
The "Black Ceres", the first stamp issued in France

During the French Revolution French postal services progressively became a fully public service. Directors of post offices lost their privileges in 1789 and their position became subject to universal suffrage. The ferme générale was abolished two years later and post offices started to be directly administered by the state. As a reaction to the commonplace opening of letters by the royal authorities, an oath of confidentiality became compulsory for post employees in 1790. The first French mail coach appeared in 1793 and the first telegram in the world was delivered in 1794 with Claude Chappe's optical telegraph on the Paris-Lille line.

After the Revolution, French postal services continued their modernisation. An 1801 decree reasserted the state monopoly on mail delivery, postal orders were created in 1817 and postage stamps were introduced in 1849, nine years after they were invented in the United Kingdom. A rural service was implemented in 1830 with mail delivery in rural areas every two days. The delivery became daily from 1832.

France was a founding member of the General Postal Union in 1874. The organisation became the Universal Postal Union in 1879.

=== French PTT ===
Post and telegraphs were united in one administration by the French government in 1879, giving birth to the P&T ("Postes et télégraphes") which later became the PTT ("Postes, télégraphes et téléphones"). A French Ministry of Post and Telegraphs was created the same year. A national savings bank was opened in 1881 and added to the services provided by the P&T. The government took a monopoly over telephone services in 1889 and placed this responsibility under the P&T. The administration then became PTT and kept this name until 1959 when it became "Postes et Télécommunications", although the acronym PTT was kept.

Postal cheques were created in 1918. The first airmail flight operated in 1912 between Nancy and Lunéville and a regular airmail network was put in place in 1935 through the "Air Bleu" company. Night airmail services started in 1939 on two lines: Paris-Bordeaux-Pau and Paris-Lyon-Marseille. Postcodes were introduced in France in 1964.

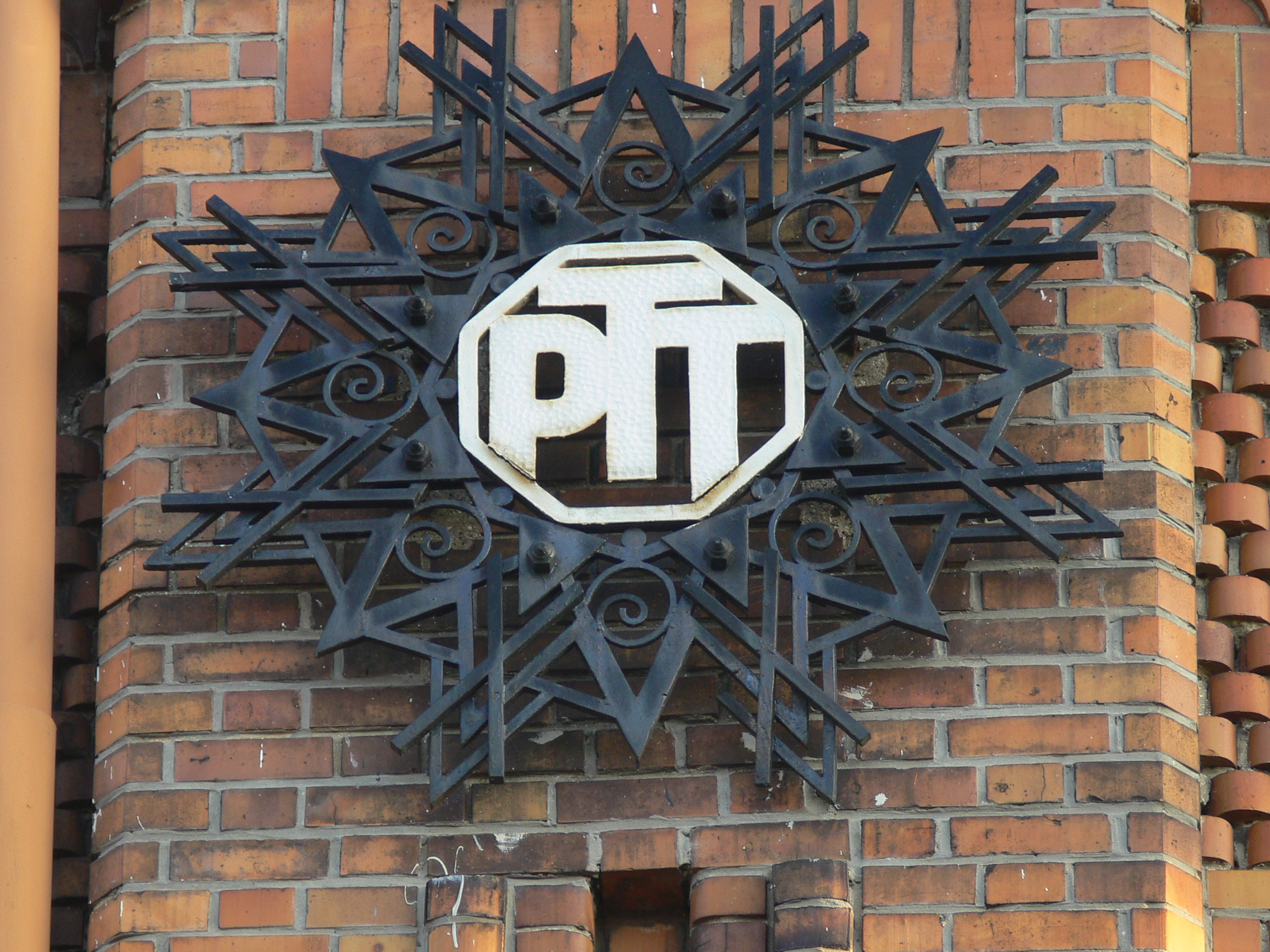
Logo of the French PTT on a former post office in Lille

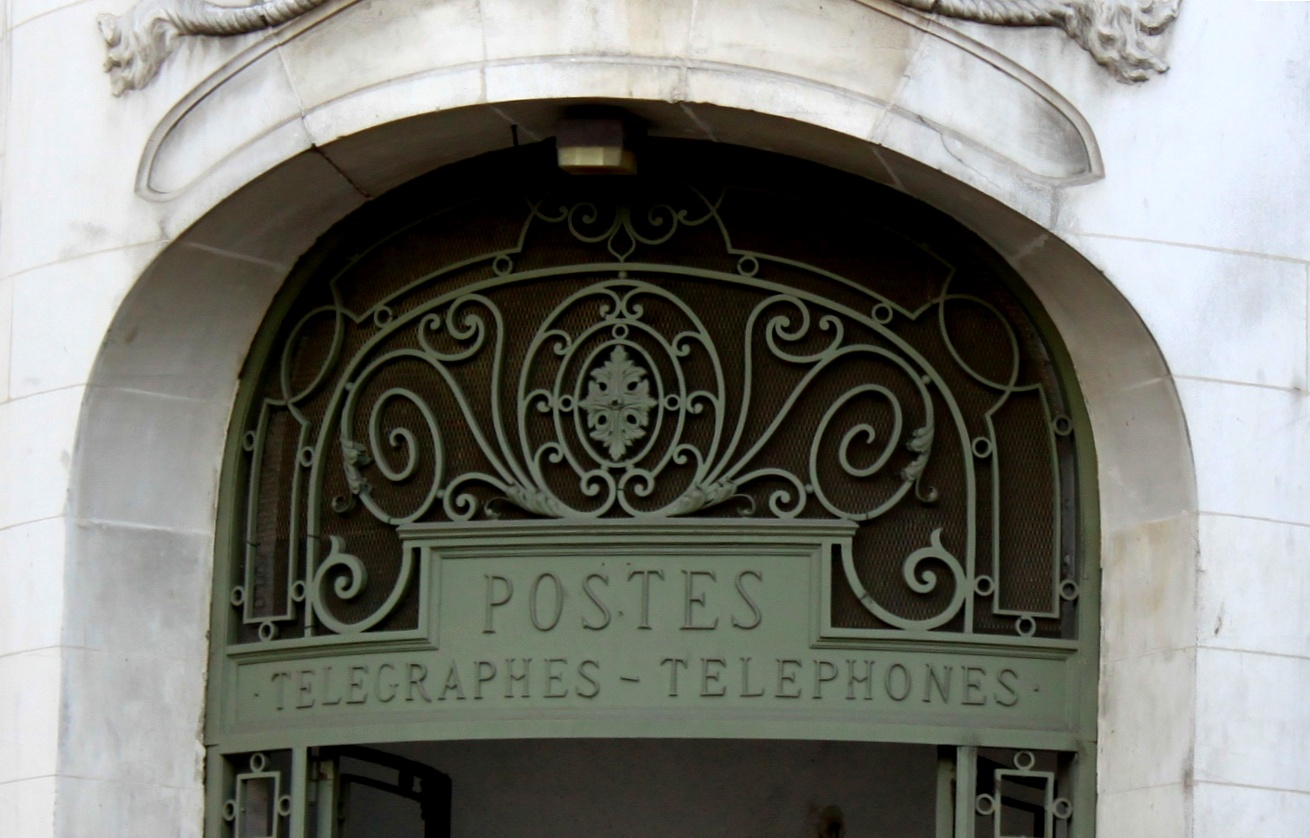
A PTT sign in Auxerre

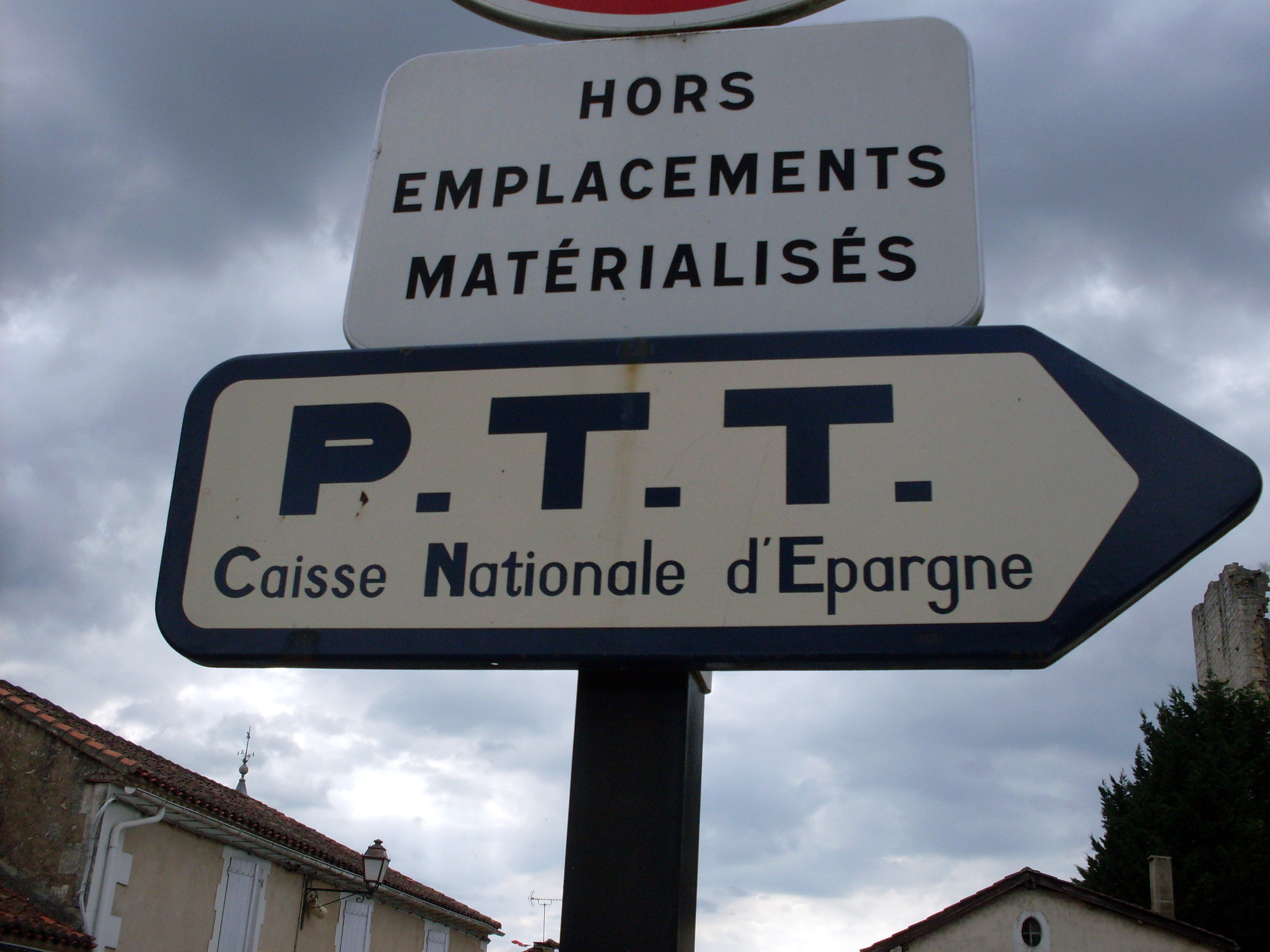
A 1950s PTT road sign in Marthon

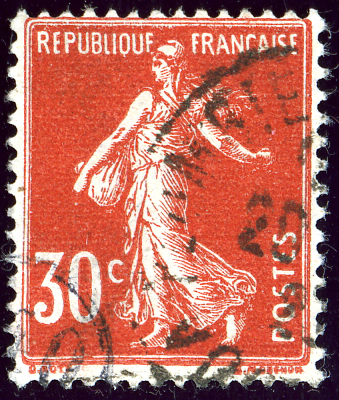
A 1922 stamp

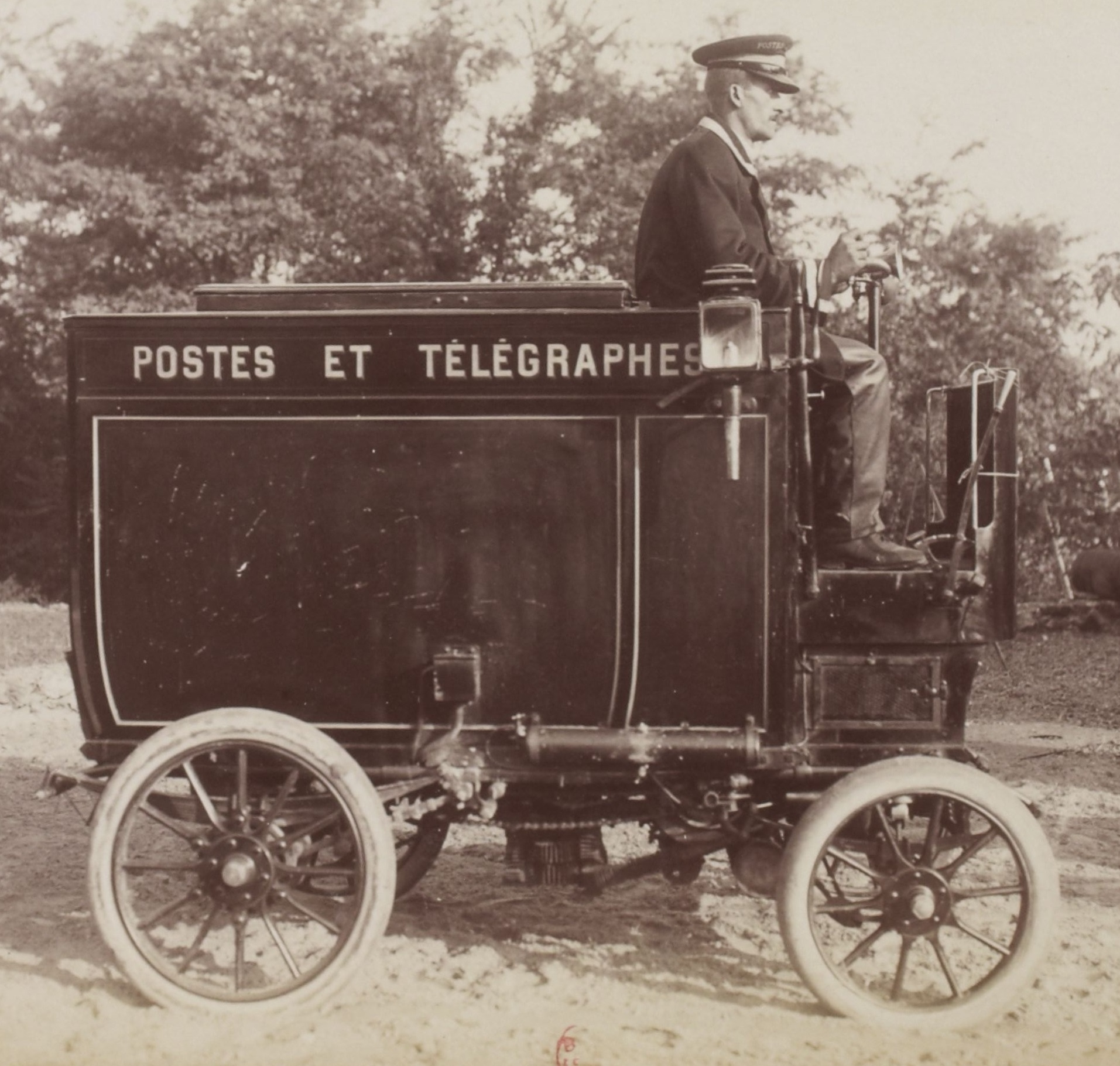
A mail van in 1901

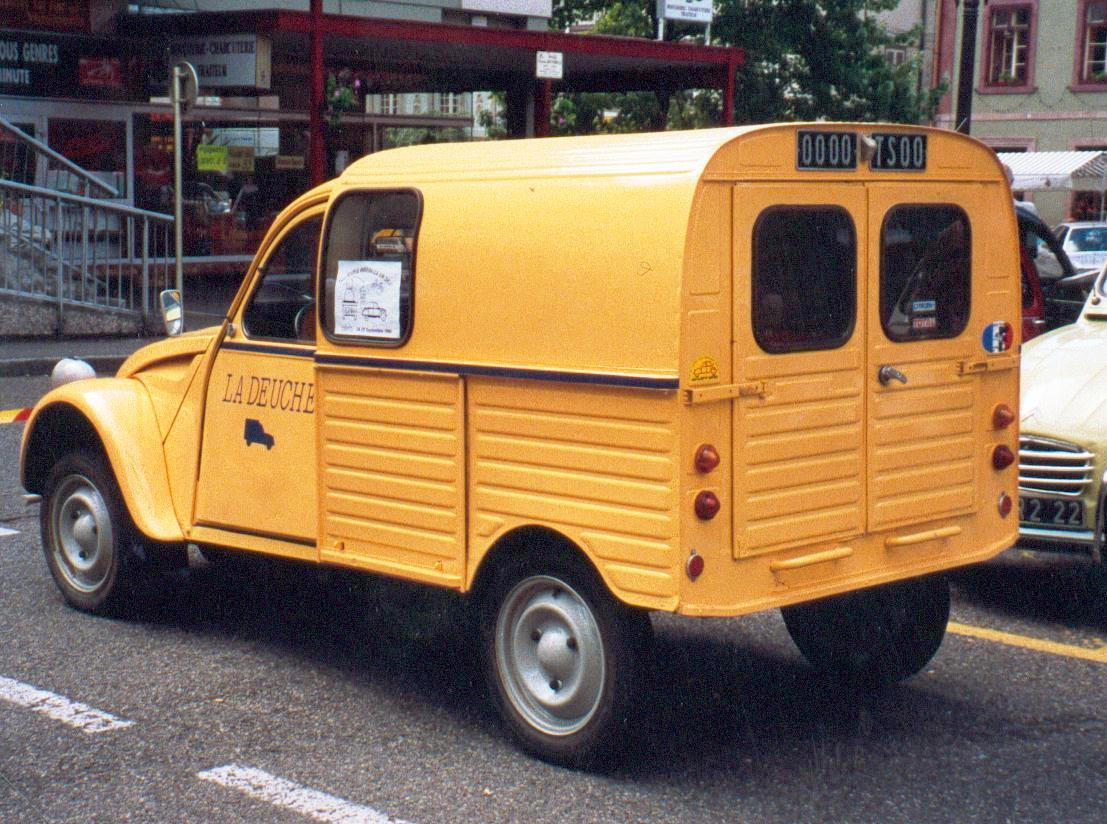
A Citroën 2CV vehicle used by PTT

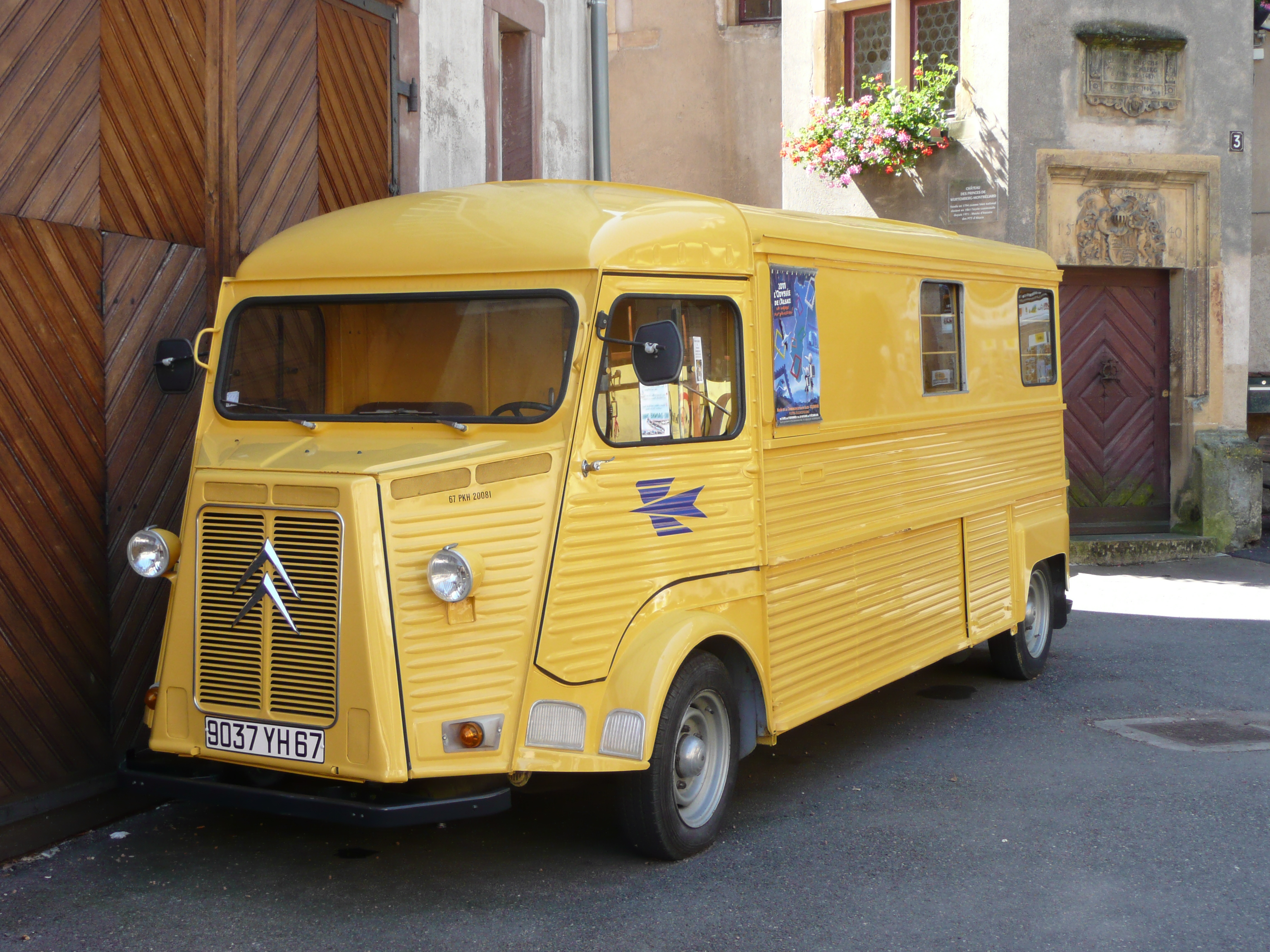
A Citroën H Van used by the PTT

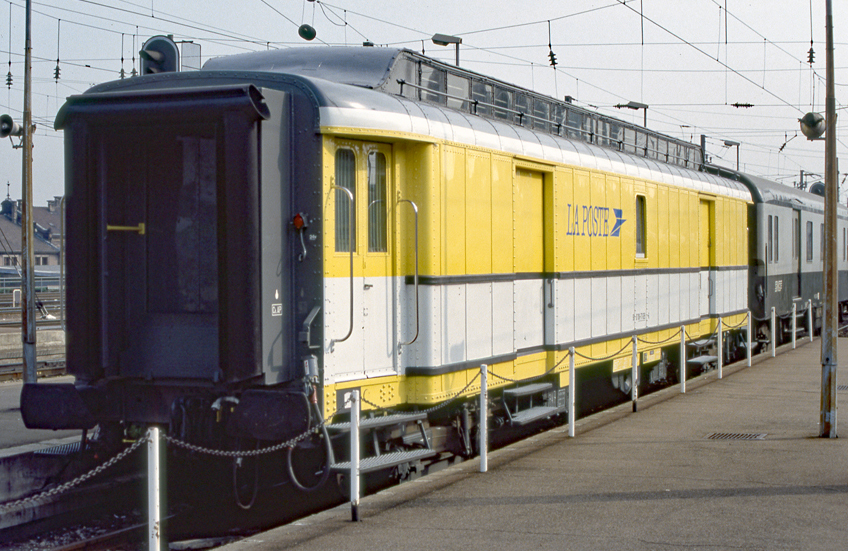
Travelling post office at Strasbourg

=== La Poste ===
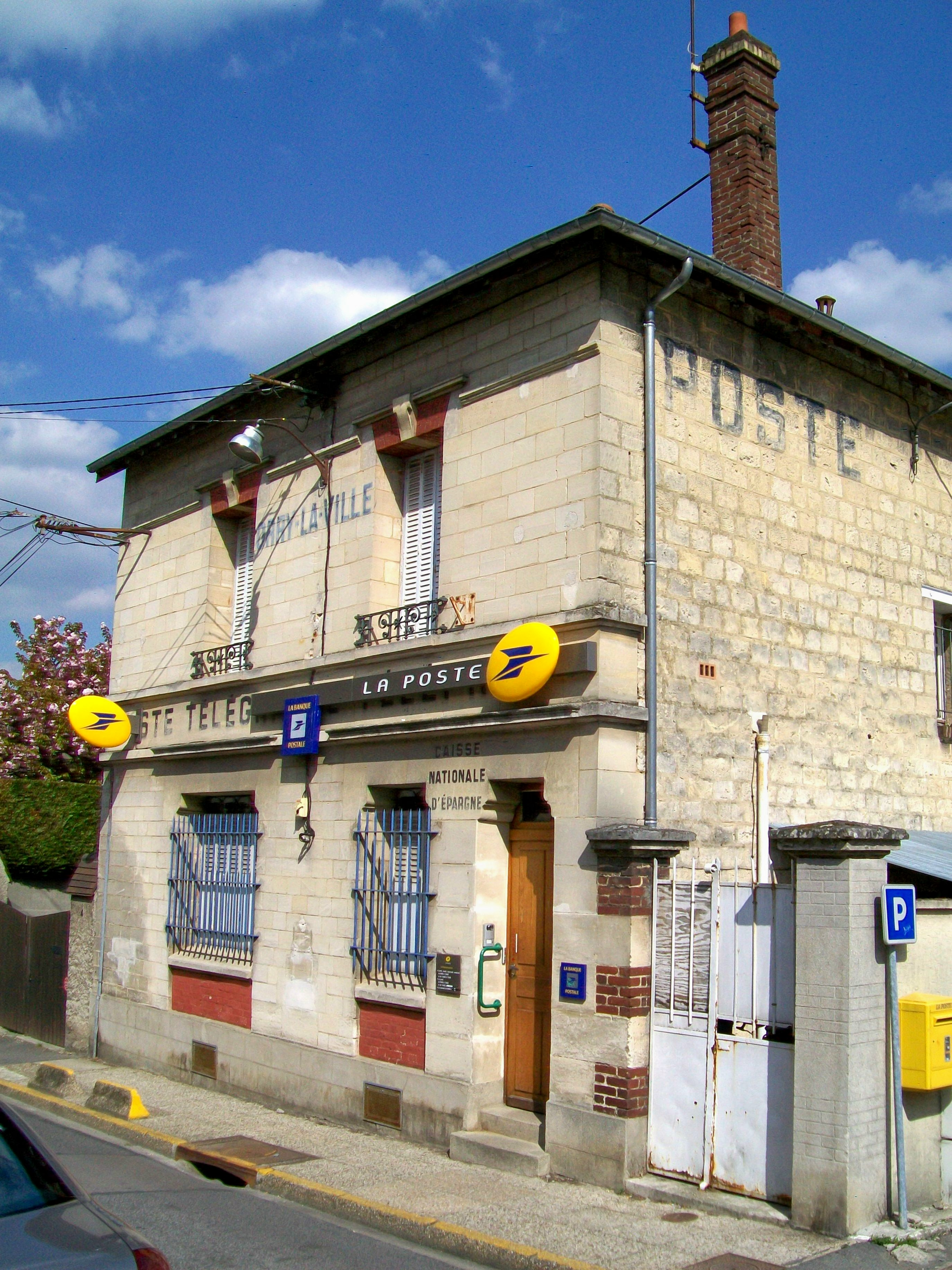
A French post office in 2011 in Orry-la-Ville

==== Before 2005 ====
In the 1980s, it became clear that the French PTT could not compete anymore in a country where communication was greatly increasing. The administration suffered from a constant lack of innovation and was dependent on political will and decisions. A division between postal and telecommunication services was suggested as early as 1974 in a report from the French parliament. However, changes in the structure of the PTT were opposed by trade unions who feared that employees could lose their status as civil servants.

In 1988, under the premiership of Socialist Michel Rocard, a law was finally prepared to split the PTT and enable the government to get the services out of the public administration and to prepare for competition from private firms. Such a move was encouraged by the European Economic Community, and the United Kingdom had already separated its national telephone company from its postal services in 1981. Most of the other member states did the same in the late 1980s and early 1990s.

Trade unions organised several strikes but the law was adopted in 1990. La Poste and France Télécom were officially created on 1 January 1991. The two had the status of "autonomous operators under public law". While France Telecom was privatised and floated on the stock exchange in 1997, La Poste has remained a public service.

Since its creation, the company has had to face strong competition from the Internet. As a result, it has tried to innovate and diversify its activities. In 2000, it became a webmail provider and created GeoPost, its logistics and parcel delivery subsidiary. The following year, it released its online trading platform to reinforce its online banking services. To comply with the law and EU directives, the banking activities had to form a distinct subsidiary in 2006, called La Banque postale. It received the official status of a bank while it had remained a public savings bank until then.

Mediapost (styled MEDIAPOST), founded in 1987 as Médiapost, is a subsidiary of La Poste specializing in advertising mail. It was merged with the free newspaper distributor Delta Diffusion after La Poste acquired the latter in an agreement with Comareg. In 2015, Mediapost registered revenues of more than €446 million. It employed 12,000 people as of 2019.

==== After 2005 ====
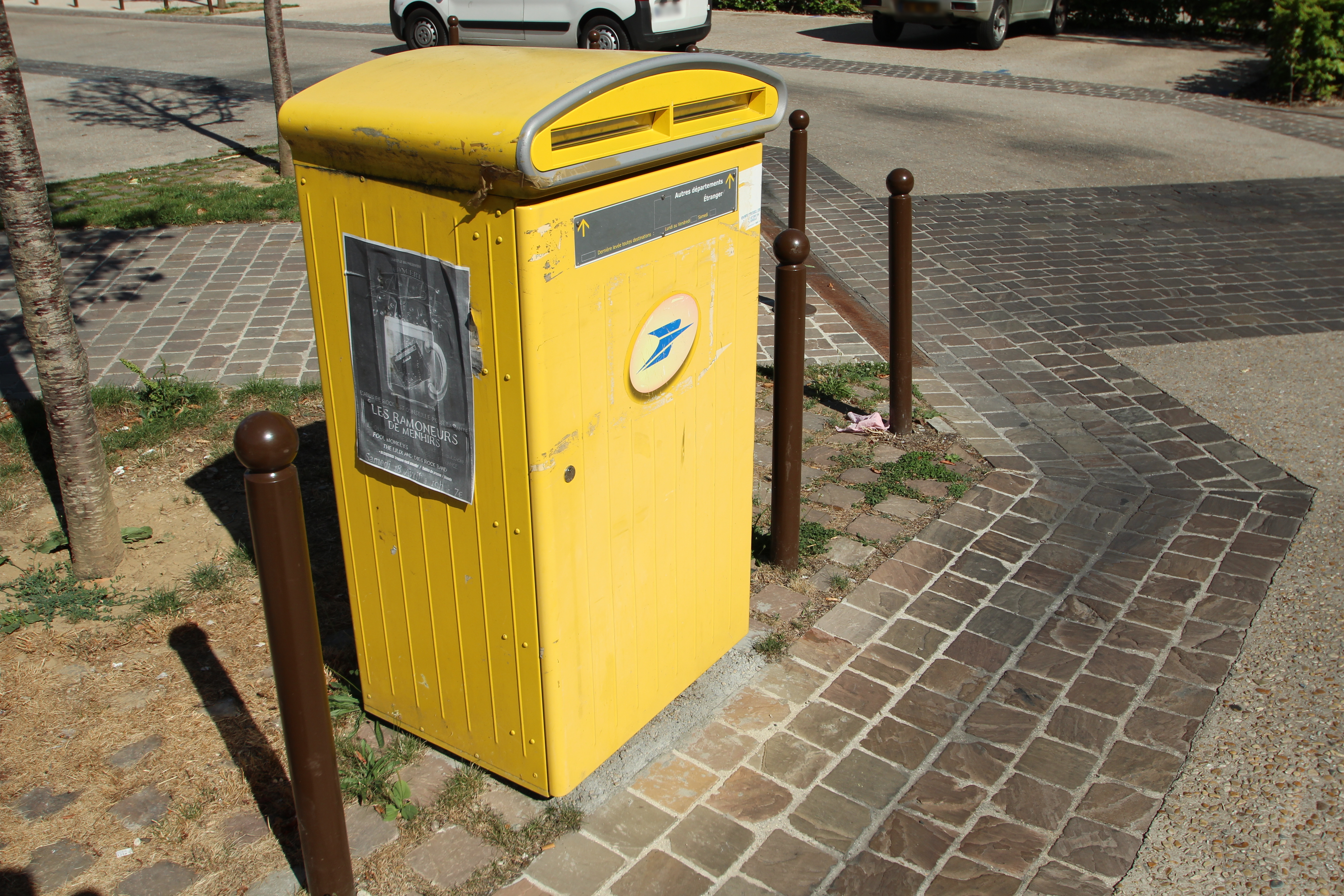
A contemporary pillar box in Gif-sur-Yvette

La Poste lost its monopoly on postal delivery in 2005. Since then, several competing firms have started businesses in France. Most of them only deliver parcels (for example, TNT Express, DHL Express and United Parcel Service) or recorded letters, while mail delivery itself could not attract private companies. Most of the companies dealing with mail services only operate on a local scale, because they could not compete with the extremely wide network of offices that La Poste enjoyed throughout the country.

La Poste became a public limited company in 2010. Although most of the Western European countries had fully privatised their postal service companies, public opinion in France was largely against such a move. A majority of French citizens feared that if La Poste becomes a private company, many post offices would close, rural areas would be neglected and stamps would be more expensive. Supporters of privatisation claimed that it would help solving the debt (€5.8 billion in 2009) and contain the rise of prices.

In 2013 La Poste invested around €1 billion in renovating post offices, modernising infrastructure and reinforcing its network, along with the purchase of electric delivery vehicles. Acquisitions included more Seur franchises in Spain, a 40% stake in Indian parcel firm DTDC and a similar stake in French parcel firm Colizen. The company also bought a 66% stake in freight forwarder Tigers. Via its joint venture with Swiss Post, Asendia, the Group acquired Pitney Bowes’ international mail business operations in the UK, and a 40% stake in Irish e-commerce firm eShopWorld.

In December 2016, La Poste launched a regular delivery line by drones to deliver to isolated companies in secluded areas of France.

== Activities ==
=== Mail delivery ===
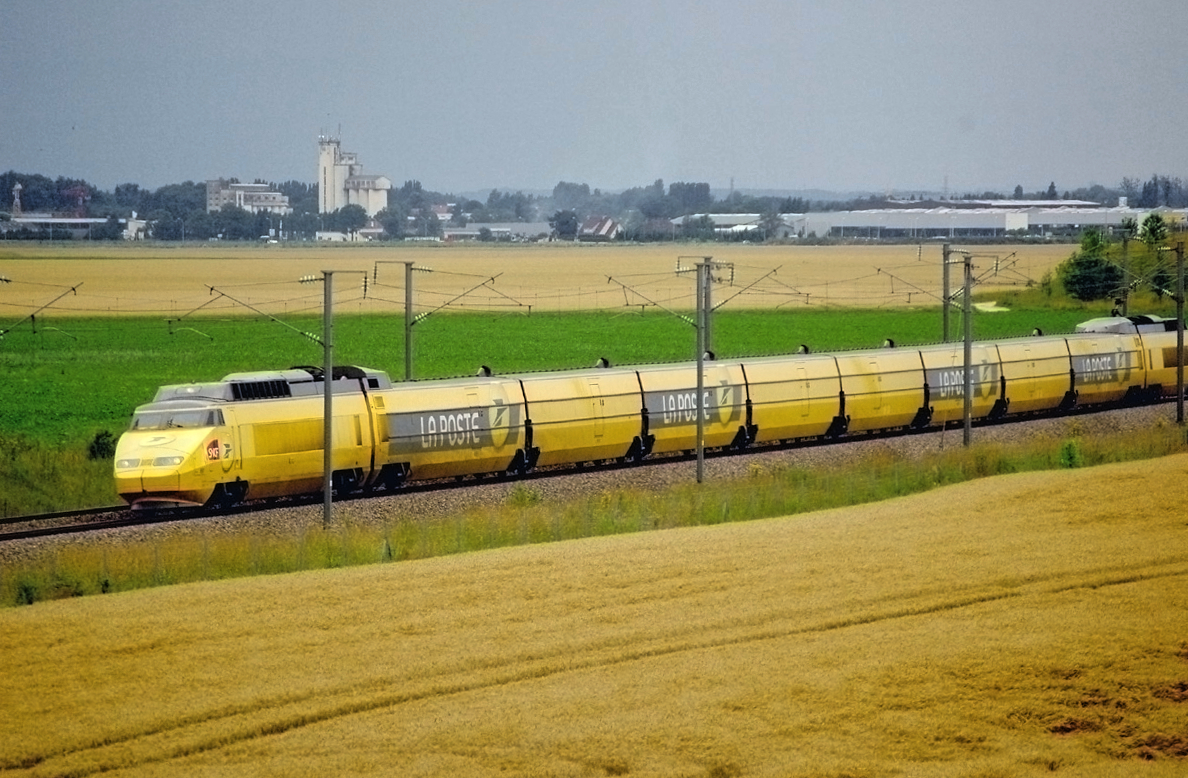
A postal TGV (service discontinued in 2015)

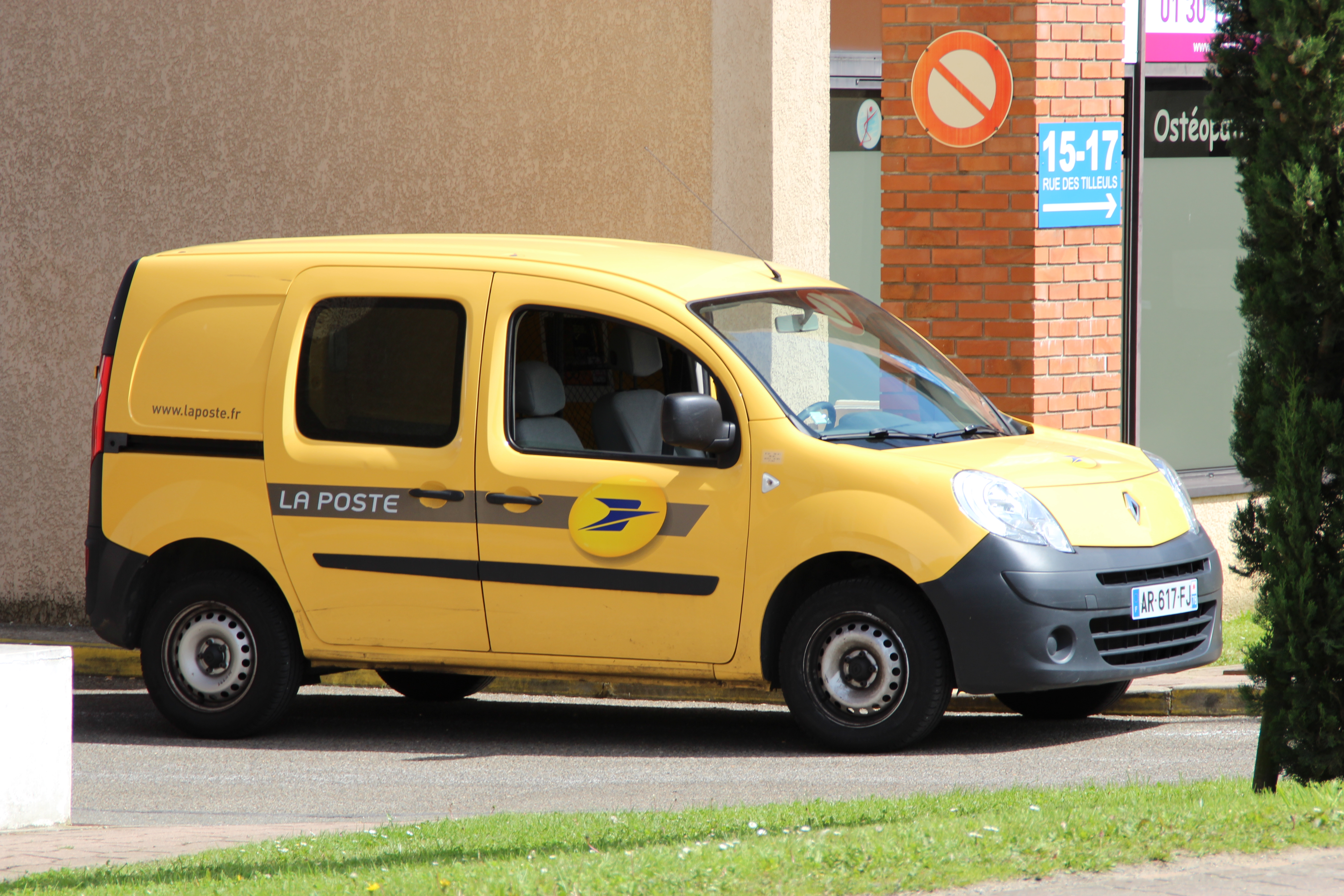
La Poste electric Renault Kangoo

La Poste is by far the largest provider for mail delivery in France. It treated 15 billion messages in 2012, of which 97% implied an administration or a firm. Relations with customers only represented 55% of the company's revenue (55% for business relations; 16% for advertisement). International mail delivery accounted for 7% of the 2012 revenue. The same year, Swiss Post and La Poste launched a joint company, Asendia, to merge their international mail activities.

La Poste offers three different rates for sending mail in France: first-class, second-class and green letter. The latter was introduced in 2011 to provide an ecological alternative to the regular rates. It emits 15% less CO_{2} than first-class letters. In 2012, it accounted for one in five priority letters (20 percent of priority letters).

=== Parcels and express (GeoPost) ===
La Poste directly provides parcel service under the brand name Colissimo; however, Groupe La Poste also operates other subsidiaries providing express parcel delivery. Most of these faster parcel services are grouped under GeoPost which provides two brands in France, Chronopost and DPD (formerly Exapaq). Worldwide, the brands are DPD, Yurtiçi Kargo and Seur GeoPost.

La Poste is the second biggest provider for parcel delivery in Europe, with a 15% share of the market and a €5 billion revenue.

In 2017, Geopost expanded its activities in Italy, Russia, Brazil and Vietnam.

=== Last mile delivery ===
In 2015 La Poste invested €22 million into Stuart Delivery before it was officially launched. In 2017 La Poste brought Stuart Delivery owing 100% of the shares Stuart Delivery is a subsidiary of the DPD group and is operating in 86 cities across the UK, Italy, France, Spain, Poland, and Portugal.

On 6 December 2021 couriers in the UK for Stuart Delivery organising with IWGB started a strike. Stuart couriers told that they started the current strike after Stuart enforced a 24% pay cut in December 2021, which saw base pay rates slashed on most deliveries from £4.50 to £3.40. It is the longest gig work strike in UK history.

In the UK, according to Corporate Watch Stuart Delivery made £41 million in profits from UK deliveries in 2021, over double the £20.5 million it had made in 2020. Stuart Delivery's UK accounts show an unnamed director was paid £2.2 million in 2020.

=== Other activities ===
In addition to postal services, La Poste also offers banking and insurance services (with La Banque Postale) and, via Chronopost, courier services. After the government, La Poste is the second largest employer in France. It also offers webmail, providing @laposte.net email addresses and hosting approximately 1.6 million active email accounts in 2007. More recently, the group has created a branch for communication counselling (Mediaprism), document exchange and archiving (Docapost), real estate (Poste Immo) and mobile telephony (La Poste Mobile, in partnership with SFR).

== Corporate identity ==
Yellow is the main colour of the French post since the 1960s. Previously, postal vans used to be green and post boxes blue. Yellow was chosen because it is a colour that is easily seen and because it can symbolise speed and light. The logotype of La Poste was created by poster designer Guy Georget. It represents a bird, often called the "postal bird" ("l'oiseau postal"), symbolising a messenger. Its design was slightly altered by Georget in 1978.

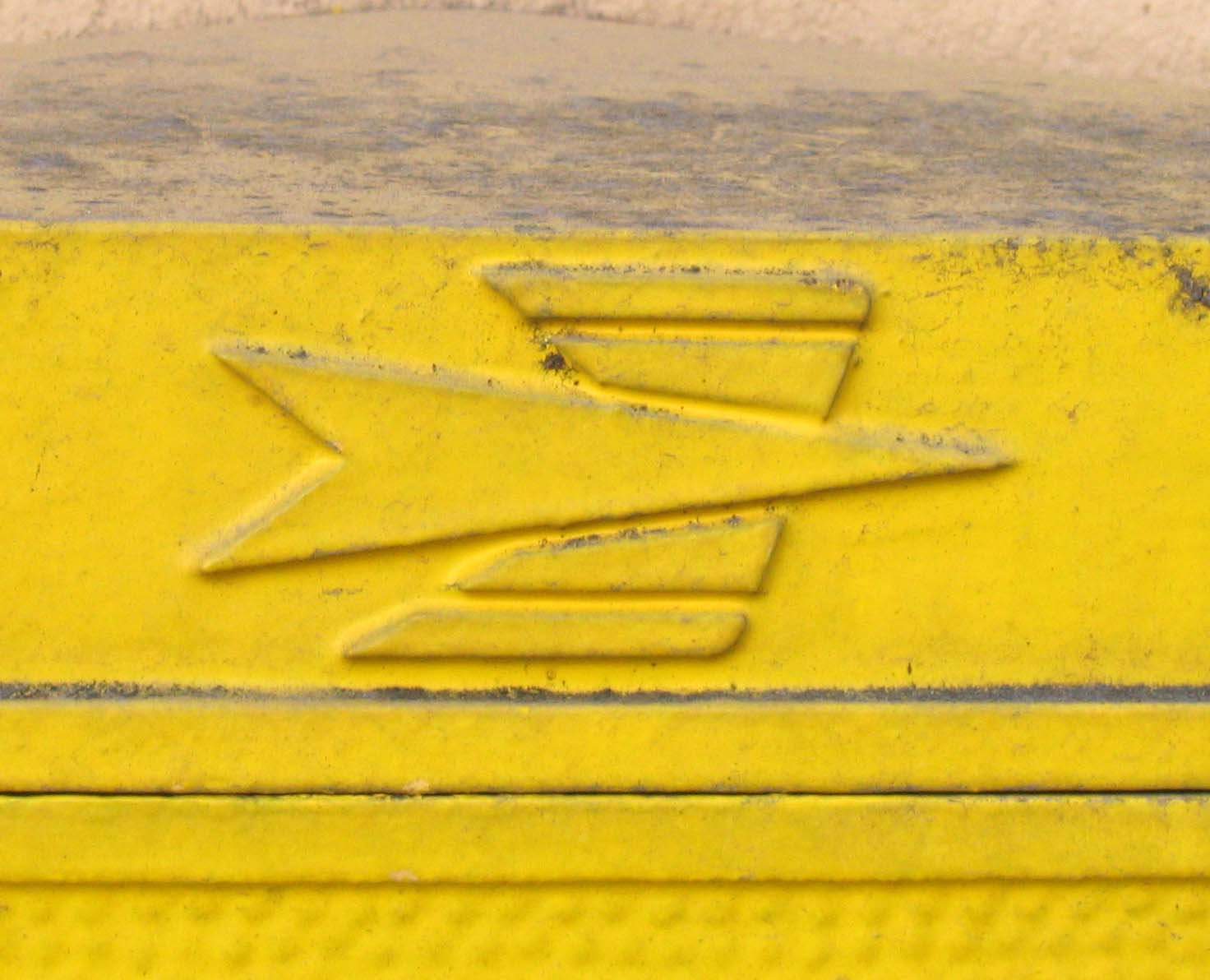
The 1960 bird

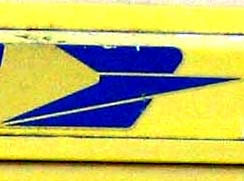
Current design

== See also ==
- Caribbean Postal Union
- Dirigisme
- Evolution of stamp prices in France
- List of national postal services#Europe
