= Ninja Van =

Singaporean last mile logistics company

- Type: Private
- Industry: Courier
- Founded: 2014
- Founder: Lai Chang Wen; Shaun Chong; Boxian Tan
- Headquarters: Singapore
- Area served: Singapore; Thailand; Indonesia; Philippines; Myanmar; Malaysia; Vietnam
- Key people: Lai Chang Wen (CEO)
- Website: ninjavan.co

Ninja Van is a Singaporean logistics company. Founded in 2014, the company engages in last mile logistics and package delivery. Ninja Van has sorting warehouses across Southeast Asia, in Singapore, Myanmar, Malaysia, Philippines, Indonesia, Thailand and Vietnam.

It works with e-commerce firms including Alibaba Group's Lazada, GoTo's Tokopedia for Indonesia, and Sea Group's Shopee. It uses vehicle routing problem algorithms to improve delivery routes.

== Etymology ==
While ninja refers to unconventional, Japanese military forces that is known for stealth and speed, ninja van as a term was coined within the Singapore armed forces to refer to food trucks that were able to appear often in restricted areas during military maneuvers or activities to deliver hot meals.

Generations of national servicemen had noted the ability of these ubiquitous food trucks to seemingly bypass security, and with foreknowledge of exactly when pauses in major military exercises occur and where. Ninja vans were also seen in ROC where the Singapore Armed Forces have a permanent detachment and Exercise Star Light.

== History ==
Ninja Van was founded in 2014 by Singaporeans Lai Chang Wen, Shaun Chong, and Boxian Tan. The firm runs on a hub-and-spoke model, compared to other companies like GOGOX and Lalamove that use a point-to-point model.

In 2019, it delivered an average of one million parcels a day around the ASEAN region.

During the COVID-19 pandemic in Singapore in 2020, Ninja Van saw a three-fold increase in parcel volume in Singapore. In Malaysia, it saw a two-fold increase in shipment volume growth, driven by the growth in social-commerce transactions.

In July 2021, it was reported that Ninja Van was considering an initial public offering in 2022.

In July 2024, they announced a second round of layoffs coming after the first round of layoffs in May 2024.

In September 2024 it was reported in The Straits Times, Singaporean daily newspaper, that it was suspending operations in Vietnam due to unpaid salaries.

== Funding ==
In March 2015, Ninja Van announced a US$2.5 million Series A funding round. The investment was led by Monk's Hill Ventures. In April 2016, Ninja Van announced a US$30 million Series B round.

In January 2018, Ninja Van raised at last US$87 million in its Series C funding. International parcel delivery firm DPDgroup acquired a minority stake in Ninja Van during its Series C funding.

Ninja Van raised US$279 million in its Series D funding round in May 2020 which included backers like France's GeoPost SA and Grab.

In September 2021, Ninja Van announced that it has raised US$578 million in its Series E funding round, led by Alibaba Group, DPDgroup, and B Capital. In March 2023, Lai announced that it is holding off on IPO plans until profitability improves.
