= Eureka Robotics =

Singaporean robotics company

- Type: Private
- Industry: Robotics, machine vision
- Founded: 2018; 8 years ago
- Founders: Pham Quang Cuong; Hung Pham
- Headquarters: Singapore
- Key people: Pham Quang Cuong (CEO)
- Products: Eureka Controller, Eureka 3D Camera, Eureka AI Vision System
- Website: eurekarobotics.com

Eureka Robotics is a Singaporean robotics and machine vision company that develops AI vision systems for bin picking and vision-guided robotics in manufacturing automation. Its systems combine a 3D camera, a controller and software, and are also applied to machine tending and precision assembly tasks. The company was founded in 2018 as a spin-off from Nanyang Technological University (NTU) in Singapore and has offices in Singapore and Tokyo.

== History ==
Eureka Robotics was founded in 2018 by roboticists Pham Quang Cuong and Hung Pham, based on research conducted at Nanyang Technological University. Pham Quang Cuong led the NTU research team that in 2018 demonstrated a robot capable of autonomously assembling an IKEA chair in under nine minutes, a result published in Science Robotics that received international media attention.

The company initially commercialised its research through Archimedes, a robotic system for handling optical lenses and mirrors. It later developed its technology into a hardware and software platform for what it calls "high accuracy, high agility" industrial tasks.

Following a pre-Series A investment led by the University of Tokyo Edge Capital Partners (UTEC), the company opened an office in Tokyo in 2023 to serve Japanese manufacturers. In December 2024, Eureka Robotics raised a US$10.5 million Series A round led by B Capital, with participation from Airbus Ventures, Maruka Corporation, G. K. Goh Ventures, UTEC and ATEQ, to fund expansion in Japan and entry into the United States market.

== Products ==
The company's products include the Eureka Controller, a control system that connects industrial cameras, robots and other devices for vision-guided robotics applications, and the Eureka 3D Camera, an industrial 3D camera that uses AI-based, projector-free 3D reconstruction. The company combines these components with its software in the Eureka AI Vision System, which it markets for vision-based bin picking in manufacturing automation. Its systems are used for applications including bin picking, machine tending, assembly and optics handling by manufacturers including Toyota, Denso and Pratt & Whitney.

== See also ==
- Physical AI
