= B Capital =

American venture capital firm

B Capital Group Management, L.P.
- Type: Private
- Industry: Venture capital
- Founded: 2015; 11 years ago
- Founders: Eduardo Saverin; Raj Ganguly
- Headquarters: Manhattan Beach, Los Angeles County, California, U.S.
- Key people: Howard L. Morgan (Chairman)
- AUM: US$9.0 billion (2026)
- Number of employees: 250+ (2026)
- Website: b.capital

B Capital is an American venture capital firm, headquartered in Manhattan Beach, California. The firm has a strategic partnership with the Boston Consulting Group (BCG).

Outside the United States, B Capital has offices in Doha, Hong Kong and Singapore.

== History ==
B Capital was founded in 2015 by Facebook co-founder Eduardo Saverin and Raj Ganguly. Saverin had worked with Ganguly since 2012 where they met in Singapore due to mutual acquaintances from Harvard University. From inception, the firm took a multinational approach to investing rather than starting locally. While Ganguly oversaw more of the day-to-day management, Saverin focused on investments especially those in Southeast Asia and India.

B Capital partnered with BCG which allowed its portfolio companies access to BCG's advice and clients. BCG as a passive investor in B Capital would only provide consulting advice when founders ask.

In May 2016, B Capital raised more than $143.6 million in its first fund, after having already invested in Ninja Van and Evidation Health.

In 2017, First Round Capital co-founder Howard L. Morgan came out of retirement to become chairman of B Capital.

In April 2021, B Capital expanded its investment scope into China and hired a former SoftBank Vision Fund partner to lead its China team, despite the Chinese government launching a regulatory campaign on technology companies.

In July 2022, B Capital raised $250 million for its first early-stage venture fund, Ascent Fund. Prior to that B Capital had allocated most of its capital toward later-stage companies.

In March 2023, B Capital had raised $500 million for its first healthcare-only fund. In March 2024, B Capital raised $750 million to fund and invest in late stage startups.

As of 2026, the firm has invested $60 million in three startups: industrial robot developer Eureka Robotics, Ninja Van and automation software developer MoEngage.

== See also ==
- Boston Consulting Group
- Eduardo Saverin
