= DTDC =

Indian courier company

DTDC Express Limited
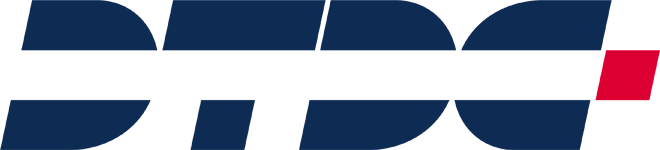
- Trade name: DTDC
- Type: Private
- Industry: Courier
- Founded: 1990; 36 years ago (as DTDC Courier & Cargo Ltd.)
- Founder: Subhasish Chakraborty
- Headquarters: Bengaluru, Karnataka, India
- Area served: Worldwide
- Key people: Subhasish Chakraborty (Chairman and Managing Director); Abhishek Chakraborty (Executive Director)
- Services: Delivery; express mail; third-party logistics
- Revenue: ▲₹2,022 crore (US$210 million) (FY23)
- Net income: ▼₹23 crore (US$2.4 million) (FY23)
- Number of employees: 13,000
- Website: dtdc.com

DTDC Express Limited, trading as DTDC (short for Desk to Desk Courier & Cargo), is an Indian logistics and delivery services company, headquartered in Bengaluru.

== History ==
In 2006 Reliance Capital acquired a 44% stake from co-founder Debasish Chakraborty, who left the company owing to differences with his elder brother. Subhasish Chakraborty retained his 56% stake in the company, while Reliance Capital reduced its shareholding to 40% later that year.

In 2012, DTDC acquired a 52% stake in Eurostar Express of Eurostar Group in the UAE. In April 2013, DTDC acquired 70% of Nikkos Logistics.

In June 2013, French courier company Geopost (owned by La Poste) acquired Reliance Capital's 39.51% stake in DTDC, taking its overall ownership in DTDC to 42%.

In February 2025, DTDC started quick-commerce delivery services, opening its first dark store in Bangalore.

== Sponsorships ==
In January 2003, DTDC became the title sponsor of then NFL club Tollygunge Agragami.

== See also ==
- Courier in India
- Indian Postal Service
