= Asendia =

Delivery company

Asendia Management SAS
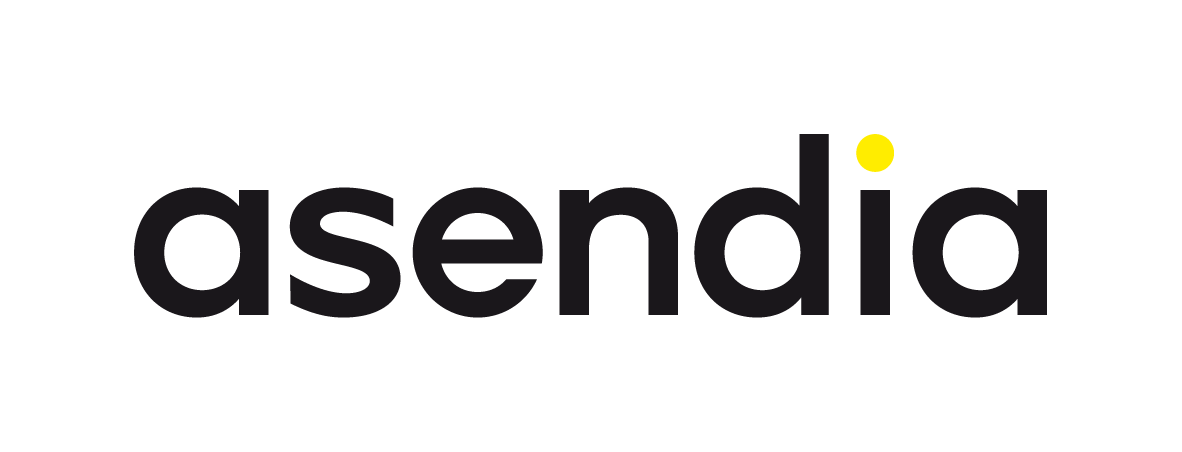
- Type: Société par actions simplifiée (Simplified as joint-stock company)
- Industry: Logistics
- Founded: July 2012
- Founder: La Poste & Swiss Post
- Headquarters: Paris (France), Bern (Switzerland)
- Number of locations: 32 offices in 16 countries
- Area served: Worldwide
- Key people: Marc Pontet (CEO)
- Services: Distance Selling and Press & Publishing; Mail and small goods
- Owner: La Poste & Swiss Post
- Number of employees: c. 1500 (2022)
- Website: asendia.com

Asendia Management SAS is a cross-border delivery company for e-commerce and mail. It was established in 2012 as a joint venture between French La Poste and Swiss Post, with 32 locations across four continents.

== History ==
Asendia became majority shareholder of ESW (formerly eShopWorld) in 2017 and acquired full ownership of the company in 2021, buying the remaining stake from its founder, Thomas Kelly, who continued as ESW's chief executive. ESW, a Dublin-based e-commerce logistics provider, continued to operate as a standalone entity under its existing management.

The company maintains a presence in Europe, Oceania, Asia, and North America through its network of 32 offices across 16 countries, including Australia, Austria, Belgium, China, Denmark, France, Germany, Italy, the Netherlands, Norway, Singapore, Spain, Sweden, Switzerland, the United Kingdom, and the United States of America.
