= Château de Marthon =

Ruined French castle in Marthon, Charente

Coordinates: 45°36′45″N 0°26′44″E

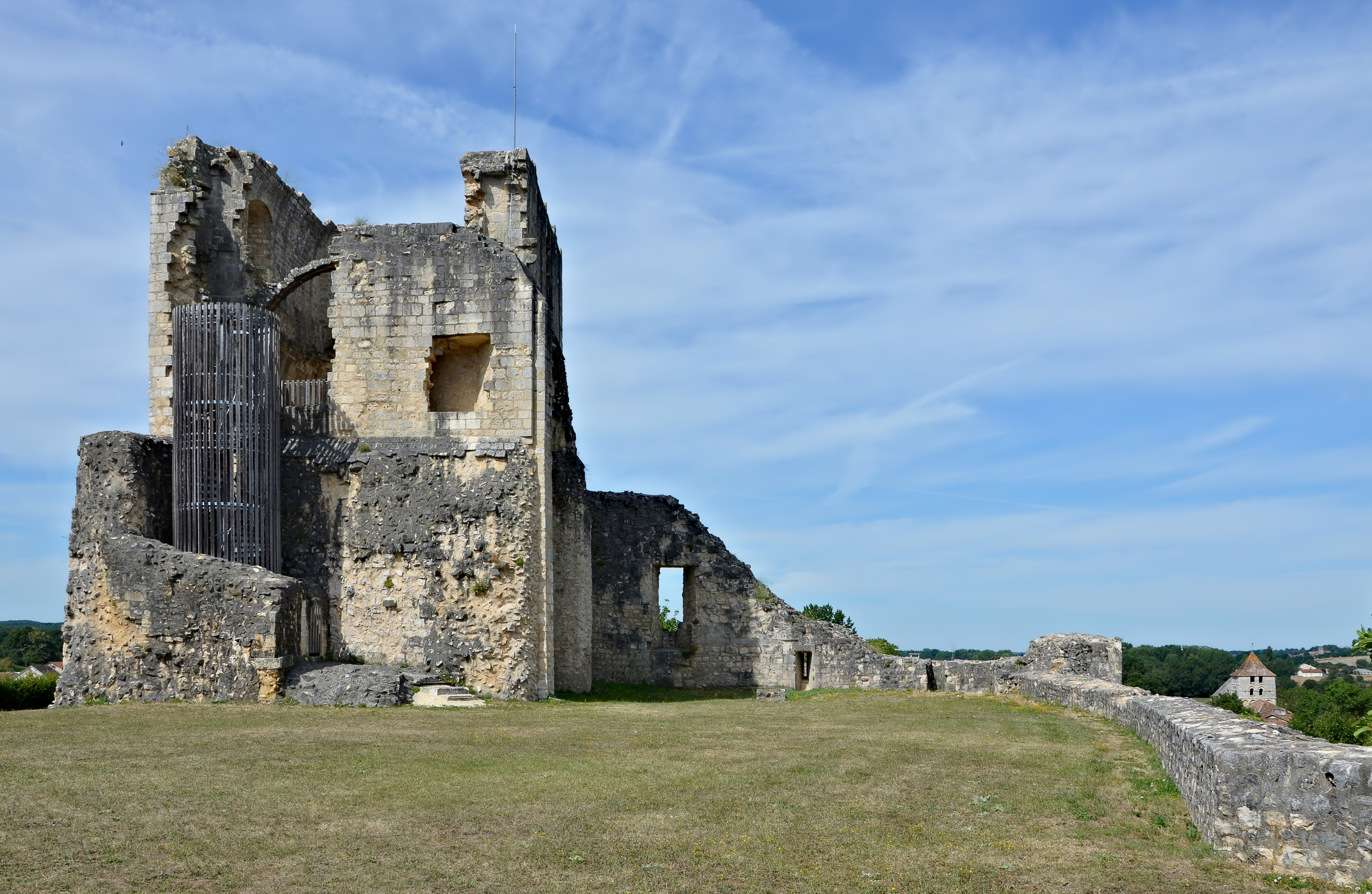
Keep and former castle courtyard

The Château de Marthon is a ruined castle in the commune of Marthon in the Charente département of France. Only the keep remains.

== History ==
The Marthon family was descended from the Montbrons, grandchildren of the count of Angoulême, Audouin II. This seigneury existed from the 10th century.

During the Hundred Years' War, the lords of Marthon remained loyal to the king of France. On the night of 5/6 May 1347, the English surprised the castle and set it on fire, ravaging all of the castellanery.

== Architecture ==
The castle was built as a polygonal enceinte dominated by a square keep in the south-west corner. Its construction dates from the 12th or 13th century. Living accommodation was built against the north face of the tower. A turret has disappeared.

The castle had a Gothic chapel with two floors - the lower served as a shelter for pilgrims and the upper was reserved for the lord.

In 1960, the keep was reduced in height by a metre.

It has been listed since 1928 as a monument historique by the French Ministry of Culture.

== See also ==
- List of castles in France

== Gallery ==
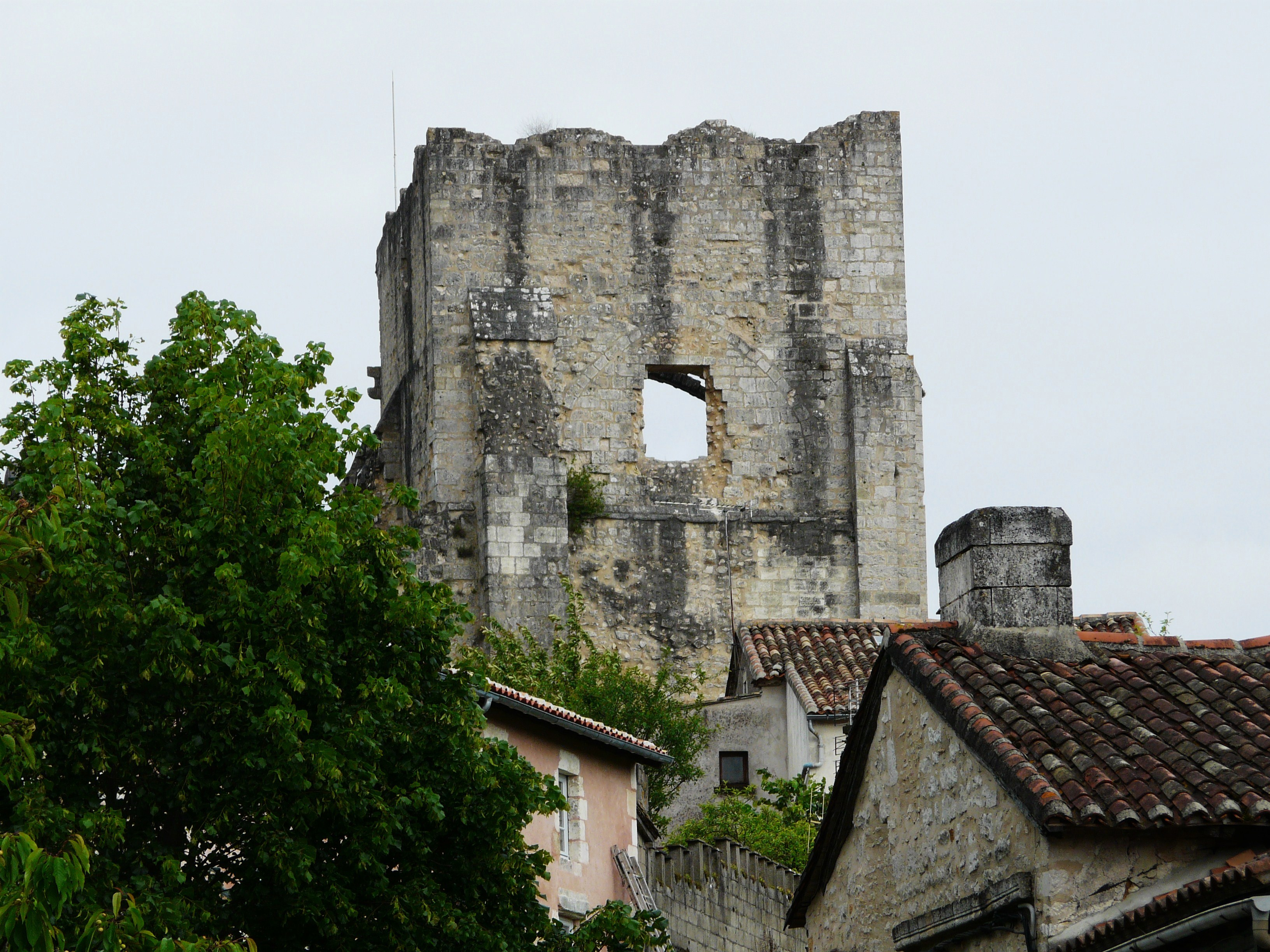
View from the village

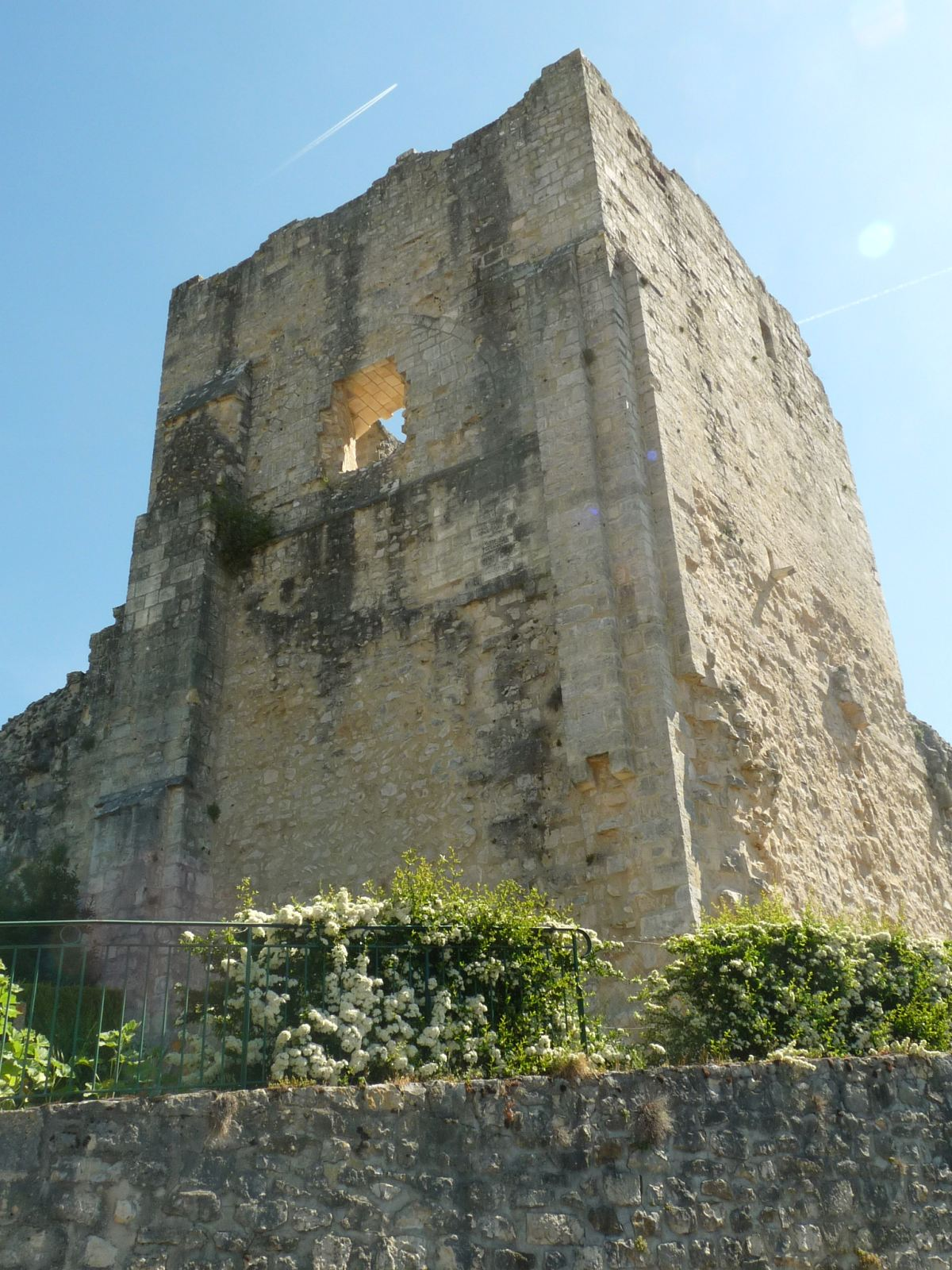

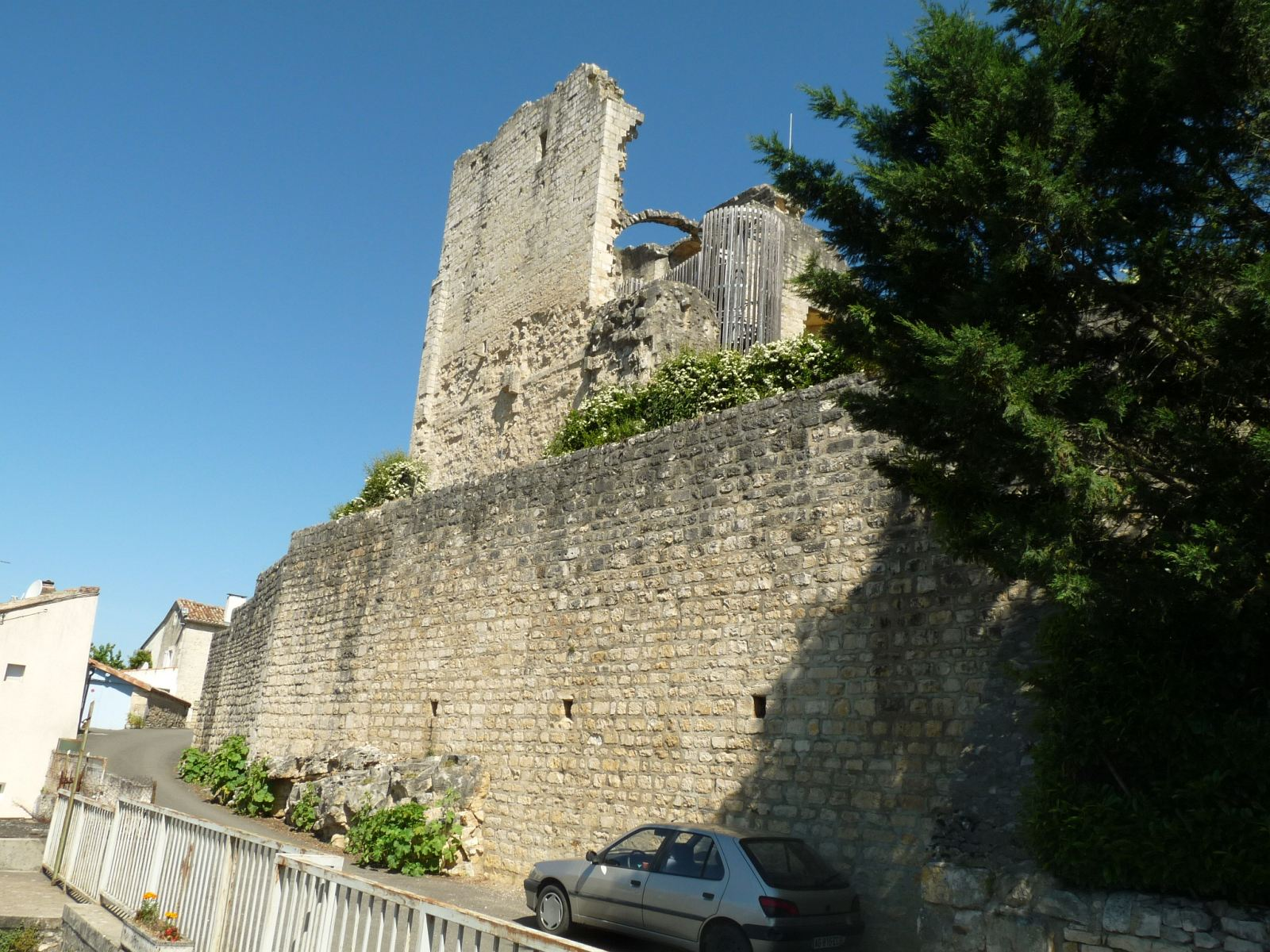
View from south east

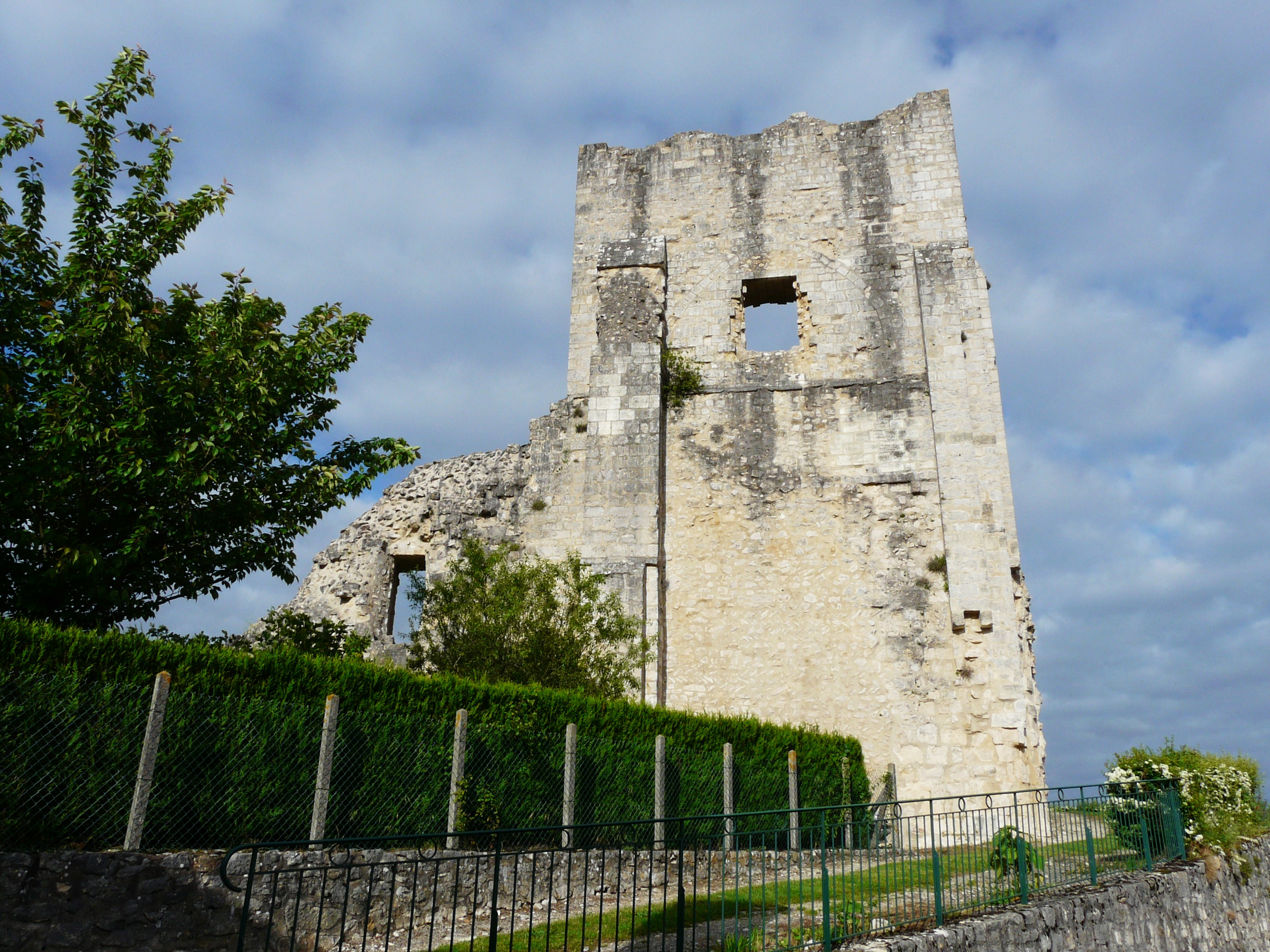
View from north

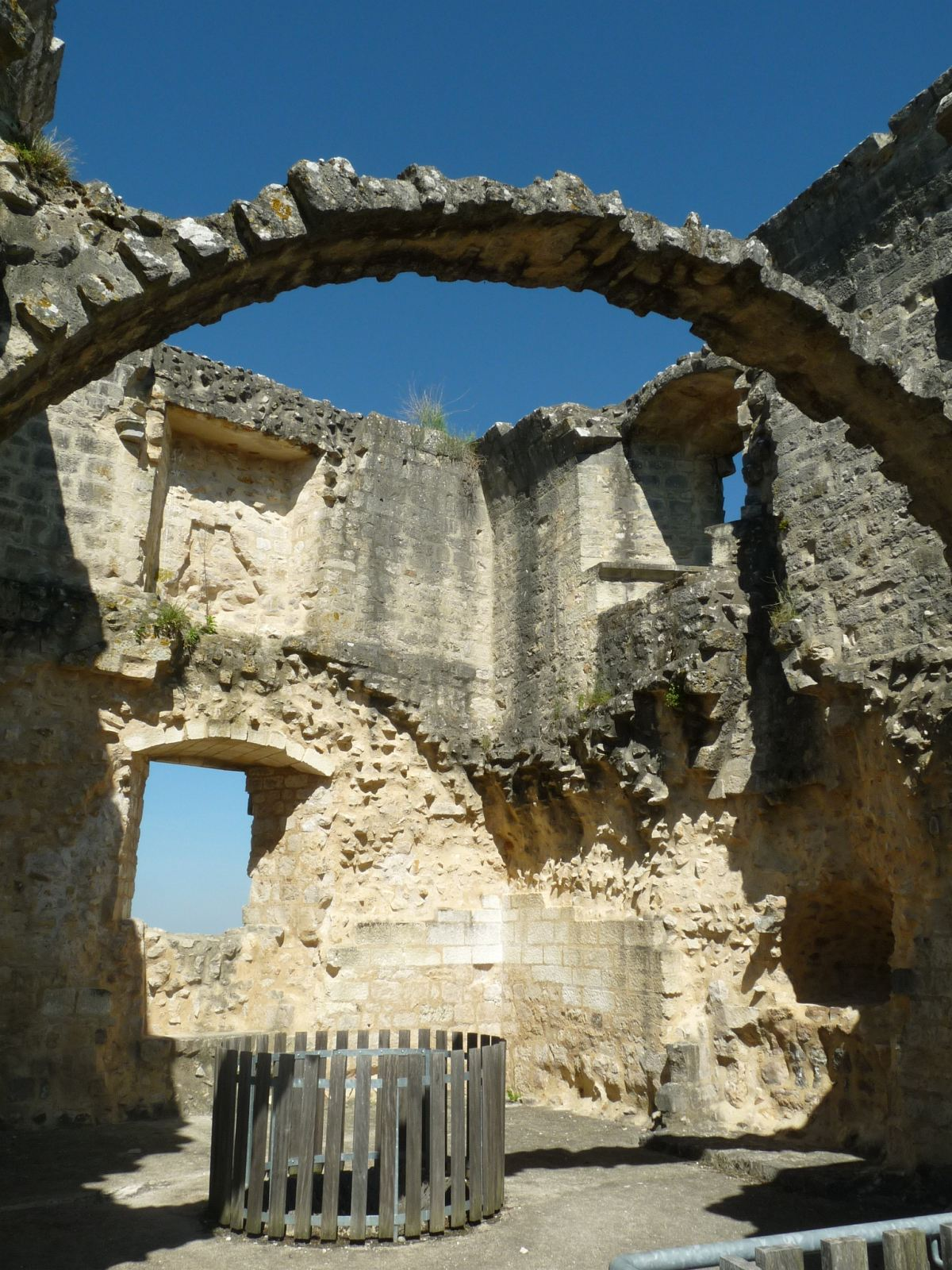
Interior of the keep

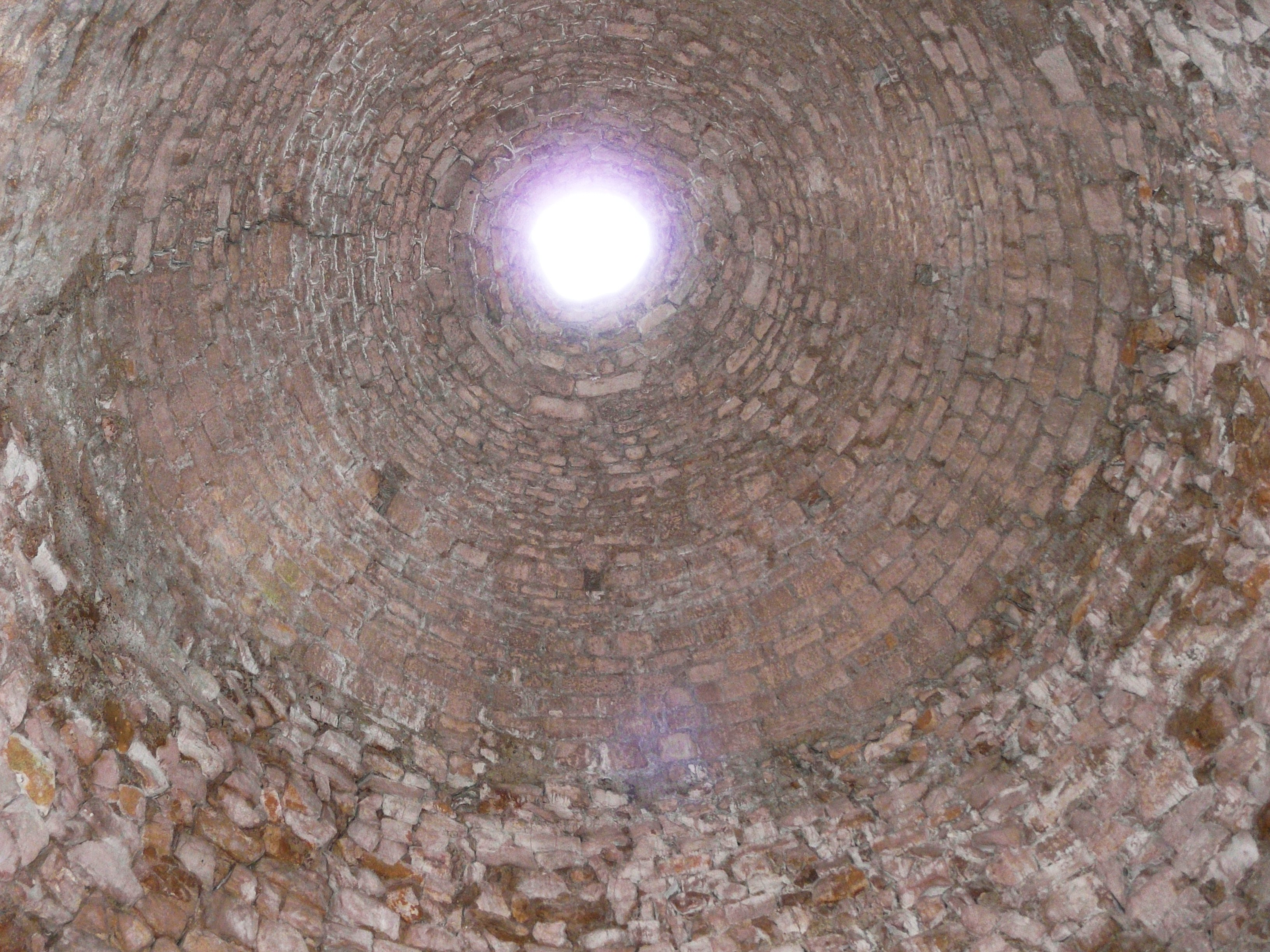
Cupola inside the keep
