= Marthon =

- Commune
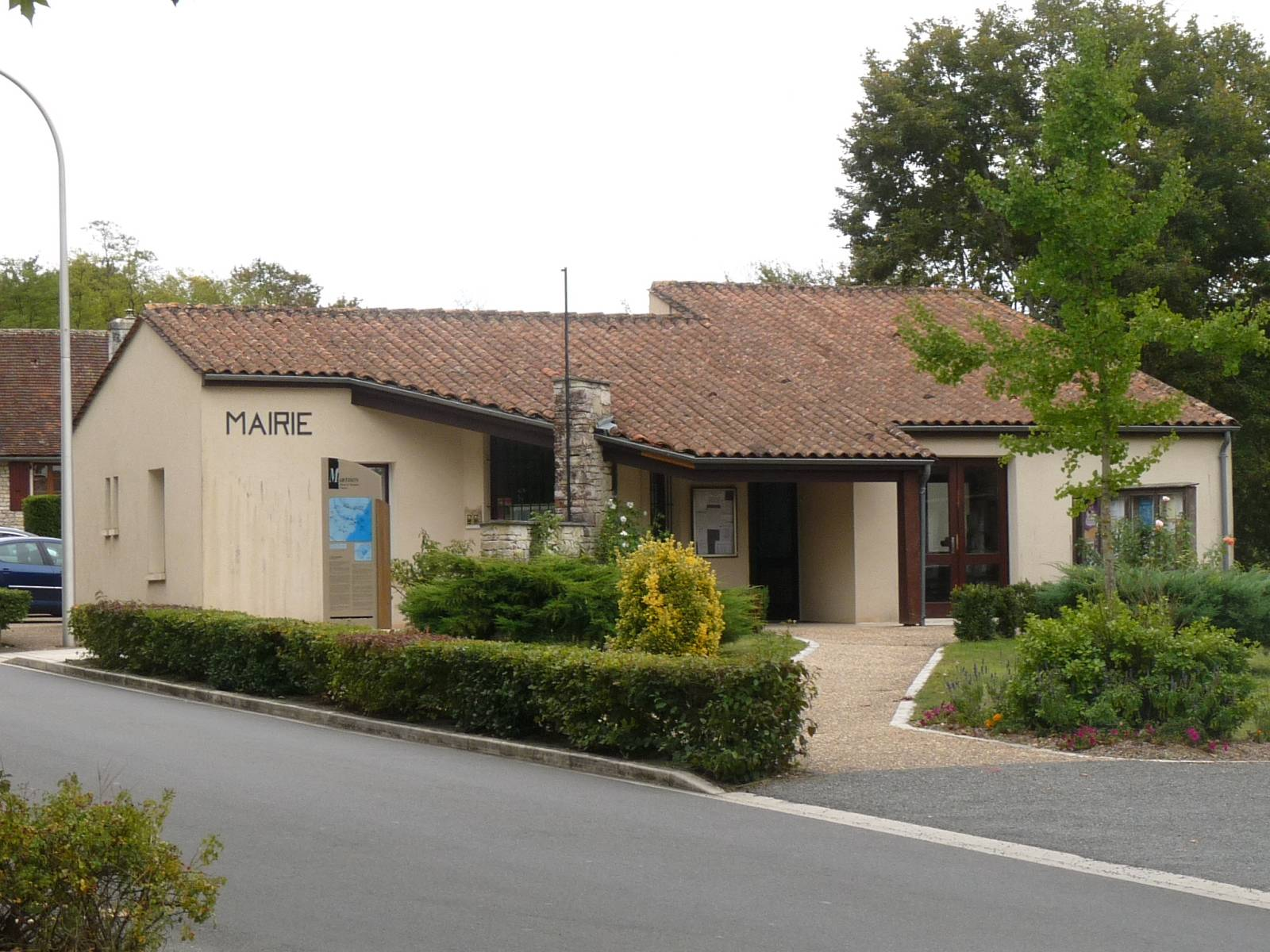
- The town hall in Marthon
- Location of Marthon
- Location within France Location within Nouvelle-Aquitaine
- Coordinates: 45°36′46″N 0°26′43″E
- Country: France
- Region: Nouvelle-Aquitaine
- Department: Charente
- Arrondissement: Angoulême
- Canton: Val de Tardoire

Government
  - Mayor (2020–2026): Patrick Borie
- Area^{1}: 12.82 km^{2} (4.95 sq mi)
- Elevation: 108 m (354 ft)
- Highest elevation: 195 m (640 ft)
- Lowest elevation: 91 m (299 ft)
- Population (2023): 554
  - Density: 43.2/km^{2} (112/sq mi)
- Time zone: UTC+01:00 (CET)
  - Summer (DST): UTC+02:00 (CEST)
- INSEE/Postal code: 16211 /16380
- ^{1} French Land Register data, which excludes lakes, ponds, glaciers > 1 km^{2} (0.386 sq mi or 247 acres) and river estuaries.

Marthon (French pronunciation: [maʁtɔ̃]; Limousin: Marton) is a commune in the Charente department in southwestern France.

== Population ==
Historical population
Year	Pop.	±% p.a.
1968	509	—
1975	554	+1.22%
1982	509	−1.20%
1990	529	+0.48%
1999	556	+0.55%
2007	597	+0.89%
2012	586	−0.37%
2017	559	−0.94%
2023	554	−0.15%
Source: INSEE

== See also ==
- Château de Marthon - castle ruins
- Communes of the Charente department
