= La Banque postale =

French postal bank

- Type: Société anonyme
- Industry: Postal banking
- Founded: 9 December 1998 as La Poste Financial Services; 1 January 2006 as La Banque Postale
- Headquarters: 115 rue de Sèvres; Paris, France
- Key people: Philippe Heim (Chairman of the Management Board)
- Revenue: ▲€7.553 billion (2024)
- Operating income: ▲€2.439 billion (2024)
- Net income: ▲€1.186 billion (2024)
- Total assets: ▼€727 billion (Q3 2025)
- Total equity: ▼€20.5 billion (2024)
- Owner: La Poste
- Number of employees: 32,000 (2024)
- Parent: La Poste
- Subsidiaries: CNP Assurances
- Website: labanquepostale.com

La Banque postale (French pronunciation: [la bɑ̃k pɔstal], lit. 'The Postal Bank') is a French postal bank, created on 1 January 2006 as a subsidiary of La Poste, the national postal service.

It has been designated as a Significant Institution since the entry into force of European Banking Supervision in late 2014, and as a consequence is directly supervised by the European Central Bank.

== Overview ==
The bank provides service to over 10.8 million active private customers, as well as more than 400,000 customers businesses, professionals, social economy actors and local public sector bodies. The company is considered to be one of the leading lenders to local authorities, maintaining an expansive branch network in France consisting of over 17,000 contact points and 7,700 post offices. It is the only bank in France charged with the responsibility to implement banking services to the public under a legislative initiative to modernize the French economy in 2008. La Banque postale reports a net income of €5.602 billion, -2.5% relative to 2015.

== History ==
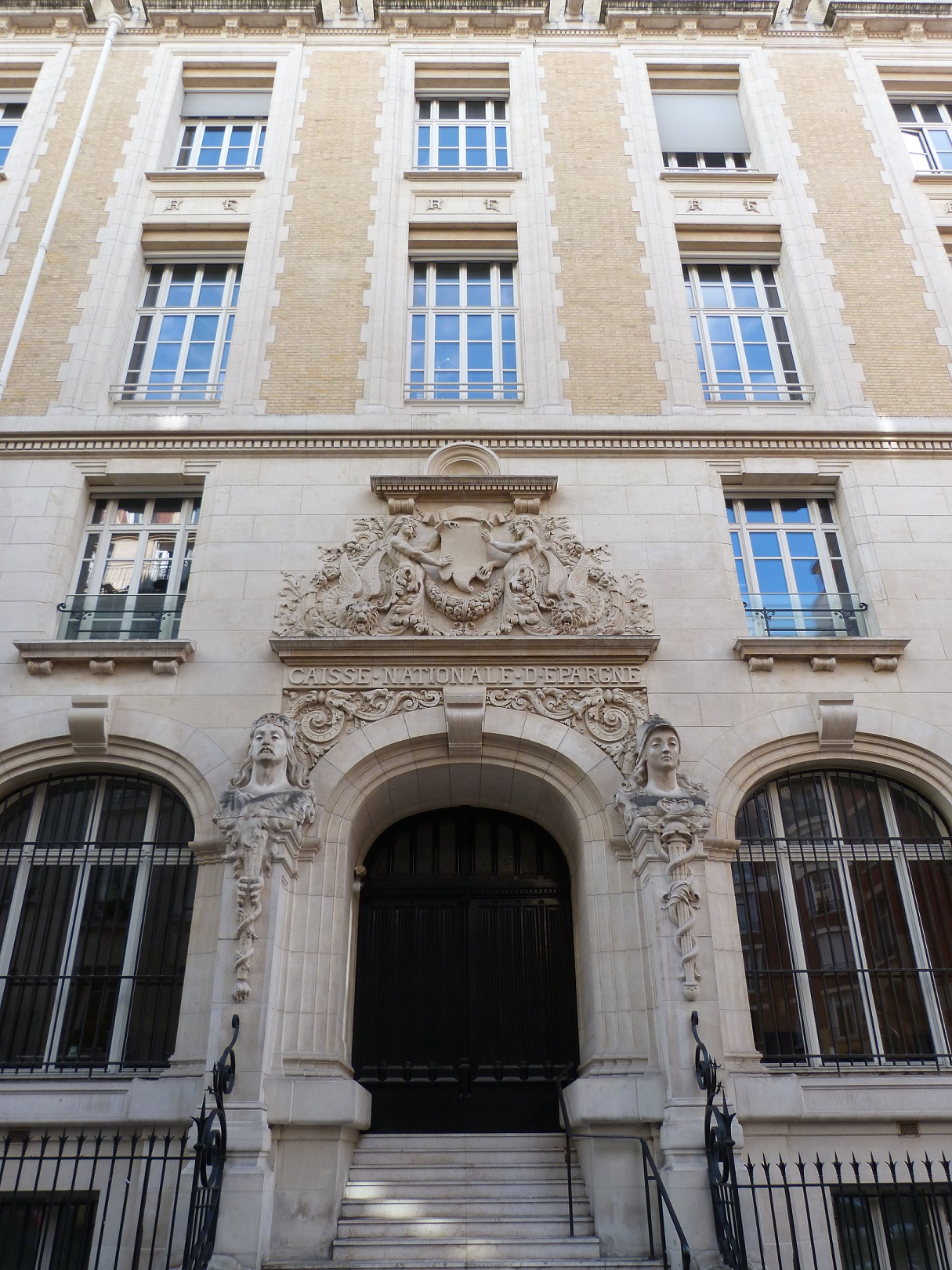
Former seat of the Caisse Nationale d'Epargne (rue Saint-Romain, Paris), a predecessor to La Banque Postale

In 1875, post offices were authorized to offer savings products.

In 1881 the French state established the Caisse Nationale d'Épargne (CNE) to manage retail savings collected through the French network of post offices. The CNE thus competed for the collection of small retail savings with the local Caisses d'Épargne (also known in that context as Caisses d'épargne ordinaires) which were private-sector entities.

The Law of January 7, 1918, introduced postal current accounts and checks in France.

In 1988, Sogéposte, the financial subsidiary of La Poste and the Caisse des Dépôts et Consignations, was established.

In 2012, the company set out to be a benchmark partner for the public sector, focusing on working with all regional stakeholders. By 2015, La Banque postale's commitments had been realized, now being recognized as the reference bank for local authorities concerning financing and banking services, as well for stakeholders dealing with social housing, local institutions, public health-care establishments and semi-public corporations.

== Controversy ==
In 2010 the French government's Autorité de la concurrence (the department in charge of regulating competition) fined eleven banks, including La Banque postale, the sum of €384.9 million for colluding to charge unjustified fees on check processing, especially for extra fees charged during the transition from paper check transfer to "Exchanges Check-Image" electronic transfer.

== Climate policy ==
In October 2021, the bank announced that it would no longer provide financial services to oil and gas companies, invest in companies active in the sector and finance any related projects. It additionally presented a plan to completely exit the oil and gas industries by 2030, becoming the first bank to make such a pledge. The policy has been described as an "historic precedent" in the banking sector by environmental organisations such as Reclaim Finance, Friends of the Earth France and Oxfam France.

== See also ==
- List of banks in France
- List of banks in the euro area
