= Chronopost =

Delivery service

Chronopost International, a member of the La Poste group, provides express shipping and delivery service both domestically (in France) and internationally.

Domestic services comprise mostly next-day services, with some variation depending on the exact delivery locations, for packages and documents weighing up to 30 kilograms (66 lb).

International services vary much more by location, due to the increased distance between origin and destination and lack of a substantial distribution system at the destination. As is the case with domestic shipments, most services provide delivery for items weighing no more than 30 kg.

The Chrono Mission product line, available for both domestic and international shipments, provides for the delivery of items weighing up to 1.4 tonnes (3080 lb) and up to 14 m^{3} (490 ft³) in size.

Chronopost has international offices in Morocco and Ivory Coast.

For some of the delivery of packages in the United States, Chronopost express packages are delivered by FedEx as International Priority.

== History ==
In 2018, Chronopost partnered with Japan's Yamato Holdings for refrigerated transport between France and Japan, and signed an agreement with China's SF Express to enhance service and transit times to China. The company also acquired Groupe ALP and its subsidiaries, expanding its temperature-controlled transport services. In 2019, Chronopost announced that Paris would be fully serviced by clean vehicles.
