= CNP Assurances =

French insurance company

CNP Assurances S.A.
- Type: Subsidiary (Société Anonyme)
- ISIN: FR0000120222
- Industry: Financial services
- Founded: 1959; 67 years ago
- Headquarters: Paris, France
- Area served: Europe, South America
- Key people: Stéphane Dedeyan (CEO) Véronique Weill (Chairwoman)
- Services: Life insurance, asset management, pensions
- Revenue: €37.4 billion (2024)
- Net income: €1.58 billion (2024)
- Total equity: €21 billion (2024)
- Number of employees: 8,479 (2024)
- Parent: La Banque postale
- Website: www.cnp.fr/en

CNP Assurances S.A. is a multinational French insurance company based in Paris, France. Its name, CNP, stands for Caisse Nationale de Prévoyance. It is the leader in creditor insurance and the second-largest in life insurance in France, as well as one of the largest insurers in Europe and Brazil. A regular on the Fortune Global 500 list, the company's global operations covered 36 million policyholders in personal risk and protection and 13 million in savings and pensions at the end of 2024.

In France, CNP Assurances distributes its products through La Banque Postale and the Caisses d'Epargne, as well as its own CNP Trésor network. In Brazil, its second-largest market, the group's partner is Caixa Econômica Federal.

The company originated in 1959 within the framework of the French public financial institution, Caisse des Dépôts et Consignations (CDC). Following a 1992 privatization law, it operated for many years as a publicly listed company with a consortium of public-sector shareholders, including CDC, La Banque Postale, and Groupe BPCE. In 2022, La Banque Postale finalized a takeover bid, acquiring 100% of the company's shares. As a result, CNP Assurances was delisted from the Euronext Paris stock exchange and now operates as a wholly-owned subsidiary of La Banque Postale.

== History ==
The origins of CNP Assurances date back to the mid-19th century, with the creation of three funds within the Caisse des Dépôts: the Caisse nationale d'assurance en cas de décès (National Death Insurance Fund) in 1868, the Caisse de retraite pour la vieillesse (Retirement Fund for the Elderly) in 1850, and the Caisse nationale d'assurance en cas d'accident (National Accident Insurance Fund) in 1868.

The first two funds merged in 1949 to form the Caisse nationale d'assurance sur la vie (National Life Insurance Fund), which itself merged ten years later with the Caisse d’assurance en cas d’accident to create the Caisse nationale de prévoyance (National Providence Fund) in 1959.

In 1992, CNP became a public limited company (société anonyme) and changed its name.

CNP Assurances acquired Compania de Seguros de Vida in Argentina in 1995.

It is now called CNP Assurances and was listed on the stock exchange in 1998.

It then established itself in Portugal in 1999, and then in Brazil in 2001, where it holds 51.75% of Caixa Seguradora. It has been present in Italy since 2005 and in Spain since 2006. CNP Assurances is also present in Ireland, Cyprus, and Greece through its subsidiaries.

In December 2014, CNP sold its 50% stake in CNP Barclays Vida Y Pensiones to Barclays for 453 million euros.

In 2018, CNP Assurances was in discussions with Caixa Seguridade (Brazil) with a view to concluding a new distribution agreement, which was ratified in September 2018.

In August 2018, the Minister of Economy and Finance, Bruno Le Maire, formalized the merger between Banque Postale and CNP Assurances, to allow La Poste to develop in banking and insurance.

On 15 November 2018, Antoine Lissowski was appointed CEO of CNP Assurances. Previously Deputy CEO and Chief Financial Officer, he had been serving as interim head of CNP since September 2018. He succeeds Frédéric Lavenir.

On 4 March 2020, CNP Assurances' shareholding was modified as part of a public financial holding project, following which the company became primarily owned by La Banque Postale (62.13%). The remainder of the shareholding was divided between BPCE (16.11%) and the free float (21.76%).

In August 2020, Véronique Weill was appointed chairwoman of CNP Assurances by the board of directors.

In April 2021, Stéphane Dedeyan was appointed CEO of CNP Assurances, replacing Antoine Lissowski.

On 16 December 2021, La Banque Postale announced that it had acquired the entire stake held by BPCE. Following a takeover bid and then a mandatory buyout of the company's shares not yet held by the bank, on June 3 and 20, 2022, respectively, La Banque Postale acquired the remaining 21.1%, delisting the CNP Assurances share from the market.

In 2022, CNP Assurances concluded a record year with a net profit of 1.94 billion euros.

In January 2024, Marie-Aude Thépaut was appointed CEO of CNP Assurances, replacing Stéphane Dedeyan.

In July 2024, CNP Assurances sold its subsidiary operating in Greece and Cyprus (CNP Cyprus Insurance Holdings) to the Cypriot bank Hellenic Bank. In June 2025, CNP Assurances finalized the sale of its stake (51%) in the joint venture CNP UniCredit Vita to UniCredit for 619 million euros.

== Partners ==
In France, CNP Assurances' products are distributed by La Banque Postale and the BPCE group (Banques Populaires and Caisses d’Epargne), under long-term distribution agreements, until 2036 and 2030 respectively. These two historical partners were also shareholders of CNP Assurances until December 16, 2021, when La Banque Postale acquired the stake held by BPCE.

Internationally, CNP Assurances partners in joint ventures with major banks in their markets: Caixa Econômica Federal in Brazil, UniCredit in Italy, and Santander Consumer Finance in 11 European countries.
