= Mandaluyong riding-in-tandem ordinance =

Motorcycle Riding-in-Tandem Ordinance

Mandaluyong City Council
- Long title: Ordinance Regulating Motorcycle Riding-in-Tandem in Mandaluyong City
- Citation: Ordinance No. 550
- Territorial extent: Mandaluyong
- Enacted: August 13, 2014
- Signed by: Mayor Benhur Abalos
- Effective: September 4, 2014

Amended by
- Ordinance No. 595 S-2015; Ordinance No. 694 S-2018
- Status: Halted

The Motorcycle Riding-in-Tandem Ordinance is an ordinance enacted by the City Council (Sangguniang Panlungsod) of Mandaluyong, a city in Metro Manila, Philippines.

It was enacted as a counter-measure against snatch thievery and other crimes by restricting motorcycle pillion riding, which is colloquially known as "riding in tandem" in the Philippines. Male back riders with certain exceptions is penalized by the city government.

== Legislative history ==
The Motorcycle Riding-in-Tandem Ordinance of Mandaluyong or Ordinance No. 550 was signed into law by Mayor Benhur Abalos on August 13, 2014. According to Abalos, the ordinance is patterned after similar measures in Colombia, particularly in Medellín.

It was touted as an anti-crime legislation by regulating pillion riding or "riding in tandem". It was proposed under the measure that two males who are not relatives would not be allowed to ride a motorcycle together.

The original draft required every rider regardless of gender to provide proof, such as identity documents, establishing familial ties. The provision on requiring to provide proof was changed to only apply to males.

Ordinance No. 550 was intended to last only for six months which is considered as a pilot run for this policy. Ordinance Nos. 595 (2015) and 694 (2018) were later passed to extend the riding-in-tandem policy.

== Ordinance ==
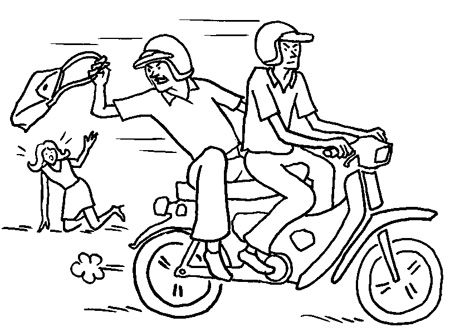
Illustration of two men riding-in-tandem, committing snatch theft against a woman.

The law regulated pillion riding or "riding in tandem" motorcycle travelling. The law penalized adult male back riders who are not a first-degree relative to the front rider. Motorcycle riders are advised to bring identity documents as proof of familial ties in case of apprehension.

Riding in tandem setup
Back rider (pillion rider)	Legality
Male	Illegal
Male (first-degree relative of rider)	Legal
Child (7–10 years of age)	Legal
Female	Legal

People from the Philippine National Police Tactical and Mobile Unit assigned and detailed in Mandaluyong are also exempted from the ordinance's restrictions.

Penalty under the riding-in-tandem policy
Offense	Penalty
1st offense	₱1,000 fine
2nd offense	₱2,000 fine
3rd offense	₱3,000 fine
4th offense	₱3,000 fine and 3 months imprisonment

== Implementation ==
The ordinance's implementation began on September 4, 2014. The initial implementation or the "pilot-run" lasted for six months. The Philippine National Police's (PNP) Highway Patrol Group supported the measure. Motorcycle groups such as the Motorcycle Development Program Participants Association and Motorcycle Rights Organization, meanwhile opposed the ordinance saying that increased police visibility and more efficient checkpoints is the approach that should be done to combat motorcycle related crimes. The ordinance was labeled as sexist by its detractors.

No successful riding-in-tandem crime was committed until December 2014 when two men sharing a motorcycle snatched a woman's bag at Maysilo Circle.

The pilot run ended in March 2015. The riding-in-tandem policy was extended by three years through the passage of Ordinance No. 595. Ordinance No. 694 was passed in 2018 after the expiry of Ordinance No. 595.

In September 2019, the PNP attributed the ordinance as one of the causes for lowered crime rate in Mandaluyong.

== Legal challenge ==
Shortly after the implementation of the ordinance, the Motorcycle Rights Organization has expressed willingness to take its issues with the ordinance to court.

Dino de Leon, filed a case before the Mandaluyong Regional Trial Court (RTC) Branch 59 in July 2019 aiming to have Mandaluyong's riding-in-tandem ordinance as unconstitutional and discriminatory towards males. De Leon, a public interest lawyer, was apprehended and fined under the ordinance while riding a motorcycle taxi operating under hailing app Angkas near a shopping mall at the Ortigas Center on March 7, 2019.

The RTC dismissed the case on July 1, 2020 ruling that the city government did not commit grave abuse of discretion. The case was referred to the Court of Appeals (CA) which disagreed with the RTC ruling. In October 2021, the CA found the ordinance "is an oppressive measure that goes beyond what is reasonably necessary for the accomplishment of the purpose." and that there "no proof that male backriders are more susceptible to commit crimes as opposed to female backriders". It also ruled that it violates the rule on equal protection as it finds the ordinance as "discriminatory both as to gender and as to the use of motorcycles as a mode of transportation and dependent on broad generalizations."

The Mandaluyong city government wanted to rule the case as moot since prevailing community quarantine measures due to the COVID-19 pandemic bares backriders anyway. The CA pointed out that the non-implementation of the ordinance is a temporary one.

In May 2023, the CA reaffirmed its earlier ruling and denied the motion for reconsideration filed by the Mandaluyong government.

The ruling covered Ordinance No. 550 S-2014 and amending ordinances Nos. 595 S-2015, and 694 S-2018

De Leon urged Mandaluyong to refund the ₱2,000 fine collected from around 100,000 offending riders under the contested ordinance.

== Similar ordinances elsewhere in the Philippines ==
In 2015, the municipality of Bangued in Abra passed a riding in tandem ordinance patterned after Mandaluyong's. During that same year, Bacoor introduced their own "Anti Riding-in-Tandem Ordinance," which imposed fines ranging from ₱3,000 for the initial offense to ₱5,000, along with a maximum imprisonment of 6 months for the third offense. In 2017, Bacolod implemented an ordinance that prohibited motorcycle drivers and their back riders from riding together on any day between 9 p.m. and 4 a.m.

In 2018, a draft bill on riding on tandem was filed in the city council of Caloocan.
