= Motorcycle taxi =

Form of transport

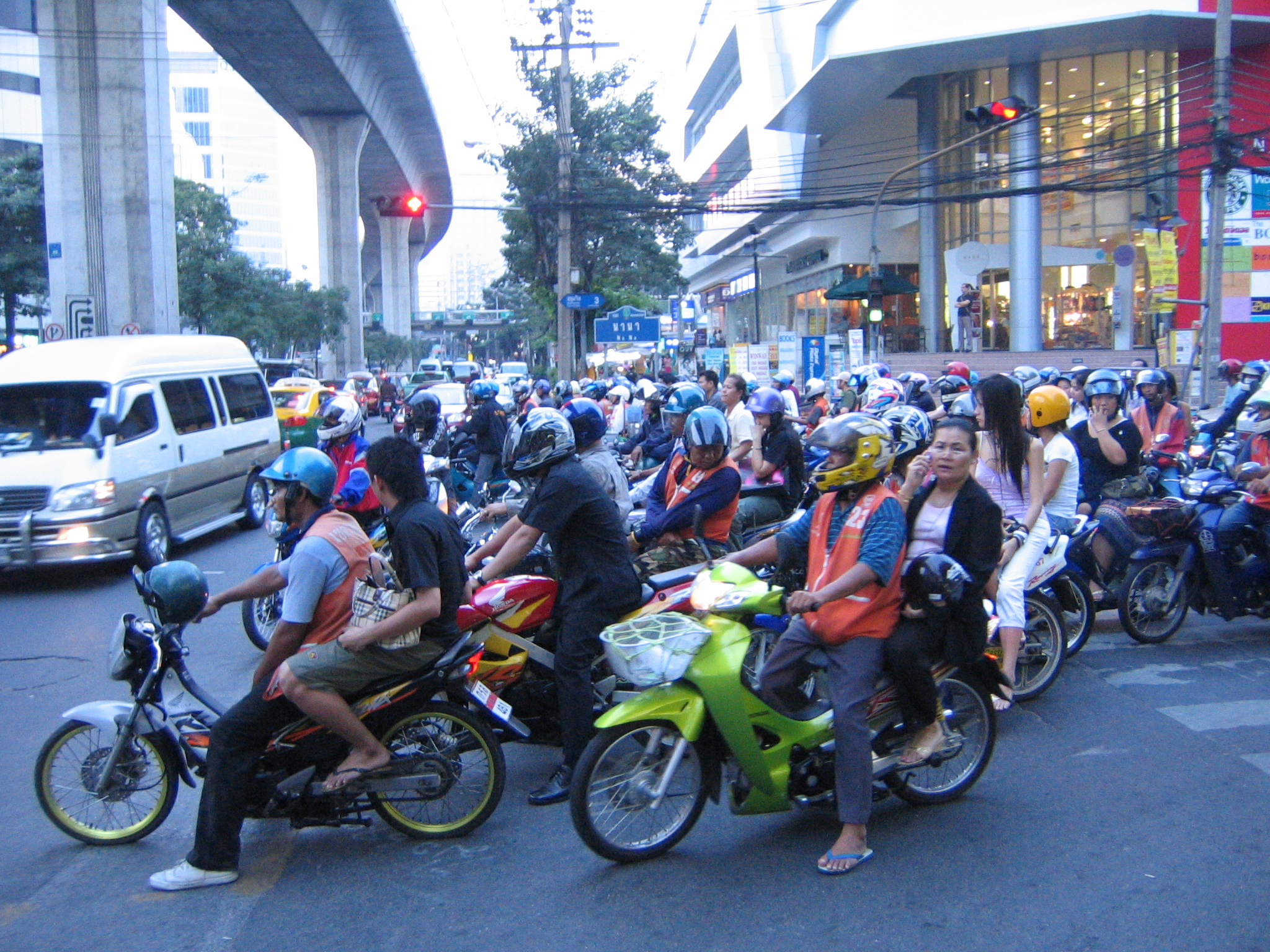
Drivers of motorcycle taxis in Bangkok wear orange vests.

A motorcycle taxi or bike taxi, is a licensed form of transport in some countries. The taxi typically carries one passenger, who "rides pillion" behind the motorcycle operator. Multiple passengers are common in some countries.

== Brazil ==
According to some sources, motorcycle taxi service in Brazil began in 1994, in Crateús, in the state of Ceará, when an employee of the Bank of Brazil bought 10 bikes for rent, for the transport of people. Other sources state that it started in Bauru, São Paulo, in 1996, when an unemployed biker hung a banner across the road to the city, reading "help a biker racing to 1.00 real." Today, almost all Brazilian cities have motorcycle taxi services. Recently, they have appeared in poorer and less urban areas, where young people increasingly support themselves by driving them.

Typically, the fare is a flat fee, regardless of the distance traveled. However, the charge may vary according to the time of day or day of the week, or increase for distances that are greater than usual.

Licensing requirements for motorcycle taxis vary by municipality. Small towns tend not to regulate them at all, while in larger cities, they are regulated in much the same way as taxicabs. In July 2009, the Brazilian Senate approved standards for motorcycle taxi drivers and motorcycle couriers. They must be at least 21 years old, have held a Category A drivers licence for at least two years, and have attended a training course.

== Cambodia ==
In Phnom Penh and other cities in Cambodia, motorcycle taxis are widely available as a form of low-cost public transport. Motorcycle taxi drivers, who are almost exclusively male, are called motodops (Khmer: ម៉ូតូឌុប). They tend to stay outside major tourist attractions, office buildings, public markets, and near the corners of residential streets. There is no regulated system of training or bike maintenance and no common uniform, so mutual transportation is sometimes informally solicited by motorcyclists. Fares for motorcycle taxis in Phnom Penh typically range from 1500-4000 riel for a trip through town or US$6-$8 per day, although prices can be higher for multiple passengers or during nighttime.

== Cameroon ==
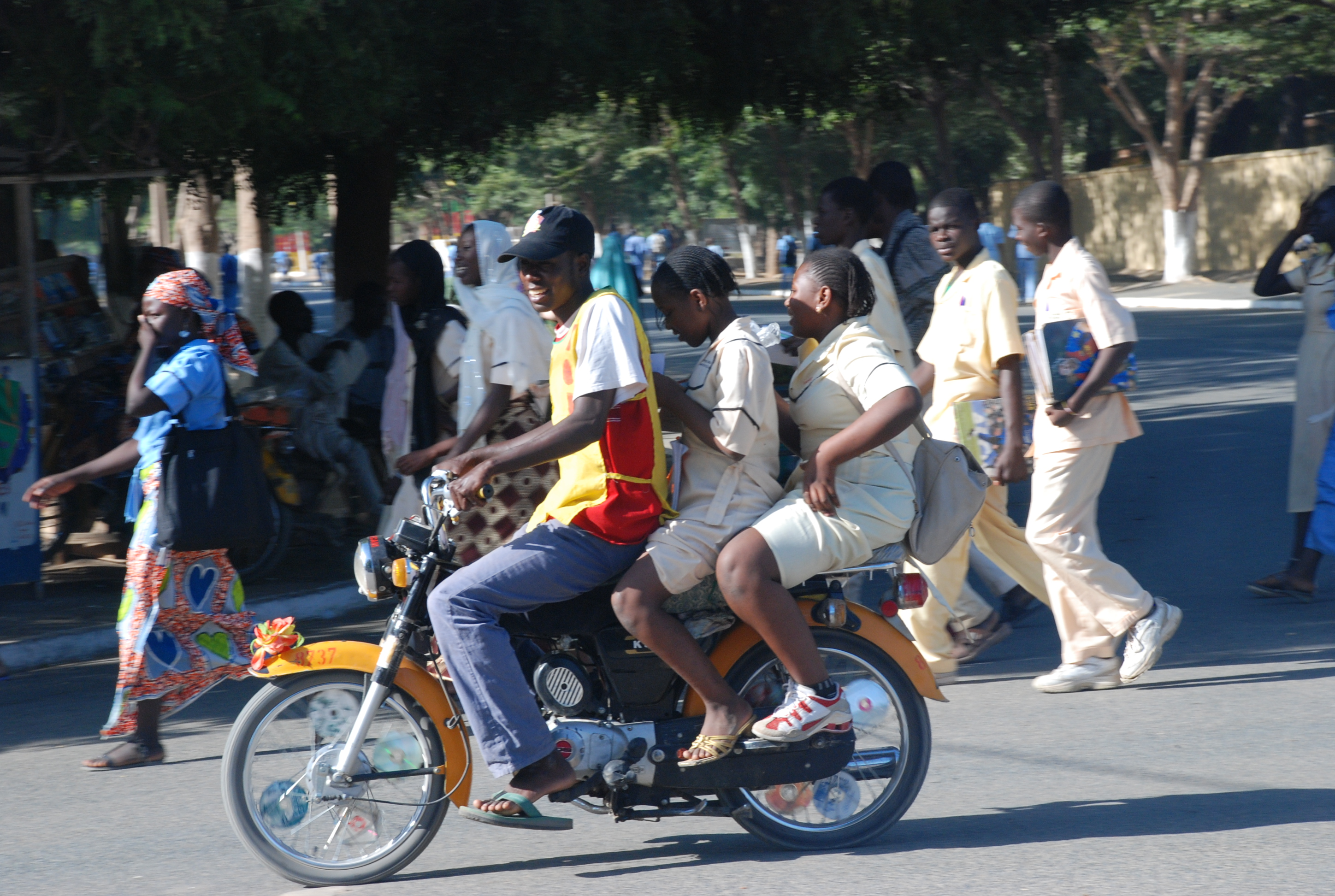
A motorbike taxi in Maroua carrying two passengers

Motorcycle taxis are also the most common form of transportation in Maroua, Cameroon. Multiple passengers are carried on most trips; as many as four children are sometimes carried on a single motorcycle. Helmets are rarely used, but the traffic and speed are moderate in the city. Short distances cost about 200 francs, less than US$1.

== China ==
In mainland China, motorcycle taxi service can be traced back to the late 1980s and early 1990s. There are currently motorcycle taxis throughout China, including in Beijing, Shanghai, and Guangzhou. They are popular primarily due to their low cost: the fare for short trips is just 5 yuan (less than US$1) per person.

== India ==
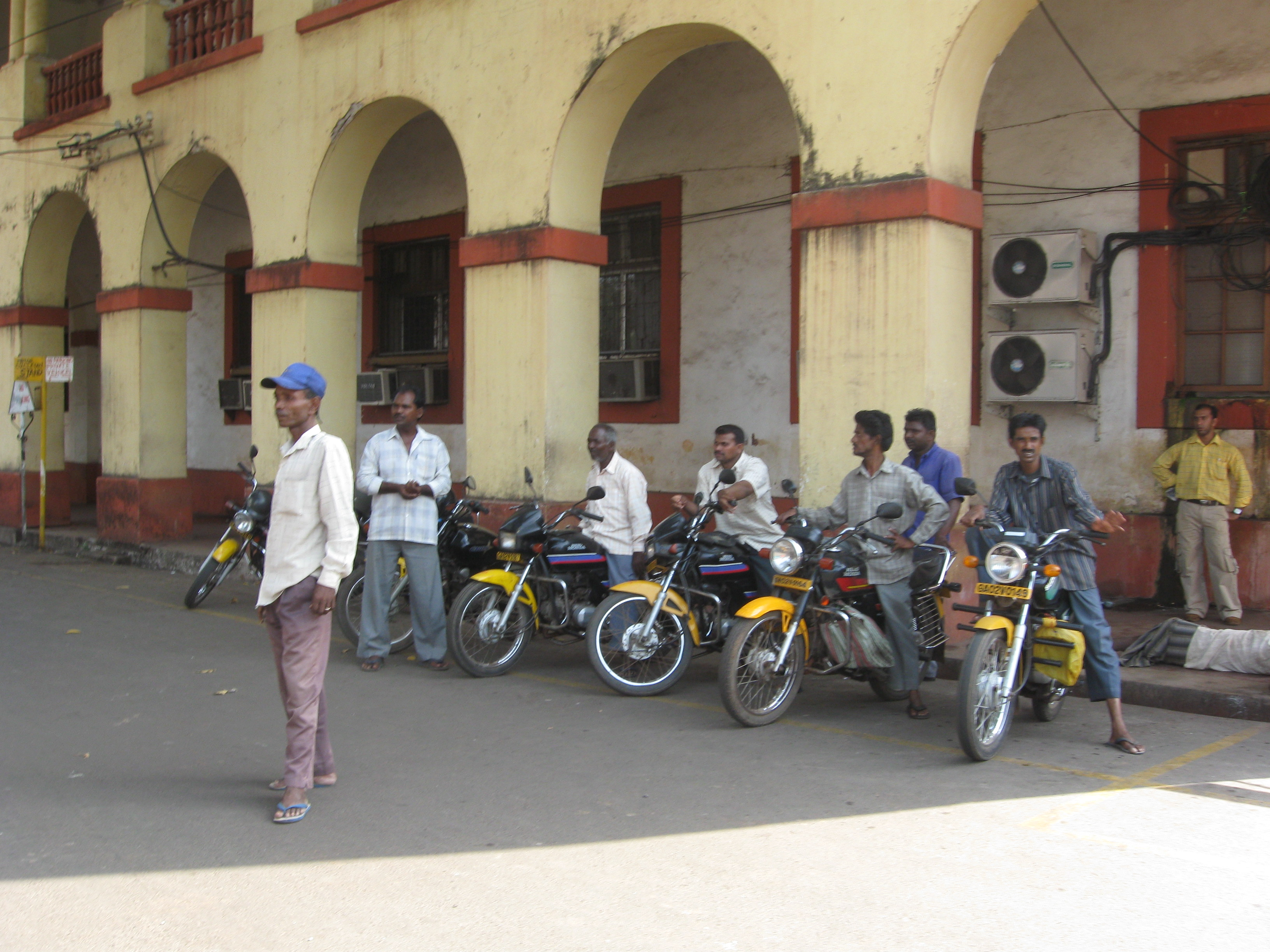
Pilots wait for customers at a motorcycle taxi stand in Vasco da Gama, Goa

In Goa, India, motorcycle taxis are required to be licensed. Driven by men called pilots, they are much cheaper than other taxis, although a passenger can only carry a backpack as luggage. In some parts of the state, motorcycle drivers are legally required to wear helmets, but any passengers riding pillion are not. Motorcycle taxis can usually be identified by their distinctive yellow and black colours. There is a practice to fix the fare in advance, and trips are not metered.

In last few years, a few companies such as Rapido, Uber Moto and Ola Bike Taxi have come up in multiple cities in India providing bike taxi services. With the Central Government's rule of allowing two-wheelers as legal and commercial vehicles and 8 states already legalized the same, it has become easier for the companies to design a working framework to provide easy and comfortable commute to the people.

== Indonesia ==
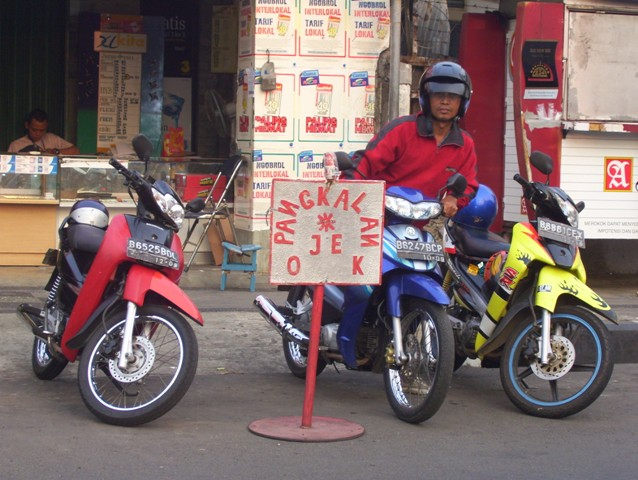
Motorcycle taxis in Indonesia

Gojek Motorcycle taxis, a variation of Ojek, the unlicensed transport in Indonesia found in most areas of the country, is a licensed last-mile ride hailing motor taxi in Indonesia where traffic jams commonly hinder other forms of transport, to rural areas inaccessible by four-wheeled vehicles. Because of the traffic, ojek are often the fastest form of transport, especially in big urban areas such as Jakarta, Surabaya, or Medan. Many people choose them over taxicabs, which are safer, but slower and more expensive. Other ride hailing apps are the Grab which along with Gojek dominates the market, other ride-hailing apps like InDrive and Maxim also exist.

Many ojek drivers either own their vehicles or are buying them on credit, although in some areas, stolen motorcycles are common. The widespread availability of cheap motorcycles made by Honda, Yamaha, and Suzuki or Chinese brands, as well as credit schemes with which to purchase these, have resulted in the rapid growth of ojek. The ease with which driver's licences can be obtained has also been a contributing factor.

Before the trip begins, the passenger usually haggles with the driver over the fare, which generally ranges from 5,000 to 10,000 rupiah (about US$0.50 to US$1.00) for short trips, longer trips will be more expensive. The fare may be different from one city to another city, as big city ojek will have higher fares than the smaller city ojek. Indonesia traffic law requires motorcycle riders and passengers to wear helmets; often on ojek, however, only the driver does so. Although the driver will sometimes provide a helmet for the passenger, more often, drivers simply avoid main streets, and the attention of police.

== Mexico ==
In Mexico City, there are thousands of motorcycle taxis. Their arrangements are informal (not traditional companies). They have precarious working conditions, long hours (11.3 hours a day), low wages (US$59.18 per week), and no social protections or benefits. 6.3% reported suffering from a disease, 49.5% corresponded to musculoskeletal conditions and only 11.6% were affiliated to any health system. 53.8% are owners of the vehicle and, although it does not seem to influence physical illness (P=0.03), it is related to the psychosocial ones (P=0.260).

== Nigeria ==
Nigeria has about three million motorcycle taxis, locally called okadas, with over one million in Lagos alone. In Lagos, new rules prohibit okadas from carrying pregnant women or children. Authorities say okadas will be stopped from driving the wrong way, and the number of roads on which they are authorized to travel will be sharply reduced.

== Peru ==
Motorcycle taxis, known locally as mototaxi, are “three-wheeled vehicles with a roof..” Mototaxis are capable of holding a maximum of three passengers, with the average fare ranging from one to two soles ($0.25 - $0.50 USD) in total. Usually, mototaxis are utilized to travel short distances such as between home, school, and work or sometimes used as means of connecting between official transportation destinations for longer journeys. From Peru’s coastal regions to their Amazon regions, mototaxis are abundant in low-altitude cities like Lima, Callao, and Iquitos with the population of motorcycle taxi drivers approximating around one million in 2022.

The mototaxi was designed and introduced by Peruvian mechanical engineer and businessman Octavio Mavila Medina in the late 1970s, around the time he founded Honda del Peru S.A. in January 1974. The popularity of mototaxis began to especially rise following the deregulation of public transportation in 1991 by Peruvian President Alberto Fujimori's Decreto Legislativo 651.

Peruvian mototaxis come in two forms. The semi-open mototaxi is considered an older version compared to its closed counterpart. The exterior of the semi-open mototaxi is composed mainly of tarp while the closed mototaxi is made up of painted sheet metal.

Reports from 2022 indicate the sparsity of the mototaxi, prominently seen in Lima’s high to middle-class districts such as San Miguel and Magdalena del Mar.

== Philippines ==
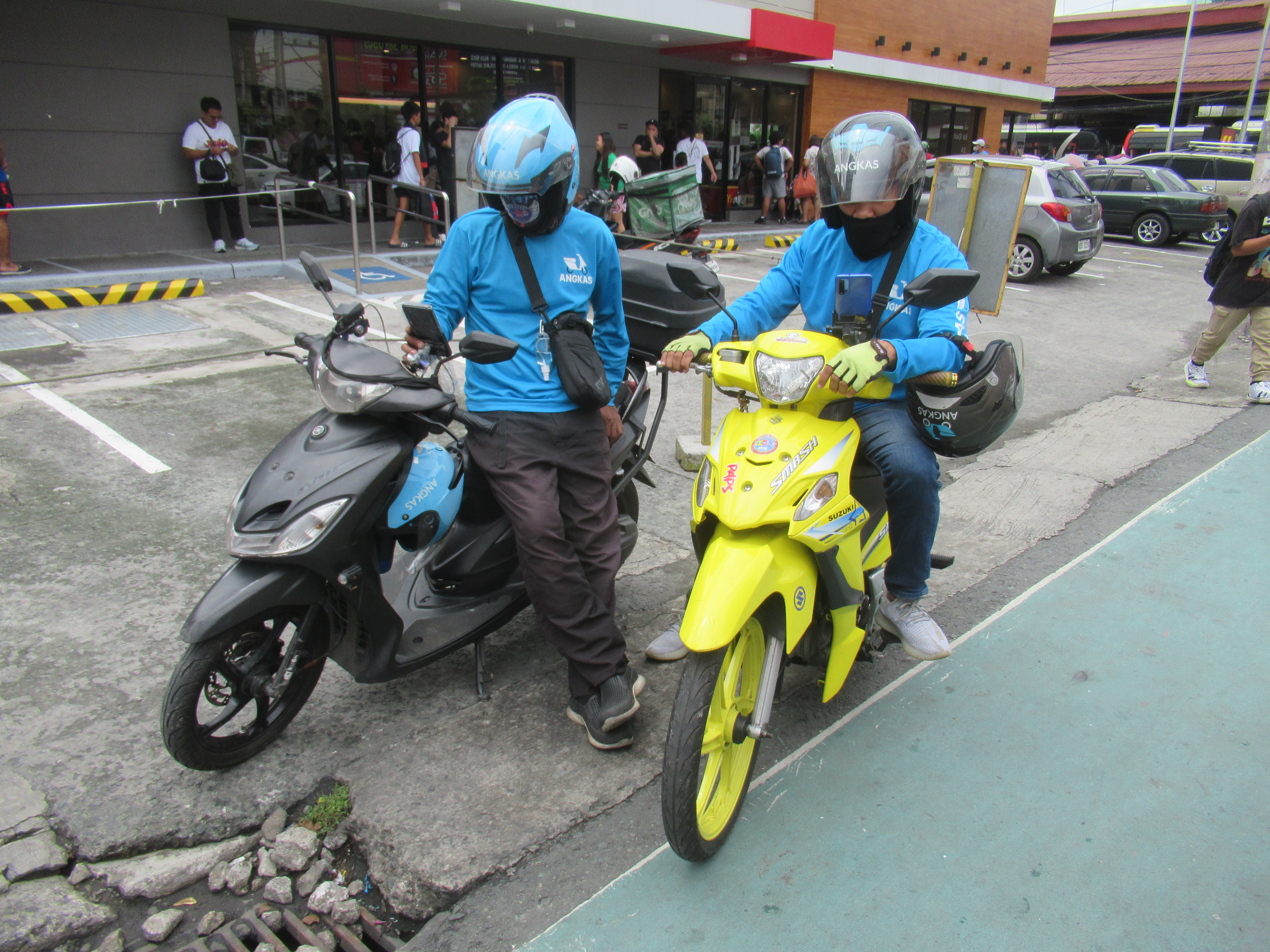
Angkas motorcycle taxi drivers in Pasay City, Philippines.

Angkas, Move It, Lalamove Ride and Grab are popular motorbike ride hailing apps in Philippines.

Traditionally the motorcycle taxis in the Philippines usually have sidecars, or seats extended sideways, often by use of a T-shaped crossbeam. The latter type of taxi is known as habal-habal or a skylab, owing to its crude resemblance to the Skylab space station which orbited the Earth in the 1970s.

Covered, three-wheel auto rickshaws, known as tricycles, are also a common mode of transport.

Angkas is a Philippine motorcycle vehicle for hire and delivery service company based in Makati, Metro Manila. Its competition in the passenger market is JoyRide.

Motorcycle taxis were deemed illegal in 2020 due to possible exposure of passengers and riders to COVID-19 when in contact with each other, especially in the cities.

== Thailand ==
GrabBike, Bolt, and inDrive are the popular motorbike ride hailing apps.

Motorcycle taxis (Thai: มอเตอร์ไซค์รับจ้าง, RTGS: motoesai rap chang; วินมอเตอร์ไซค์, RTGS: win motoesai; or เมล์เครื่อง, RTGS: me khrueang) are a common form of public transport in Bangkok and most other cities, towns, and villages in Thailand. They are generally used for short trips. In Bangkok, there are motorcycle taxi queues on many sois, or side streets, and the queues are regulated by land transport authority. Licensed motorcycle taxi operators wear orange vests with yellow number plates. The driving license with photo and driver's details in form of yellow card is placed on the back of the driver where the passenger can see clearly. In compliance with Thailand's motorcycle helmet law, many (but not all) drivers carry a spare helmet to offer to passengers. Bangkok locals generally only use motorcycle taxis when they need to get somewhere fast, as metered taxi-cabs can not only be more expensive for short trips but also slower than flat-rate motorcycles. Therefore, motorcycle taxi-drivers in Bangkok have built their reputation on delivering service as quickly as possible and tend to drive very fast and weave through traffic.

== United Kingdom ==
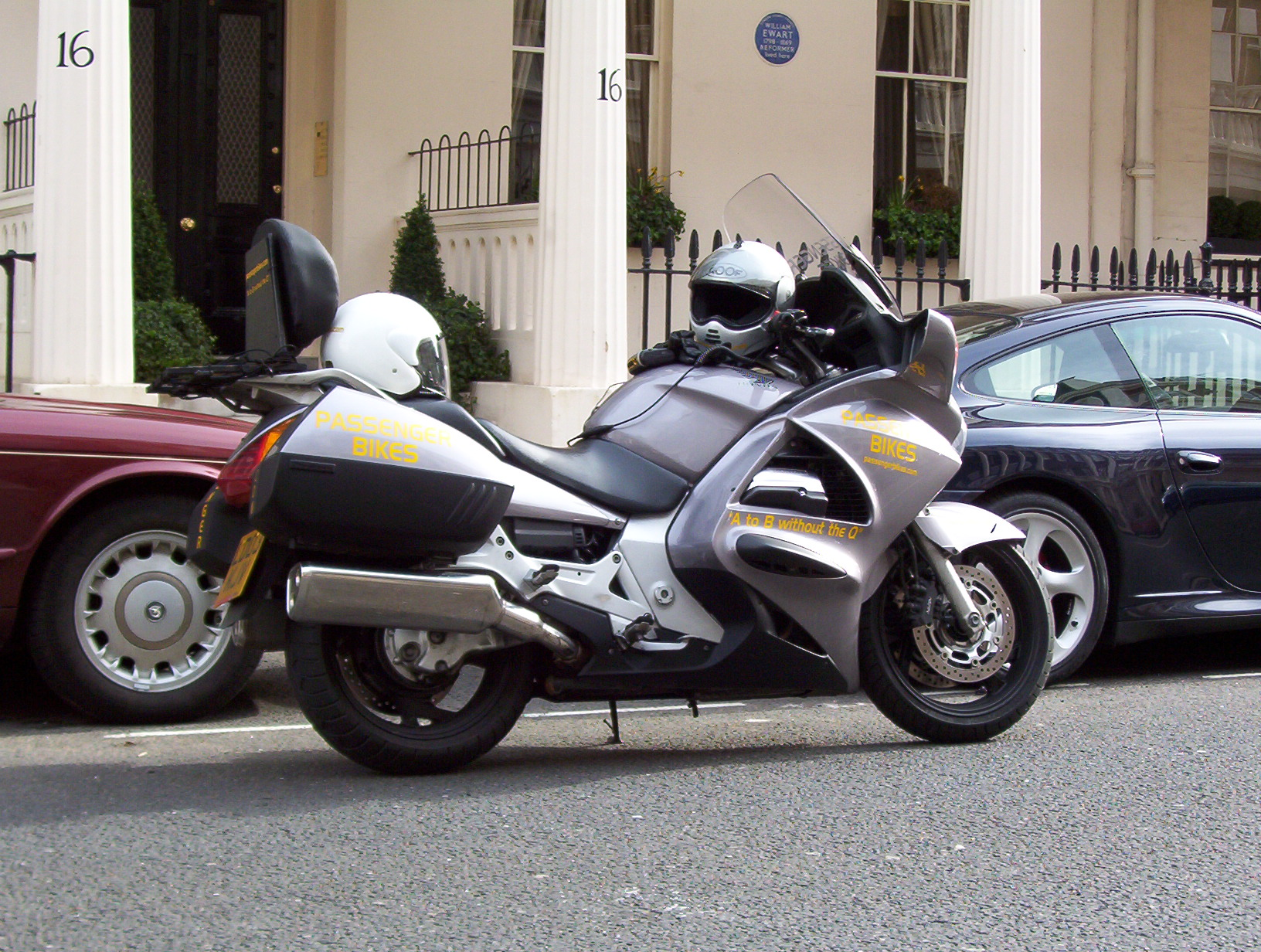
A motorcycle taxi waiting for passenger in London

Motorcycle taxi service in London began in 1990 as a niche industry. All equipment is provided for the passenger, along with an intercom system linking the rider and passenger. The motorcycles have racks that can hold a carry-on suitcase, for trips to local airports, especially Stansted, Gatwick, and City. The bikes are now licensed by Transport for London and the Public Carriage Office, which also license London's black cabs.

== United States ==
Moto Limos Club, a motorcycle for-hire service, started in California and New York City in 2011. As of 2012, the business filing was not renewed and of 2015 the filing was considered suspended. Passengers were not able to hail the motorcycles on the street; instead, a yearly individual or corporate membership fee is charged, plus an hourly rate. Experienced riders, many former Police motorcycle riders, carried clients on Honda Gold Wings, and in California, can bypass traffic congestion by lane splitting. Passengers were provided with helmets, airbag vests, and in-helmet, Bluetooth cell phones. The service also bought several Can-Am Spyders, before realizing they were not capable of splitting lanes.

== Vietnam ==
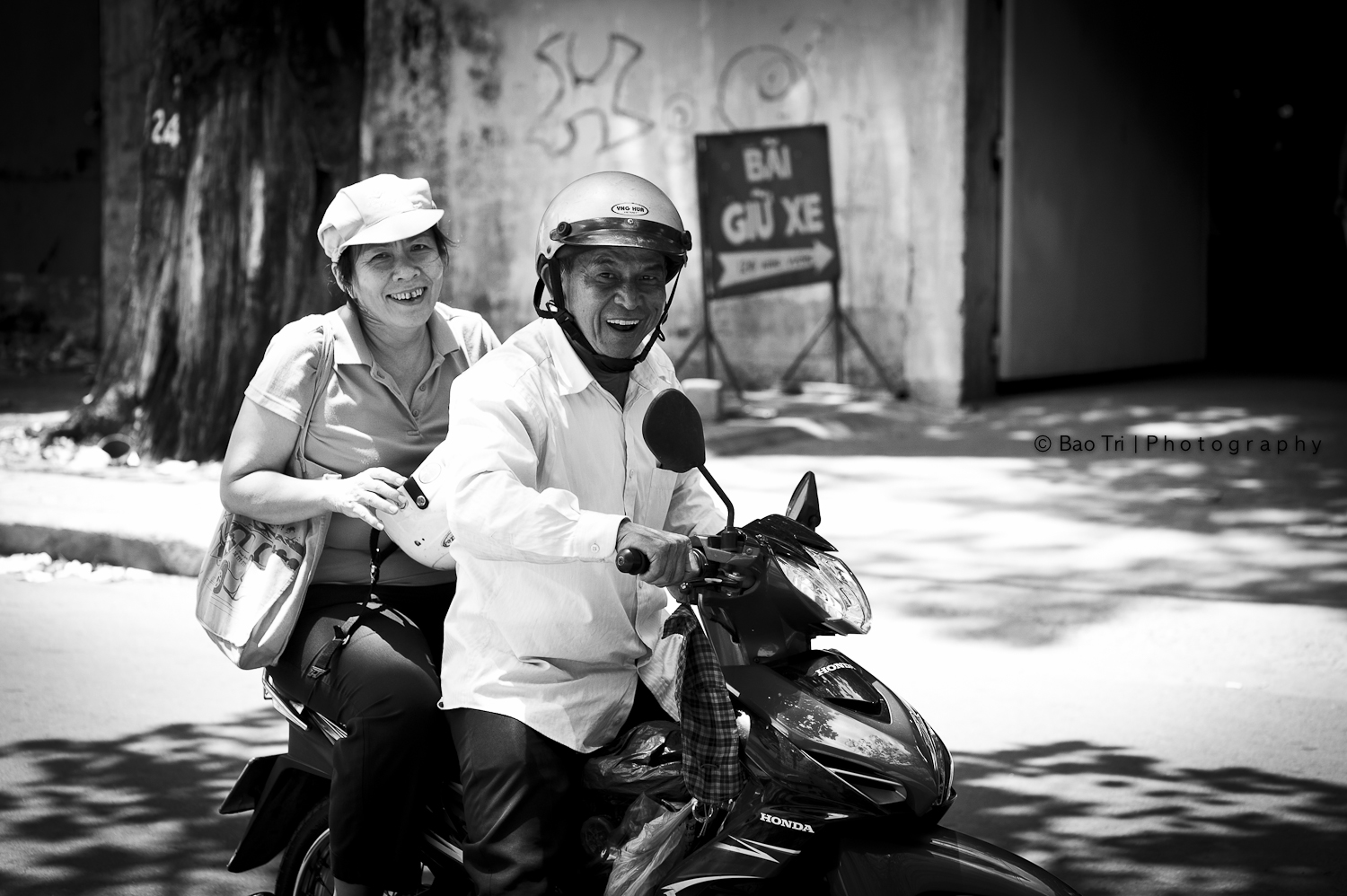
A Vietnamese xe ôm driver and his passenger

Nimble motorcycle taxis, which surpass buses in speed and mobility, comprise one of the most popular modes of transportation in Vietnam, where they are known as xe ôm. Passengers can get a ride via mobile app or by hailing passing operators, or by finding drivers who gather at public places such as schools, markets, hospitals, and bus and train stations.

Before the rise in popularity of ride-hailing apps, motorcycle taxi driving was a mostly informal economy, although some unions existed. Fare is verbally agreed upon before the trip based on distance. Some informal motorcycle taxi drivers still exist, as well as drivers working for regulated ride-hailing companies who would take on ad-hoc trips not booked through the app.

Wearing a helmet on motorcycles is required by Vietnamese laws for both drivers and passengers, as such motorcycle taxi drivers would provide helmet for their customers.

Go-Viet had a 35% market share among motorbike vehicle for hire companies in Ho Chi Minh City just six weeks after launching there on August 1, 2018, according to Go-Jek founder and chief executive Nadiem Makarim.

== See also ==
- Boda-boda, an East African term for a bicycle taxi or motorcycle taxi
- Zémidjan, a term used in Benin for a motorcycle taxi
