= National Delivery Industrial Union =

Trade union of food couriers in Taiwan

- 全國外送產業工會
- Abbreviation: NDIU
- Established: April 2021; 5 years ago
- Type: Trade union
- Location: Taiwan
- Field: Food delivery
- Chairperson: Yu-An Chen
- Spokesperson: Su Po-hao
- Website: Facebook page

The National Delivery Industrial Union (NDIU) is a trade union of food courier workers in Taiwan. The union organises workers of Foodpanda, Uber Eats, Lalamove and GOGOX.

== History ==
Drivers organised the union in April 2021 in response to pay reductions at Foodpanda and Uber Eats. According to the new method, pay was based on delivery distance instead of the number of orders, which the union organisers said decreased their pay by as much as 30 percent on both platforms. The organisers also called for accident insurance coverage to be increased. Foodpanda said it supported the union but would also make sure all drivers understood the company's policy terms. The Ministry of Labor also said it supported the new union.

NDIU participated in that year's Labour Day celebrations in Taiwan together with the Taiwan Confederation of Trade Unions.
