= Kuayue Xingguang =

Battery electric van

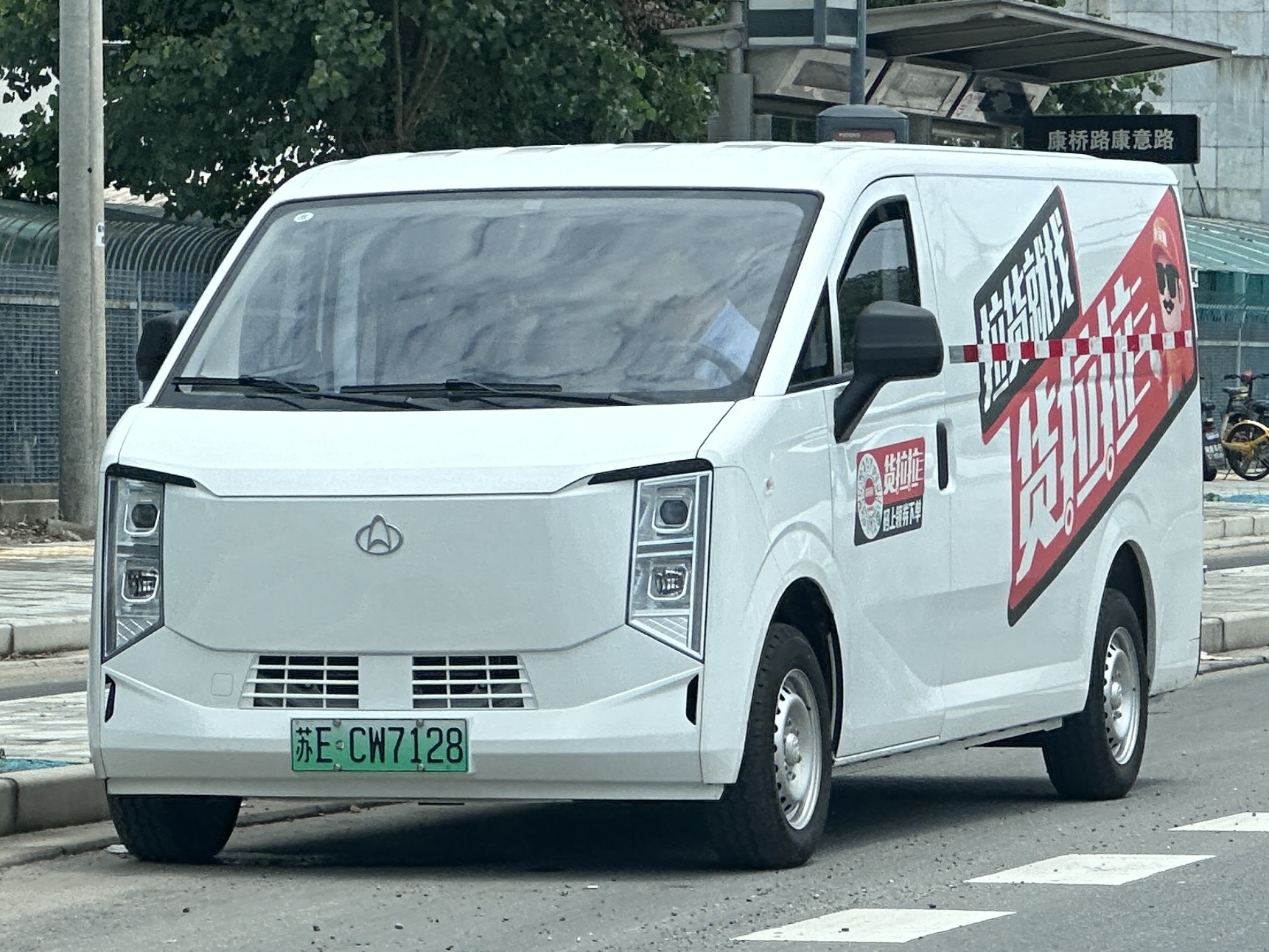

Overview
- Manufacturer: Changan (Kuayue)
- Also called: DuoLa Bafang (多拉八方); DuoLa Damian (多拉大面)
- Production: 2025–present
- Assembly: China

Body and chassis
- Class: Light commercial vehicle
- Body style: 5-door van
- Layout: Front-engine, front-wheel-drive layout
- Related: Kuayue Xingta

Powertrain
- Electric motor: 128 PS electric motor
- Battery: 65 kWh CATL (Kuayue Xingguang); 50.23 kWh CATL (DuoLa Bafang); 43.53 kWh CATL; 43.06 kWh FinDreams; 41.86 kWh EVE Energy

Dimensions
- Wheelbase: 3,300 mm (129.9 in)
- Length: 5,095 mm (200.6 in)
- Width: 1,870 mm (73.6 in)
- Height: 1,990 mm (78.3 in)

The Kuayue Xingguang (Chinese: 长安星光) is a battery electric van being the first vehicle from the collaboration between Changan Kuayue and the Chinese logistics company, Lalamove (货拉拉).

== Overview ==
The Lalamove started to plan entering the EV manufacturing industry from around 2021, and has added new energy vehicle sales to its business scope in 2023. The company also stated that it was exploring new opportunities in electric commercial vehicle research and development in its Hong Kong Stock Exchange prospectus.

In July 2025, Lalamove officially announced its entry to the new energy commercial vehicle field, with the launch of its automotive brand DuoLa Auto, and unveiled its first inhouse developed electric van as the DuoLa Bafang. The van was developed in house while being produced by Changan Kaicene under the Kuayue brand, spawning a Changan Kuayue variant as the Kuayue Xingguang.

== Specifications ==
At launch, three different batteries from CATL (43.53kWh), FinDreams (43.061 kWh) and EVE Energy (41.86 kWh) are available base on different trim levels delivering similar performance powering the same 94 kW electric motor positioned over the front axle. The 2026 model year added a 50.23kWh battery option supplied by CATL extending the range to 370km.

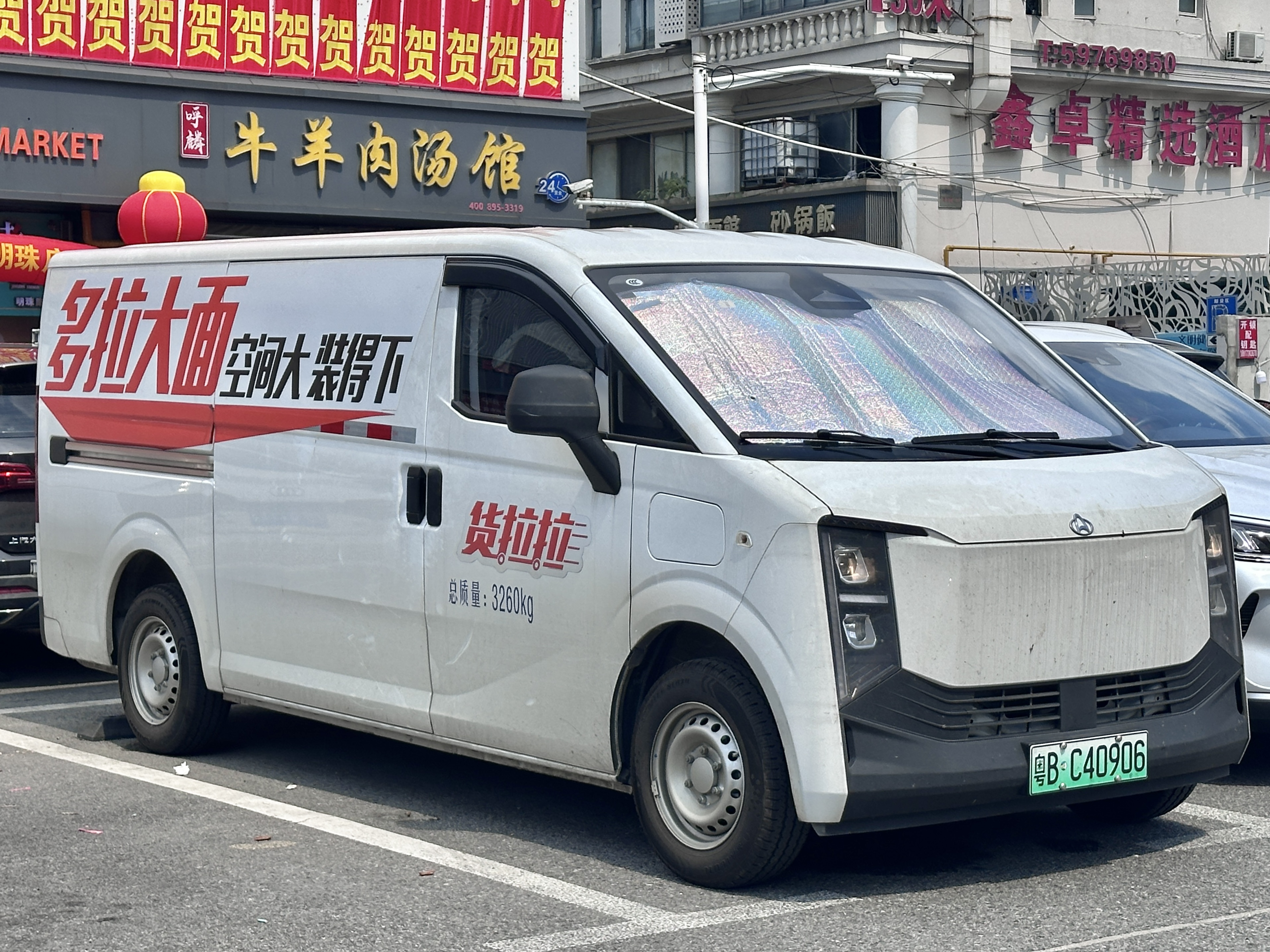
DuoLa Bafang/Damian

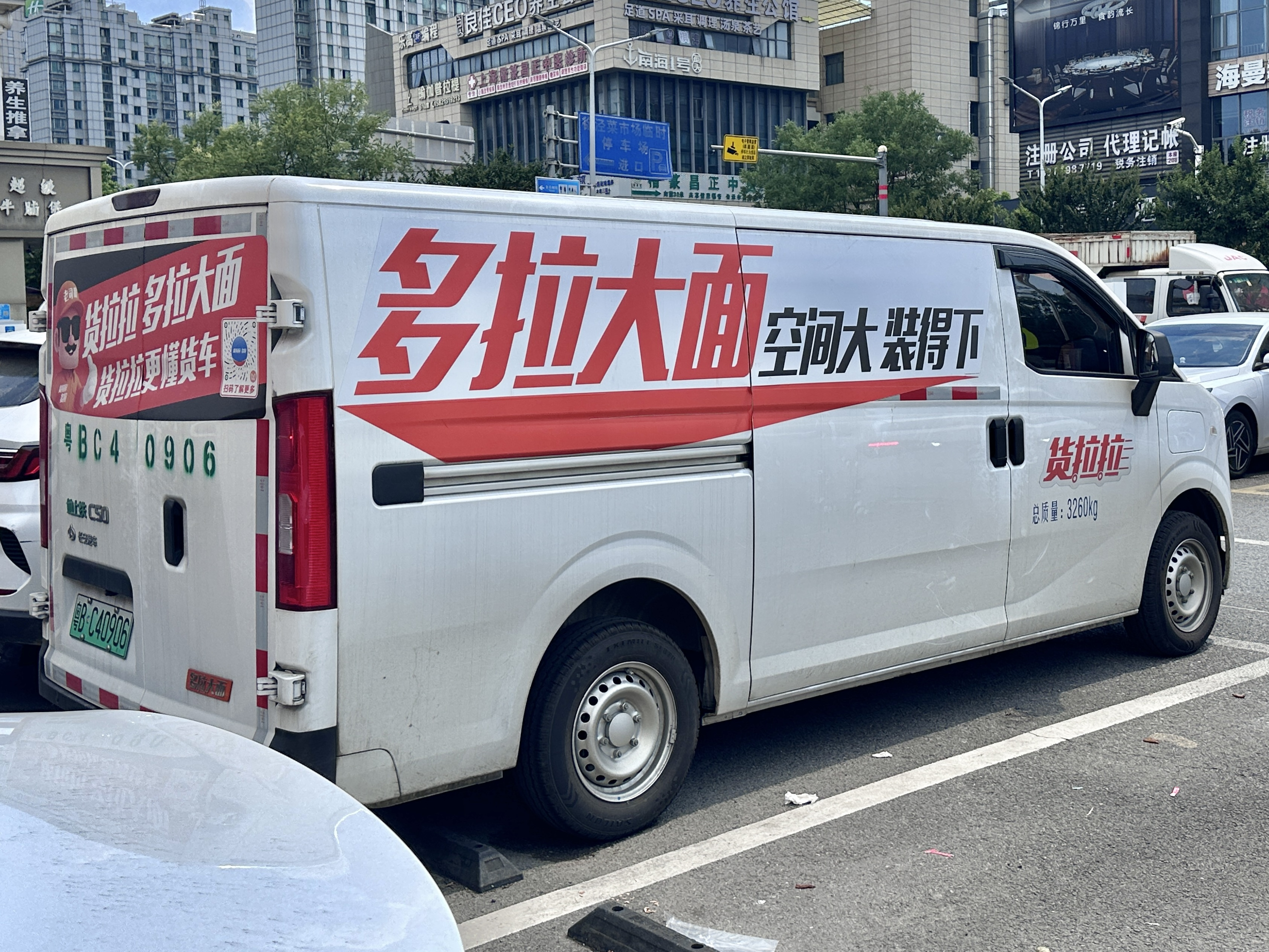
Rear view

The DuoLa Bafang was only available as a 3-seater panel van, the Xingguang offers a lot more variations. The Xingguang is the variant sold under the Changan Kuayue brand, with several additional models targeted towards a different market compared to the DuoLa Bafang. The Xingguang, 7-seater and 9-seater open window passenger variants are offered, with larger 65 kWh batteries from EVE Energy further extending the range to 470km.

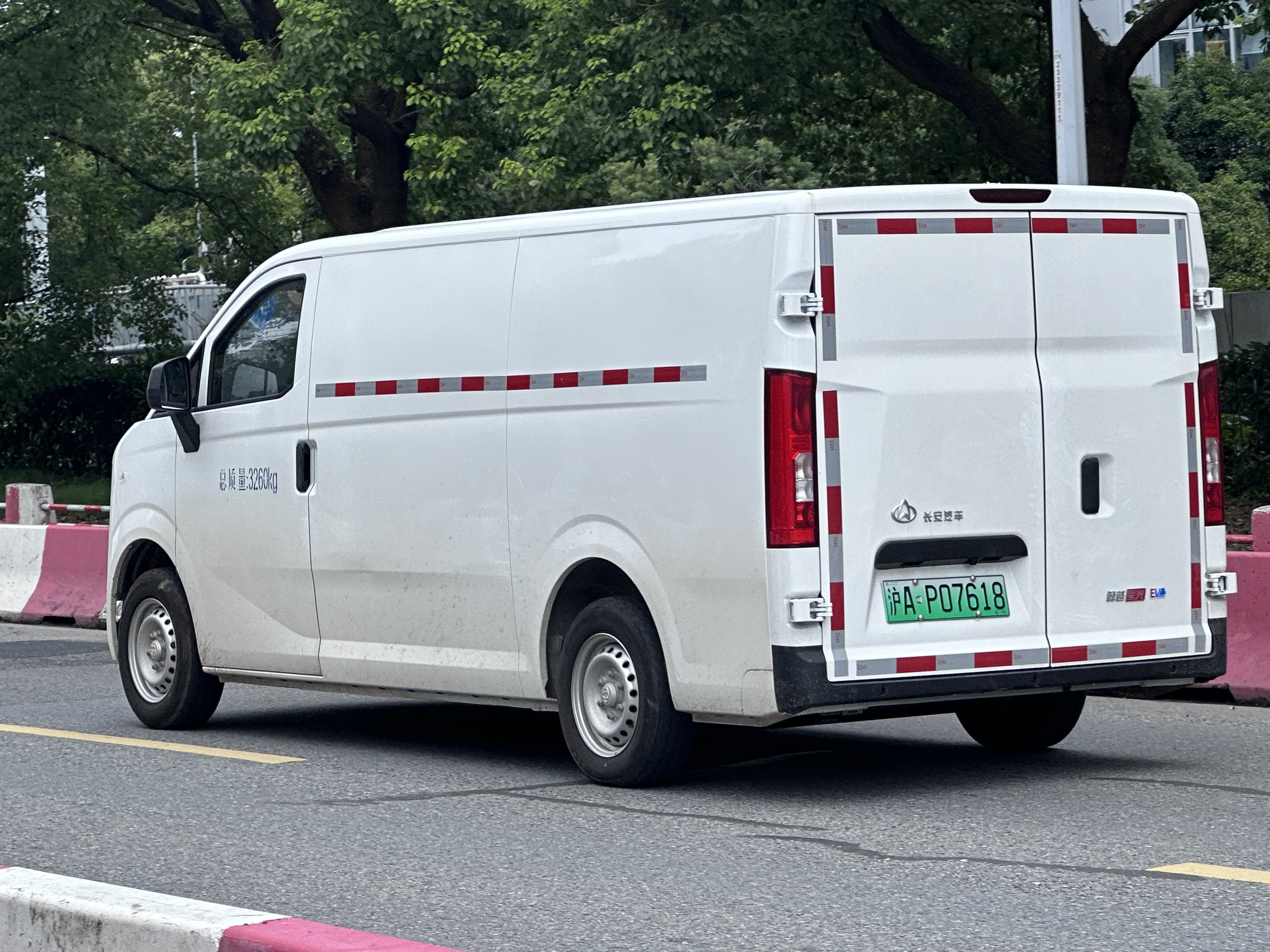
Rear view
