= Kuayue Xingta =

Series of light trucks

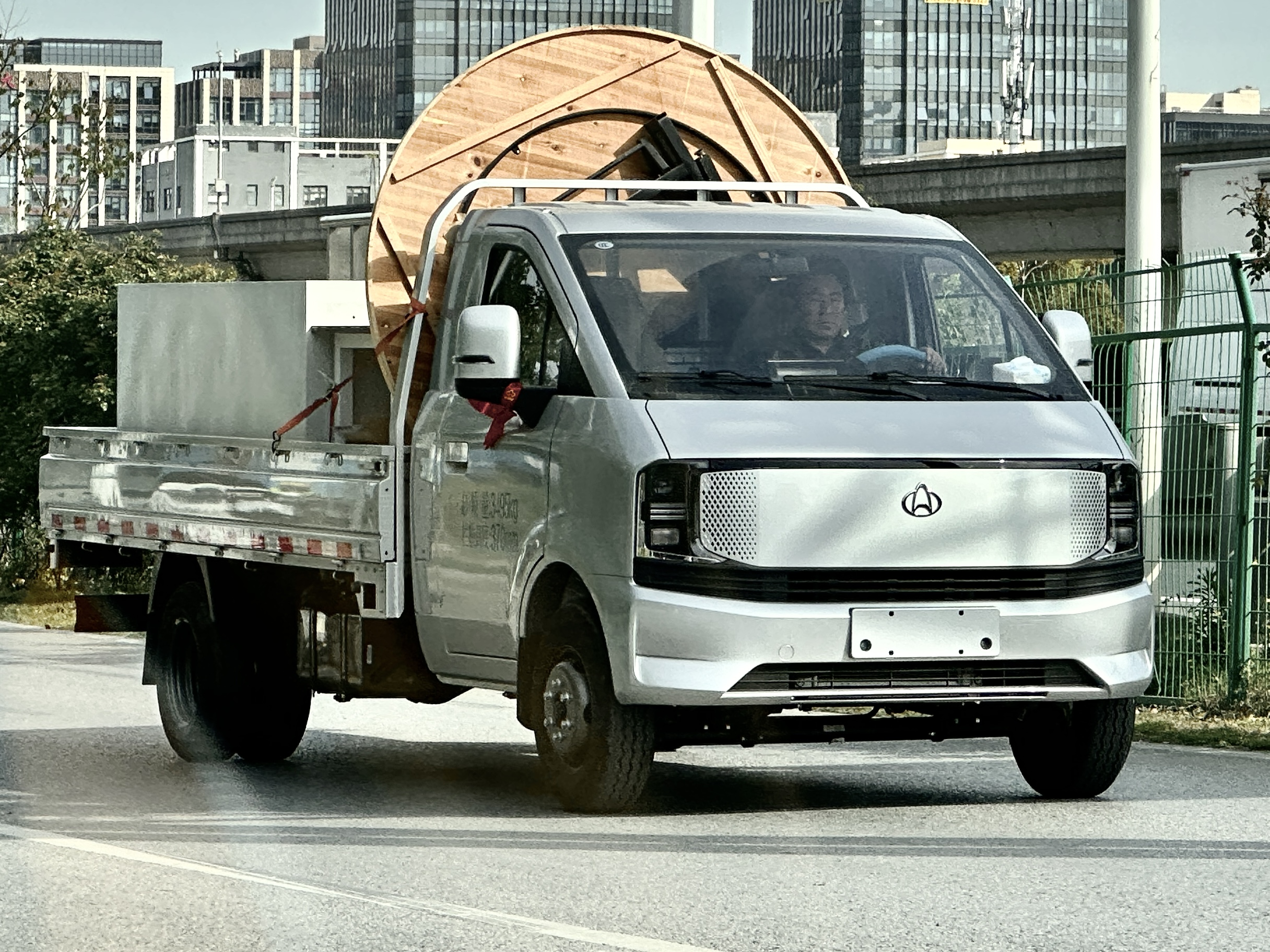

Overview
- Manufacturer: Changan (Kuayue)
- Production: 2025–present
- Assembly: China

Body and chassis
- Class: Light truck
- Body style: 2-door pickup truck; 4-door pickup truck
- Layout: Mid-engine, rear-wheel-drive
- Related: Kuayue Xingguang

Powertrain
- Engine: 1.6 L I4 (petrol); 2.0 L I4 (petrol)
- Transmission: 5-speed manual

Dimensions
- Wheelbase: 2,605 mm (102.6 in)
- Length: 5,959 mm (234.6 in) (single cab); 5,875 mm (231.3 in) (crew cab)
- Width: 1,950 mm (76.8 in)
- Height: 1,980 mm (78.0 in)

The Kuayue Xingta (Chinese: 跨越 星塔) is a series of light trucks produced by Changan Automobile under the Kuayue sub-brand.

== Overview ==
The Xingta was released by Changan Kuayue in 2025. Was available as the base model Xingta K5 and the Xingta S5 dually version, with both versions available as single and crew cab variants. The Xingta also includes CNG, gasoline, and electric powered variants.

The single cab model is 5.959 meters long with a 3.8 meter by 1.85 meter cargo bed, while the crew cab model is 5.875 meters long with a 3.05 meter by 1.85 meter cargo bed.

The chassis use a high-strength steel straight-through frame featuring 9 crossbeams. The front and rear suspensions are non-independent leaf spring, with the front suspension featuring a transverse stabilizer.

== Specifications ==
The powertrain of the trim gasoline-powered Xingta features the Yu'an H20 mid-mounted 2.0 liter naturally aspirated gasoline engine with a compression ratio of 13.5. A 1.6 liter naturally aspirated gasoline engine is also available, while the pure electric version called the Xingta EV is equipped with batteries supplied by Yiwei (亿纬) and CATL, with a ranges covering 320 to 475 km depending on the model.
