= GOGOX =

GoGo Tech Limited
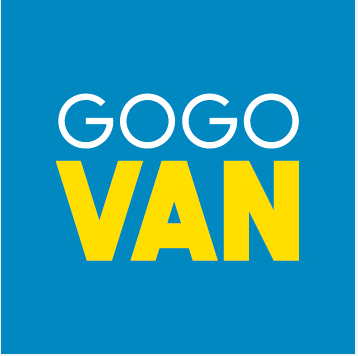
- Formerly: GOGOVAN
- Company type: Private
- Industry: Technology
- Founded: 2013
- Founders: Steven Lam Hoi-yuen, Nick Tang Kuen-wai, and Reeve Kwan Chun-man
- Headquarters: Hong Kong
- Area served: Asia
- Website: GOGOX.com

GOGOX, previously GoGoVan, is an on-demand ride sharing service based in Asia, which focuses on transportation of freight and goods in urban areas. Steven Lam Hoi-yuen, Nick Tang Kuen-wai and Reeve Kwan Chun-man co-founded the service in 2013. The service was initially launched in Hong Kong, before expanding its services. It operates in five countries in Asia, including Hong Kong, Singapore, mainland China, Taiwan, South Korea and India.

== History ==
Steve Lam Hoi-yuen, Nick Tang Kuen-wai and Reeve Kwan Chun-man co-founded GoGoVan in Hong Kong in the summer of 2013. The startup planned on providing an alternative solution for people in Hong Kong who required a van after the founders were working on a small lunchbox delivery service. The co-founders had previously worked in the delivery market while studying in California and when returning to Hong Kong they realized it was quite difficult and time-consuming to organize van transport in the city. In Hong Kong where the service was launched, it was estimated that van call centres took around 20–30 minutes to organize a van for hire. In comparison, the app typically took 10–15 seconds to order a van, with direct communication taking place between the driver and the customer. During the first year, it was suggested by South China Morning Post that over 100,000 users had downloaded the app in Hong Kong, with over 7,000 drivers registered and vetted to use the service.

The brand expanded its operations to neighbouring Singapore in 2014. During the first week of the expansion, they attracted 200 drivers to the service.

By 2014, it was suggested by TechCrunch that 50% of Hong Kong's van booking market was controlled by GoGoVan. As of 2014, GoGoVan had 18,000 registered drivers in Hong Kong.

During 2015, GoGoVan concentrated their expansion on Chinese cities, with moves into Beijing, Shenzhen and Taipei. They also moved into other Asian cities, including Seoul. There was a slight knock-on effect to GoGoVan and other sharing economy companies, as there were some isolated incidents of their drivers carrying passengers for money. According to the South China Morning Post, van call centres in Hong Kong had begun to downsize or close completely due to the success of the app and the companies monopoly in Hong Kong for moving freight.

In late 2017, GoGoVan merged with mainland Chinese competitor 58 Suyun. That deal gave GoGoVan instant coverage across more than 300 cities in China.

In July 2020, entering its seventh anniversary, in order to convey the company's long-term development strategy as well as to build a clear market positioning, GoGoVan officially rebranded to GOGOX.

In 2025, the company reported revenue of RMB 671 million and continued narrowing its net loss while strengthening its presence in Hong Kong and overseas markets.

== Funding ==
The Series A funding round was for US$6.5 million, with Centurion Private Equity as the main investor.

In June 2015, GoGoVan received its third major investment, with its Series B+ round raising an additional US$10 million. The Series B+ was co-led by existing investor Renren and new investor Zemin Hu.

GoGoVan's most notable investment came in May 2016. The Series C funding round was for an undisclosed amount. Alibaba launched their US$130 million fund to Hong Kong investors, with GoGoVan said to be one of the major recipients of the investment fund. The Series C also included Singapore Press Holdings as a major investor.

In July 2021, GoGoX raised US$100 million in a funding round led by BOCOM International and Cyberport Macro Fund. Other investors included Alibaba, 58.com, Cainiao, China InnoVision, and Qianhai Equity Investment Fund.

In 2022, GoGoX was listed on the Hong Kong Stock Exchange (HK: 2246).

== See also ==
- Lalamove
