= George Royeca =

Filipino entrepreneur

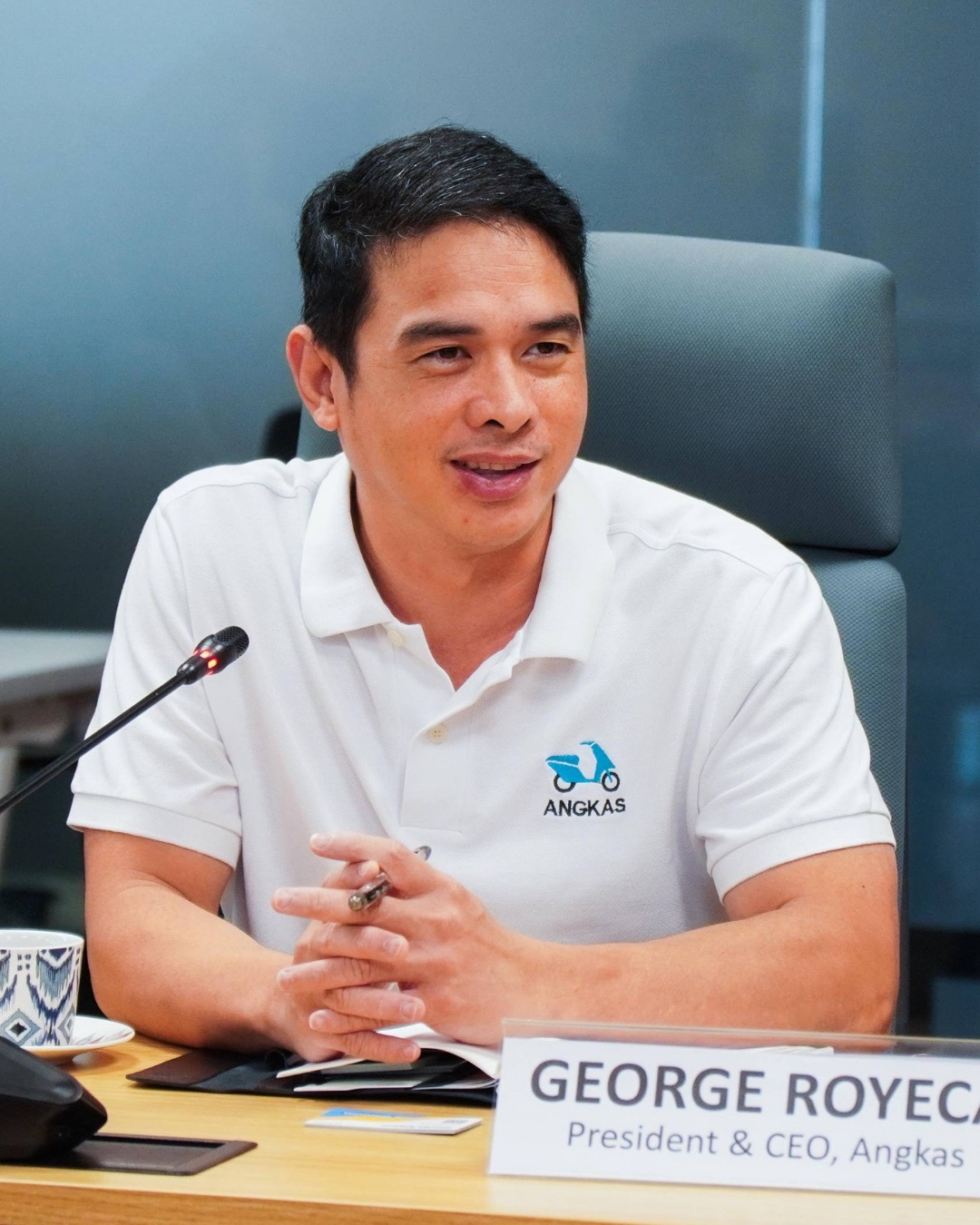
- Royeca in 2026
- Born: George Ilagan Royeca; January 19, 1982 (age 44); General Santos, Philippines
- Other name: Mister Angkas
- Occupation: CEO of Angkas
- Known for: Co-founding Angkas
- Spouse: Angeline Tham
- Awards: Ten Outstanding Young Men (TOYM) (2020); Rotary Golden Wheel Award for Entrepreneurship Excellence (2024)

George Ilagan Royeca (born January 19, 1982), also known as Mister Angkas, is a Filipino business executive who serves as the co-founder and chief executive officer (CEO) of the motorcycle ride-hailing platform Angkas. He founded Angkas alongside his wife, Singaporean businesswoman Angeline Tham.

== Early life ==
Royeca was born on January 19, 1982, in General Santos, Philippines. He grew up in a family that valued entrepreneurship and innovation, which later influenced his career path.

== Career ==
=== Business career ===
Royeca became the CEO of Angkas in November 2021, leading one of the Philippines' most prominent motorcycle ride-hailing services. Under his leadership, Angkas has expanded its services and played a significant role in providing affordable and efficient transportation solutions in the Philippines.

In his personal column, *"Peddler of Hope,"* Royeca has written about his commitment to empowering informal workers through his business endeavors. He emphasizes the importance of creating opportunities for marginalized communities and fostering economic growth through innovation.

On February 17, 2025, Royeca's driver license was suspended by the Land Transportation Office for 90 days after he assumed full responsibility for the viral motorcade of Angkas riders in Cainta, Rizal, on February 4. During the incident, riders obstructed a road intersection to make a left turn, causing traffic delays. Royeca apologized over the incident.

=== Political career ===
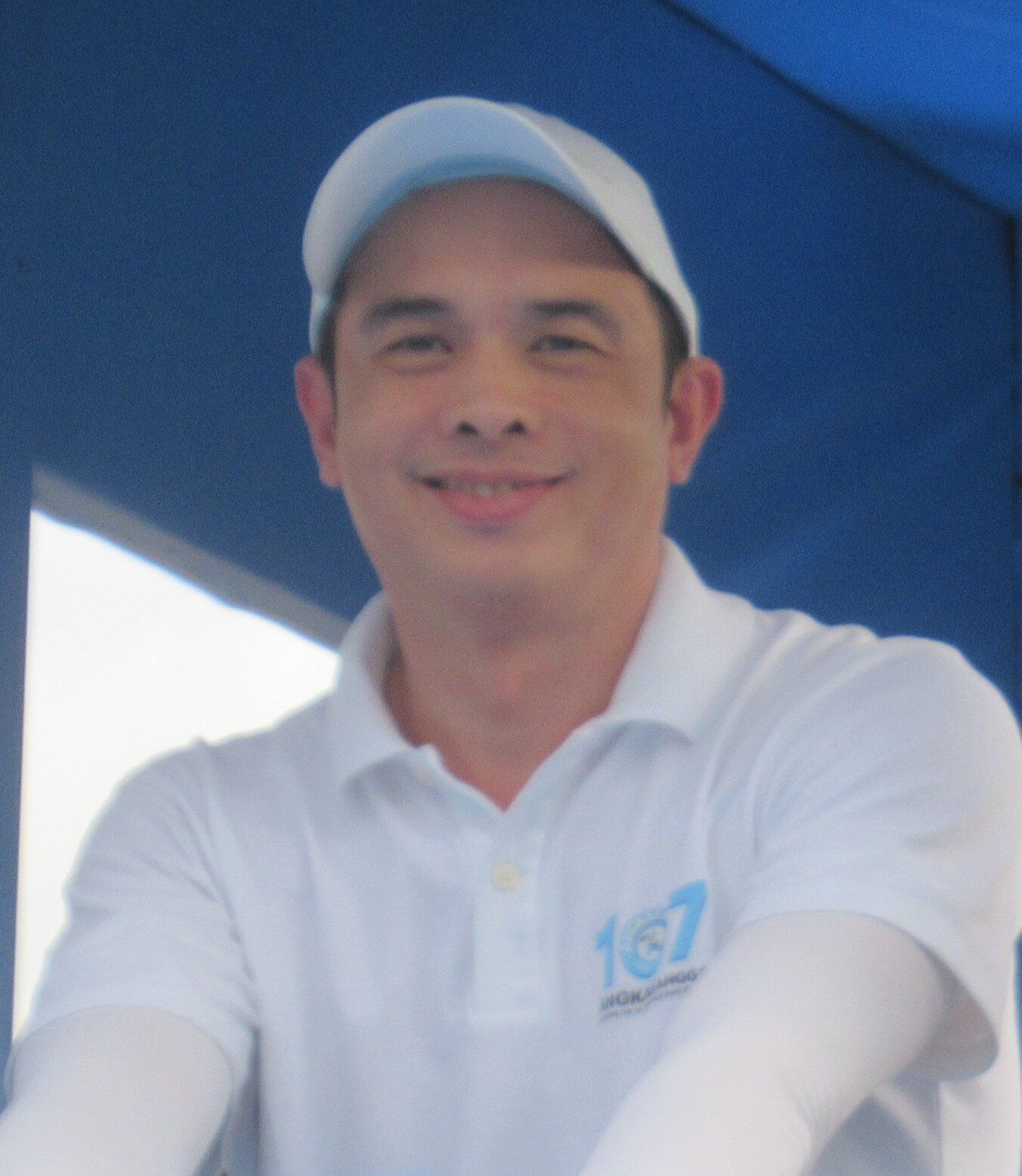
Royeca during the 2024 Metro Manila Film Festival Parade of Stars in Manila

In October 2024, Royeca entered politics through the Angkasangga Party-list, filing his certificate of nomination and acceptance (CONA) as its first nominee for the 2025 elections. The party-list focuses on protecting informal workers' rights and received endorsement from former Manila Mayor Isko Moreno, who branded it as "Yorme's Choice" for Manila. However, the party-list failed to secure a seat in the 20th Congress.

== Personal life ==
Royeca is married to Angeline Tham, a Singaporean entrepreneur who co-founded Angkas with him. The couple has been instrumental in building Angkas into one of the Philippines' leading motorcycle ride-hailing platforms. Royeca currently resides in Cebu, Philippines, where he continues to oversee the operations and growth of Angkas.

Royeca and Tham are known for their collaborative efforts in both business and advocacy, particularly in promoting entrepreneurship and empowering informal workers. Their partnership has been a driving force behind Angkas' success and its impact on the Philippine transportation sector.

== Awards and recognition ==
Royeca has received several notable awards for his entrepreneurial achievements:

- Named one of the Ten Outstanding Young Men (TOYM) in 2020
- Recipient of the Rotary Golden Wheel Award for Entrepreneurship Excellence in 2024
