= Pillion =

Secondary cushion on a two-wheel vehicle

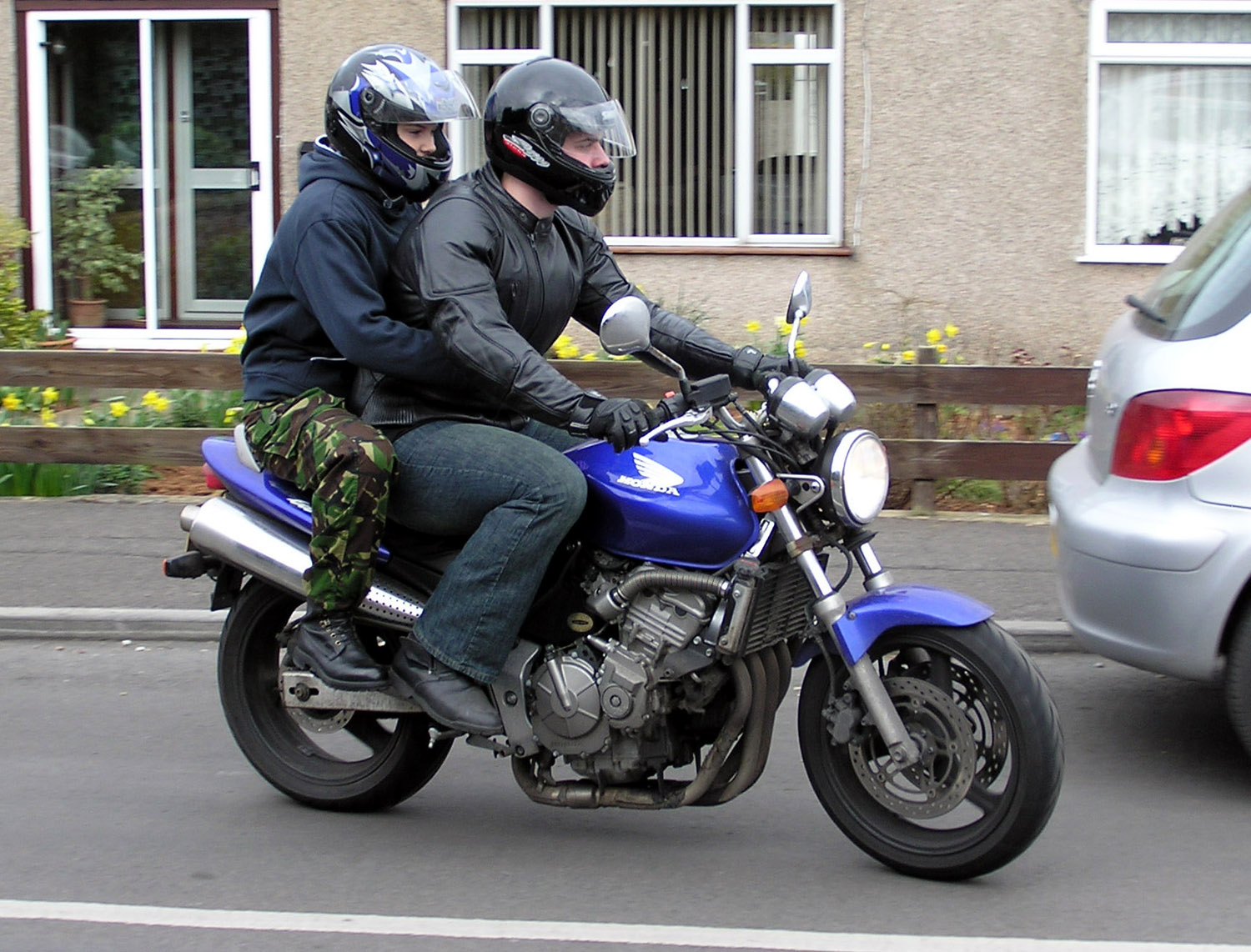
Rider with pillion on a Honda CB600F

A pillion is a secondary pad, cushion, or seat behind the main seat or saddle on a motorcycle or moped. A passenger in this seat is said to "ride pillion". The word is derived from the Scottish Gaelic for "little rug", pillean, from the Latin pellis, "animal skin". One or more pelts often were used as a secondary seat on horseback; the usage has carried over to motorcycles.

== Historical references ==
Following its retreat from the Battle of Dunkirk (where it is reputed that enough equipment was left behind to equip about eight to ten divisions), the British Army introduced a requirement that all officers up to the rank of colonel should be proficient in the use of the motorcycle, and all officers holding the rank of brigadier were required to be able to ride pillion. These requirements came about as a result of the large number of motor cars that were lost in action. The requirement for riding pillion was quietly dropped as large numbers of jeeps came into service in the middle of the war.

== Other terminology ==
"Riding two up" and "riding double" are common North American phrases for riding with a passenger.

"Riding bitch" is a vulgar American expression to denote sitting between two other people in a car or truck, where the transmission housing often forms a hump in the front or back analogous to a pillion. "Bitch seat" and "bitch pad" are North American slang for the pillion on a motorcycle; "riding bitch" is North American slang for "riding pillion".

In the Philippines, riding pillion is called "riding in tandem".

== Licensing and restrictions ==
To carry a pillion passenger in the United Kingdom, one must hold a full licence for the vehicle and there must also be a proper seat and foot pegs for the passenger. In the UK, a motorcyclist is not allowed to carry more than one pillion passenger, who must sit astride the machine on a proper seat; it is forbidden to carry a pillion passenger on a motorcycle that has not been designed to do so.

In Australia, vehicle operators must have held their licence (not including a learner's permit) for a minimum of one year before being legally allowed to carry a passenger where physically possible, following the upgrade to the required licence class. For example, in New South Wales, one must carry a Provisional 2 (Green) licence before being allowed to carry a pillion passenger.

Pillion-riding is associated with terrorist or criminal attacks in some South Asian countries. In Pakistan, for instance, pillion riding is often banned by local authorities around sensitive times, such as the Ashura commemoration, when there have been violent attacks on worshippers.

In the Philippines where policemen are already routinely checking motorcycle riders in response to increased incidence of crimes such as murder and robbery committed using a motorcycle, some cities are already considering ban on pillion riding, known as "riding in tandem" in the country. Some cities, such as Mandaluyong, has already enforced a ban on pillion riding unless the driver and pillion passenger are married or biologically related.
