= Angkas =

Motorcycle transport and delivery service company in the Philippines

DBDOYC Inc.
- Trade name: Angkas
- Industry: Technology; Transport; Package delivery
- Founded: 2016; 10 years ago
- Founder: Angeline Tham; George Royeca
- Headquarters: Makati, Philippines
- Key people: George Royeca (CEO)
- Website: angkas.com

DBDOYC Inc., doing business as Angkas, is a Philippine motorcycle vehicle for hire and package delivery company based in Makati, Metro Manila.

== History ==
Angkas is a Filipino company conceptualized by its Singaporean founder and former CEO Angeline Tham sometime in 2015 after she claimed that she got late for several meetings due to spending six hours in traffic. DBDOYC Inc. was set up as Angkas's operator.

The legality of Angkas' operation has been challenged by the government. The Land Transportation Franchising and Regulatory Board (LTFRB) suspended Angkas' operation in November 2017 over lack of a business permit and safety concerns regarding the usage of motorcycles in ride-sharing services. This led to Angkas to introduce parcel delivery service dubbed as "Angkas Padala" in December 2017. LTFRB's move was still challenged by Angkas before the Mandaluyong Regional Trial Court which made a decision on August 20, 2018 which barred LTFRB from arresting Angkas drivers. Angkas resumed operations the following month.

In December 2018, the Supreme Court issued a temporary restraining order which put on hold the implementation of the Mandaluyong court's decision. Despite the high court's TRO, Angkas continued operations risking the arrest of its drivers since it was believed that the ruling didn't concern the legality of the company's operations itself.

The government through the Department of Transportation (DOTr) announced in May 2019 that it would provisionally allow Angkas to operate again. Pilot operations of Angkas' motorcycle taxis in Metro Manila and Metro Cebu were allowed by the government for six months from June 2019 so the firm's operation could be monitored by the state as part of a study regarding the legality of motorcycles as public utility vehicles.

During the pilot operations, Angkas would be serviced by its 27,000 riders and could not add more motorcycles to its fleet.

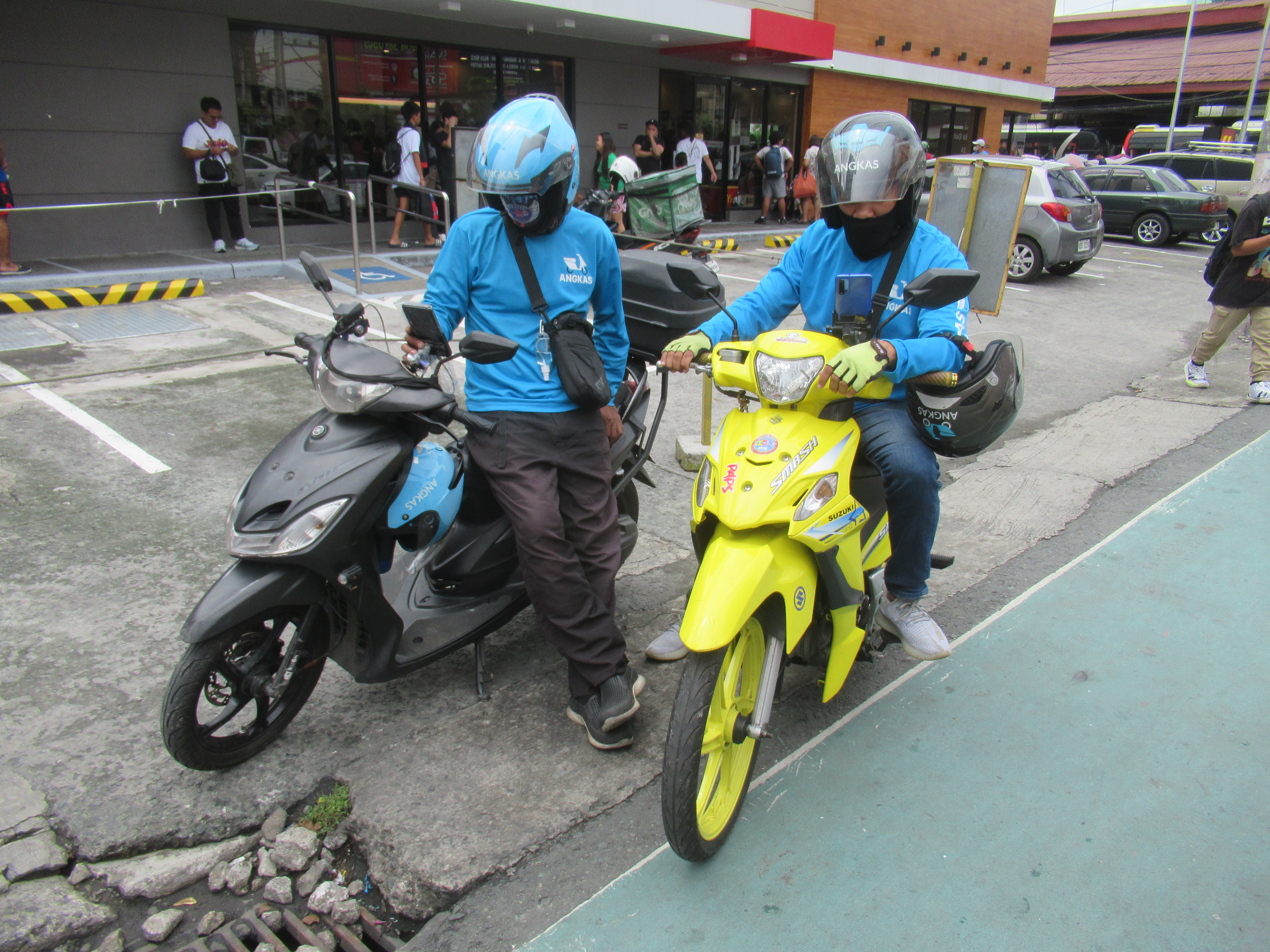
Pair riders in 2023

The pilot operations which was originally set to end on December 26, 2019 was extended by the technical working group of the DOTr until March 23, 2020 with the inclusion of two competitors, JoyRide and Move It. A cap of 30,000 riders in Metro Manila and 9,000 riders in Metro Cebu was imposed with the allocation of riders equally shared between the three motorcycle taxi service providers. Angkas would have to cut down its fleet of 27,000 riders to comply with the cap. Angkas in response sought a temporary restraining order from the Quezon City Trial Court against the imposition of the cap. It withdrew its bid in January 2020 after DOTr's technical working group increased the cap for of Metro Manila riders to 45,000.

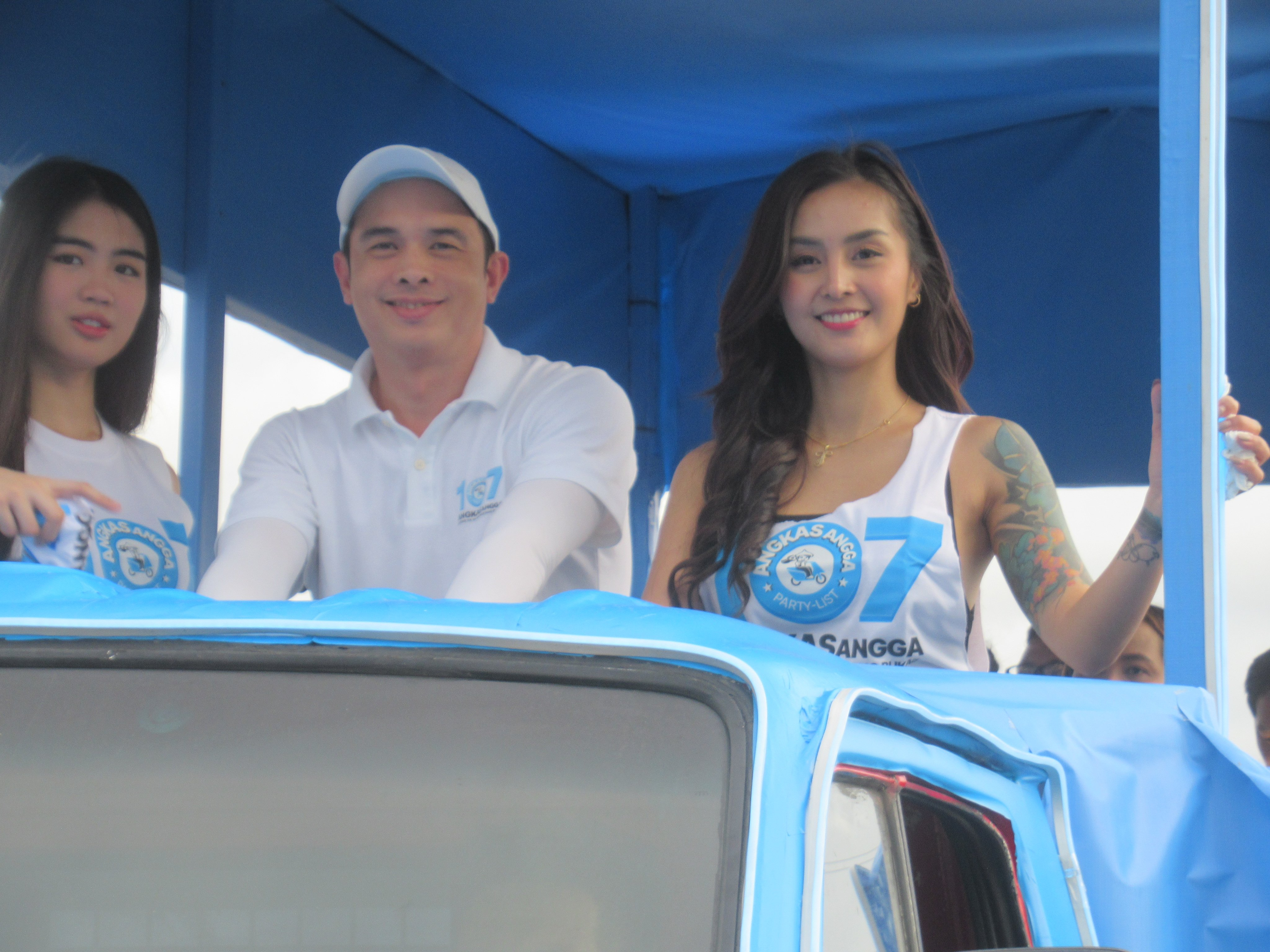
Angkas CEO George Royeca (center) with Azi Acosta (left) and Jenn Rosa (right) during the 2024 Metro Manila Film Festival Parade of Stars in Manila

In November 2021, the company announced that co-founder, former Chief Transport Advocate George Royeca, and Angeline Tham's husband, will take over as CEO. Tham will continue to be involved in the company even after stepping down.

In August 2024, Angkas signed a memorandum of understanding with the Social Security System to cover 30,000 partner riders in Metro Manila, Metro Cebu, and Cagayan de Oro. As self-employed members, it is entitled to security benefits such as sickness, maternity, disability, retirement, funeral, and death, including additional coverage from the DOLE's Employees' Compensation Commission program.

In October 2024, Angkas signed a memorandum of understanding with the local government unit of Camarines Sur to bring road safety and livelihood enhancement for the citizens of Camarines Sur through comprehensive motorcycle training programs, alongside a planned future expansion of the Angkas platform in Camarines Sur. In the same month, Angkas CEO George Royeca filed his certificate of nomination and acceptance with the COMELEC as first nominee of Angkasangga Party-list.

== Drivers ==
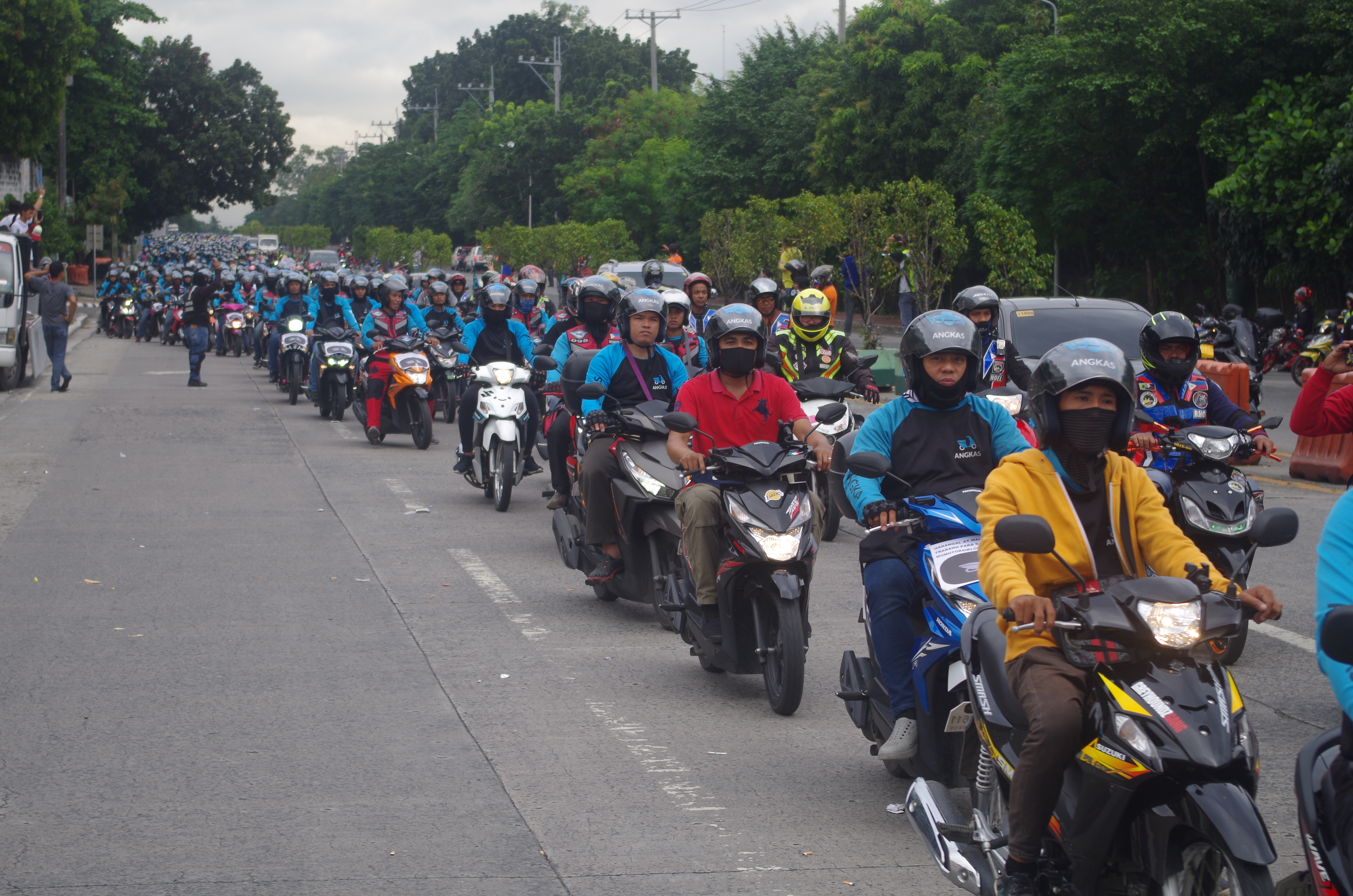
Angkas riders in Metro Manila

Angkas has over 30,000 drivers as of March 2023, which were drawn from a pool of 60,000 applicants who were provided free training from the company and are considered to be independent contractors. Applicant drivers are subjected to test by the company which includes on how to use the Angkas mobile app, and accomplishing an obstacle course.

== Markets ==
Prior to the crackdown of the government in late 2018, Angkas provided its services in Metro Manila, Cebu, Cagayan de Oro, and General Santos. As of October 2019, Angkas is available in Metro Manila and Metro Cebu. There are plans to introduce the service in Davao City and Batangas City, and resume operations in Cagayan de Oro. In March 2023, Angkas resumed operations in Cagayan de Oro.
