= Lalamove =

Asia-based delivery company

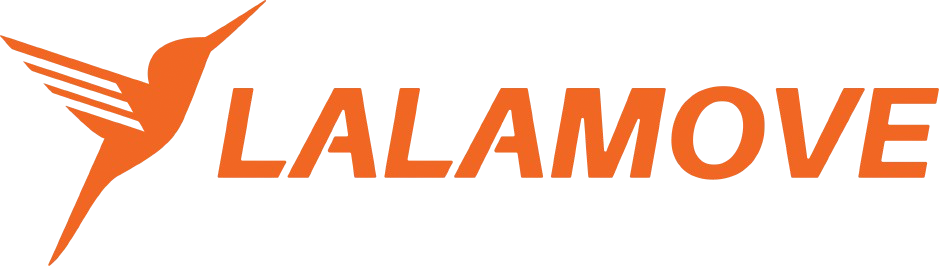
- Type: Private
- Industry: Transportation; Logistics; Delivery Platform; Mobility as a service
- Founded: December 2013
- Founder: Chow Shing-yuk
- Headquarters: Hong Kong
- Number of locations: 400 cities across 14 markets
- Key people: SMEs, e-commerce and individual users
- Website: lalamove.com

Lalamove (known as Huolala in Mainland China) is a logistics and delivery platform operating across Asia, the Americas, and EMEA. Founded in Hong Kong in 2013 as EasyVan, the company connects users with delivery partners via mobile and web applications, and as of 2026 operates in over 400 cities across 18 markets. Its parent company, Lalatech Holdings, is the world's largest logistics transaction platform by closed-loop freight gross transaction value (GTV).

== History ==
In December 2013, the company was founded in Hong Kong by Chow Shing-Yuk as EasyVan, digitising the traditional van-hailing industry by connecting users directly with drivers.

In 2014, the company rebranded to Lalamove to support its international expansion strategy.

In 2015, the service expanded beyond Hong Kong into Singapore, Taipei, and Bangkok.

Between 2016 and 2019, the platform entered the Philippine and Vietnamese markets.

In 2019, the company launched operations outside Asia for the first time, entering Brazil and Mexico.

In 2024, the platform introduced ride-hailing services in Southeast Asia and Indonesia.

In June 2025, the company entered the electric vehicle sector with the launch of its new energy vehicle brand "DuoLa Auto" and the DuoLa Bafang microvan.

In 2025, the company extended its reach to Bangladesh and the EMEA region, including Turkey, the UAE, and Germany.

In 2026, the company entered the United Kingdom, launching delivery services starting in London.

== Funding and market scale ==
In 2019, the company attained "unicorn" status following a US$300 million Series D funding round.

In 2021, its valuation rose further after a US$1.5 billion Series F round.

As of late 2024, the platform reported a presence in over 400 cities globally, with approximately 1,670 million monthly active merchants and 170 million active drivers.

== Corporate affairs ==
=== Subsidiaries and brands ===
- Huolala — the primary brand operating in Mainland China.
- Lalamove — the brand operating in Hong Kong, Southeast Asia, the Americas, and EMEA.
- Lalatech — the holding company for the group's global operations.

=== Corporate social responsibility ===
==== 2020 ====
The company launched its Asia-wide "Deliver Care" COVID-19 relief programme.

The company introduced the "LalaJeep" service in Quezon City, Philippines, helping jeepney drivers affected by the pandemic transition to delivery operations.

==== 2022 ====
The company released its inaugural Sustainability Report, outlining its framework for integrating Environmental, Social, and Governance (ESG) factors into operational planning.

==== 2023 ====
The company launched the "Makes a Pawfect Move" campaign across Asia and Latin America, providing logistics support for pet rescue organisations.

The company established the "BiyahEdukasyon" programme in the Philippines, providing educational assistance to the families of 100 partner drivers.

==== 2024 ====
The company hosted the "Driving Dreams" drawing competition in Indonesia to mark National Children's Day, open to the children of driver partners and the general public.

==== 2025 ====
In April, following a 7.7 magnitude earthquake in Myanmar on 28 March, the company coordinated the delivery of relief supplies to victims treated at Rajavithi Hospital in Bangkok, Thailand.

In August, the company partnered with local organisations in Brazil to distribute over 6,000 essential items to homeless populations.

In August, the company collaborated with Malaysian design brands Yellobanana and Montigo under the "Kita move bersama" initiative, producing merchandise aimed at fostering community engagement between drivers and users.

In November, following a five-alarm fire at Wang Fuk Court in Tai Po on 26 November, the company donated HK$6 million to the HKSAR Government's "Tai Po Wang Fuk Court Relief Fund."

The company organised free health screenings for female driver-partners in Thailand under the "Lalamove Sends Love to Mom" initiative.

The company launched "ElderCare on the MOVE" to support elderly communities across its Asian markets.

In Hong Kong, the company runs the "ElderCare on the MOVE" (LALA聲送暖耆妙行) programme with local non-profit organisations, providing delivery support for essential supplies to the elderly.

=== Disaster relief and humanitarian aid ===
In April 2025, following a 7.7 magnitude earthquake in Myanmar on 28 March, the company coordinated the delivery of relief supplies to victims treated at Rajavithi Hospital in Bangkok, Thailand.

In August 2025, the company partnered with local organisations in Brazil to distribute over 6,000 essential items to homeless populations.

In November 2025, following a five-alarm fire at Wang Fuk Court in Tai Po on 26 November, the company donated HK$6 million to the HKSAR Government's "Tai Po Wang Fuk Court Relief Fund."

== Services ==
- Freight and delivery — matches users with drivers of motorcycles, cars, vans, and trucks (from 1-ton vehicles to large lorries) for point-to-point delivery.
- Moving services — residential and office relocations, which may include driver assistance with loading and unloading.
- Inter-city freight — long-haul logistics connecting businesses across different cities.
- Lalamove Ride — ride-hailing available in the Philippines, Malaysia, Indonesia, and Vietnam.
- Enterprise solutions — API integration for e-commerce businesses to automate delivery scheduling and fulfilment.
- Vehicle rental and sales — sale and leasing of vehicles to drivers in Mainland China, with a focus on new energy vehicles.
- Fleet management — a platform for fleet owners to register and manage multiple vehicles and drivers, with oversight of daily operations and driver performance.
- Pet transportation — a specialised pet transport service, available exclusively in Hong Kong.

== Technology ==
The platform uses a proprietary matching algorithm to pair delivery orders with nearby drivers. Application features include real-time GPS tracking and a multi-stop function allowing up to 20 stops per route.

In 2021, following safety incidents, the application was updated with an integrated "Safety Center" offering one-touch emergency assistance, in-ride audio recording, and route deviation alerts.

In 2025, the company partnered with the Hong Kong Productivity Council to implement an AI-driven driving behaviour prediction system, using artificial intelligence to identify and mitigate risky driving patterns.

In 2025, the company joined the Hong Kong government's "Low-Altitude Economy Regulatory Sandbox" project, exploring the use of drones for logistics and delivery to remote areas and offshore islands.

== Awards and recognition ==
=== 2023 ===
- Grand Award, The Most Devoted Award, and Best Social Impact Award — Industry Cares Recognition Scheme.
- Tech Enabler of the Year and Tech Impact Company of the Year — Revive Tech Asia Awards.
- Silver Award (mobile application) — Asia Smart App Awards, organised by the Hong Kong Wireless Technology Industry Association.
- Bronze designations for its membership programme and its use of rewards — Loyalty & Engagement Awards.
- Winner, Best Employer Brand, and finalist, Best Talent Acquisition Team — Annual LinkedIn Talent Awards.

=== 2024 ===
- Best Use of CSR Award, for the "Make A Pawfect Move" campaign — International CSR Excellence Awards.
- Gold Award — Putra Aria Brand Awards.
