= CIAL =

CIAL may refer to:

- Crédit Industriel d'Alsace et de Lorraine, a French bank (1931-2007) subsequently merged into the CIC network
- Cochin International Airport Limited, the company operating Cochin International Airport in India
- Centre d'Instruction de l'Armée à Lucerne, French name for a military academy in Kaserne Allmend, Luzern, Switzerland
- Cial, Neo-Arcadia rulers and younger sister of Ciel in Mega Man Zero manga
