= Banque d'Alsace et de Lorraine =

Former bank based in Strasbourg

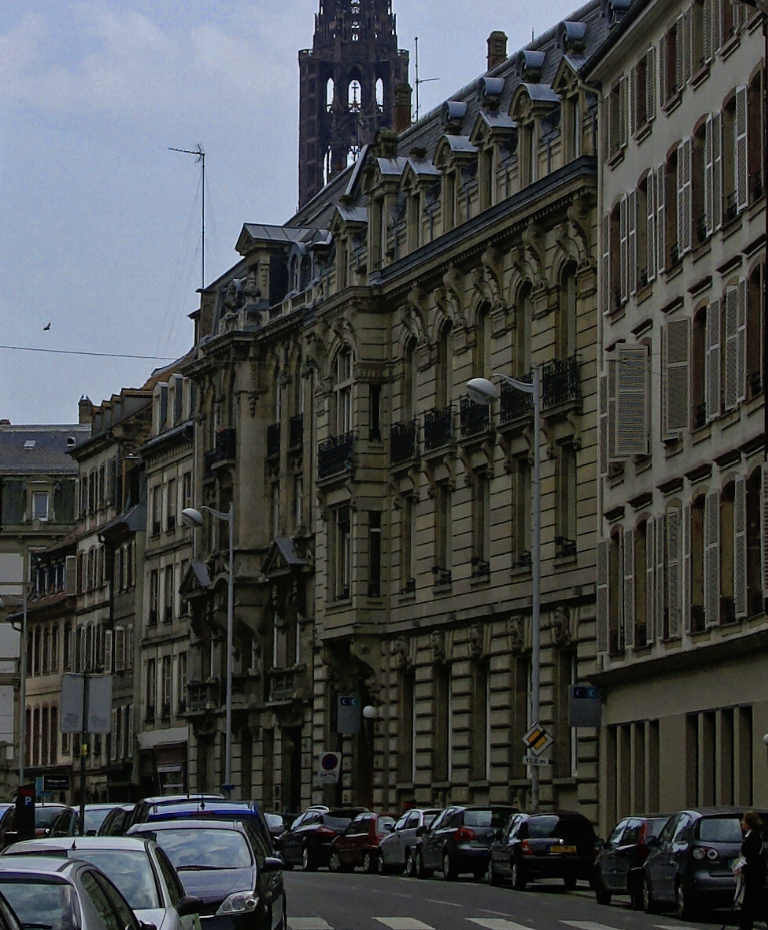
- Former head office of BAL at 14, rue de la Nuée-Bleue in Strasbourg, with the spire of Strasbourg Cathedral in the background
- Company type: Private company
- Industry: Financial services
- Founded: 1871
- Defunct: 1931
- Fate: Taken over after financial distress
- Successor: Crédit Industriel d'Alsace et de Lorraine
- Headquarters: Strasbourg, France
- Area served: Alsace–Lorraine

The Banque d'Alsace et de Lorraine (BAL, sometimes referred to as Banque d'Alsace-Lorraine) was a key participant in the idiosyncratic financial ecosystem of Alsace–Lorraine within the German Empire from its establishment in 1871 until World War I. A decade after the war's end, the BAL experienced financial distress and was taken over in 1931 by the Alsatian affiliate of Crédit Industriel et Commercial (CIC), forming the Crédit Industriel d'Alsace et de Lorraine (CIAL).

== History ==
=== German Empire ===
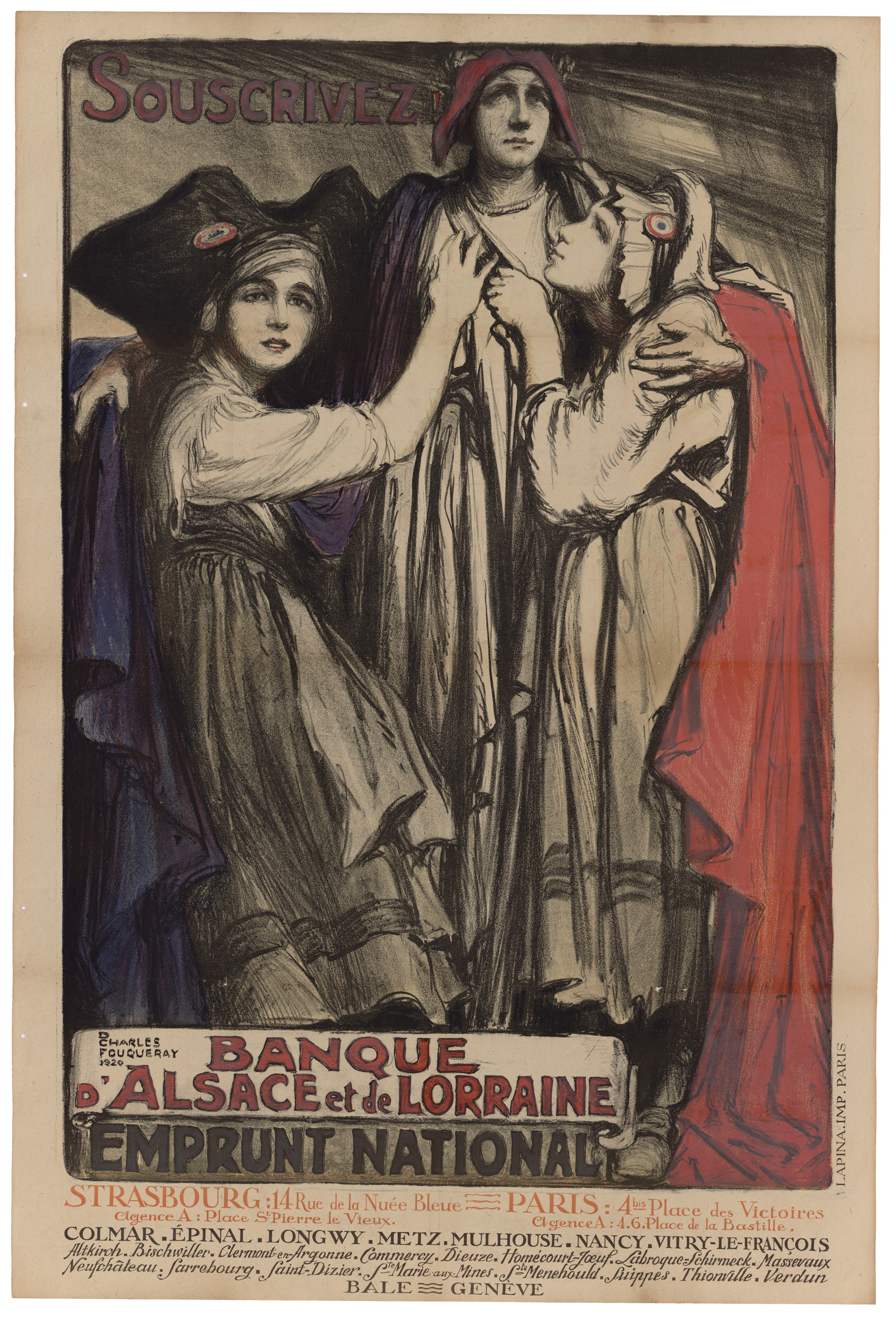
Patriotic poster of the Banque d'Alsace et de Lorraine (1920), with allegories of Alsace and Lorraine supporting France

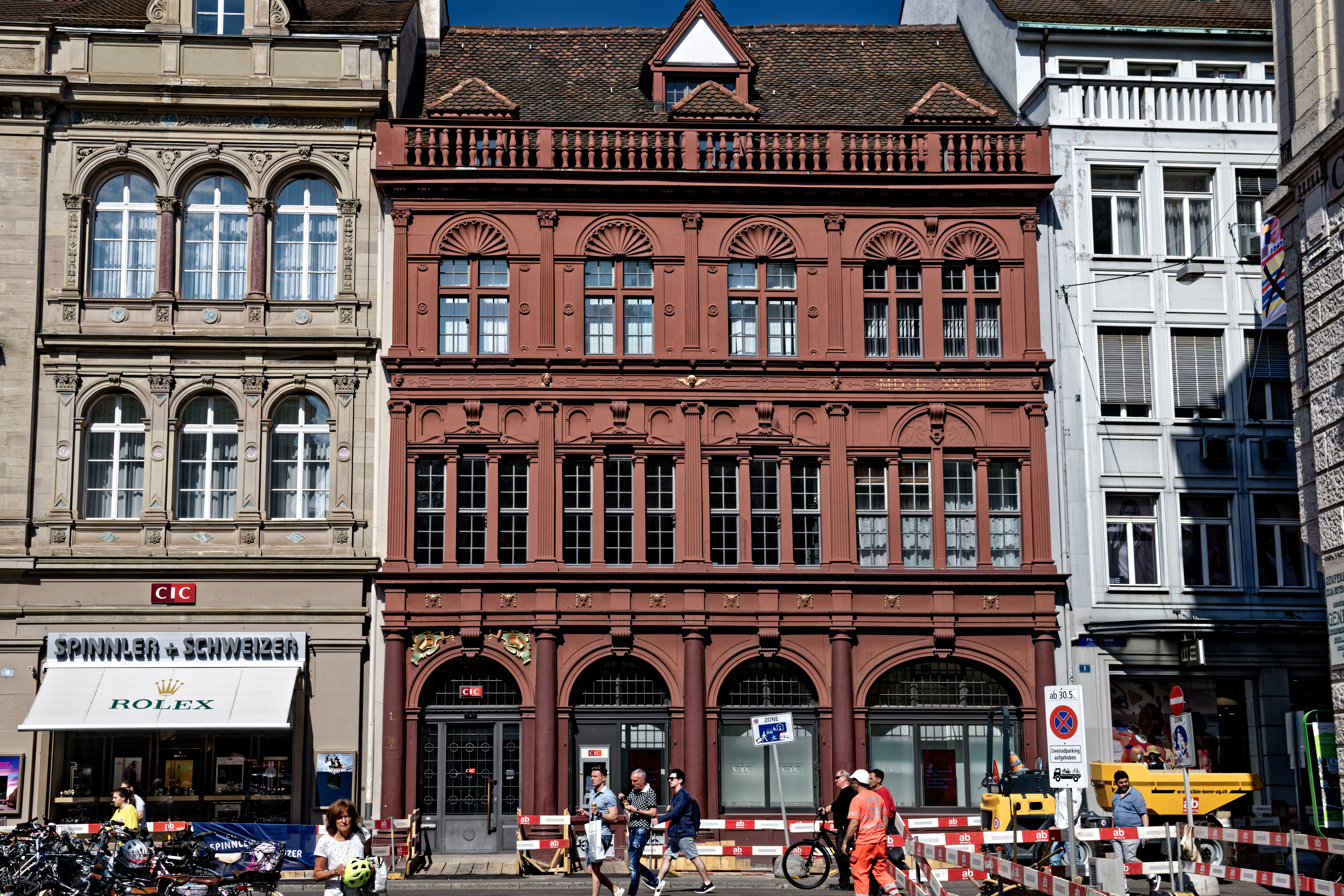
Former head office of Gewerbebank Basel at Marktplatz 13 in Basel, lately head office of Bank CIC Switzerland

The BAL was established shortly following the German conquest of Alsace–Lorraine in the Franco-Prussian War, as a consequence of an initiative of the French government. The latter aimed at maintaining services such as the payment of annuity and pension coupons, which had previously been performed by its local financial office (French: Trésorerie Générale) which the German authorities liquidated on 24 June 1871. For that purpose, the French authorities authorities authorized four small Strasbourg banks (Ed. Klose & Co.; L. Grouvel & Co.; F. Bastien & Co.; and L. Blum-Auscher) to carry out the payments on their behalf. On 1 August 1871, the four banks formed a joint venture that was also enabled to collect deposits on behalf of the French Treasury and provide other services. As it faced a lack of sufficient funding, the joint venture was soon reorganized and became the Banque d'Alsace-Lorraine, established on 16 December 1871. The capital was brought in by a mix of Alsatian and Swiss investors, including one Geneva-based and four Basel-based bankers in its board in addition to representatives of the four founding Alsatian banks as well as two Parisian bankers. The new bank's shares were listed in both Basel and Geneva, and its seat established in the building of the Trésorerie Générale, erected 1844 at 14 rue de la Nuée-Bleue in central Strasbourg.

The BAL opened a branch in Metz in July 1872. It initially provided a key conduit for inhabitants of Alsace-Lorraine to invest in French government debt. In 1881, it expanded across the border to open a branch in Nancy.

Like the other two major Alsatian banks, the Comptoir d'escompte de Mulhouse and the Banque de Mulhouse, the BAL then benefited from the unique position of Alsace-Lorraine, channeling abundant French savings towards the capital-hungry German economy. It demolished the trésorerie building in the 1890s and in 1896 inaugurated its new head office building on the same location, designed by architects Gustave Krafft and Jules Berninger.

In the early 20th century, again like other Alsatian banks, the BAL expanded further into French territory. It opened seven locations in Eastern France in 1909 and 1910, namely a branch in Vitry-le-François and six offices at Verdun, Sainte-Menehould, Longwy, Homécourt, Jœuf, and Saint-Dizier. In 1911 it acquired a small bank in Paris, Prud'hon Plainemaison & Cie. It also ventured in 1909 into Switzerland, by acquiring the Industrial Bank of Basel (German: Gewerbebank Basel AG, French: Banque Industrielle Bâle). The BAL did not expand its retail presence into the German Empire beyond Alsace-Lorraine, even though it had a lot of its asset base there.

=== World War I and aftermath ===
The BAL and other Alsatian banks experienced a bank run in August 1914 following the outbreak of World War I, but withstood it thanks to the Reichsbank's prompt liquidity assistance. During the war, the BAL was cut off from its branches in France and Switzerland. After the war's end, many of its assets in Germany were sharply depreciated. Like other Alsatian banks, it survived thanks to liquidity assistance, this time provided by the French government in 1919 and partly converted into a financial transfer by legislation of June 1922.

On 23 June 1920, the BAL opened a branch on No. 6 Groussgaass, the main thoroughfare of the Ville Haute in Luxembourg. In 1928, it participated through that branch in the creation of the Luxembourg Stock Exchange.

=== Financial distress and rescue ===
The BAL was severely affected by the French banking crisis of 1930, which in turn heralded the European banking crisis of 1931. In January 1931, the Société Alsacienne de Crédit Industriel et Commercial (SACIC, est. 1919 as local affiliate of Paris-based Crédit Industriel et Commercial) took over its operations with support from the French state, including its three foreign branches in Basel, Luxembourg and Saarbrücken. The SACIC simultaneously renamed itself into Crédit Industriel d'Alsace et de Lorraine, or CIAL, and relocated its head office in the BAL's former seat at rue de la Nuée-Bleue. By this transaction, the bank's headcount rose from around 200 for SACIC alone to around 1,000 in the merged CIAL, in which the French government became a minority shareholder in exchange for its financial assistance.

== See also ==
- List of banks in France
