= Banque de Luxembourg =

Bank in Luxembourg

Coordinates: 49.6132°N 6.1257°E

- Main headquarters in Luxembourg City
- Type: Private company
- Industry: Banking; Financial services
- Founded: 1920; 106 years ago
- Headquarters: Boulevard Royal, Luxembourg
- Key people: Eric Charpentier, Chairman; Livia Moretti, CEO
- Products: Private Banking; Asset Management; Business banking
- Net income: €63 mln (2017)
- Total assets: €13,085.6 mln (2017)
- Number of employees: 900
- Subsidiaries: Banque de Luxembourg Investments (BLI); Compagnie Financière de Gestion (CFG); Conventum Asset Management
- Website: www.banquedeluxembourg.com

Banque de Luxembourg (French pronunciation: [bɑ̃k də lyksɑ̃buʁ], lit. 'Bank of Luxembourg') is a financial institution in Luxembourg, which primarily focuses on wealth management and high-net-worth individuals. It is owned by the French banking group Crédit Mutuel, through the group's subsidiary Crédit Industriel et Commercial (CIC).

The bank's origins go back to the 1920 opening of the Luxembourg branch of the Strasbourg-based Banque d'Alsace et de Lorraine (BAL), which in 1931 became the Crédit Industriel d'Alsace et de Lorraine (CIAL), by then a CIC affiliate; and to the separate establishment in 1937 of Banque Mathieu Frères in Luxembourg, which CIAL took over in 1969-1971 and renamed Banque du Luxembourg in 1978. Banque de Luxembourg then absorbed CIAL's Luxembourg branch in 1991.

== History ==
The BAL opened its Luxembourg branch on 23 June 1920 at No. 6 Groussgaass, the main thoroughfare of the Ville Haute in Luxembourg. In 1928, it participated through that branch in the creation of the Luxembourg Stock Exchange, and in 1939, its successor CIAL Luxembourg was a founding member of the Association des Banques et Banquiers Luxembourg (ABBL).

In 1937, the Banque Mathieu Frères was founded as a family bank, by brothers Ambroise Jacques Mathieu and Marie-Eugène Mathieu.

During World War II, CIAL's operations in German-annexed Luxembourg were integrated into the Banque Générale du Luxembourg, the former local affiliate of the Société Générale de Belgique which had been forcibly transferred to Deutsche Bank. In the wake of the liberation of Luxembourg in 1944, the CIAL recovered its former operations. It was temporarily hosted by the Caisse de pension des employés privés, and relocated back to its former location at 6 Groussgaass in 1946.

In 1969, the CIAL took a 30 percent stake in Luxembourg-based Banque Mathieu Frères, and raised it to 100 percent in 1971. In May 1977, the CIAL reorganized Banque Mathieu Frères and subsequently renamed it the Banque de Luxembourg, in which Deutsche Bank and its affiliated Saarländische Kreditbank took minority stakes.

In 1991, the Banque de Luxembourg took over the CIAL's own branch in Luxembourg, which had remained separate until then, and became the Grand-Duchy's fifth-largest bank by total assets. By 1997, 42 percent of the CIAL's total profits came from Luxembourg, 42 percent from France, and 26 percent from Switzerland.

The bank opened its new head office at 14 Boulevard Royal in 1994. In 1999, Banque de Luxembourg launched Fund-Market S.A., an independent fund adviser. Fund-Market's products and services were integrated into the Bank's offer in 2010.

In 2002, the Crédit Mutuel-owned CIC purchased Deutsche Bank's 29 percent stake in the Banque de Luxembourg and became its sole owner. In 2005, the creation of Banque de Luxembourg Fund Research & Asset Management (BL FR&AM) brought together the bank's investment analytical and management expertise. In 2010, Banque de Luxembourg opened two branches in Belgium, aiming to meet the needs of clients from the Belgian province of Luxembourg.

== Shareholder structure ==
Banque de Luxembourg is a wholly owned subsidiary of CIC, itself 93 percent-owned by the Banque Fédérative du Crédit Mutuel (BFCM), a central entity of the bancassurance group Crédit Mutuel Alliance Fédérale.

== Branches ==
Banque de Luxembourg from the Boulevard Royal

Designed by Bernardo Fort-Brescia, from the architectural practice Arquitectonica in Miami, the bank's head office was inaugurated in 1994. An extension was completed in 2011. The building houses the Bank's Luxembourg-based sales teams. The support and back office teams are located at the administrative headquarters in Howald.

In Belgium, the bank's two private banking centers in Brussels and in Ghent provide fully fledged private banking services to wealthy local residents.

== See also ==
- List of banks in Luxembourg
