= Albert Bayona i Fernández =

Albert Bayona
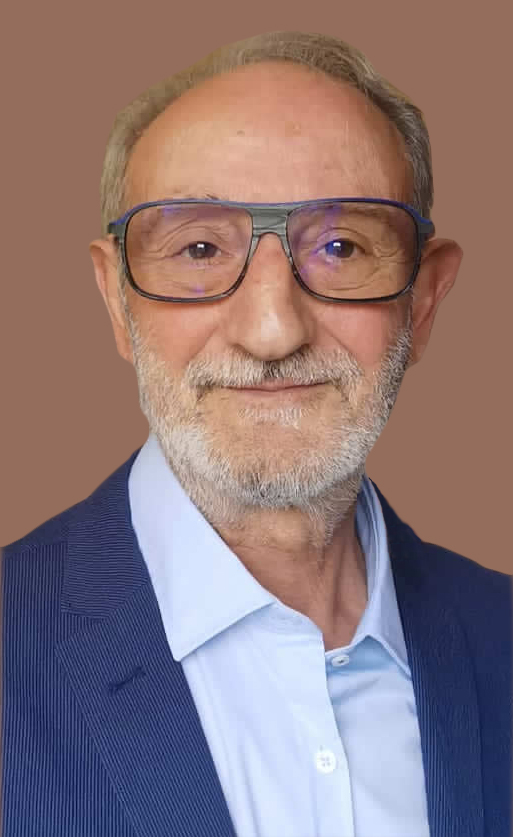
- Bayona in 2021
- Born: 1954 (age 71–72); Lleida, Spain
- Known for: Painting, Digital art, Video art
- Notable work: Monday to Friday
- Children: Nestor Bayona
- Awards: Vasudha Award (2008)
- Website: www.albertbayona.com

Albert Bayona i Fernández (Lleida, 1954) is a Spanish visual artist, cultural promoter, and professor, originally trained as a draftsman-designer. Recognised as one of the most solid contemporary figures of his city, he began his artistic career in the mid-1980s, integrating a wide range of disciplines into his work, including painting, drawing, photography, video, digital technologies, and music. In 1985, he was awarded second prize in the 24th Joan Miró International Drawing Prize, and in 2008 he received the Vasudha Award. One of his works, Variacions sobre una estètica racional (1986), has been selected to feature on Google Arts & Culture.

== Education ==
Trained as a draftsman-designer, Bayona attended classes with Leandre Cristòfol Peralba and Víctor Pérez Pallarés at the School of the Circle of Fine Arts.

== Career ==
In 1985, he settled permanently in Lleida where he has devoted himself to teaching at the Municipal School of Fine Arts (now the Leandre Cristòfol Municipal School of Art), of which he was director between 1995 and 2000.

His work incorporates different disciplines: painting, drawing, photography, video, digital technologies, and music.

Between 1986 and 2000, Bayona participated in the organisation of editions of the Entrega Grants awarded by the Department of Culture of the Lleida to new creators; he directed the artistic programming of the Periferiart Gallery and the municipal exhibition halls of Roser and Sant Joan, coordinated the Montesquiu Workshops in Lleida, and carried out functions as co-director of the Lleida Animation Film Festival Animac.

== Style ==
After establishing himself as a painter, Bayona explored digital art and new technologies. His work is linked to music and cinema and reflects on the mechanisms of deception and perception in cinema. His work incorporates painting, drawing, photography, video, digital technologies, and music.

== Exhibitions ==
His works have been presented, either individually or collectively, in spaces such as the Museo d'Arte Contemporanea MACRO, the Taipei Fine Arts, the Centre d'Art La Panera, the Museu d'Art Jaume Morera, the CentroCentro Cibeles, the PetitGaleria, the Hangar Centre for Production and Research, ACVIC, the Centre for Contemporary Arts Glasgow, the Ex-New Centre for Contemporary Art of Sulbiate, the Arts Santa Mònica Centre, the Torrance Art Museum or the Fundació Marguerida de Montferrato.

Bayona's works have been featured in fairs and festivals, such as ARCO, Videoformes, Split International Festival, LOOP Festival, Athens Digital Arts Festival, Madatac, Muces Muestra de Cine Europeo, FILE Video Art or the Open Panoràmic.

His works are part of the National Collection of Contemporary Art of the Generalitat de Catalunya, the catalogue of the video art distributor HAMACA, and the holdings of the library and documentation centre of the Reina Sofía Museum.

== Recognition ==
- Second prize in the "XXIV Joan Miró International Drawing Prize" (Fundació Joan Miró) (1985) for Variations on a Rational Aesthetic
- Vasudha Award for Best Short Film on the Environment at the International Film Festival of India-Goa (2008) for Monday to Friday.
- Accésit in the VII Video Art Prize of El Almacén de las Artes in Astillero, Cantabria (2014).
- Cosmonaut was selected to be part of the official section of the Muestra de Arte Audiovisual Digital y Tecnologías Contemporáneas (MADATAC) (2016)
- Special Mention of the Jury at the Samskara International Film Festival (2021) for Pietro 8
- Outstanding Achievement Award at the World Film Carnival in Singapore and at TIFF. Tagore International Film Festival in Bolpur, India. (2021) for Pandèmia
- Award at the 68th edition of the Calcutta International Cult Film Festival (2022) for Pandèmia
- Critics’ Prize at the Russian Institute of Cinema (2023) for Framed Triggers
- Best Experimental Film Award at the Swedish Academy of Motion Picture Awards (2023) for Framed Triggers
- Best Experimental Film Award at the Berlin Motion Picture Awards (BMPA) (2023) for Framed Triggers
- Best Experimental Film Award at the Toronto International Filmmakers' Festival. (2023) for Framed Triggers
