= SIX Group =

Swiss financial infrastructure

SIX Group Ltd.
- Type: Consortium-owned AG
- Industry: Financial services
- Founded: 2008
- Headquarters: Zurich, Switzerland
- Key people: Bjørn Sibbern (CEO) & Thomas Wellauer (Chairman)
- Operating income: SFr 1.5 billion (2023)
- Owner: 120 Swiss and non-Swiss financial institutions
- Number of employees: 4,024 FTE (as of December 2023)
- Subsidiaries: SIX Swiss Exchange; SIX Financial Information; Bolsas y Mercados Españoles
- Website: six-group.com

SIX is a financial market infrastructure company in Switzerland. The company provides services relating to securities transactions, the processing of financial information, payment transactions and is building a digital infrastructure. The company name SIX is an abbreviation and stands for Swiss Infrastructure and Exchange. SIX is globally active, with its headquarters in Zurich.

== Company history ==
=== 1930: Foundation of Ticker AG and subscription to the new stock exchange ===
Ticker AG in Zurich was founded with the purpose of transmitting stock market prices. It was the predecessor of Telekurs AG, which later merged with other companies to form SIX.

With the opening of the new exchange, the ticker system also began to broadcast. This stock exchange ticker, one of the first on the European continent and a special application of the local telegraph, transmitted the Zurich stock exchange prices, the closing prices of other Swiss and important foreign stock exchanges in italics on a narrow strip of paper to any number of recipients.

=== 1961: stock exchange television ===
Ticker AG introduced the first stock exchange television ever and aroused media interest with this novelty: The prices of up to ninety stocks could be followed on screen. The Neue Zürcher Zeitung described stock exchange television as a world first and devoted a technology supplement to this technical development.

Ticker AG changed its name to Telekurs AG.

=== 1987: Commissioning Swiss Interbank Clearing (SIC) ===
The new online clearing system was based on a central computer system at Telekurs with online access for participants. Primarily, only payments in Swiss francs are processed.

=== 1993: Foundation of the Swiss Stock Exchange ===
The stock exchanges in Geneva, Basel and Zurich merged to form the Swiss Exchange.

=== 1995: Electronic stock exchange trading and Swiss Value Chain ===
The Swiss Exchange launched electronic stock exchange trading with integrated settlement and custody and discontinued ring trading the following year. The prerequisite for this step was a link to the SECOM System for SEGA and to the interbank payment system SIC, which operated Telekurs.

=== 1999: euroSIC internationalizes payments ===
The clearing system for euro payments, euroSIC, began operations and provided the Swiss banks with access to the European payment systems. SEGA merged with INTERSETTLE to form the SIS Group. INTERSETTLE was previously responsible for securities settlement downstream of stock exchange trading.

=== 2001: SIS acquires the world's most important collection of historical securities and establishes a foundation ===
The opening of the Wertpapierwelt in Olten as the first museum for historical securities followed in July 2003, and today the exhibition can be seen at the Swiss Finance Museum in Zurich.

=== 2005: Cartel law proceedings ===
In 2005, SIX Multipay Ltd launched a DCC function (dynamic currency conversion), which was only available on the payment card terminals of SIX Card Solutions Ltd. The Commission of Competition (Weko) intervened and accused the SIX subsidiary of abusing its dominant position. In December 2006, SIX Multipay Ltd also made the DCC function available to other terminal providers and disclosed the interface information. Four years later, the Weko imposed a fine of seven million Swiss francs on SIX.

=== 2008: Merger and change of name ===
The SWX Group, SIS Group and Telekurs Group merged on 1 January to form Swiss Financial Markets Services AG. The company thus covered the business areas of securities trading, stock exchange transactions, financial information and payment transactions.

On 21 August 2008, Swiss Financial Markets Services Ltd was renamed SIX Group Ltd.

=== 2016: Mobile payment with Twint ===
Together with various Swiss banks, SIX launched and established the mobile payment solution TWINT.

=== 2018: Partnership with Worldline ===
SIX entered into a strategic partnership with Worldline. Worldline acquired SIX Payment Services and SIX holds a 27% stake in Worldline.

=== 2020: Purchase of Bolsas y Mercados Españoles (BME) ===
SIX finalised the purchase of the Spanish BME in 2020.

=== 2024: Acquisition of FactEntry ===
On March 27, 2024, SIX acquired a majority stake in FactEntry, a global provider of fixed income reference data, analytics, and solutions for financial market participants.

=== 2025: Acquisition of Aquis Exchange ===
In July 2025, SIX completed its acquisition of Aquis Exchange, a European financial markets operator and financial technology provider headquartered in London, in a deal valued at approximately £207 million. Following the acquisition, SIX and Aquis had access to 16 capital markets across Europe and roughly 15% of the region’s equity trading activity. The deal was first reported in November 2024.

== Services (selection) ==
=== Securities trading via SIX Swiss Exchange ===
SIX operates the Swiss Stock Exchange. The core functions of SIX Swiss Exchange are the admission of securities, the operation of the trading platform, the monitoring of trading and the distribution of market information. Shares, bonds, derivatives, investment funds and certificates, among others, are traded on the joint trading platform of the SIX Swiss Exchange and SIX Structured Products Exchange.

As an independent unit within SIX, Exchange Regulation assumes all tasks within the framework of the self-regulation provided for by the Stock Exchange Act. The unit is separate from the operational business and issues rules for issuers and participants, monitors trading and enforces the rules.

=== Post-trade settlement and other securities services ===
Once an exchange trade has taken place, SIX takes over all subsequent processes. The SIX Securities Services division acts as a counterparty between trading parties throughout Europe (central counterparty). This service serves to reduce the risks of both buyers and sellers (clearing). Thereafter, SIX settles the transactions electronically (settlement). This includes real-time payments from one bank to another.

SIX also operates systems that protect assets and documents from unauthorized access (custody). The company acts as the central securities depository for Switzerland in this area. It holds in safe custody most of the financial instruments issued under Swiss law. SIX also offers its custody service for foreign securities.

The «Securities Services» division also includes platforms for direct debits and e-bills as well as the electronic information portal for land register data in Switzerland. It is called Terravis and enables mortgage, property and commercial register transactions.

=== SIX Interbank Clearing ===
SIX Interbank Clearing AG (before November 2008: Swiss Interbank Clearing AG), based in Zürich, Switzerland, is a subsidiary of SIX Group. Since 1987 SIX Interbank Clearing has operated on behalf of the Swiss National Bank a payment platform for the processing of domestic and international payments (clearing) in Swiss francs and, since the introduction of the euro, also of payments in euros. This platform - which includes the Swiss Interbank Clearing system for francs and Swiss Euro Clearing Bank (euroSIC) for euros - connects virtually all Swiss financial institutions and a number of banks outside Switzerland. This makes it possible for financial institutions worldwide to handle electronic payments in euros and Swiss francs in Switzerland around the clock in real time.

SIX Interbank Clearing also participates in various committees to standardize national and international payments (IBAN and SEPA) and maintains the tables, history and ongoing discussion for ISO 4217, the ISO standard that defines international currency codes.

=== Swiss Euro Clearing Bank ===
The Swiss Euro Clearing Bank or SECB is a special-purpose bank based in Frankfurt, Germany, whose role is to facilitate transactions in euros by banks in Switzerland and Liechtenstein. It is the centerpiece of the euroSIC system, which is the euro counterpart to the Swiss Interbank Clearing (SIC) system for transactions in Swiss francs.

SECB was established in 1998 and started operations on 1 January 1999, the same day as the euro was introduced as single currency of 11 member states of the EU. It settles transactions in euros that are processed on the SIC system, thanks to its access to the TARGET Services platform of the Eurosystem.

Use of SECB is not obligatory. In the mid-2000s, UBS preferred to process transactions in euro via its own direct access to the German real-time gross settlement system, which was subsequently replaced by TARGET2.

Originally owned by several Swiss financial sector participants, SECB has been a fully owned by SIX Group since 2018.

=== Financial information ===
Within the business unit Financial Information, SIX obtains real-time financial data from foreign stock exchanges and companies and distributes it further. This includes basic information on listed companies (reference data) and information on measures affecting the capital and voting rights of shareholders (corporate actions). In addition, SIX clients can keep up to date on prices and market rates for around 15 million financial instruments. In addition, SIX calculates indices such as the Swiss Market Index (SMI) or the Swiss Bond Indices (SBI). Based on SIX financial data, banks and other market participants decide on financial transactions and assess investment risks.

=== Cashless payment transactions ===
SIX processes mobile payment as well as credit card, debit card and prepaid card payments in Switzerland, Austria and Luxembourg as well as in many other European countries. SIX also enables fiat money to be withdrawn from ATM. With its infrastructure, SIX also creates the necessary secure conditions for hotel, catering and retail to be able to make and accept payments online or at POS terminal using mobile payment methods and payment cards. In Austria, SIX occasionally issued payment cards itself. SIX Payment Services AG was sold in 2018 to Worldline.

== Owner ==
SIX is owned by around 120 national and foreign financial institutions, which are also the main users of its services. The company is not listed on the stock exchange.

== Initiatives ==
SIX supports the Swiss Finance Museum (formerly Wertpapierwelt in Olten). The museum presents a multimedia exhibition on the origins of the economic system and the importance of the Swiss financial market and its infrastructure.

SIX is a founding member of the FinTech Incubator and Accelerator F10. Here, for example, SIX employees work together with start-ups to further develop financial technology in Switzerland. SIX intends to offer an open banking hub for business customers before the end of 2019. Among others, the two accounting software providers Abacus and Klara will use the Hub. Banks can also open their IT interface to the hub. UBS, Credit Suisse, Zürcher Kantonalbank, Valiant Bank as well as Raiffeisen Schweiz participate at the project.
