= Swiss Interbank Clearing =

Payment clearing system

The Swiss Interbank Clearing (SIC) system is a mechanism for the clearing of domestic and international payments.

== History ==
The development of the SIC started in 1980. Since 1987, the SIC system has been operated by SIX Interbank Clearing (100% owned by the SIX Group) on behalf of the Swiss National Bank (SNB). 12 Swiss banks participated in the launch. The SIC was one of the first real-time gross settlement system operating worldwide, following Cedel launched in 1970.

In 1990, different priorities were introduced. In March 1995, the system was connected to the Secom system to reduce transaction risks. In 1996, the Swiss Stock Exchange became an electronic trading platform, and the system SWX was developed to link it to the SIC. The repo platform was introduced in 1998, and the settlement of checks was launched in 2000.

In 1998, the SNB loosened the conditions to participate to the SIC, allowing non-banks to become participants. A remote access to the system was also allowed to international subsidiaries and joint-ventures. A year later, 63 out of 291 participants were not banks. 556,000 transactions were settled on an average day in 1999 (average total value of 170 billion francs).

In 2016, the SIC developed a new ISO 20022-compliant software system for its clearing services. By 2018, the new system was rolled out to all banks in Switzerland, and further international development of the standard was planned.

In 2019, the Swiss National Bank launched a new service to clear digital currency transactions, and developed its own blockchain-based digital currency to make this service interoperable with the SIC. The service, which aims to incorporate virtual central bank funds into a distributed ledger technology, was first launched in Switzerland, Singapore and Hong Kong. Fintech startups have access to this service if they have a legal fintech licence and a business model that revolves around payments.

== Description ==
By 2018, 325 financial institutions (national and international) participated in the SIC. The system processes an average of 2.4 million transactions every day with an average daily total value of CHF 156 billion. The majority of cashless transactions in Switzerland are settled through the SIC.

== See also ==
- SIX Interbank Clearing
- Swiss Euro Clearing Bank
- Swiss National Bank
- Clearing house (finance)
