= Geneva University of Music =

Music institution in Geneva, Switzerland

Coordinates: 46°12′04″N 6°08′34″E

Haute école de musique de Genève
- Haute école de musique de Genève
- Type: University of Applied Sciences
- Established: 1835 as Conservatoire de musique de Genève
- Affiliations: University of Applied Sciences Western Switzerland (HES-SO)
- Director: Béatrice Zawodnik
- Students: +650
- Location: Geneva, Switzerland
- Website: http://www.hesge.ch/hem

The Haute école de musique de Genève (Geneva University of Music, HEM) is a public university of applied sciences specializing in music education located in Geneva, Switzerland.

== Status ==
The HEM is a foundation established under public law in 2009. It is part of the Music and Performing Arts Department of the University of Applied Sciences Western Switzerland (HES-SO). Its mandate includes teaching at Bachelor's and Master's level, artistic research, continuing education for professional musicians, and artistic performances and productions. The HEM has a decentralised teaching site in Neuchâtel. Its Bachelor's and Master's programmes are accredited by the Swiss Confederation. The institution is ranked 51-100 globally in the QS World University Rankings by Subject for Performing Arts.

== History ==
Between 2007 and 2009, a process brought together the professional courses offered by the Conservatoire de musique de Genève, the Institut Jaques-Dalcroze and the Conservatoire de musique neuchâtelois into a single foundation under public law, which was subsequently attached to the HES-SO-Genève. Since its establishment, the HEM has organized hundreds of public events and collaborations with partners in Switzerland and internationally. Recent productions include Rachid Ouramdane's Outsider at the Grand Théâtre (Geneva) (3-5 May 2024). The HEM enrolls over 600 students from all five continents, with approximately 100 studying at the Neuchâtel campus. The students are supervised by around a hundred professors and guest lecturers, all of whom are active in artistic and academic life.

== Geneva site ==
The buildings that house the HEM’s activities are located in the heart of the city, in the immediate vicinity of cultural institutions and large concert halls (Grand-Théâtre de Genève, Victoria Hall, Bâtiment des forces motrices, Centre du Grütli). The main building at rue du Général Dufour 2 occupies the former École de Commerce (1901–1917), designed by Jacques-Élysée Goss, who also designed the Grand-Théâtre de Genève. It was then occupied successively by the École des Beaux-Arts and the HEAD (1969-2021). It currently houses several concert halls, including a black box, a space dedicated to world music, a cinema and numerous classrooms. The Salle de la Bourse at rue du Grütli 5 is housed in the former Geneva Stock Exchange building, renovated by Goss (1915–1986) and converted into an audition room and lecture theatres. The neighbouring buildings on rue Petitot 8-10 house, among other things, the Centre de musique électroacoustique and part of the Early Music department. There are also classrooms at rue du Stand 58. The Percussion Centre is located under the Uni-Mail esplanade (boulevard du Pont-d'Arve 40).

== Neuchâtel site ==
Built in the new Ecoparc district, the HEM Neuchâtel site occupies one of the two buildings of the Campus-Arc designed by Bauart and inaugurated on 15 and 16 May 2009. It is equipped with two auditoriums, a library, a cafeteria and numerous work and meeting spaces. The HEM's Neuchâtel site shares its premises with the Conservatoire de musique neuchâtelois and the Haute école de gestion Arc. In December 2017, the Council of State of Neuchâtel expressed its desire to close the Neuchâtel branch of the Geneva School of Music. This decision was overturned when the Grand Council accepted the popular legislative initiative "Pour le maintien d'une formation musicale professionnelle dans le canton de Neuchâtel" on 18 February 2020, securing the campus's future.

== Cité de la Musique ==
A Cité de la Musique project at the Place des Nations in Geneva was launched in September 201315 with the support of a private foundation. The new building was intended to house the HEM and the Orchestre de la Suisse romande. In autumn 2017, an architectural competition selected the proposal by the offices of P.-A. Dupraz and G. Byrne. The project sparked a wide-ranging debate that culminated in a vote on 13 June 202116 on the "Cité de la musique" localised neighbourhood plan (PLQ 30134), which was rejected, resulting in the project being abandoned.

== New infrastructure project ==
In autumn 2022, a new project was launched to create a building entirely dedicated to the HEM on the former premises of Radio-Télévision Suisse, which could house all the activities of the Geneva campus.

== Academic structures ==
The HEM's curriculum spans from medieval music, taught within the Early Music Department, to contemporary composition.

The HEM has six departments, covering all aspects of the music profession.

- Department of keyboard instruments
- Orchestral Instruments Department
- Vocal Department
- Early Music Department
- Music and Movement Department
- Music Culture and Theoretical Studies Department
- Creation Department

The HEM runs a full symphony orchestra, several chamber orchestras, a baroque orchestra, a choir, a chamber choir and a contemporary ensemble.

== Courses ==
In line with the structures of the European educational area, basic education is organised into two cycles of study: the three-year Bachelor of Arts cycle and the two-year Master of Arts cycle. A wide range of courses are offered in the six streams:

- BA in Music
- BA in Music and Movement
- MA in Music Education
- MA in Music Performance
- MA in Specialised Music Performance
- MA in Composition and Theory
- MA in Ethnomusicology (in partnership with the University of Geneva and the University of Neuchâtel)
- MA in Music Project Creation

== Research ==
Since 2004, the HEM has initiated more than 80 applied research projects on subjects that cover most areas of artistic practice (creation and new technologies, historically informed performance, art and science, intercultural dialogue, music pedagogy, music professions, etc.) and have led to numerous collaborations with partners in Switzerland and around the world. In order to disseminate the results of its research projects, the HEM has created several collections of scientific works: "Musique à Genève" (in collaboration with the University of Geneva), "Musique & Recherche" (distributed by Librairie Droz), "Musique & Matières" (in collaboration with L'Œil d'or). The HEM has also published CDs in collaboration with several record labels: Claves Records, B Records and Ricercar. The HEM is home to the Institut de recherche en musique et arts de la scène (IRMAS), which brings together the HEM, the Haute école de musique de Lausanne (HEMU) and La Manufacture - HETSR (Haute école de théâtre de Suisse romande).

== Partnerships ==
The HEM maintains partnerships with several institutions, including:

- University of Geneva (cross-teaching services with the musicology unit, bachelor's degree in music and musicology, social and cultural services)
- University of Neuchâtel (MA in ethnomusicology)
- Orchestre de la Suisse romande
- Orchestre de chambre de Genève
- Ensemble de musique contemporaine Contrechamps (orchestral academies, professional integration courses).
- Grand Théâtre de Genève
- Geneva International Music Competition
