= SWX Europe =

Former electronic trading platform

SWX Europe, formerly virt-x (virt-x Exchange Limited) and Tradepoint, was an electronic cross-border share trading platform that operated between 1995 and 2009. In 2009 all business was transferred to its owner SIX Swiss Exchange.

== History ==
Tradepoint Investment Exchange was founded by three former employees of London Stock Exchange in 1995. It was an order-driven market, and was known as Tradepoint. As a Recognised Investment Exchange (RIE) based in London, it was supervised by the UK's Financial Services Authority (FSA).

In late 2002, it became the subject of a takeover offer by the Swiss exchange, SWX. The sale was completed and at that point it became a wholly owned subsidiary of that group. To reflect the new owner the name was changed to Virt-x which was short for virtual exchange.

In early 2008, virt-x formally changed its name to SWX Europe.

As of 30 April 2009, SWX Europe ceased trading and all business was transferred to SIX Swiss Exchange.
