= Nestor Bayona =

Spanish conductor (born 1985)

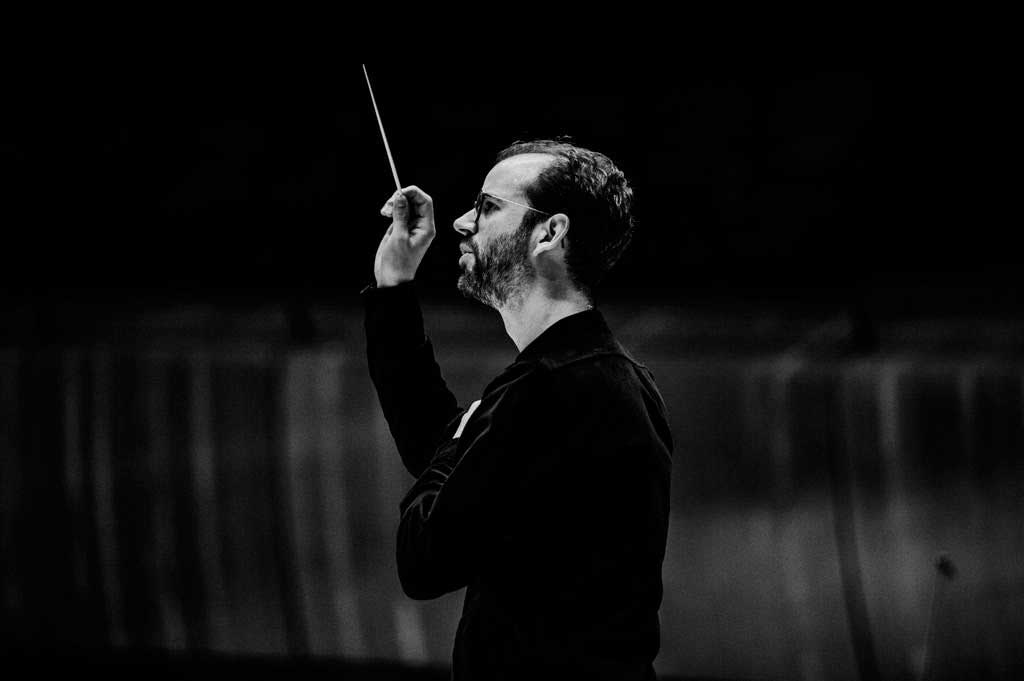
- Born: December 10, 1985 (age 40); Lleida, Spain
- Education: Royal Northern College of Music; Geneva University of Music; Berlin University of the Arts
- Occupation: Conductor

Nestor Bayona (born 10 December 1985) is a Spanish conductor. He was appointed in 2023 as Resident Conductor at the Polish National Radio Symphony Orchestra, after serving as the orchestra’s assistant conductor. He is a frequent guest conductor at the Castile and León Symphony Orchestra, the Orquesta Sinfónica del Principado de Asturias, RTVE Symphony Orchestra, the Transylvania State Philharmonic Orchestra and the Opéra de Marseille, Teatro de la Zarzuela, Silesian Opera and the Teatro Campoamor.

== Life and career ==
Born in Lleida, Nestor Bayona began his career as a pianist, training at the Conservatory de Lleida at the age of 6. He then moved to the Royal Northern College of Music in Manchester, where he studied Piano with Helen Krizos, before continuing onto the Geneva University of Music to study piano with Nelson Goerner and then conducting with Laurent Gay. He went on to pursue a postgraduate diploma in conducting at the Berlin University of the Arts with Steven Sloane.

In seasons 2018/19 and 2021/22, Nestor Bayona served as assistant conductor to Lawrence Foster at the Opéra de Marseille after the recommendation of Daniel Barenboim. In the 2019/20 and 2020/21 seasons, he was assistant conductor to Lawrence Foster again and then to Marin Alsop at the Polish National Radio Symphony Orchestra. He was also assistant to Henrik Nánási at the Liceu, to Steven Sloane at the Komische Oper Berlin, and assisted in productions of Debussy’s Pelléas et Mélisande and Berg’s Lulu at the George Enescu Festival, as well as Penderecki’s Die schwarze Maske at the Grand Theatre, Warsaw.

Néstor Bayona has made his debuts at the Palau de la Música Catalana with the Orquestra del Reial Cercle Artístic de Barcelona, as well as at the Liceu as part of the OH!PÈRA initiative. In 2019, he also made his official conducting debut at the Berliner Philharmonie with the Deutsch-Skandinavische Jugend-Philharmonie and at the Festival de La Roque-d'Anthéron with the soloist David Kadouch and the Orchestre Philharmonique de Marseille, which was broadcast live on France Musique. More recently, he has conducted zarzuela productions such as La corte del faraón at the Festival de Teatro Lírico Español, La Gran Vía at the Teatro de la Zarzuela, and Luisa Fernanda at the Festiwal im. Jana Kiepury, as well as operas including Cavalleria rusticana and Pagliacci at the Cluj-Napoca Hungarian Opera.

As a conductor, Nestor Bayona also has experience in composing. During the pandemic, he re-orchestrated Verdi's Luisa Miller for a reduced ensemble of 20 musicians. He has also worked closely with Marin Alsop during her Japan tour with the Polish National Radio Symphony Orchestra in September 2022 as well as her conducting masterclasses in Katowice.

== Awards ==
- In December 2022, Nestor Bayona was awarded Associate Member of the Royal Northern College of Music, presided by Sir John Tomlinson (bass) for his achievements as a musician
- In 2015, Nestor Bayona was awarded the Ciutat de Lleida International Award for his cultural contribution to his hometown
