= Swiss Bond Index =

Bond index calculated by SIX Swiss Exchange

- Foundation: 1 January 2007
- Operator: SIX Swiss Exchange
- Exchanges: SIX Swiss Exchange
- Trading symbol: SBR14T
- Constituents: 1437 (as of September 30, 2019)
- Market cap: CHF 416.610 billion (nominal, end 2017)
- Weighting method: Market-value-weighted,
- Related indices: Swiss Market Index, Swiss Performance Index
- Website: six-group.com
- ISIN: CH0027441887
- Reuters: .SBR14T
- Bloomberg: SBR14T:IND

The Swiss Bond Index (SBI) is a bond index which tracks fixed-rate, investment-grade obligations emitted in Swiss Francs, the currency of the Swiss Confederation. The index is calculated by SIX Swiss Exchange.

It includes all the bonds emitted in CHF that meet inclusion criteria on maturity, issue size and rating. The SBI and its subindices are notably used in investment portfolios such as exchange-traded funds (ETFs) that track the CHF bond market.

The SBI was introduced on 1 January 2007, with a baseline value of 100 points as of this date. It peaked above 146 in the Summer of 2019, before breaking its previous drawdown record, having lost more than 16% in June 2022 during the 2021–2022 inflation surge.

In 2020, four SBI sub-indices, along with other SIX indices, were endorsed under the EU Benchmarks Regulation and are registered in ESMA, which means that they can be used as an underlying for financial products sold in the EU.

In 2021, SIX additionally launched a series of ESG Bond Indices, which only include bonds of issuers which fulfil certain minimum ESG criteria.

== Constituents ==
The index contains all bonds that fulfill the following criteria:

- The issue size must be at least 100,000,000 CHF.
- The coupon must be fixed, i.e., bonds with variable rates are not accepted.
- The term to maturity must be of at least one year, as debt below one year is usually classified by the financial community as money market.
- The composite rating must be at the minimum BBB, the maximum being AAA. To determine the rating, several rating agencies are considered. If several agencies rate a bond, the rating must exceed BBB or its equivalent for all agencies.

== Subindices ==
The SBI is also subdivided into subindices that cover various composite ratings, various maturities as well as various kinds of issuers, in particular: Domestic Government (Swiss Confederation, rated AAA), Domestic Non-Government, Foreign Government, Foreign Corporate, Foreign Supranational.

The SBI and its subindices exist as total-return indices as well as price indices.

== Historical values ==
These are the historical values of the complete index (SBI AAA-BBB Total Return).

(Closing price)	Value	Date
Calibration	100.00	January 1, 2007
Minimum (all times)	96.73	July 9, 2007
Maximum (all times)	146.61	August 15, 2019
Maximum drawdown	-16.82% (146.61 to 121.95)	August 15, 2019 to June 21, 2022
