= Basel Stock Exchange =

The Basel Stock Exchange was a stock exchange in Basel, Switzerland, between 1866 and 1993, where it merged into SWX Swiss Exchange.

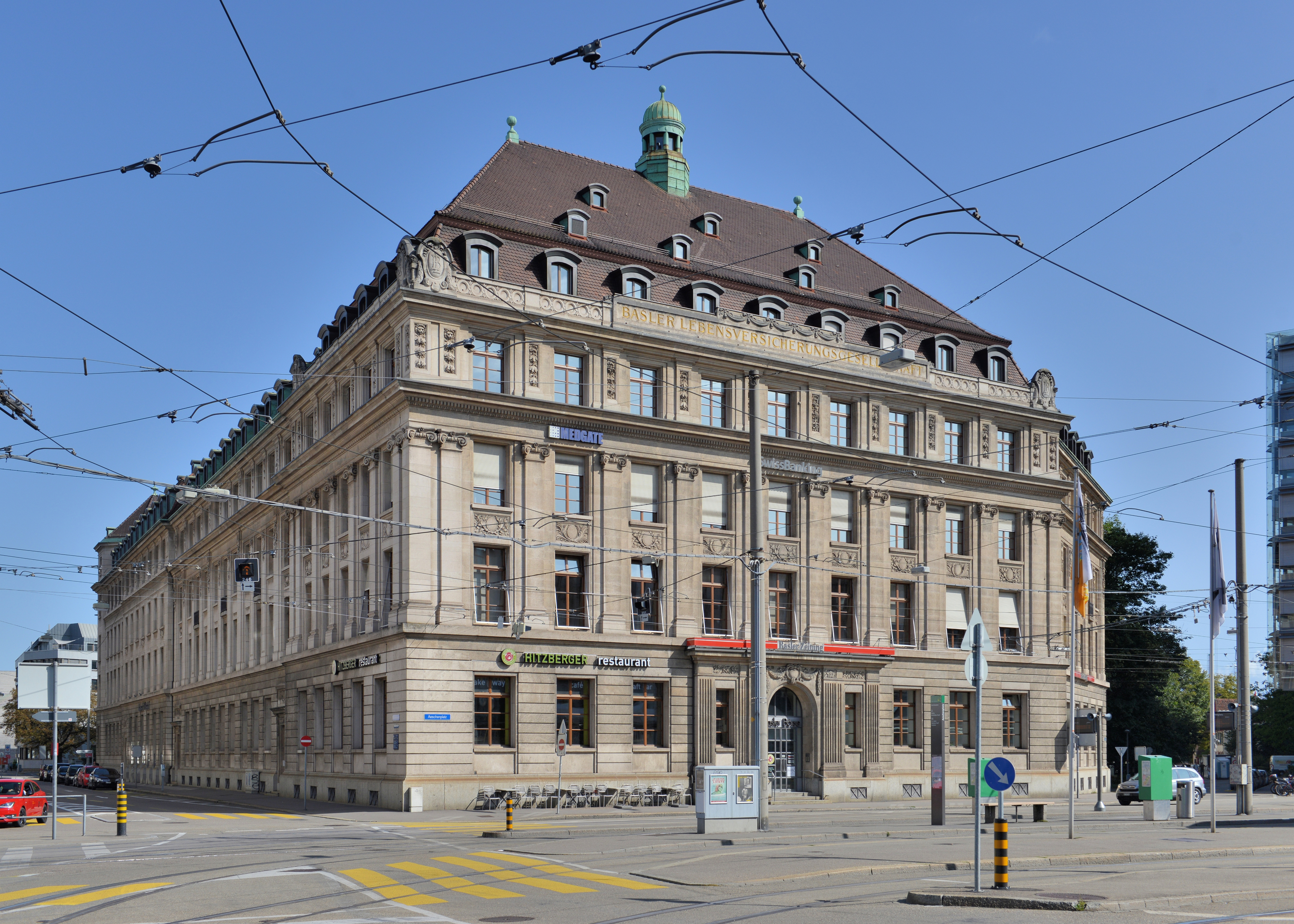
Basel Stock Exchange building at the Aeschenplatz

It had two homes: the original Alter Borse site at Aeschenplatz in 1866 and the newer Marktgasse building from 1906. Both buildings are apparently referred to as the Old Bourse.

Activities in the Basel Stock Exchange building ceased in 1998.
