= Crédit Industriel d'Alsace et de Lorraine =

Former French bank

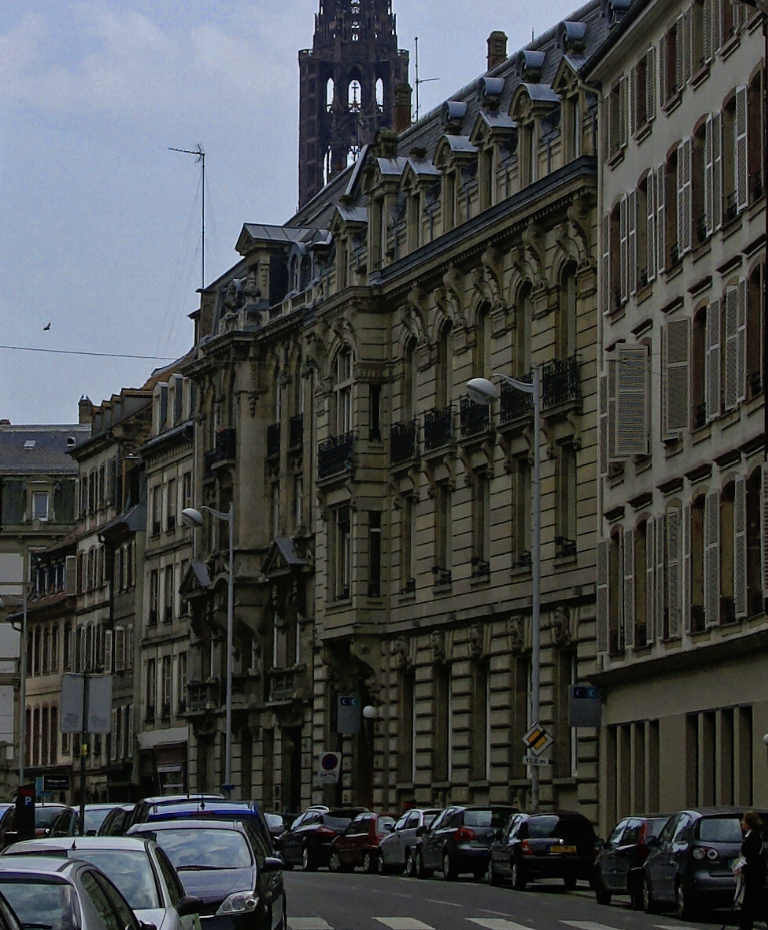
- Building at 14, rue de la Nuée-Bleue in Strasbourg, head office of CIAL from 1931 to 1973, with the spire of Strasbourg Cathedral in the background
- Company type: Private company
- Industry: financial service activities, except insurance and pension funding
- Predecessor: Banque d'Alsace et de Lorraine
- Founded: 1931
- Defunct: 2007
- Fate: Acquired
- Successor: Crédit Industriel et Commercial (CIC)
- Headquarters: Strasbourg, France
- Products: Banking services

The Crédit Industriel d'Alsace et de Lorraine (CIAL, lit. 'Industrial Credit [Bank] of Alsace and Lorraine') was a bank in France, based in Strasbourg. It resulted from the acquisition in 1931 of the Banque d'Alsace et de Lorraine by the Société Alsacienne de Crédit Industriel et Commercial (SACIC, est. 1919), the local affiliate of Paris-based Crédit Industriel et Commercial (CIC). Upon the merger, the SACIC changed its name to CIAL and expanded dynamically in the later 20th century.

Following its 1998 acquisition by Crédit Mutuel Centre Est Europe, the CIC undertook a streamlining of its regional affiliate banks and phase-out of their brands. As part of that nationwide process, the CIAL was fully absorbed into the CIC network and brand identity in 2007.

== Société Alsacienne de Crédit Industriel et Commercial ==
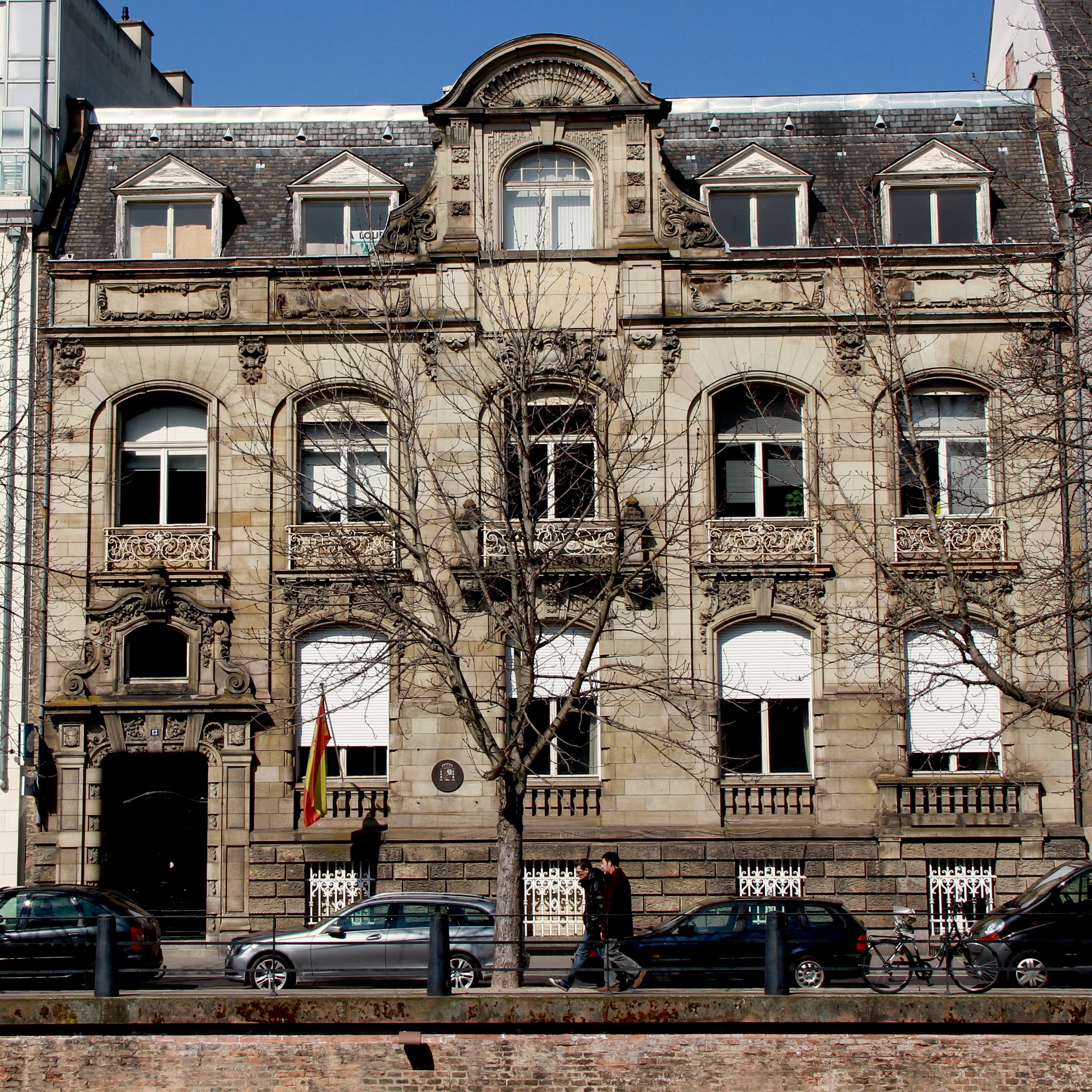
Building at 13, quai Kléber in Strasbourg, designed by architect Adolf Hanser and completed around 1900, the first branch of SACIC in 1920 and its head office from 1922 to the 1931 merger

In the imemdiate aftermath of France's recovery of Alsace, the CIC first unsuccessfully attempted to take over the Banque de Strasbourg, a medium-sized Alsatian credit institution. Instead, it established the SACIC on 22 November 1919, exactly a year after the entry of French forces into Strasbourg, initially as a 94-percent-owned subsidiary registered in Paris at CIC headquarters. It opened its first branch at 13, quai Kléber in the former local branch of the Rheinische Creditbank, which had been expropriated upon the French takeover. It then relocated its head office from Paris to that Strasbourg location in March 1922. Meanwhile, the CIC's stake was reduced to 30 percent.

The SACIC developed dynamically in its first decade, expanding to Belfort in 1920 by acquisition of the local Banque Haas, Mulhouse and Thann in 1924, and Colmar in 1929.

== Crédit Industriel d'Alsace et de Lorraine ==
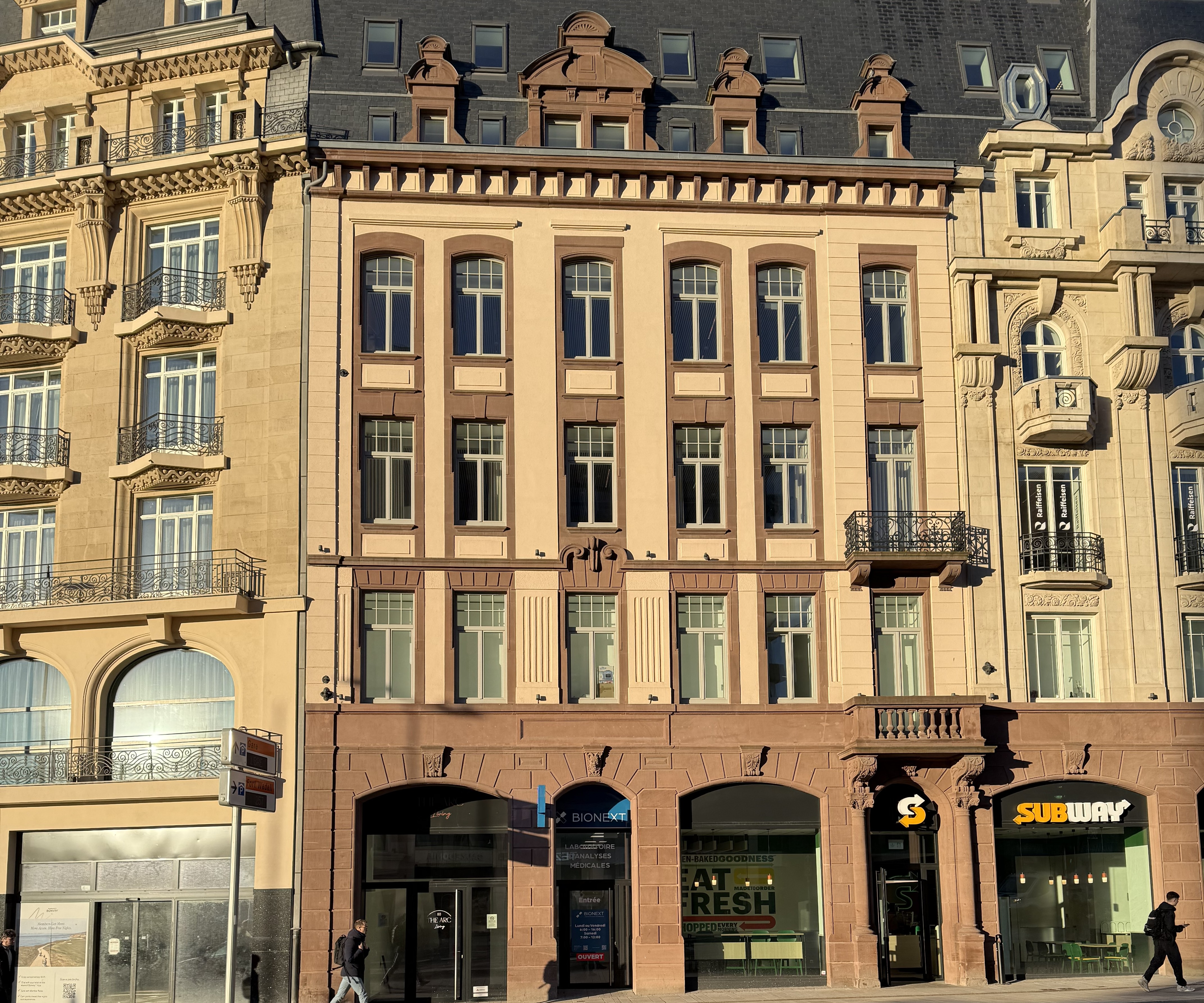
Former head office of Banque Mathieu in Luxembourg

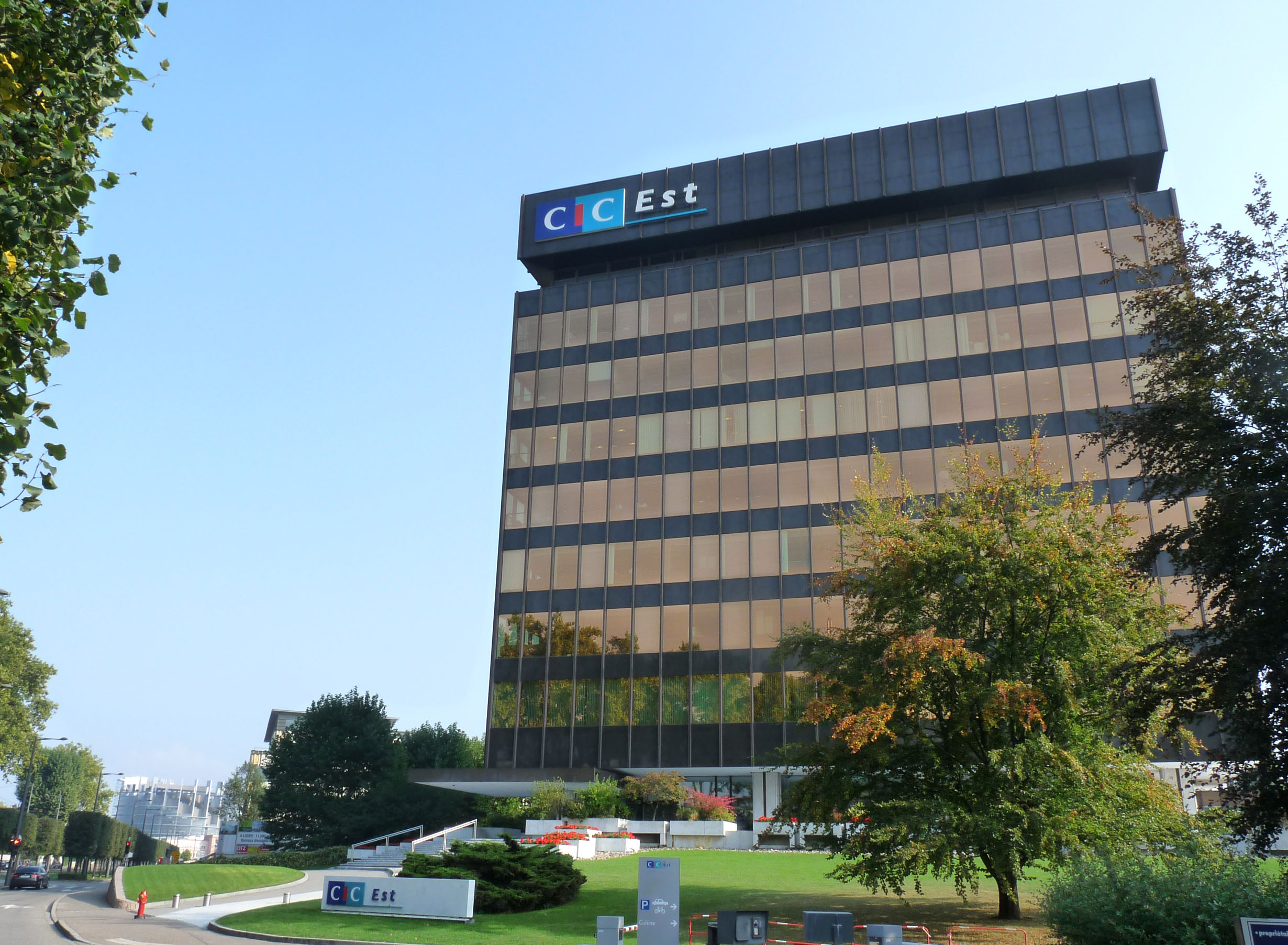
Former CIAL head office in Strasbourg from 1973 to 2007, photographed after 2007 rebranding as CIC Est

The French banking crisis of 1930, which in turn heralded the European banking crisis of 1931, severely affected the Banque d'Alsace et de Lorraine (BAL). In January 1931, the SACIC took over the BAL's operations with support from the French state, including its three foreign branches in Basel, Luxembourg, and Saarbrücken, and renamed itself into Crédit Industriel d'Alsace et de Lorraine, or CIAL, with head office in the BAL's former seat at 14, rue de la Nuée-Bleue in Strasbourg. By this transaction, the bank's headcount rose from around 200 for SACIC alone to around 1,000 in the merged CIAL, in which the French government became a minority shareholder in exchange for its financial assistance.

In early 1935, the CIAL sold its Saarbrücken branch to Dresdner Bank just before the Saar status referendum. In 1939, CIAL Luxembourg was also a founding member of the Association des Banques et Banquiers Luxembourg (ABBL).

During World War II, CIAL's operations in annexed Alsace–Lorraine and Luxembourg came under the control of the respective German occupation authorities, even as the bank had largely relocated its funds and staff to the zone libre and re-registered its head office in Lyon in 1940. In Alsace-Lorraine, a Bankenkommissar, appointed by the Reich authorities with authority over the region's entire banking system, transferred the sequestrated CIAL operations to Deutsche Bank. CIAL Luxembourg was integrated into the Banque Générale du Luxembourg, the former local affiliate of the Société Générale de Belgique which was also forcibly transferred to Deutsche Bank.

The rump Lyon-headquartered CIAL kept operating its branches in Belfort, Besançon and Basel. Jean Wenger-Valentin, scion of an Alsatian banking family who had been the SACIC's first employee in 1920, took over as chairman and chief executive in late 1940. He immediately took the precautionary initiative of opening a joint CIAL-CIC branch in Algiers, where he personally relocated and was therefore cut off from the mainland from November 1942 following Operation Torch. In the wake of the liberation of France and Luxembourg in 1944-1945, the CIAL recovered all its former operations and transferred its head office back to Strasbourg in June 1945. In Luxembourg, it was temporarily hosted by the Caisse de pension des employés privés and could eventually recover its former location at 6 Groussgaass in 1946.

In the postwar period, the CIAL developed dynamically and largely independently from the CIC, surpassing its perennial rival the Société Générale Alsacienne de Banque in 1946 and expanding its network to 134 locations by 1959. In 1947 it again established an affiliate in Saarbrücken, the Saarländische Kreditbank (French: Crédit Sarrois) of which it sold a majority stake to Deutsche Bank in 1956. Also in 1956, CIAL Luxembourg moved to a new building it had commissioned at No. 103 Groussgaass, on the corner of rue Aldringen, demolished in the 21st century for the redevelopment of Place Émile-Hamilius. In 1961, the CIAL acquired a minority stake in Brussels-based Société Belge de Banque, then in 1969 a 30 percent stake in Luxembourg-based Banque Mathieu Frères (est. 1937, at 78 avenue de la Liberté), raised to 100 percent in 1971. By 1970, CIAL employed over two thousands and was the twelfth-largest French bank by total deposits.

Head office of the Banque du Luxembourg, designed by Arquitectonica and inaugurated in 1994

In 1973, CIAL moved its head office from its historic site at rue de la Nuée-Bleue to a new building at 31, rue du Wacken in the Wacken neighborhood of Strasbourg, designed by Atelier UA5. The street was renamed rue Jean Wenger-Valentin in 1981, honoring the man who had brought the CIAL to prominence and had stayed at its helm until 1970. In May 1977, the CIAL reorganized the Banque Mathieu Frères in Luxembourg and subsequently renamed it the Banque de Luxembourg, in which Deutsche Bank and its affiliated Saarländische Kreditbank (which became Deutsche Bank Saar AG the next year) took minority stakes.

By end-1981, the CIAL had nearly 2,700 employees, total assets of 17 billion French francs, and a network of 160 branches in France and 5 abroad. It was nationalized in 1982 together with the rest of the French banking sector. In the subsequent reorganization, the CIAL's Swiss network, which had expanded to Lausanne in 1971 and Zurich in 1977, was taken over by the CIC, but the CIAL kept its stakes in the Banque de Luxembourg (72 percent) and in Deutsche Bank Saar (24 percent). In 1987, the CIAL recovered its former Swiss subsidiary from the CIC and further acquired Soginvest Banca in Lugano. In 1988, it formed a strategic partnership with Stuttgart-based Baden-Württembergische Bank. By the late 1980s, it had become the largest of the regional banks in the CIC network. In 1995, it contributed 44 percent of the total profits of the CIC Group.

In 1991, the Banque de Luxembourg took over the CIAL's own branch in Luxembourg, which had remained separate until then, and became the Grand-Duchy's fifth-largest bank by total assets. In the later 1990s, the CIAL sold its minority stake in Deutsche Bank Saar but expanded in Switzerland, where it acquired the former subsidiary of Banque de l'Union Européenne from CIC and became the largest French-owned bank in the country with 280 employees. By 1997, 42 percent of the CIAL's profits came from Luxembourg, 42 percent from France, and 26 percent from Switzerland.

== Absorption into CIC ==
In 1998, the CIC was privatized and purchased by the CIAL's Strasbourg-based rival (and Wacken neighbor) the Crédit Mutuel Centre Est Europe, which undertook a rationalization of the CIC's network of semi-autonomous banks. In 2002, the Crédit Mutuel-owned CIC purchased Deutsche Bank's 29 percent stake in the Banque de Luxembourg and became its sole owner. In 2007, the CIC merged the CIAL with its other subsidiary based in Nancy, the Société Nancéienne Varin-Bernier (SNVB), to create a new regional entity named Banque CIC Est.

== See also ==
- List of banks in France
