= Crédit Industriel et Commercial =

French financial services group

CIC (Crédit Industriel et Commercial)

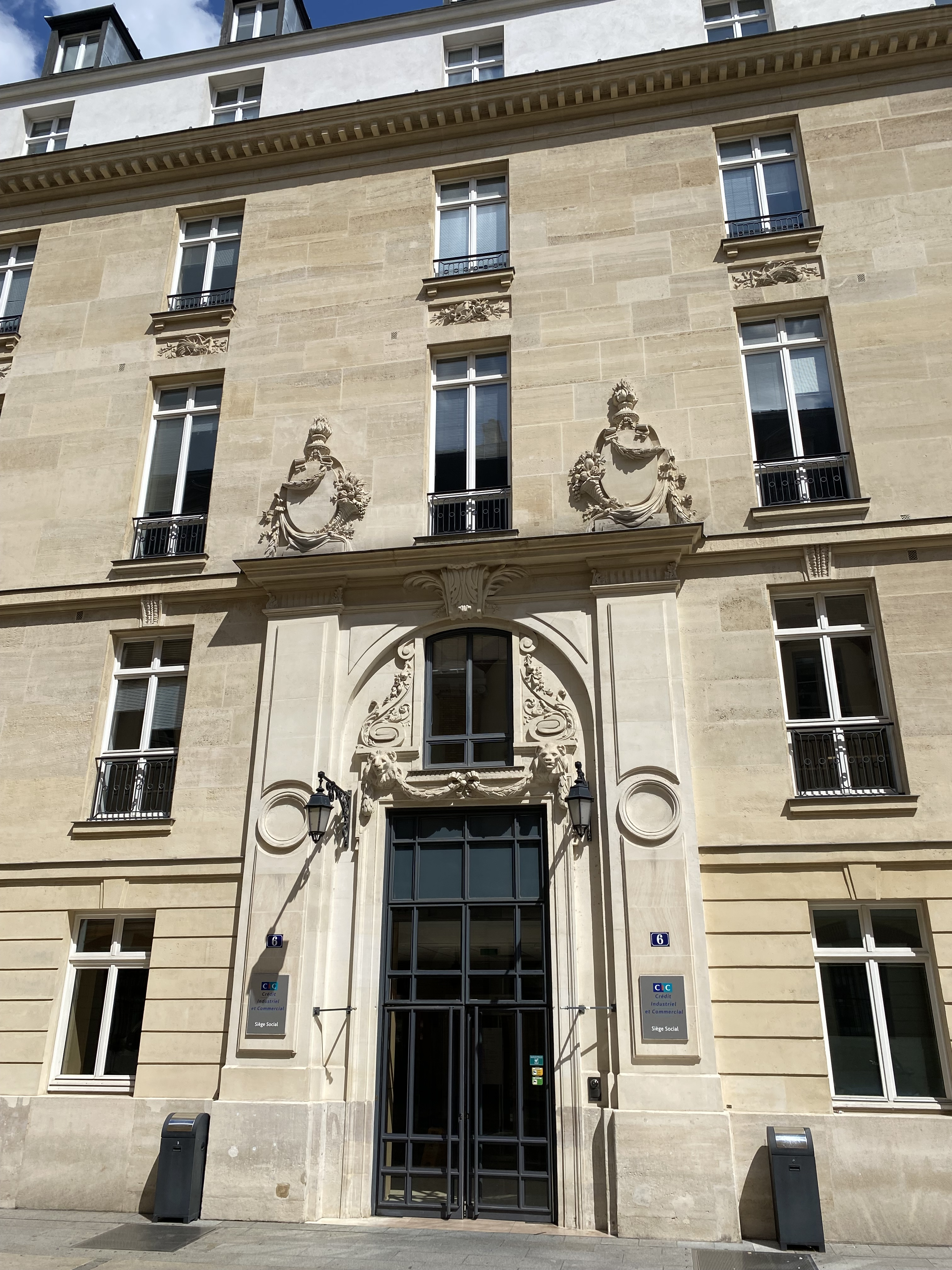
- Head office of the CIC at 6, avenue de Provence in Paris
- Industry: Financial services
- Founded: 7 May 1859
- Headquarters: Paris
- Products: Banking and insurance
- Total assets: $297.3 billion (2015)
- Number of employees: 33,300
- Parent: Banque Fédérative du Crédit Mutuel
- Website: cic.fr

The Crédit Industriel et Commercial (French pronunciation: [kʁedi ɛ̃dystʁijɛl e kɔmɛʁsjal], "Industrial and Commercial Credit Company", abbr. CIC) is a bank and financial services group in France, founded in 1859. It's fully owned by Crédit Mutuel since 2007, one of the country's top five banking groups, after partial ownership since 1998.

== History ==
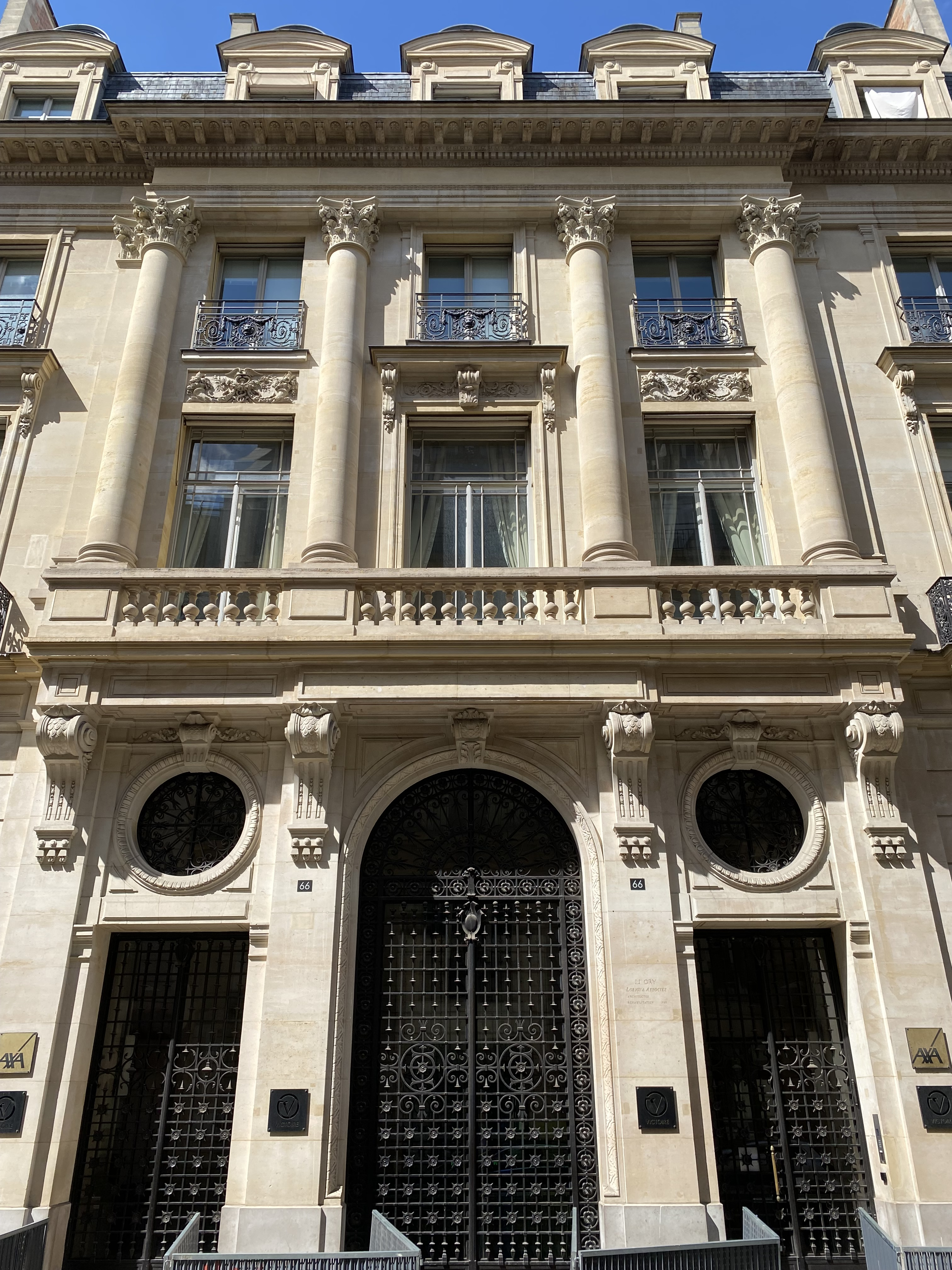
Building at 66, rue de la Victoire in Paris, headquarters of CIC from 1889 to 1993

=== Creation and independent development ===
The Société générale de crédit industriel et commercial was founded on 7 May 1859, mainly on the initiative of banker Armand Donon who was supported by the politically influential Duke of Morny, as a competitor to the Pereire brothers's Crédit Mobilier on the model of successful British depository banks such as the London and Westminster Bank. The new bank was initially located in a hotel at 57, rue Taitbout, and in January 1860 purchased a mansion at 66, rue de la Chaussée d'Antin, in whose garden it erected a commercial building (no longer extant) that was completed in November 1861. That facility was accessible from No. 72, rue de la Victoire, and the CIC would remain known as the "bank of the rue de la Victoire" even that street has no longer been its registered address since 1993.

The CIC soon opened a number of other branches in Paris, and in the 1860s actively developed its international lending, not least in the newly formed Kingdom of Italy where it sponsored one of the early joint-stock banks, the Banca di Credito Italiano. In France outside Paris, unlike the Crédit Lyonnais (est. 1863) and Société Générale (est. 1864) which created networks of their own provincial branches, the CIC sponsored a number of affiliated but autonomous regional banks. In the early years, these included the Société Marseillaise de Crédit (SMC) in Marseille (est. 1865); the Société lyonnaise de dépôts, de comptes courants et de crédit industriel in Lyon (est. 1865); and the Société de crédit industriel et de dépôts du Nord (1866), a build-up of the Comptoir d'escompte de Lille created in 1848, which in 1871 would become the Crédit du Nord. These initial achievements were fragile, however, not least because the CIC held no equity shares in the allied banks. The Crédit du Nord escaped the CIC’s influence as early as the 1870s, and so did the SMC in the early 20th century.

In the late 1860s, the CIC lent to the Suez Canal Company and to the Pereire brothers' Compagnie Générale Transatlantique. Donon stopped attending board meetings in August 1866 and formally left the board in 1871, as he was committed to the development of another bank, the Société des Dépôts et Comptes Courants, which would eventually be absorbed by the Comptoir national d'escompte de Paris in 1892. After the Franco-Prussian War of 1870-1871, the CIC was increasingly associated with conservative and reactionary political factions. It was instrumental in the creation in 1875 of the Banque de l'Indochine, in partnership with the Comptoir d'escompte de Paris. In 1881, it founded the National Bank of Haiti, which took the role of Haiti's central bank by concession from that country's government while remaining headquartered in Paris. It also participated in the creation of the Banque hypothécaire de France (1879), Banco Nacional Mexicano (1881), and Banco General de Madrid (1881).

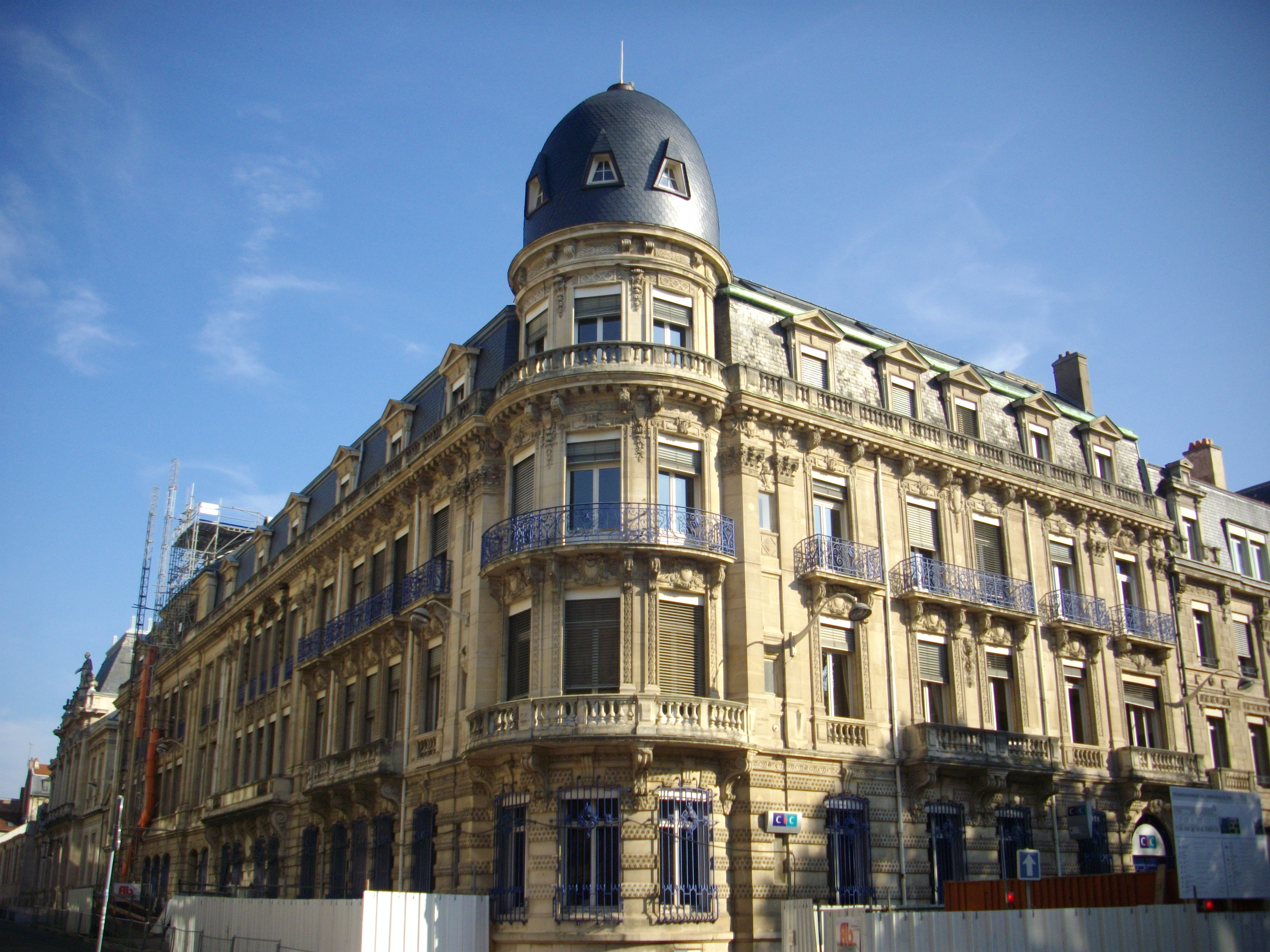
Hotel Lang on 4, place Maginot in Nancy, head office of Société nancéienne from 1909

In Paris, in its first few decades the CIC's network of branches lagged well behind those of its two main rivals, Crédit Lyonnais and Société Générale. Outside the capital, the CIC kept its strategy of fostering the creation or build-up of regional banks. It thus sponsored the Société stéphanoise de dépôts, de comptes courants et de crédit industriel in Saint-Étienne (est. 1879); the Société bordelaise de crédit industriel et dépôts in Bordeaux (est. 1880); and the Société nancéienne de crédit industriel et dépôts in Nancy (est. 1881). The bank in Saint-Étienne, however, failed and was liquidated in 1883.

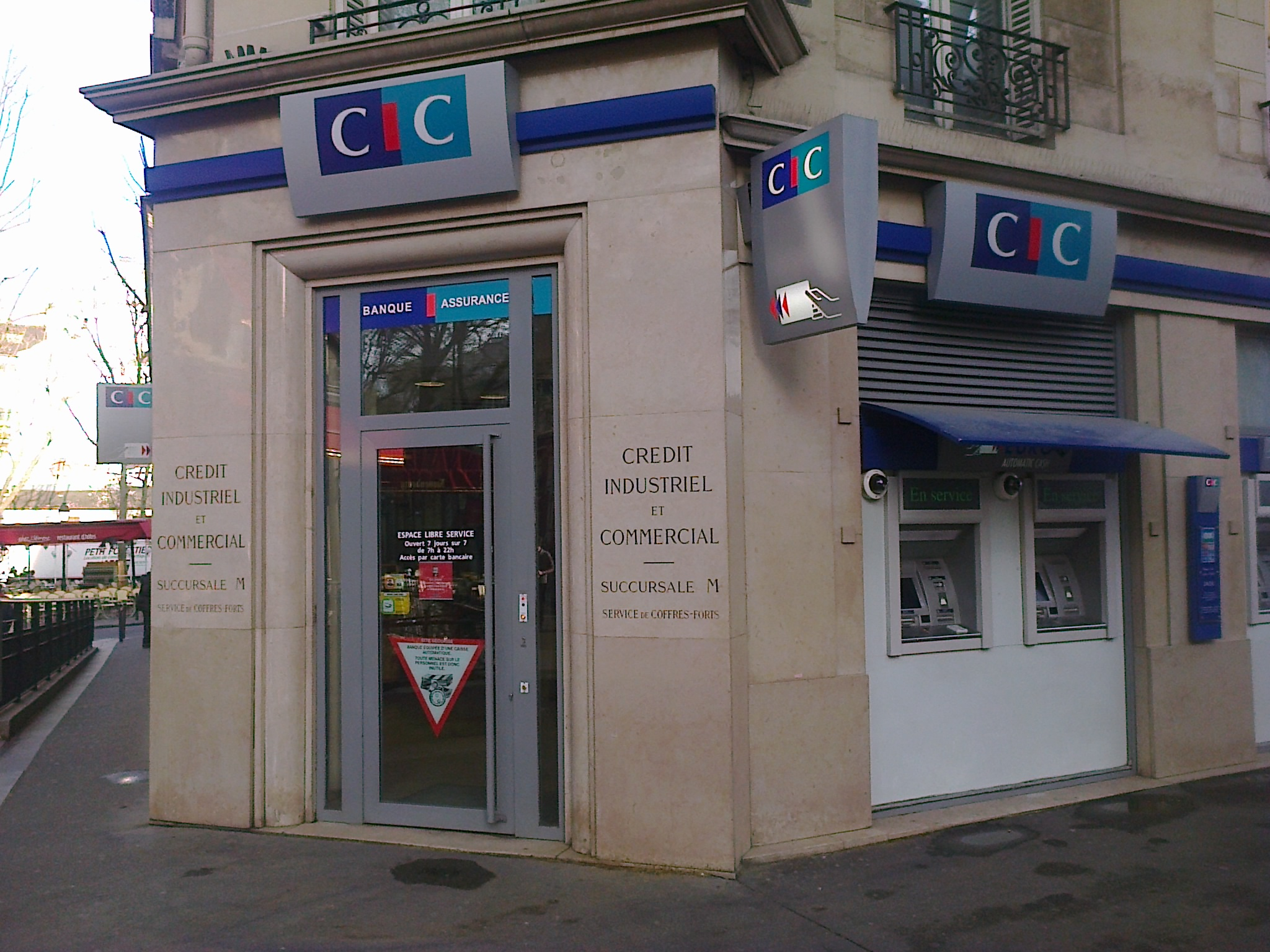
Saint-Michel branch in Paris, opened in 1891

In November 1889, the bank's head office was relocated to a new building on 66, rue de la Victoire, where it would remain for over a century. In August 1895, the CIC also opened a branch in London, at 126, Cannon Street. In 1903, it sponsored the creation of the Société belge de crédit industriel et commercial et de dépôts in Brussels. In the 1890s and 1900s, it greatly expanded its branch network in the capital region, which in 1913 reached 42 inside Paris and 6 in the surroundings.

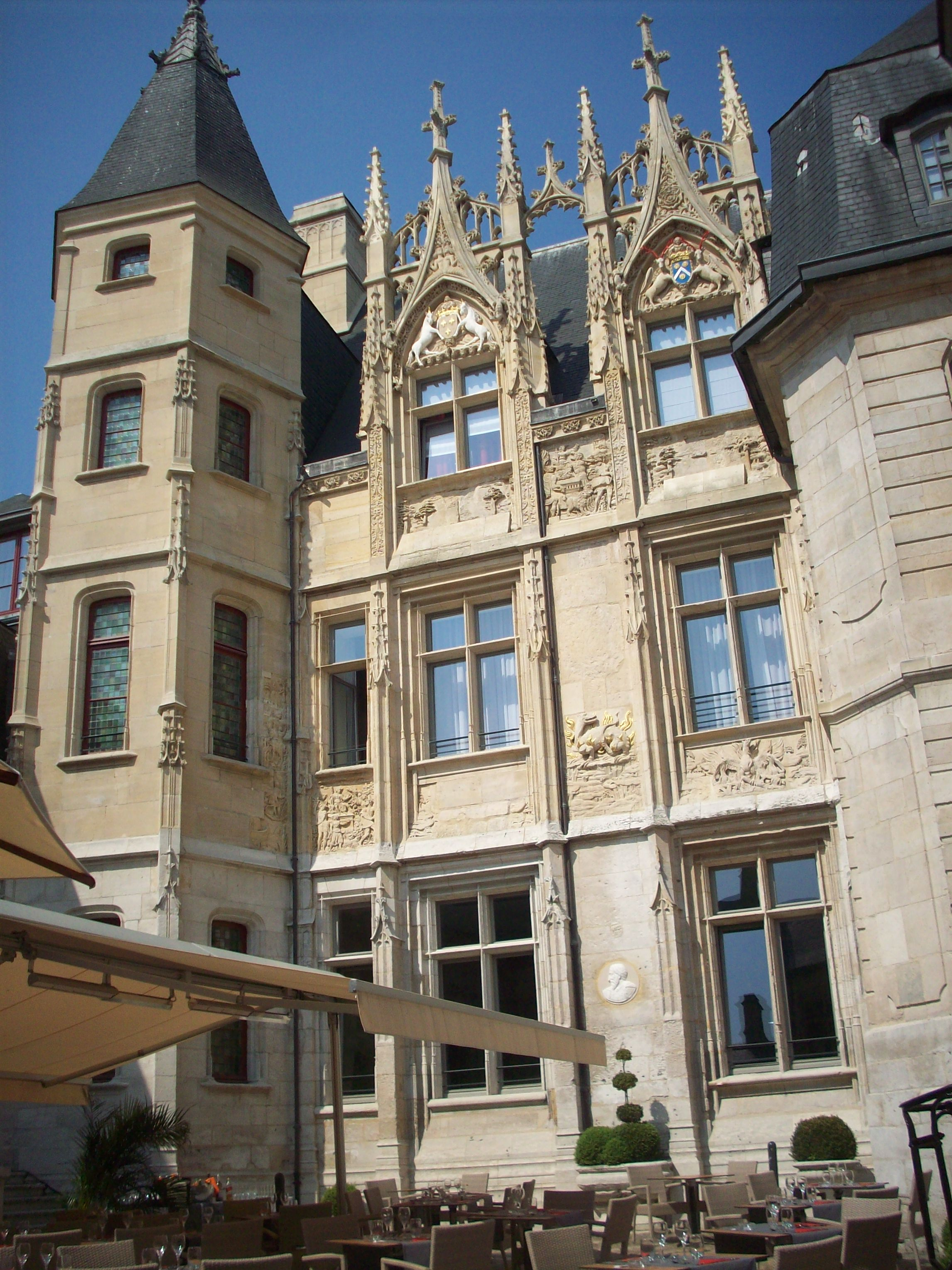
Hôtel de Bourgtheroulde in Rouen, seat of the Crédit Industriel de Normandie until 2007

At the start of World War I, the head office was temporarily relocated to Bordeaux, but returned to the capital in November 1914. Both shortly before and after the war, the CIC further strengthened its network outside of Paris by acquiring a 60% majority stake in the Société bordelaise in October 1913, a 11% stake in the Société nancéienne in May 1914, and a 22% stake in the Société lyonnaise in April 1921. In 1919, the CIC also acquired a 29.5% stake in the Société normande de banque et de dépôts in Caen (est. 1913), and in November 1919 created a majority-owned subsidiary, the Société alsacienne de crédit industriel et commercial, whose head office was relocated to Strasbourg in March 1922. Also in November 1919, it took a 25% stake in the Banque Dupont in Valenciennes (est. 1819), and in 1920 a 33% stake in the Banque Scalbert in Lille (est. 1838). The CIC further developed this strategy of stake-building when financial stress hit several regional banks in subsequent years. It took a 33% stake in Crédit nantais in June 1924, a 20% stake in Crédit de l'Ouest (est. 1913) in December 1924, a 28% stake in Crédit havrais in September 1926, a 33% stake in Banque régionale de l'Ouest (BRO, est. 1913) in 1927, and a stake in Comptoir d'escompte de Rouen in 1930. In 1929, the CIC created a central body for its regional banks, the Union de banques régionales pour le crédit industriel. By then, it was the fifth-largest French bank by assets, behind the Crédit Lyonnais, Société Générale, Comptoir national d'escompte de Paris, and Banque Nationale de Crédit. The CIC's participation in bank restructurings in the early 1930s strengthened the Société alsacienne, which renamed itself Crédit Industriel d'Alsace et de Lorraine (CIAL) in May 1931, and the Société lyonnaise. In June 1931 the CIC also created the Société toulousaine de crédit industriel et commercial, of which it owned 80% of equity, but sold it in 1937 to the Société Bordelaise. In March 1932, the CIC engineered the merger of its Société normande, Crédit havrais and Comptoir de l'Ouest to form the Crédit Industriel de Normandie (CIN), which also absorbed the Comptoir d'escompte de Rouen in March 1935. In August 1936, the CIC sold most of its majority stake in the Société belge.

In April–May 1941, the CIC took advantage of the Vichy anti-Jewish legislation to acquire control of Banque Transatlantique together with two subsidiaries, Banque de Tunisie and Banque Commerciale du Maroc (the latter merged into Attijariwafa Bank in the early 2000s). After the Liberation of France, its larger rivals were nationalized, and as a consequence the CIC became France's largest private-sector bank in the postwar period. In 1957, it merged the Crédit de l'Ouest and Crédit nantais to form the Crédit Industriel de l'Ouest (CIO). In June 1967, it ceded its branches in Algiers and Oran to the Bank of Algeria. The group's first logo was adopted in 1967.

=== Takeover by Suez and nationalization ===
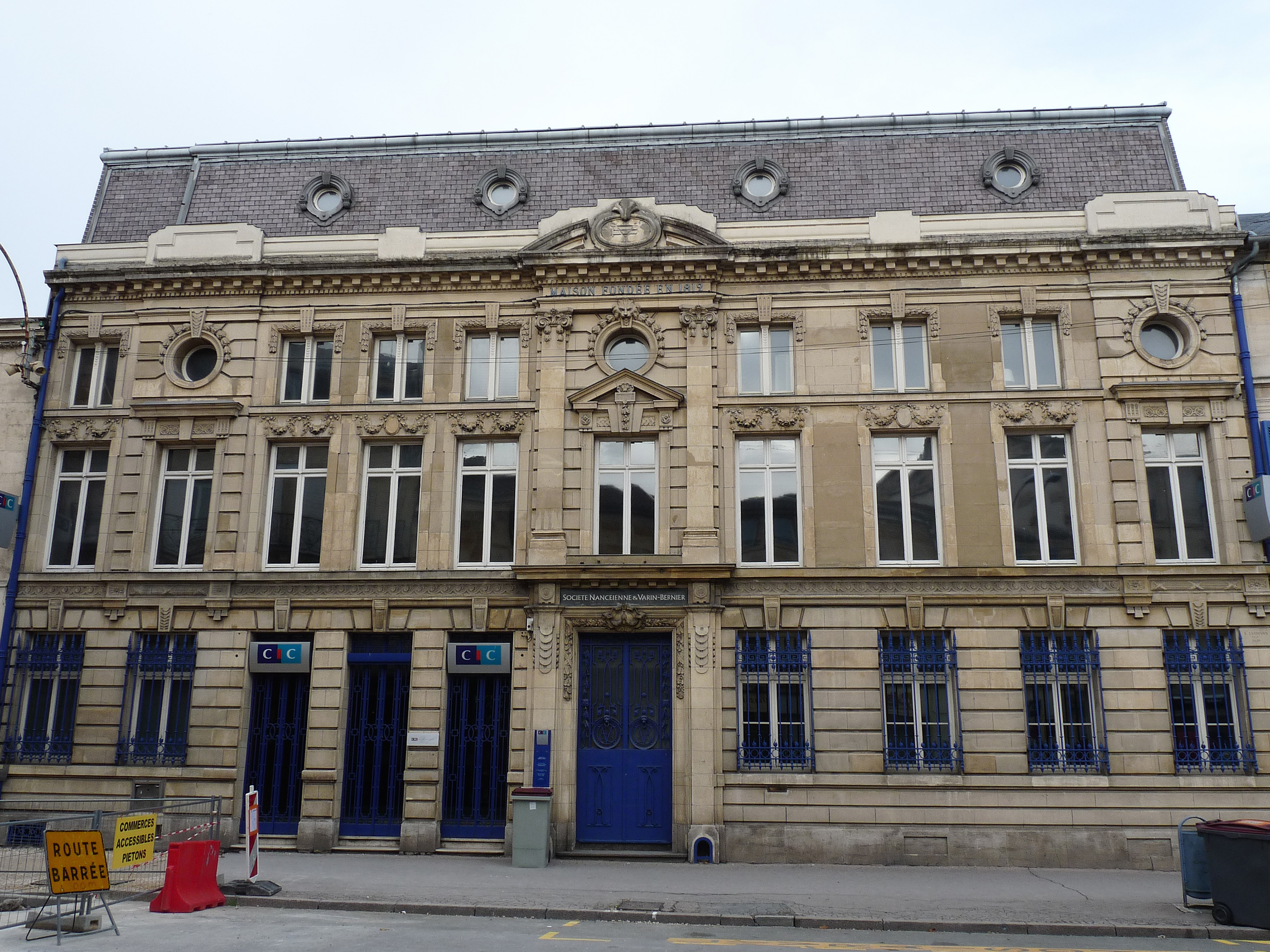
Former head office of Banque Varin-Bernier & Cie in Bar-le-Duc, a private bank founded in 1812 that merged with Société nancéienne in 1972 to form Société Nancéienne Varin-Bernier (SNVB)

From 1965 to 1971, the CIC was at the center of a major takeover battle. In reaction to the Suez Company's purchase of a 20% equity stake in the Banque de l'Union parisienne (BUP) in February 1965, CIC chairman Edmond Lebée reached out to Suez's rival the Banque de Paris et des Pays-Bas (also known as Paribas) to explore a possible merger, whose project leaked in the press on 5 June 1966. In the summer of 1968, the situation escalated into a takeover battle on the Paris stock exchange, following which neither Paribas nor Suez succeeded in acquiring a majority of the CIC's shares. Eventually, on 10 September 1971, the two bidders reached an agreement under which Suez would take control of the CIC, while ceding the BUP to Paribas. Suez, however, kept a hands-off approach and did not include the CIC in the 1975 merger that created Banque Indosuez.

Meanwhile, like many other European banks, from the late 1960s the CIC accelerated its international development. It opened an office in Frankfurt in 1969, followed by others in Latin America, Beirut, Tokyo, Hong Kong, Sydney, and Milan. In 1974, it opened a branch in New York, its second only after the one in London. By 1977, it had 21 representative offices abroad. In 1979, the CIC acquired a 25% stake in the Banque Nagelmackers in Belgium. Its network of regional banks was further strengthened by the respective mergers, of Société nancéienne and Banque Varin-Bernier to form Société Nancéienne Varin-Bernier (SNVB) in 1972, and of Banque Scalbert and Banque Dupont in Northern France to form Banque Scalbert-Dupont (BSD) in 1977.

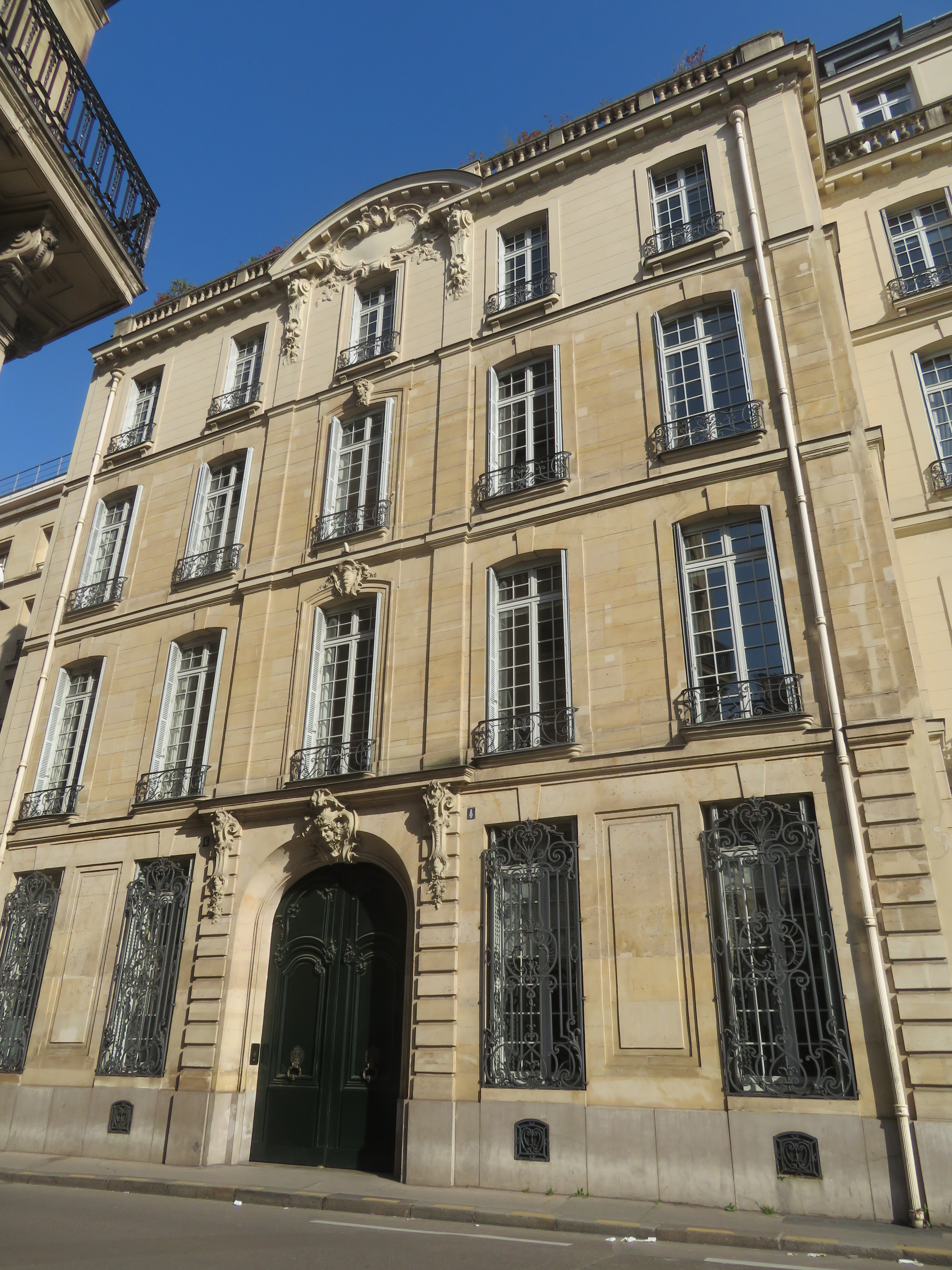
Former seat of the Banque des Pays du Nord (est. 1911), absorbed by the UEIF in 1943 and subsequently by the CIC in 1982, at 4, rue Gaillon in Paris; seat of the Union européenne de CIC from 1990 to 1999

In 1982, the CIC was nationalized under François Mitterrand's Socialist presidency, together with most of the affiliated regional banks and with its parent, the Suez Company. This triggered significant restructuring. In July 1983, the CIC acquired the Banque de l'Union Européenne (BUE), an investment bank. The BUE had been born in 1968 from a restructuring of the Union Européenne Industrielle et Financière (UEIF), created in 1920 by Eugène Schneider II together with the Banque de l'Union Parisienne and the Empain group in relation with their business interests in the Little Entente countries, especially Czechoslovakia. The CIC then created a subsidiary, CIC-Paris, which took over the Parisian banking activity as well as Banque Transatlantique and the stakes in foreign banks. Both the BUE and CIC-Paris became fully owned subsidiaries of a parent holding company, the Compagnie financière de CIC, which also held the stakes in the regional banks outside Paris. Then, in 1985 the government encouraged the insurer Groupe des Assurances Nationales (GAN) to build up a stake in CIC, which reached 34% in January 1986. Meanwhile, CIC was recapitalized by the state in 1983 and in 1985. In 1987, full ownership of the regional banks (except the Crédit fécampois which had been too small for nationalization in 1982) was transferred to the Compagnie financière de CIC, which in June 1988 left the historic head office on rue de la Victoire for a new headquarters at 52, rue de Monceau. In 1989, the GAN raised its stake to 56%, then 82% in 1991 and 92.6% in 1995, an unusual case of a major banking group owned by an insurance company. In 1990, the BUE incurred major financial difficulties and was merged into the Compagnie financière which thus took the new name Union Européenne de CIC (UE-CIC) and relocated once more, to the BUE's former Parisian headquarters at 4, rue Gaillon. In 1993, the CIC-Paris moved across street from its longstanding head office at 66, rue de la Victoire, which it had sold in late 1989, to a renovated complex of buildings between the rue de la Victoire, rue Taitbout, and rue de Provence, known as the "VTP building" for the three streets' initials, including the former head office of Société Générale at 76, rue de la Victoire.

=== Privatization and integration into the Crédit Mutuel Group ===
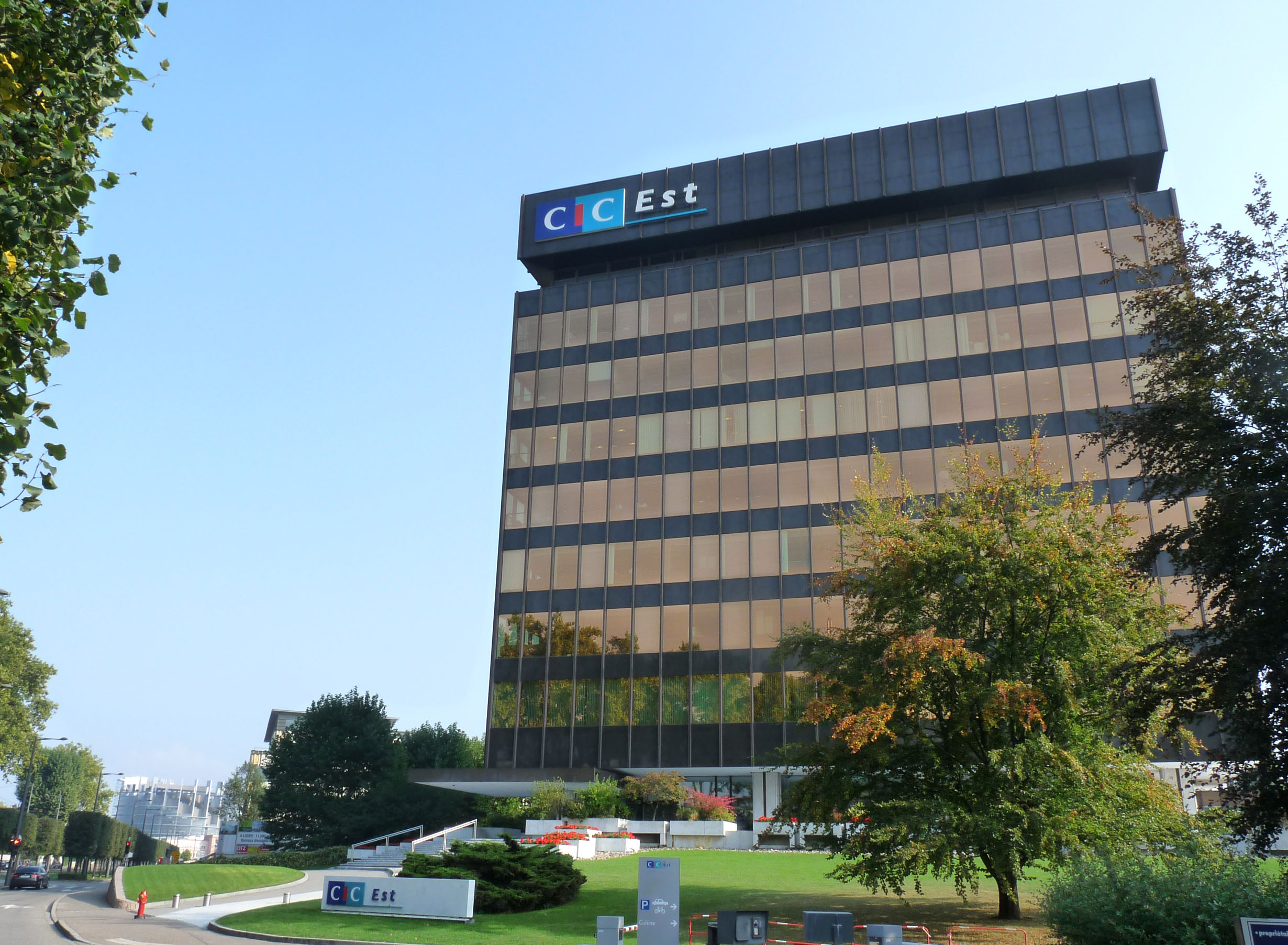
Head office of Banque CIC Est, in the Wacken neighborhood of Strasbourg

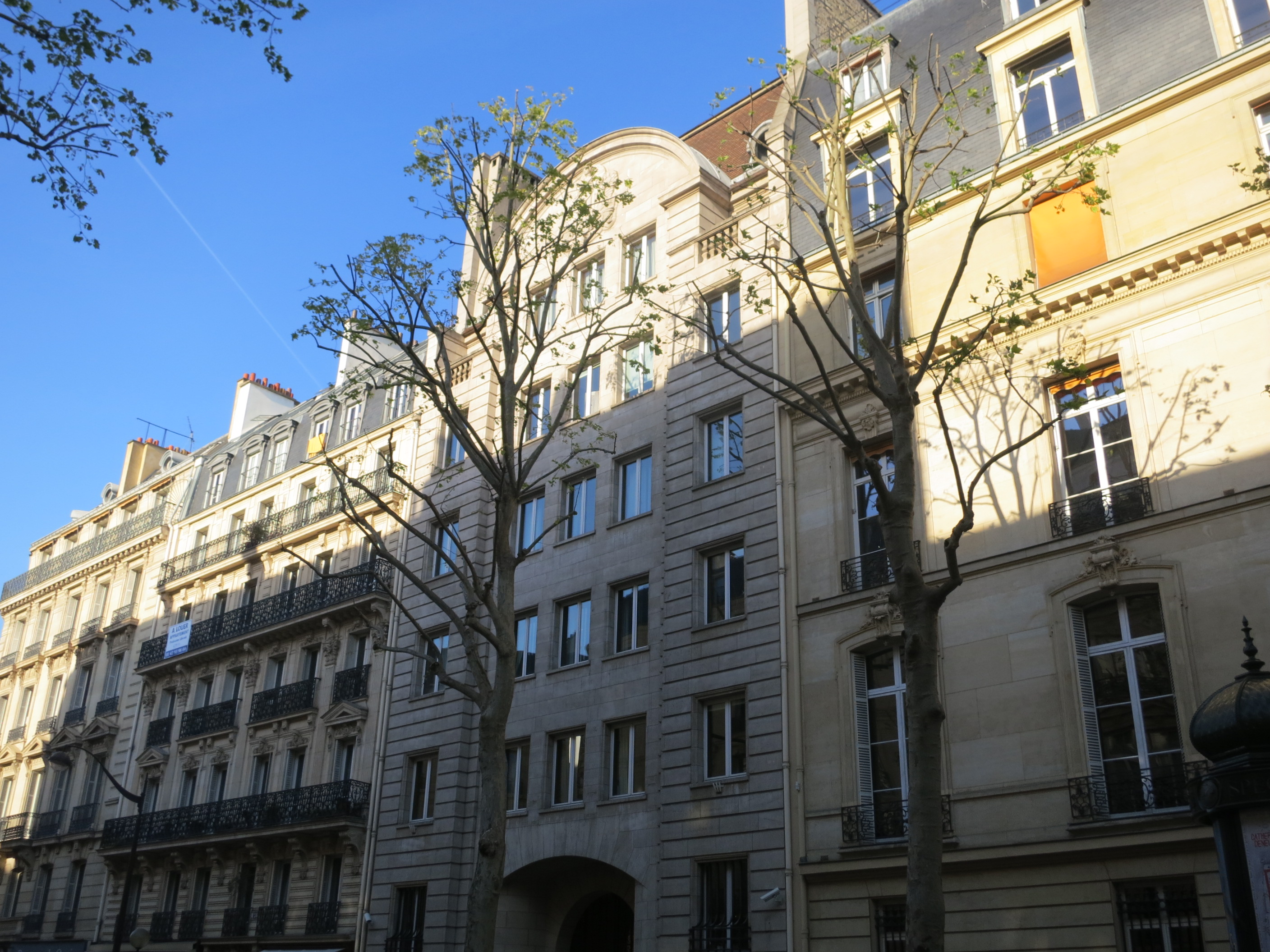
Former Paris office of Banque Dupont, since 2000 the seat of Banque Transatlantique

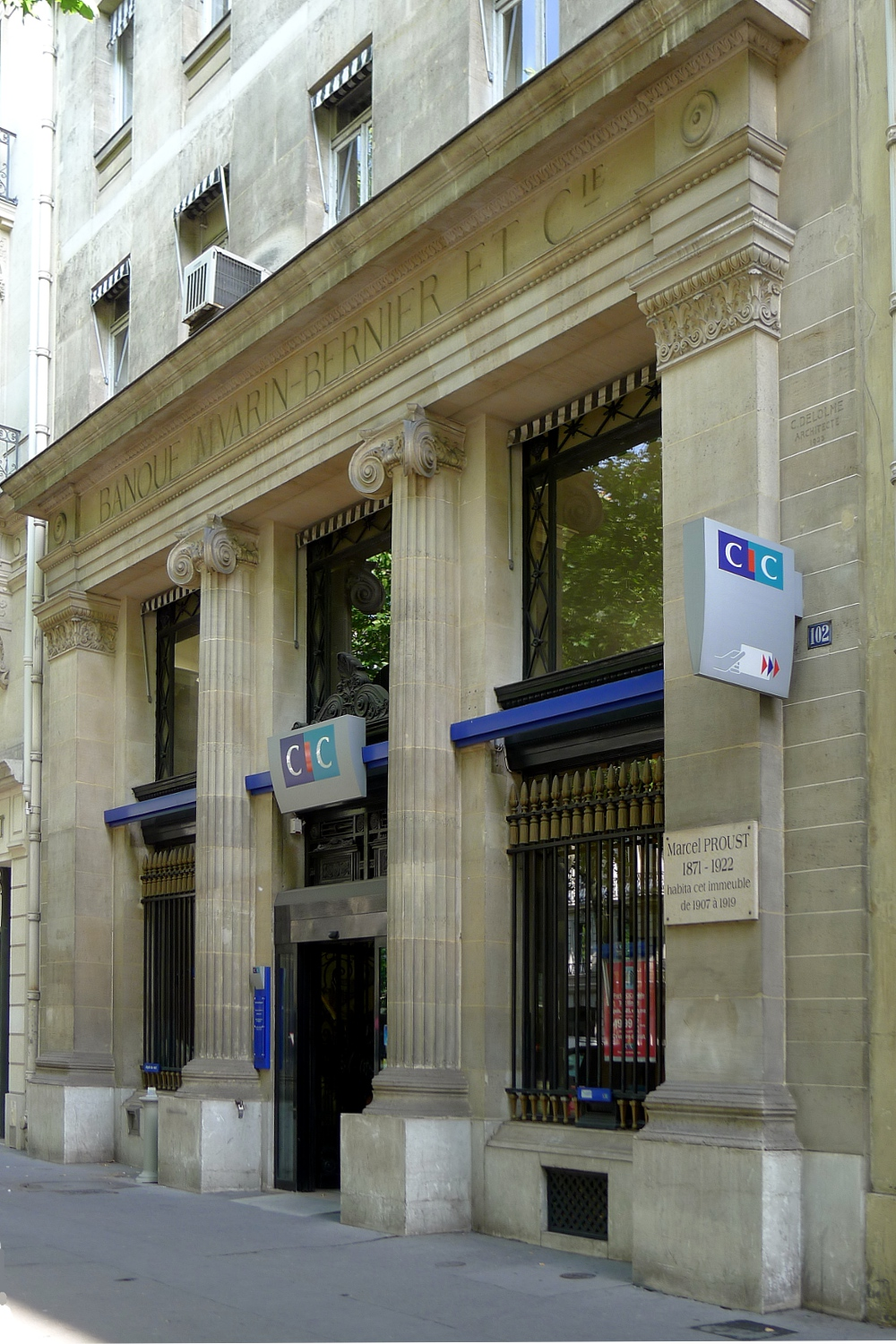
Former Paris office of Banque Varin-Bernier on 102, boulevard Haussmann in Paris, converted into a local CIC branch

Following the election of a center-right government in 1993, the political pendulum shifted back towards privatization of the CIC and its parent the GAN insurance company, but this was made difficult by both entities' financial difficulties through the downturn of the early 1990s. A first attempt in August 1996, to sell a 67% stake in the CIC holding company, foundered in mid-November, triggering the resignations of the chairmen of both UE-CIC and GAN, in a context of internal opposition to the sale process from both the CIC staff and the more profitable regional banks, including CIAL, BSD, SNVB and CIO.

In 1998, a second attempt under a new center-left government was more successful and the competitive tender was won in mid-April, somewhat unexpectedly, by the Banque Fédérative du Crédit Mutuel, a Strasbourg-based entity of the Crédit Mutuel Group, led by Michel Lucas, with a bid for a 67% stake that valued the whole of UE-CIC at 20 billion French francs.

The new management from Crédit Mutuel further central control over the group's regional banks, and in 1999 the UE-CIC and CIC-Paris merged back into a single entity called CIC. In September 2001, Crédit Mutuel completed its takeover of CIC by acquiring the GAN's residual 23% stake, and CIC was eventually delisted in August 2017. In July 2001, CIC had acquired full ownership of the Banque Transatlantique through a delisting, and in 2002 acquired full ownership of Banque de Luxembourg, in which CIAL had been a major shareholder since 1969, by purchasing Deutsche Bank's 29% stake.

In the 2000s the CIC further streamlined its regional network and phased out its historic brands. In 2006, CIO and BRO merged to form CIC Banque CIO-BRO, renamed Banque CIC Ouest in 2010; BSD and CIN (plus the small Crédit fécampois) merged to form CIC Banque BSD-CIN, renamed Banque CIC Nord Ouest in 2010; and CIAL and SNVB merged in 2007 to form Banque CIC Est. The Société bordelaise also changed its name to Banque CIC Sud Ouest; and the Société lyonnaise, which had been renamed the Lyonnaise de Banque in 1988, became Banque CIC Sud-Est. CIC developed international partnerships, in Italy with Banca Popolare di Milano in 2004, in Tunisia through an increase to 20% of its stake in Banque de Tunisie in 2002, and in Morocco by taking a 10% stake in BMCE Bank, which was later increased. In 2015, CIC sold the Geneva-based Banque Pasche, acquired in stages by the Société lyonnaise between 1962 and 1996, to Luxembourg's Banque Havilland. In 2022, CIC encountered international controversy when a New York Times article highlighted its siphoning of millions of Francs in fees and interest from Haiti’s treasury in the late 19th and early 20th centuries.

== Leadership ==
For most of its history since 1890, the CIC has had separate individuals holding the respective roles of chair (French: président) and chief executive (French: directeur or French: directeur-général). On several occasion, the chief executive later became chair. The two offices have been merged in 1978-1982 and again since 2011.

=== Chairs ===
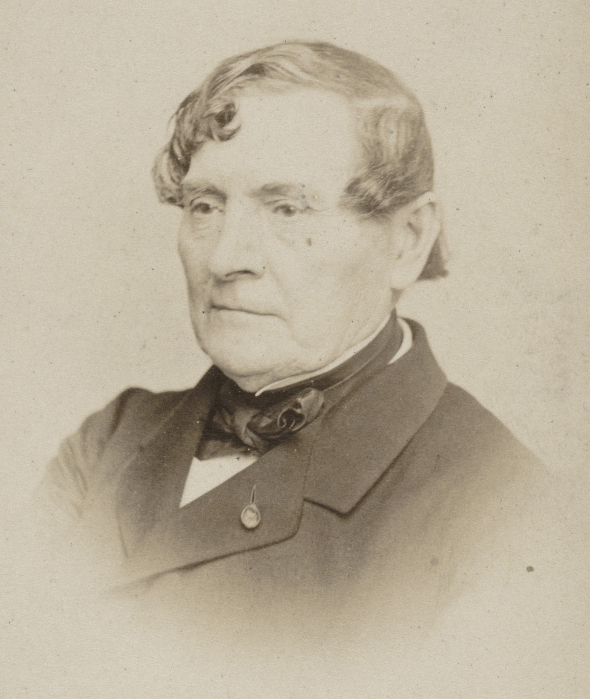
Gaston d'Audiffret, first chairman of CIC

- Gaston d'Audiffret (1859-1878)
- Henri Durrieu (1878-1886)
- Joseph Gay (1886-1894)
- Albert Guillemin de Monplanet (1894-1927)
- Charles Georges-Picot (1927-1930)
- Henri Thélier (1930-1936)
- Joseph Deschamp (1936-1952)
- Edmond Lebée (1952-1968)
- Christian Chaix de Lavarène (1968-1978)
- Dominique Chatillon (1978-1982)
- Georges Dumas (1982-1986)
- Jean Dromer (1986-1987)
- Jean Saint-Geours (1987-1989)
- François Cariès (1989-1992)
- Jean-Pierre Aubert (1992-1996)
- Bernard Yoncourt (1996)
- Philippe Pontet (1996-1998)
- Étienne Pflimlin (1998-2010)
- Michel Lucas (2011-2014)
- Nicolas Théry (2014–present)

=== Chief executives ===
- Marcel de Saint-Quentin (1890-1894)
- Paul Desvaux (1894?-1907)
- Charles Georges-Picot (1907-1921)
- Joseph Deschamp (1921-1931)
- Edmond Lebée (1931-1936)
- Charles Roth le Gentil (1936-1940)
- Charles Dangelzer (1936-1960)
- Christian Chaix de Lavarène (1961-1968)
- Jean Roquerbe (1968-1972)
- Jean-Pierre Fourcade (1972-1974)
- Dominique Chatillon (1974-1982)
- Christian Giacomotto (1982-1988)
- Gilles Guitton (1988-1998)
- Michel Lucas (1998-2014)
- Nicolas Théry (2014–present)

== Operations ==
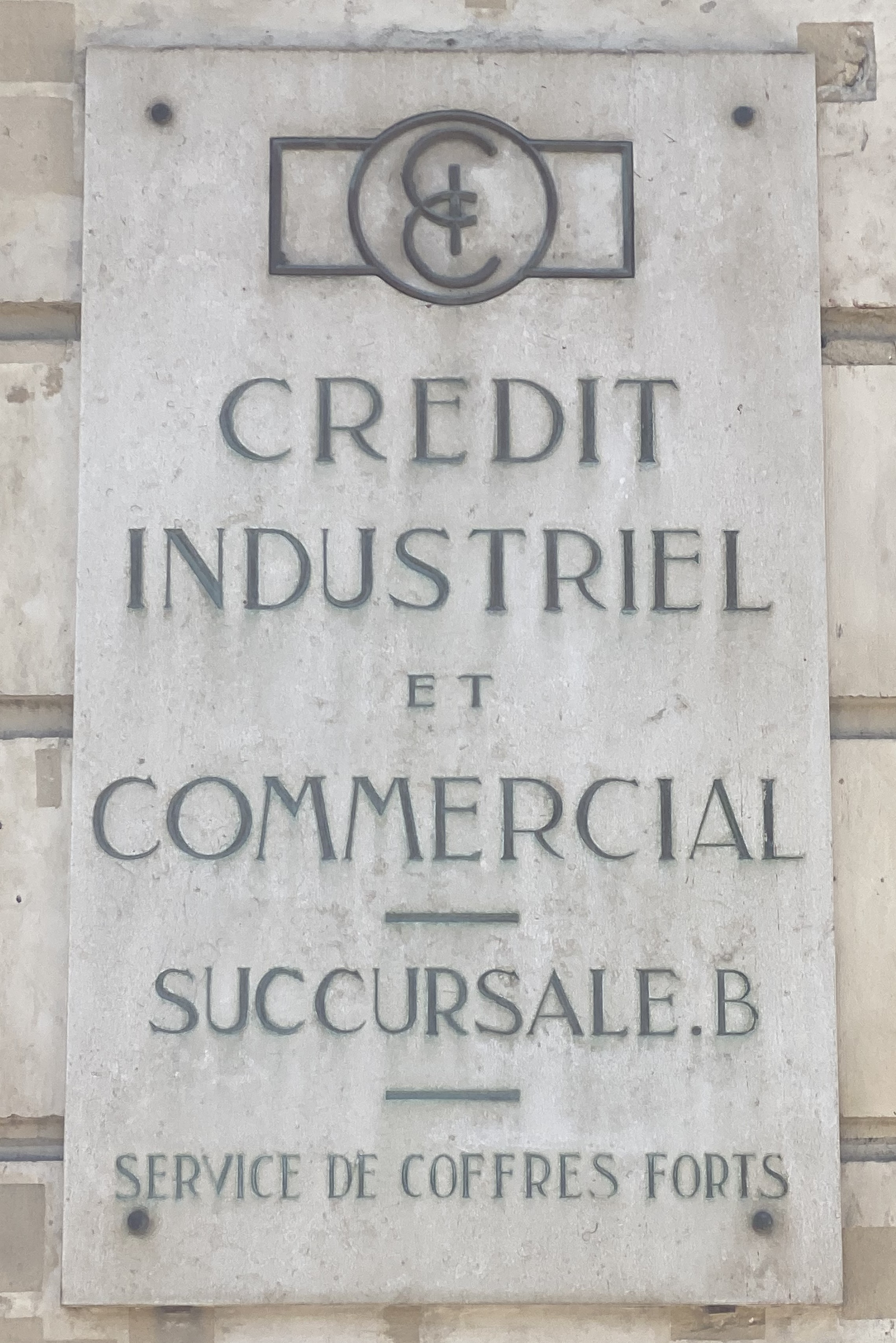
A former CIC logo at the branch on Place des Victoires in Paris

As of 2006, CIC had 1,890 branches and over 24,000 employees serving over 3.6 million customers. As of 2011, the company offers savings accounts, mortgages, and loans; it also owns stakes in specialized entities involved in private banking, asset management, leasing, securities brokerage, and property/casualty insurance.

== Controversies ==
=== Check processing fees ===
In 2010 the French government's Autorité de la concurrence (the department in charge of regulating competition) fined eleven banks, including CIC, the sum of 384,900,000 Euros for colluding to charge unjustified fees on check processing, especially for extra fees charged during the transition from paper check transfer to "Exchanges Check-Image" electronic transfer.

=== National Bank of Haiti ===
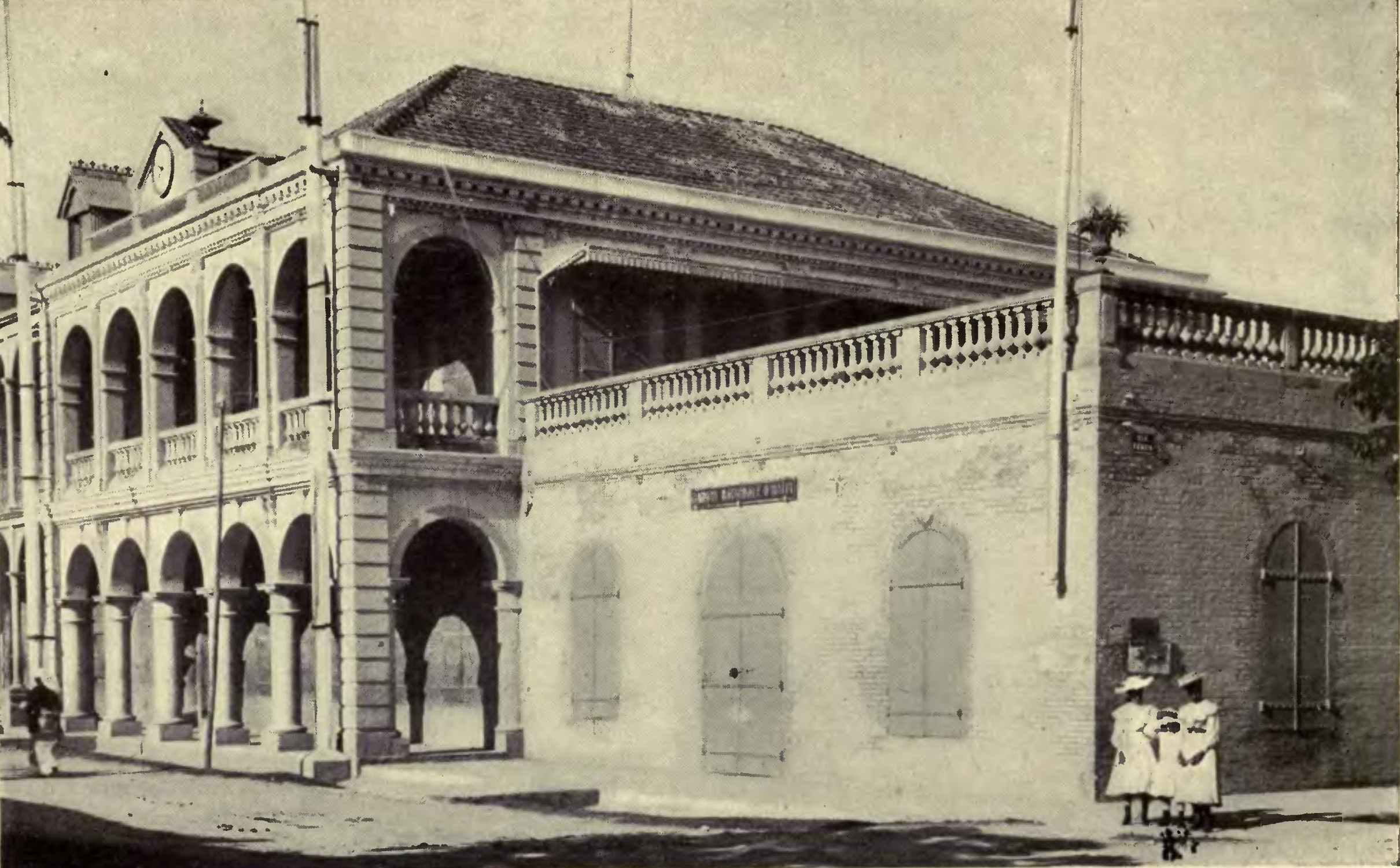
The National Bank of Haiti office in Port-au-Prince, 1907

In 1881, CIC set up the National Bank of Haiti to serve central banking functions to the country, by concession from the Haiti government. A subsidiary of CIC, the National Bank had effective control of the Treasury of Haiti, controlling all receipt of public revenues and giving advances to fund the government. The National Bank, using practices sharply criticized e.g. by Haiti statesman Frédéric Marcelin, paid the shareholders of CIC with dividends collected from incomes and taxes collected from ordinary Haitian people and goods like sugar and coffee produced by Haitian farmers, with returns as high as 37% in 1888 and 20.3% in 1900.

A New York Times investigation in 2022, as a part of a broader report about Haiti, suggested that half of the taxes on Haiti’s coffee crop, by far its most important source of revenue, went to French investors at CIC and the National Bank. The pattern of exploitation was part of a larger context of French banking forays into Caribbean countries, in which CIC participated alongside other French institutions. Successive Haitian governments collaborated with The National Bank: for example with the help of the Domingue government a loan arrangement was made for 50 million Francs, for which the initial payment of the ~15 million was made in March 1875, against the 7 million received by Haiti's Treasury at the time. Currency manipulation was observed because the Haitian Government asked the National Bank to print money to cover the deficits of the payments made to institutions like the CIC.

In 1896, the CIC also successfully managed to secure a second loan of 50,000,000 francs, at 6% interest. Over three decades, French shareholders made profits of at least $136 million in today’s dollars from Haiti’s national bank — about an entire year’s worth of the country’s tax revenues at the time, the documents show. By "effectively choking off the nation’s primary source of income", the CIC "left a crippling legacy of financial extraction and dashed hopes — even by the standards of a nation with a long history of both." The French government sought to distance itself from the CIC because of the criticism of some of the methods used, and the whole scheme came to an end in 1910.
