= Geneva Stock Exchange =

The Geneva Stock Exchange was a stock exchange in Geneva, Switzerland.

The first stock exchange in Switzerland, it was founded in 1850. Initially created as an association of stockbrokers, it was first regulated in 1855.

It was more successful than rival exchanges that opened up in Basel (1866) and Zurich (1873), as it allowed public access. It attracted a lot of attention from banks in German-speaking Switzerland in the 1920s and 1930s and the dominance of the Geneva Stock Exchange formed the basis of Geneva's prominence in international finance.

It merged into the fully automated SIX Swiss Exchange electronic trading exchange between 1993 and 1995.
