= Comptoir d'Escompte de Mulhouse =

Bank based in Mulhouse

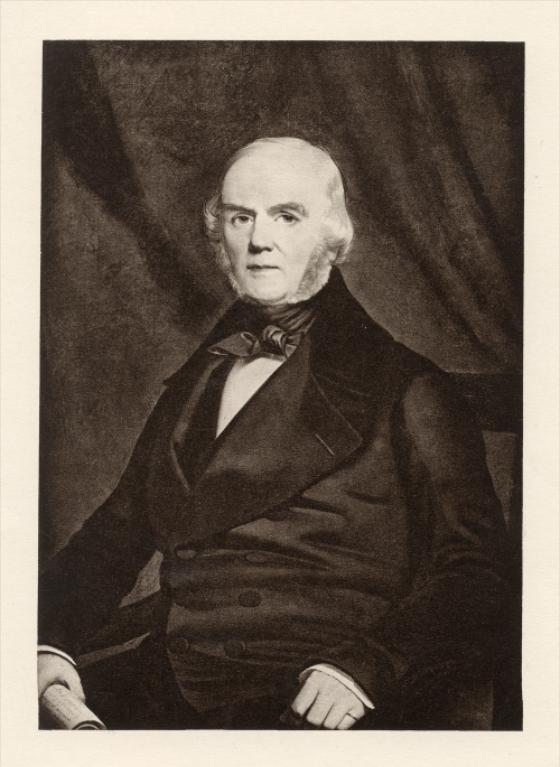
- Nicolas Koechlin (1781-1852), first director of the Comptoir National d'Escompte de Mulhouse
- Industry: Financial services
- Founded: 1848
- Defunct: 1930
- Fate: Merged
- Successor: Banque Nationale de Crédit
- Headquarters: Mulhouse, France
- Products: Banking services

The Comptoir d'Escompte de Mulhouse (CEM) was a bank founded in 1848 in Mulhouse under the Second French Republic, and expanded dynamically from the late 19th century, when it was under jurisdiction of the German Empire following the Franco-Prussian War. It spun off its French network in 1913 as the Banque Nationale de Crédit, which eventually acquired its former parent in 1930.

== History ==
=== French Second Republic and Second Empire ===
The Comptoir National d'Escompte de Mulhouse was created on 8 March 1848 as one of 65 comptoirs d'escompte or local discount banks under the initiative of the new Republican government, following the financial crisis associated with the February Revolution of that year. Its first director was local industrialist Nicolas Koechlin, appointed by government decree on 24 March 1848. In May 1852, the government withdrew its financial support, and the Comptoir national d'escompte de Mulhouse was one of less than a dozen comptoirs d'escompte that survived, together with those in Alès, Angoulême, Caen, Colmar, Dôle, Lille, Rouen, Sainte-Marie-aux-Mines, Sablé, and the Comptoir National d'Escompte de Paris. Following legal reform in 1854 that relaxed state oversight, it changed its name to Comptoir d'escompte de Mulhouse (CEM).

=== German Empire and World War I ===
Following the French defeat in the Franco-Prussian War in 1870, the CEM's head office in Mulhouse found itself in the German Empire, even though many of the bank's operations and shareholders were across the new border in France. From the late 1880s under general manager Eugène Raval, it engaged in ambitious further expansion in France by buying local banks and opening new branches. By the beginning of 1913, the CEM had 16 branches, 44 agencies and 34 part-time offices, the vast majority of which were in France, versus only three in Alsace-Lorraine and one in Zurich.

On 25 June 1913, in a context of rising tensions between France and Germany, the CEM, by then known under its German name Mülhauser Diskonto-Bank, decided to group its French activities into a separate subsidiary, which was named the Banque Nationale de Crédit (BNC), in which it retained 46 percent of equity capital. Eugène Raval was the BNC's first managing director, then in 1914 became its chairman, taking over from Georges Cochery, and kept that position until 1923.

=== Interwar period ===
In 1922, the BNC acquired the Paris-based Banque Française pour le Commerce et l'Industrie (BFCI). In 1924, it became France's most profitable bank, with profits exceeding 30 million francs.

Meanwhile, the CEM engaged in dynamic expansion of its own, growing from 4 locations in 1913 to 57 in 1930. In 1921, CEM and its part-owned subsidiary the BNC reached an agreement not to compete on their respective turfs, respectively Alsace-Lorraine and the rest of France. CEM gradually sold its BNC shares, partly to the Comptoir Lyon-Alemand) and to the BFCI before its merger with the BNC. Eventually, in May 1930, the BNC acquired its former parent the CEM.

== See also ==
- List of banks in France
