= Banque Nationale de Crédit =

Former French bank

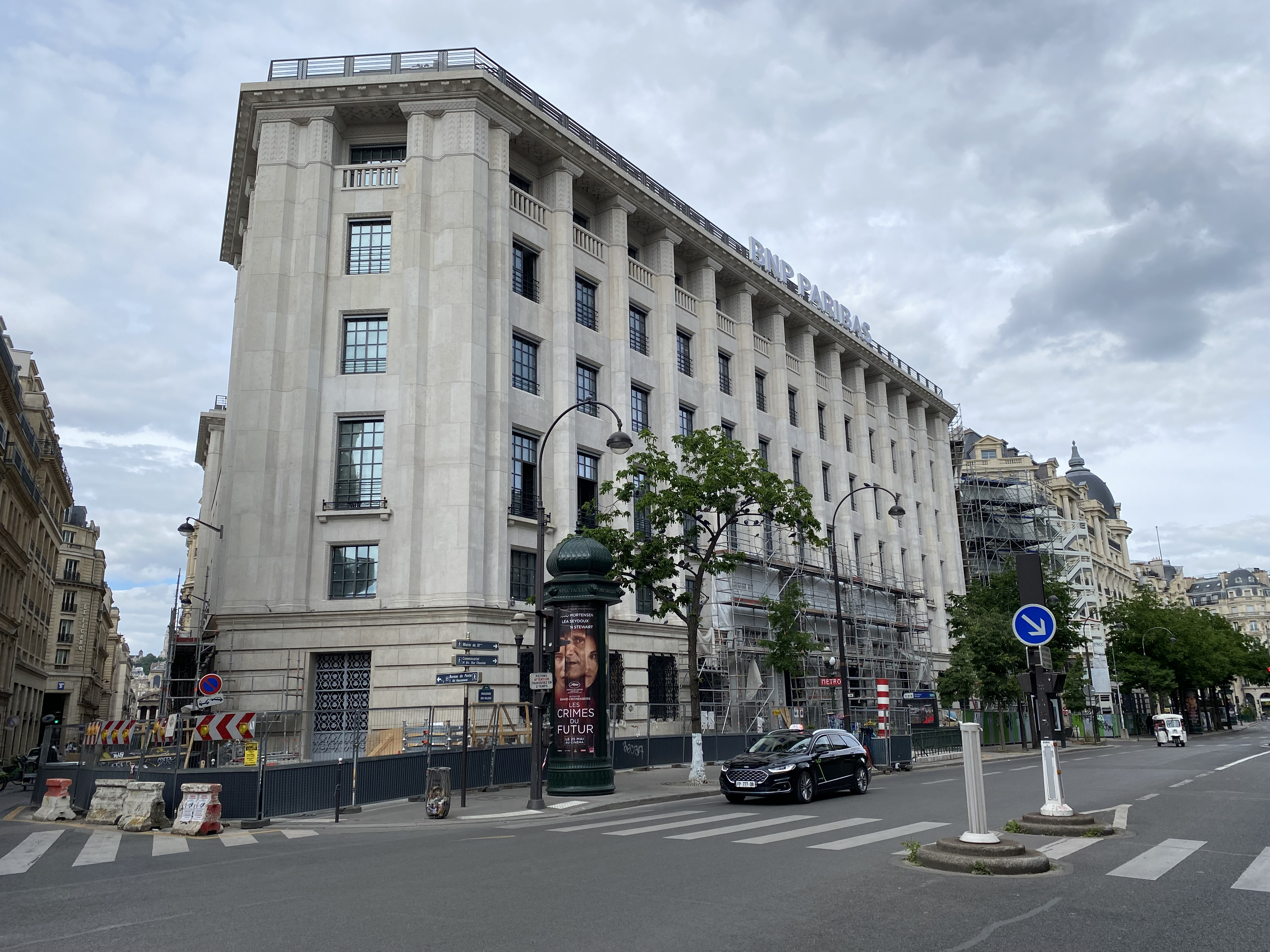
Head office building commissioned by the BNC at 16, boulevard des Italiens in Paris, lately head office of BNP Paribas

The Banque Nationale de Crédit (BNC, lit. 'National Credit Bank') was a bank founded in 1913 by spin-off of the French operations of the Comptoir d'Escompte de Mulhouse, which at that time was under the jurisdiction of the German Empire. The BNC grew dynamically in the 1920s, acquired its former parent in 1930, but soon came under financial distress during the European banking crisis of 1931.

It was restructured with financial support from the French government, and in 1932 became the Banque Nationale pour le Commerce et l'Industrie (BNCI), a significant predecessor entity of BNP Paribas.

== History ==
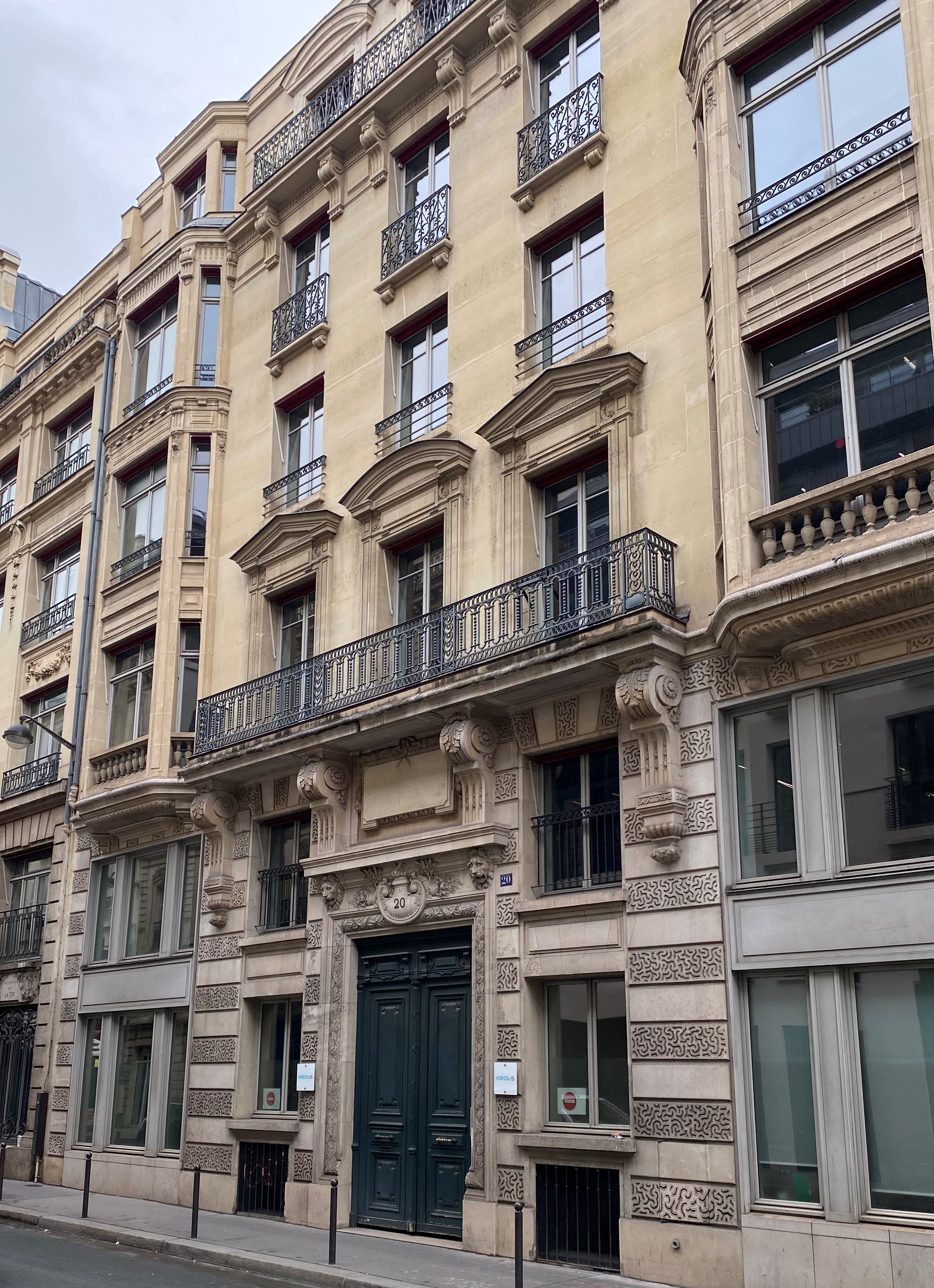
Building at 20, rue Le Peletier in Paris, BNC head office from 1913 to 1917

On 25 June 1913, in a context of rising tensions between France and Germany, the Comptoir d'Escompte de Mulhouse, by then known under its German name Mülhauser Diskonto-Bank, decided to group its French activities into a separate subsidiary, which was named the Banque Nationale de Crédit and in which it retained 46 percent of equity capital. Eugène Raval was its first managing director, then in 1914 became its chairman, taking over from Georges Cochery, and kept that position until 1923. The BNC soon undertook a series of acquisitions of its own including those of the Banque du Midi, Crédit du Centre, Crédit du Sud-Ouest, Banque de Nancy, and Banque de Metz. By 1922, it had expanded to 442 agencies. That same year, it acquired the Paris-based Banque Française pour le Commerce et l'Industrie (BFCI). In 1924, it became France's most profitable bank, with profits exceeding 30 million francs. It also opened a branch in London in 1928, and ranked fourth among French banks by total deposits, behind the long-established leaders Comptoir National d'Escompte de Paris, Crédit Lyonnais, and Société Générale.

Meanwhile, the CEM engaged in dynamic expansion of its own, growing from 4 locations in 1913 to 57 in 1930. In 1921, CEM and its part-owned subsidiary the BNC reached an agreement not to compete on their respective turfs, respectively Alsace-Lorraine and the rest of France. CEM gradually sold its BNC shares, partly to the Comptoir Lyon-Alemand) and to the BFCI before its merger with the BNC. Eventually, in May 1930, the BNC acquired its former parent the CEM.

Partly as a result of its rapid growth, the BNC ran into financial difficulties in the challenging environment of the early 1930s. Confidence in its soundness evaporated in the course of 1931. To avoid a disorderly crash, the French government and a consortium of banks and other companies attempted a rescue intervention. They forced the director (André Vincent, also director of the Comptoir Lyon-Alemand) to resign, and the Bank of France took over BNC debts in September 1931. This, however, was not enough to put an end to the ongoing bank run, and the Minister of Finance, assisted by a group of French banks, went on to provide an additional guarantee for depositors. Even so, the worldwide crisis kept spreading and investors continued to withdraw their money. By late 1931, over 75% of BNC deposits had been withdrawn, causing the bank's share price to slump. In January 1932 the French authorities eventually decided to liquidate it.

The BNCI was created on the 18 April 1932 to take over the viable business activities of the defunct BNC, while the latter's remaining assets were being liquidated in a process that enabled the reimbursement of the French public assistance by 1950 and of other creditors in 1962; even former shareholders were eventually able to recover positive value. The former bank's headquarters and staff were used to create BNCI with fresh capital of 100 million French francs.

== Leadership ==
- Georges Cochery, chairman 1913–1914
- Eugène Raval, chief executive 1913–1914, chairman 1914–1922
- Émile Level, chief executive 1914–1931
- René Boudon, chairman 1922–1927
- André Vincent, chairman 1927–1932

== Head office building ==
The BNC's initial head office in 1913 was at 20, rue Le Peletier. In 1917, it was relocated to 16, Boulevard des Italiens, which has remained the registered address of its successor entities all the way to BNP Paribas. The BNC subsequently acquired adjoining properties, including the famed Café Riche. In the 1920s, in the urban renewal context of completion of the Boulevard Haussmann, it had them all demolished to erect an iconic new headquarters building, which ironically was completed in 1931 just as the bank was going through the financial turmoil that would soon lead to its replacement by the BNCI.

The ten-story building occupies a full quadrilateral city block between Boulevard des Italiens, Rue Laffitte, Boulevard Haussmann, and Rue Le Peletier. That space was formerly occupied by a number of different buildings including the celebrated Café Riche, that were demolished for the new construction. The BNC building was initially designed in 1927 by architects Georges Guiard and Olivier Carré, but the facades were subsequently modified at the bank's request into a more pioneering art deco style by architects Joseph Marrast and Charles Letrosne, while the building's structure was already near complete. Marrast and Letrosne's elevations include monumental engaged columns that are loosely reminiscent of Ancient Egyptian architecture. The metalwork on the ground floor was created by Raymond Subes. The atrium inside is covered by a concrete vault made translucent by the insertion of glass bricks.

== See also ==
- List of banks in France
