= Comptoir d'Escompte =

The Comptoirs d'Escompte or Comptoirs Nationaux d'Escompte, literally "[national] discount counters", were 65 local banks created in a hurry in March 1848 by the government of the Second French Republic to maintain financial stability in the turmoil following the February Revolution. Most of them disappeared when the government withdrew its support in May 1852, except the following:

- Comptoir d'escompte d'Alès (1848-?)
- Comptoir d'escompte d'Angoulême (1848-1897?)
- Comptoir d'escompte de Caen (1848-1874)
- Comptoir d'escompte de Colmar (1848-1884)
- Comptoir d'escompte de Dôle (1848-1892?)
- Comptoir d'escompte de Lille (1848-1866), a predecessor entity of the Crédit du Nord
- Comptoir d'escompte de Mulhouse (1848-1930), a predecessor entity of BNP Paribas
- Comptoir National d'Escompte de Paris (1848-1966), another predecessor entity of BNP Paribas
- Comptoir d'escompte de Rouen (1848-1935), absorbed in 1935 by the Crédit Industriel et Commercial
- Comptoir d'escompte de Sainte-Marie-aux-Mines (1848-1867?)
- Comptoir d'escompte de Sablé (1848-1890s?)

The Comptoir d'escompte de Bayeux was created a bit later in 1853, and went bankrupt in 1869.

== See also ==
- Banques départementales
