= Banque Française pour le Commerce et l'Industrie =

Bank in France

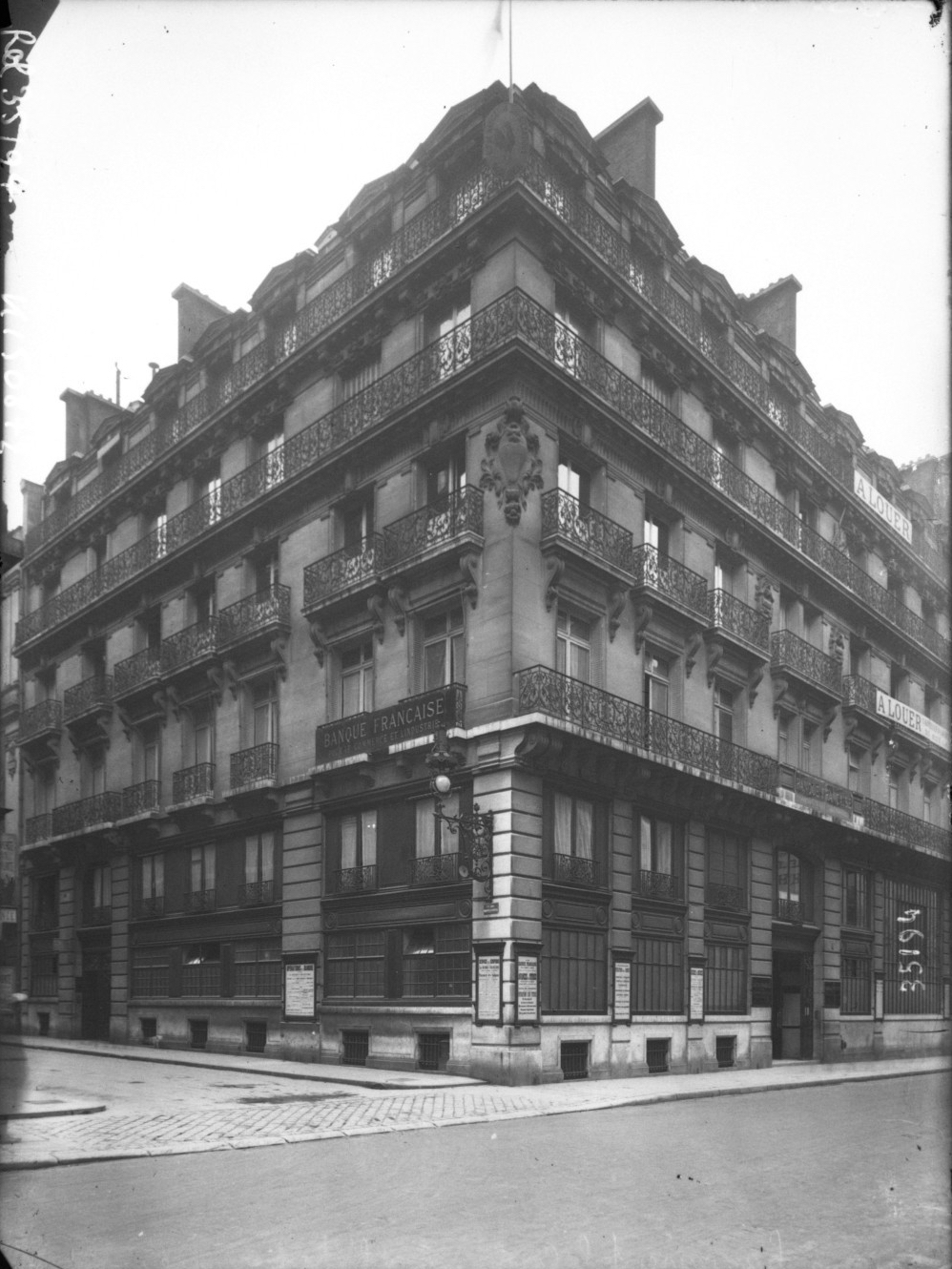
Building at 9, rue Boudreau in Paris, successively the head office of the Banque Française d'Afrique du Sud and of the BFCI, photographed in 1913

The Banque Française pour le Commerce et l'Industrie (French pronunciation: [bɑ̃k fʁɑ̃sɛːz puʁ lə kɔmɛʁs e lɛ̃dystʁi]; "French Bank for Trade and Industry"; abbr. BFCI) was a significant bank in France, formed in 1901 from two predecessor entities, the Banque Franco-Égyptienne ([bɑ̃k fʁɑ̃ko eʒipsjɛn], est. 1870, restructured as Banque Internationale de Paris [bɑ̃k ɛ̃tɛʁnɑsjɔnal də paʁi] in 1889) and the Banque Française d'Afrique du Sud ([bɑ̃k fʁɑ̃sɛːz dafʁik dy syd], BFAS, est. 1895). It was purchased in 1922 by the Banque Nationale de Crédit, a predecessor entity of BNP Paribas.

== Banque Franco-Égyptienne ==
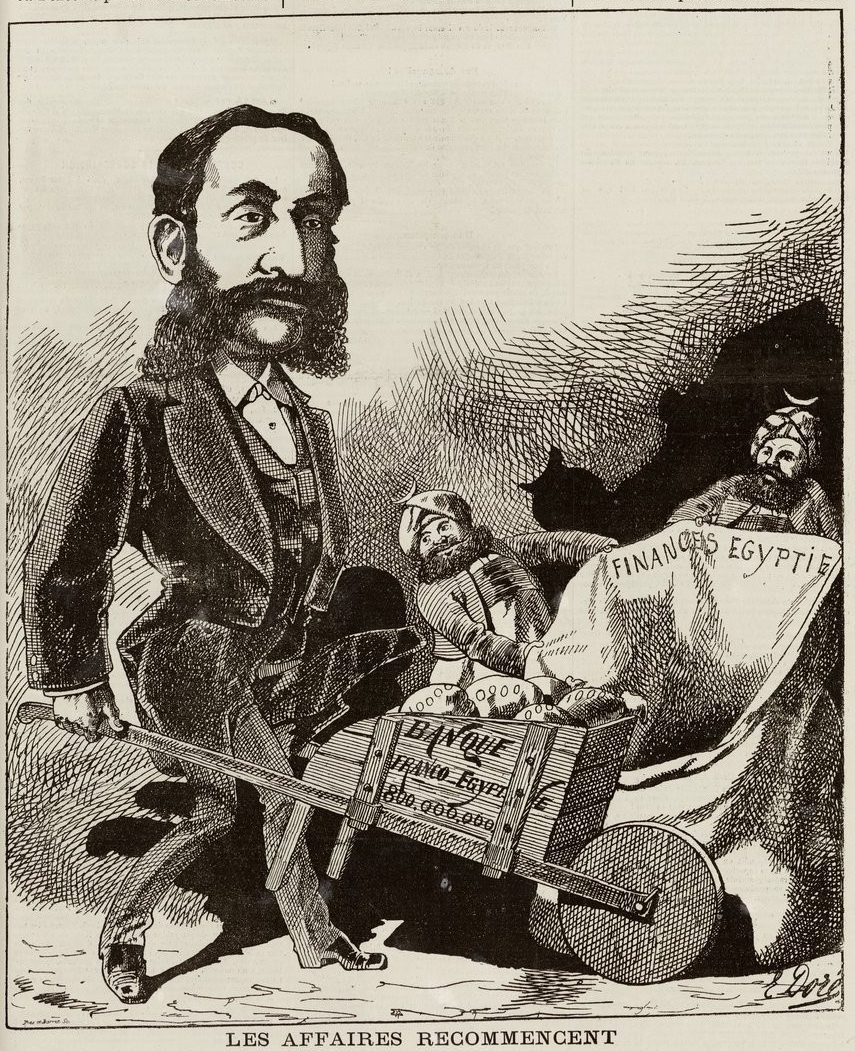
Cartoon of Charles Ferry, a board member of the Banque Franco-Égyptienne in the 1870s, bringing financing to Egypt

The Banque franco-égyptienne (BFE, “French-Egyptian Bank”) was created in 1870 on the initiative of financier Louis-Raphaël Bischoffsheim in the context of financial stress of the Khedivate of Egypt, which had close relations with France at the time. Khedive Isma'il Pasha contributed half of the initial capital. In the late 1870s, Egypt’s growing financial distress led the bank to seek additional capital from other sources including the Paris-based Crédit Industriel et Commercial, Ukraine-born banker Jacques de Gunzbourg, and the Hentsch & Lütscher, Goldschmidt, and Königswarter family banks.

The BFE’s head office was in a building at 3-5, rue Saint-Georges in Paris, designed in 1869 by architect Hector Degeorge, which was demolished in the early 20th century.

In 1888, the BFE led the financing of the Eiffel Tower promoted by Gustave Eiffel, together with the Crédit Industriel et Commercial and the Société Générale.

== Banque Internationale de Paris ==
On 14 May 1889, as the BFE's activity in Egypt had decreased to the point that its name no longer made sense, the Bischoffheim family fostered a restructuring in which the BFE ceased activity and brought its residual capital to the newly formed Banque internationale de Paris (BIP, “International Bank of Paris”). The BIP took over the BFE’s former operations and head office. In addition to the former shareholders of the BFE, the BIP’s founding shareholders included British banker Ernest Cassel as well as the Banque de Paris et des Pays-Bas. The BFE was eventually liquidated in 1892 as the BIP took over all its remaining assets and liabilities. During its brief existence, the BIP was mainly involved in the then-booming business of Russian bonds and their subscription by French savers.

== Banque Française d'Afrique du Sud ==
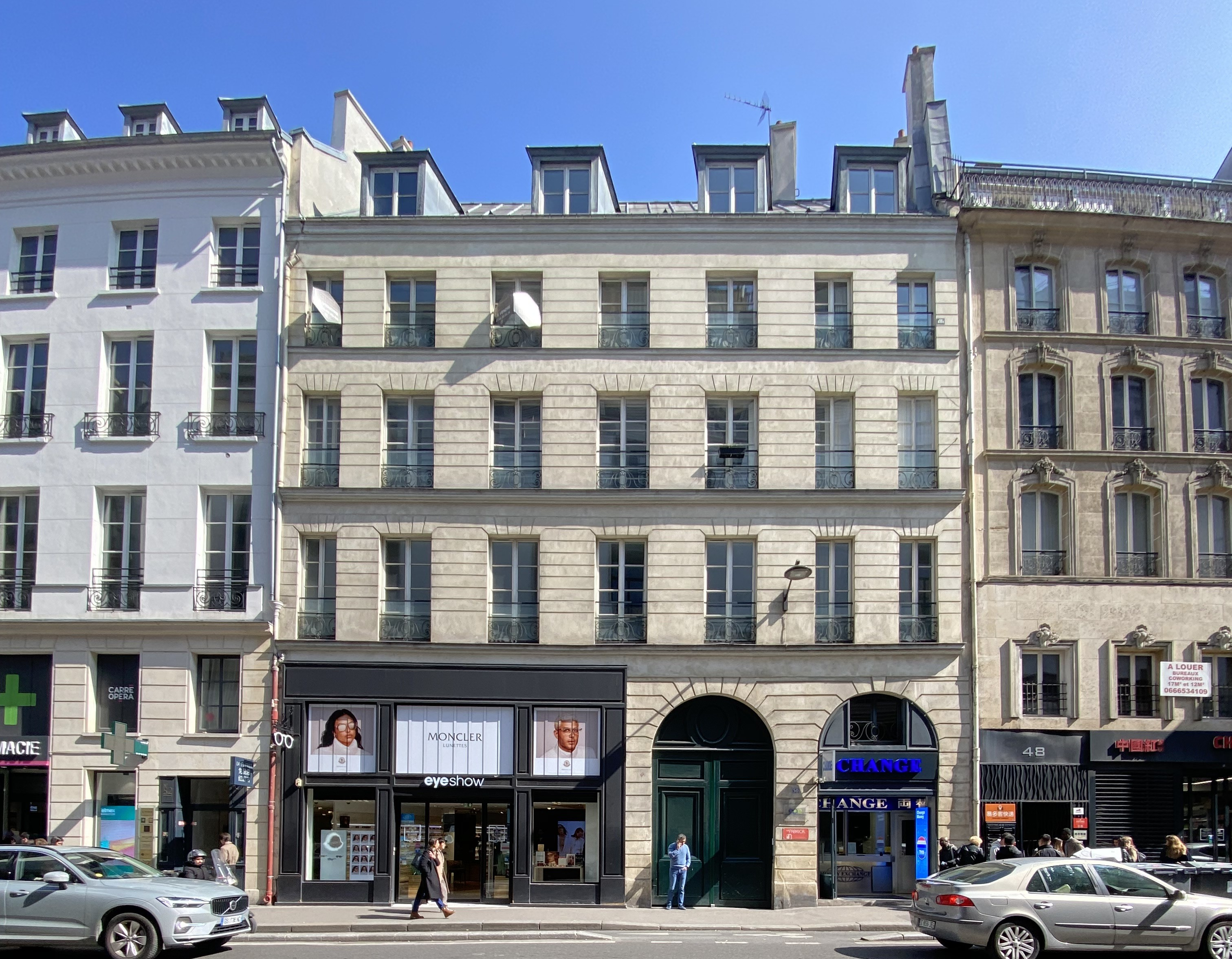
Building at 50, rue de la Chaussée d'Antin in Paris, head office of the BFAS in 1897

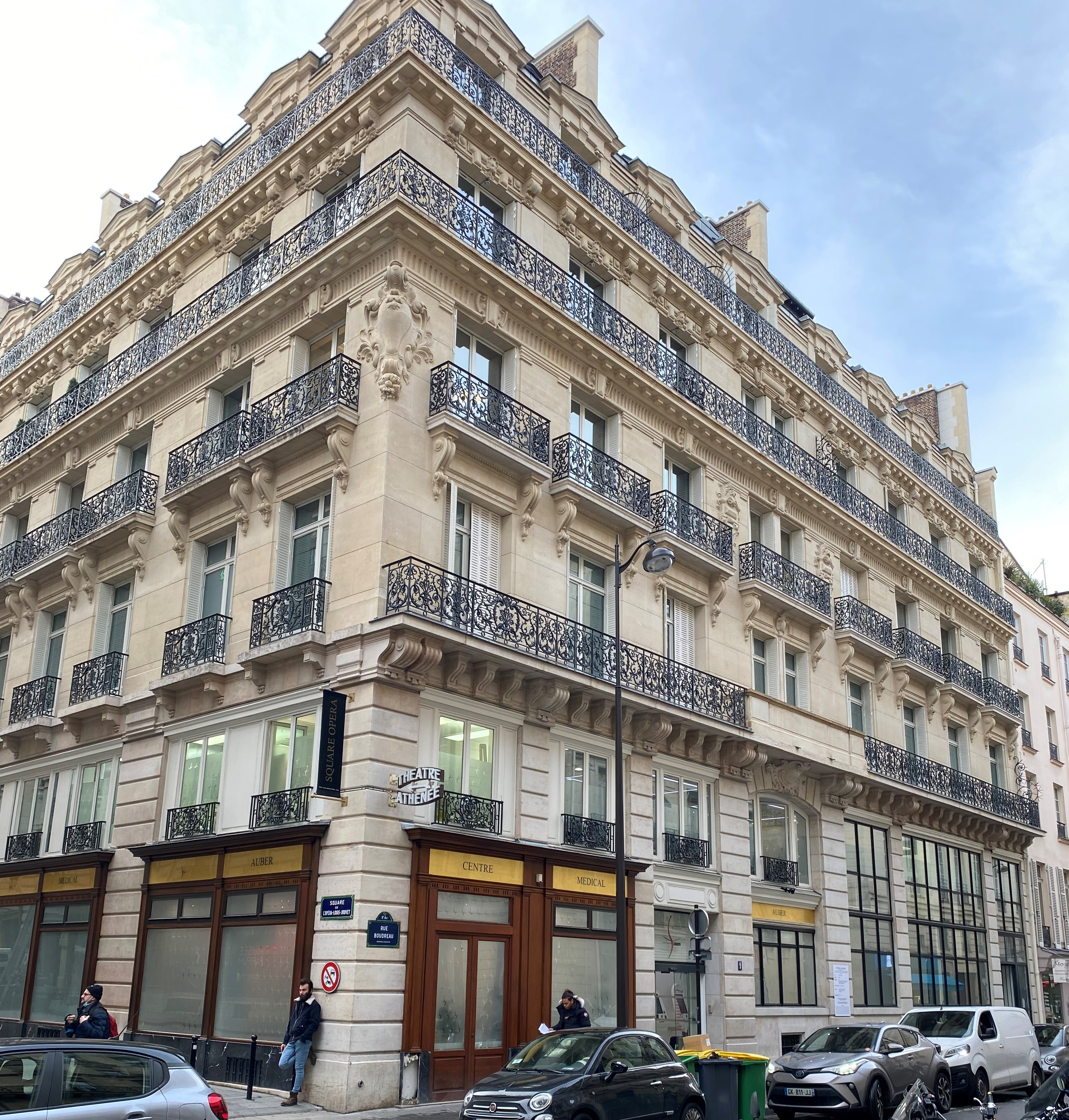
Head office of BFAS then BFCI at 9, rue Boudreau in Paris

The Banque française d'Afrique du Sud (BFAS, “French Bank of South Africa”) was created in January 1895 by Jacques de Gunzbourg, with the aim to channel French savings into investments in South African gold mines. the BFAS also was an early shareholder of the Compagnie générale d'électricité, also founded in 1895. From 1898 its head office was at 9, rue Boudreau in Paris, in a newly constructed block near the Palais Garnier.

== Banque Française pour le Commerce et l'Industrie ==
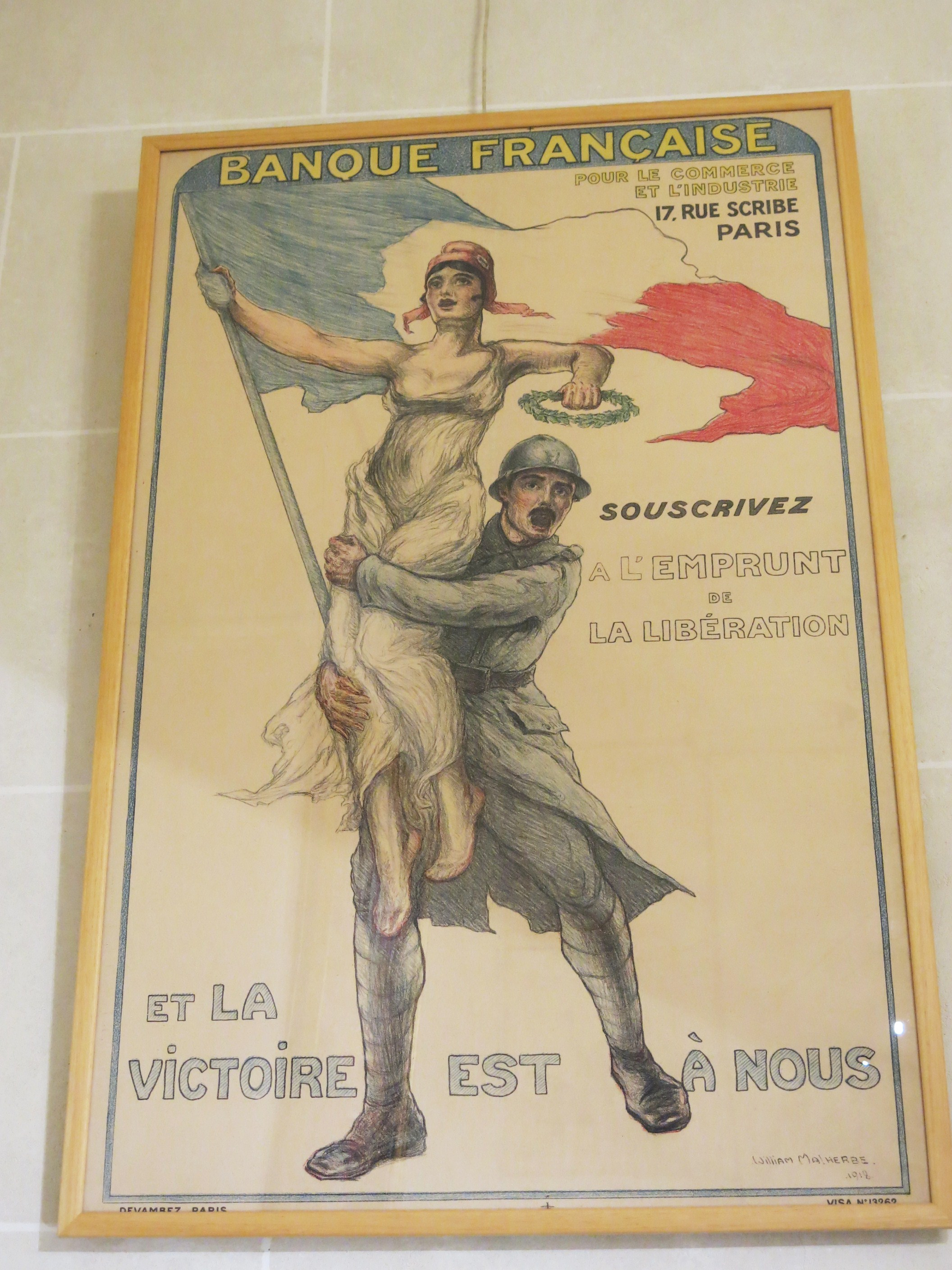
Poster of the BFCI during World War I

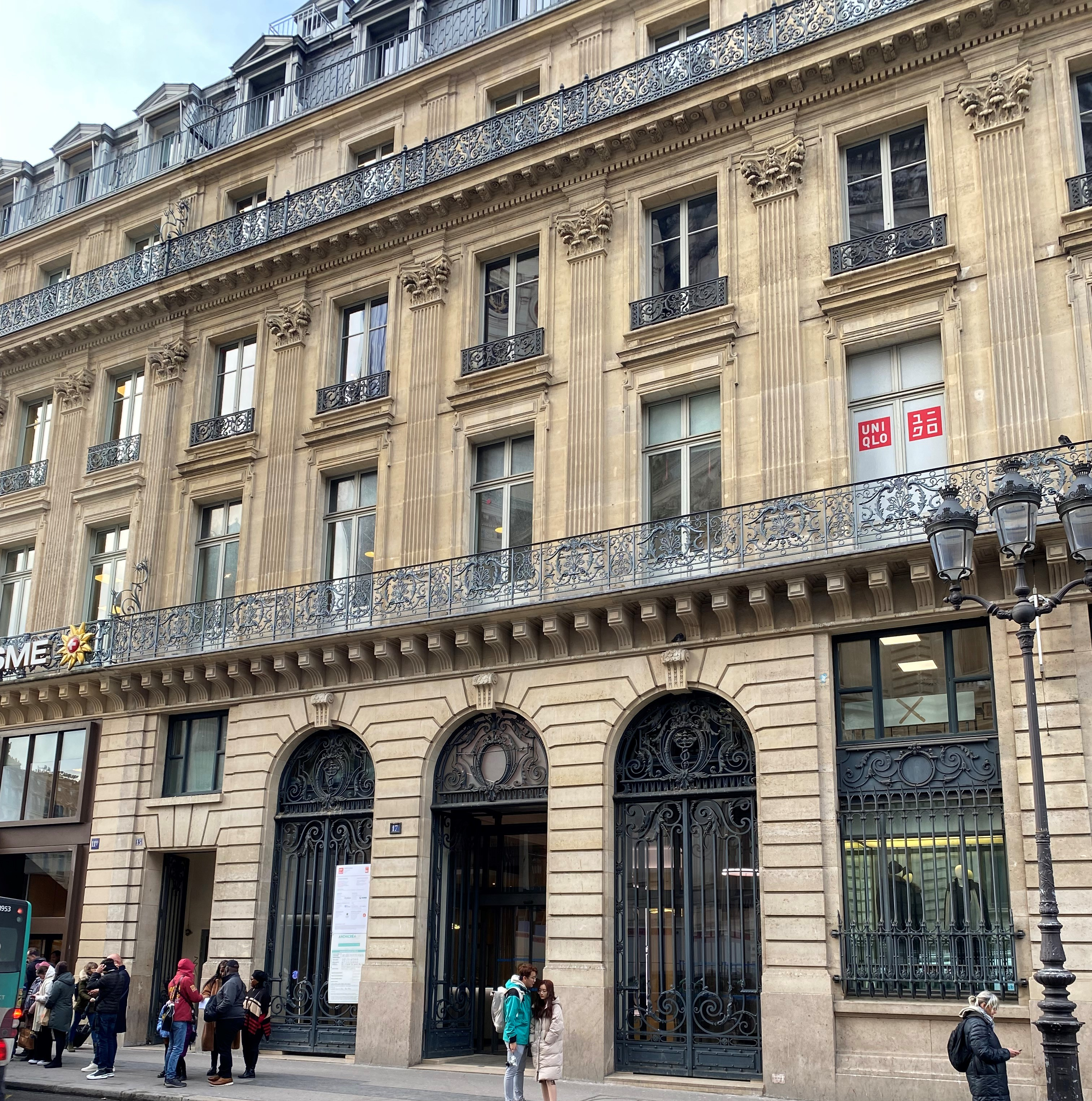
Building at 17, rue Scribe in Paris, where the BFCI moved its head office during World War I

In June-July 1901, Maurice Rouvier fostered the merger of the BIP and BFAS to form the BFCI, which was consequently nicknamed the "banque de Rouvier" or "banque Rouvier". Two thirds of the shares went to the former owners of the BFAS and BIP, both of which were subsequently liquidated; other participants included the Comptoir national d'escompte de Paris, the Société Générale, and the Banque de Paris et des Pays-Bas.

Rouvier assumed the BFCI's chairmanship, and kept it when he succeeded Joseph Caillaux as finance minister in 1902. Ernest May was the bank's general manager. The BFCI developed an investment banking business based on the prior ventures of its two predecessor entities, and also expanded into Brazil and the Ottoman Empire.

== Banque Française des Pays d'Orient ==
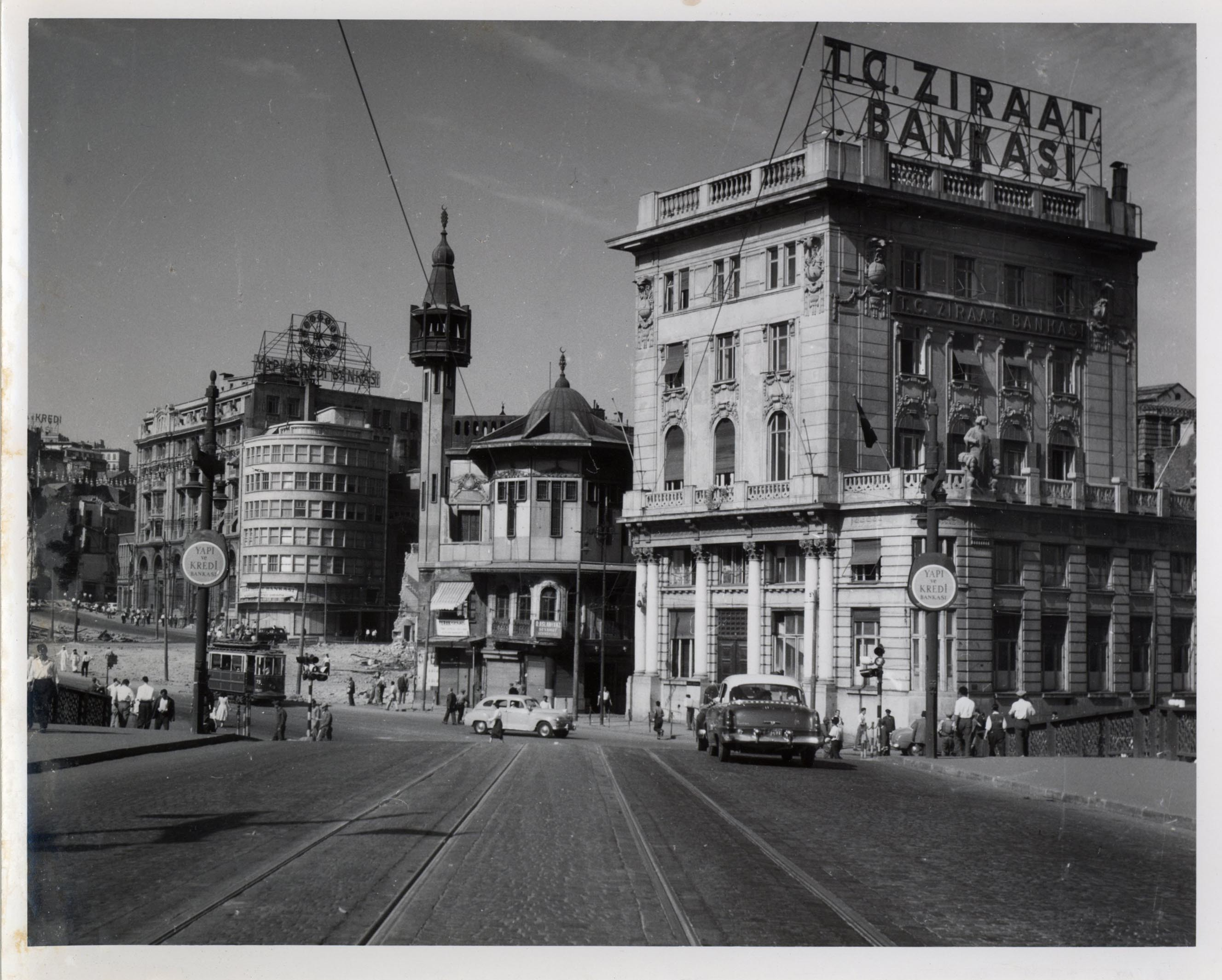
Former BFPO branch building in Galata, photographed in 1958

In 1921, the BFCI sponsored the creation of the Banque Française des Pays d'Orient (BFPO, "French Bank of Eastern Lands"), with other participants including the Crédit Mobilier Français and Société générale de Belgique, with the aim to support French ventures in the post-Ottoman Eastern Mediterranean region, even though in practice it only developed its activity in Turkey. In Istanbul, the BFPO took over the former branch building of the Wiener Bankverein, erected a decade earlier on a prominent location at the northern entrance of the Golden Horn.

Following the acquisition of BFCI in 1922, the Banque Nationale de Crédit became the owner of nearly half of the BFPO's shares. In 1929, the BFPO acquired the Istanbul branch of the Banque Belge pour l'Étranger. In early 1930, its head office moved from the building of the BFCI at 17, rue Scribe, to a new location at 42, rue Pasquier. The BFPO suspended its operations in 1930 and was wound up on 28 December 1933 following an economic downturn in Turkey and mismanagement by one of its board members.

== See also ==
- Banque de Paris et des Pays-Bas, another predecessor entity of BNP Paribas in whose creation the Bischoffsheim family was instrumental
- List of banks in France
