= Banque Nationale pour le Commerce et l'Industrie =

French bank active from 1932 to 1966

Banque nationale pour le commerce et l'industrie
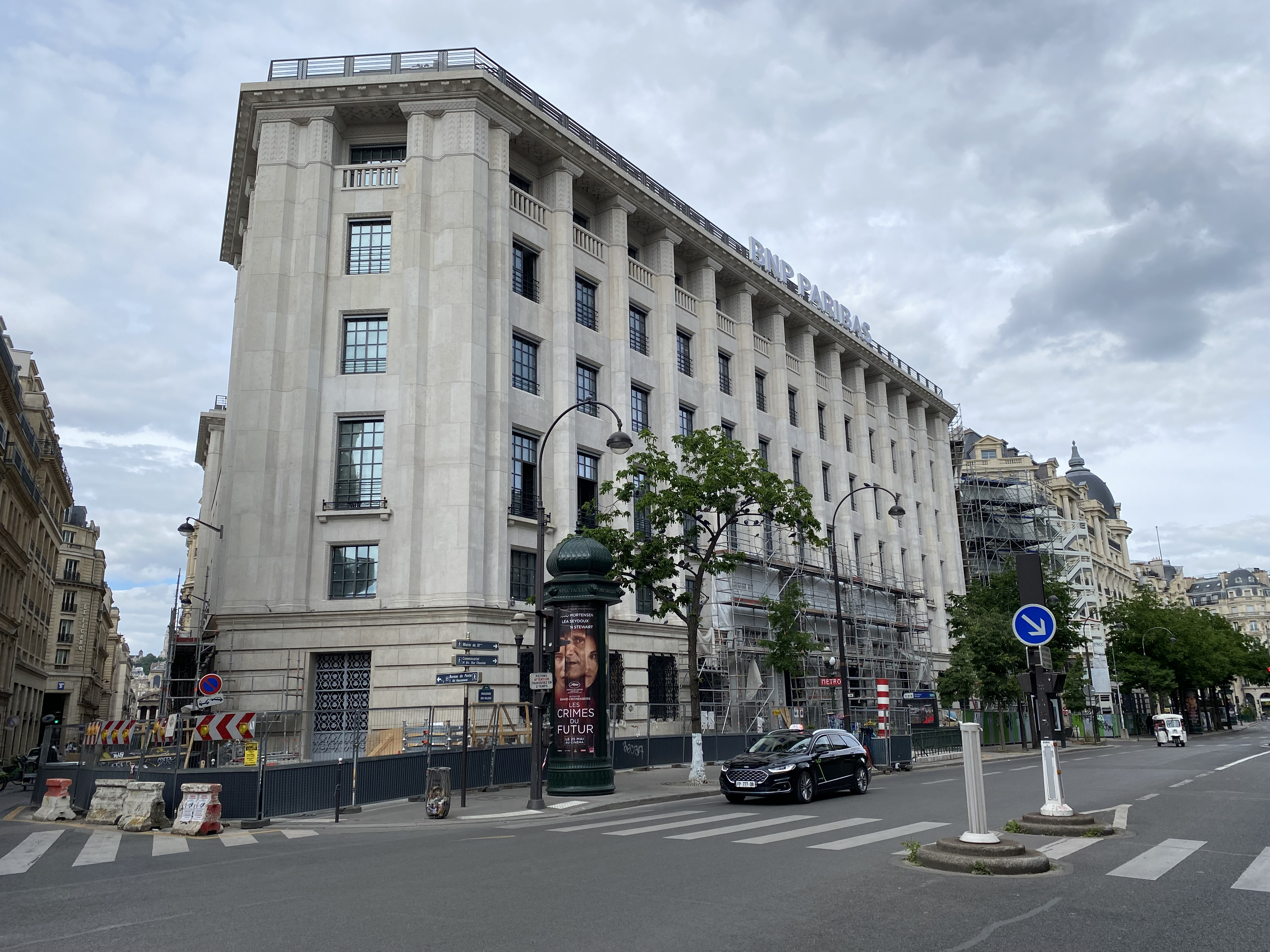
- Headquarters of the BNCI in Paris, 16 boulevard des Italiens
- Type: Limited liability
- Industry: Banking
- Founded: April 18, 1932
- Defunct: 1966
- Fate: Merged
- Successor: BNP Paribas
- Headquarters: Paris, France

The Banque nationale pour le commerce et l'industrie (French pronunciation: [bɑ̃k nɑsjɔnal puʁ lə kɔmɛʁs e lɛ̃dystʁi]; "National Bank for Trade and Industry"; abbr. BNCI) was a major French bank, active from 1932 to 1966 when it merged with Comptoir national d'escompte de Paris to form Banque Nationale de Paris (BNP).

The BNCI was the successor of the Comptoir d'Escompte de Mulhouse (CEM), a bank founded in 1848 under the Second French Republic that had become German following the Franco-Prussian War, and of its French subsidiary formed in 1913, the Banque Nationale de Crédit (BNC). It was one of the significant predecessor entities of present-day BNP Paribas.

== Establishment ==
The BNC expanded rapidly in the 1920s, and absorbed its former parent the CEM in 1930. Partly as a result of that rapid growth, the BNC ran into financial difficulties in the challenging environment of the early 1930s. Confidence in its soundness evaporated in the course of 1931. To avoid a disorderly crash, the French government and a consortium of banks and other companies attempted a rescue intervention. They forced the director (André Vincent, also director of the Comptoir Lyon-Alemand) to resign, and the Bank of France took over BNC debts in September 1931. This, however, was not enough to put an end to the ongoing bank run, and the Minister of Finance, assisted by a group of French banks, went on to provide an additional guarantee for depositors. Even so, the worldwide crisis kept spreading and investors continued to withdraw their money. By late 1931, over 75% of BNC deposits had been withdrawn, causing the bank's share price to slump. In January 1932 the French authorities eventually decided to liquidate it.

The BNCI was created on the 18 April 1932 to take over the viable business activities of the defunct BNC, while the latter's remaining assets were being liquidated in a process that enabled the reimbursement of the French public assistance by 1950 and of other creditors in 1962; even former shareholders were eventually able to recover positive value. The former bank's headquarters and staff were used to create BNCI with fresh capital of 100 million French francs. The French government appointed François Albert-Buisson, former President of the Tribunal de commerce de la Seine, as its new president. Buisson was assisted by Alfred Pose, a former director of studies of the Société Générale Alsacienne de Banque, as the BNCI's first CEO (French: directeur général).

== Further expansion and merger ==
In 1934, BNCI opened a regional administration centre in Bordeaux, and later created seven other regional centers to handle routine branch teller tasks. Starting in 1937 it started expanding by buying a number of struggling local and regional banks. These included the Banque Adam in the north and west of France, Banque des Alpes and Banque du Dauphiné in the southeast, and Caisse de Saint-Quentin in the north, as well as the smaller Banque Roque in Brive-la-Gaillarde, Banque générale de Guyenne in Bergerac, and Banque Dastre in Saint-Gaudens.

Under German occupation, BNCI's domestic business stagnated as was the case with other major French banks, but its international development was more dynamic. Its CEO Alfred Pose relocated to French Algeria following the Battle of France, and in September 1940 acquired majority ownership of a small regional bank, the Banque de l'Union Nord-Africaine (BUNA), headquartered in Algiers at 17, boulevard Baudin. This was soon renamed Banque Nationale pour le Commerce et l'Industrie - Afrique (BNCI-A) and became a basis for expansion over the following two decades in French North Africa, French West Africa, French Equatorial Africa, and the French West Indies. Later in 1940, Pose opened branches in Casablanca and in Saint-Louis, Senegal. In 1941 the bank further expanded in Tunisia and Guinea, as well as Madagascar and Réunion through the acquisition of the Crédit Foncier de Madagascar. It also developed a network in Syria and Lebanon during the war.

In 1945, under the impetus of Finance Minister René Pleven, the French government nationalized the Bank of France and the four major depository banks, including BNCI.

In 1947, the London branch of BNCI was transformed into a subsidiary and renamed the British & French Bank (BFB), with shares held by BNCI, S.G. Warburg and Robert Benson & Co. In 1974, the BFB would return to full ownership by its parent, by then the Banque Nationale de Paris, and was eventually renamed BNP plc in 1981.

The bank's overseas activities evolved in the international context of decolonization. In 1954, the BNCI transformed the Crédit foncier de Madagascar into BNCI - Océan Indien. In 1961, it formed Union Bancaire pour le Commerce et l'Industrie (UBCI) by merging BNCI-A with a separate subsidiary it had created in 1955, Union financière et technique de Tunisie (UFITEC). The BFB's operations in Nigeria, which had started in 1949 with the opening of a branch in Lagos, were restructured into the United Bank for Africa (UBA) in 1961 following the country’s independence; the BFB initially held a 58% majority stake in UBA, but that decreased to 32.5% in 1973 and 25.5% in 1976 as the Nigerian government gradually took control. In the former French colonies of sub-Saharan Africa, the BNCI created national subsidiaries in 1962 under the brand name Banque Internationale pour le Commerce et l'Industrie (BICI, lit. 'International Bank for Trade and Industry'). In 1964, it restructured its Moroccan business as a subsidiary, the Banque Marocaine pour le Commerce et l'Industrie (BMCI, lit. 'Moroccan Bank for Trade and Industry'), and allowed Moroccan stakeholders to enter its equity capital in compliance with the country's policy of Marocanisation. In Algeria, its successor the BNP eventually had to terminate its activity in late 1967 and sold its branch properties to the Bank of Algeria in January 1968.

In the 1950s, BNCI strengthened its position in the domestic retail banking market in France, while at the same time creating specialist services that provided financial advice to French businesspeople and entrepreneurs to help them explore new resources or markets in the developing world. For that purpose it created a specialized subsidiary in 1958, the Société pour le développement international du commerce et de l'industrie (INTERCOMI). By 1965, BNCI was the only French bank with such an international network.

On 4 May 1966, Minister of Finance Michel Debré announced the merger of BNCI with Comptoir national d'escompte de Paris (CNEP) under the new name of Banque Nationale de Paris (BNP). BNCI provided BNP with a large international network and significantly contributed to its asset base.

== Leadership ==
- François Albert-Buisson, chairman 1932-1935
- Alfred Pose, chief executive 1932-1950
- Pierre Strohl, chairman 1937-?
- Jules Guiraud, chairman 1939?-1946
- Guillaume de Tarde, chairman and chief executive 1946-1947
- Ludovic Tron, chairman and chief executive 1947-1957
- Henri Gilet, chairman 1957?-1966
- Gaston Défossé, chief executive 1957?-1963
- Pierre Ledoux, chief executive 1963-1966

== Buildings in Paris ==
The BNCI was headquartered from the start in the monumental building at 16, boulevard des Italiens, which the BNC had commissioned for itself in the late 1920s and was still unfinished at the time of the restructuring.

The building immediately to the east at 2, boulevard des Italiens (and 1, boulevard Haussmann), on a wedge-shaped block marking the intersection of Boulevard des Italiens and Boulevard Haussmann, was built in 1925-1927 on a design by architects Louis Duhayon and Marcel Julien, with a striking rotunda at the tip. On the corner with rue Le Peletier, it replaced an earlier building that had successively been the Parisian branch office of the Russo-Chinese Bank, of its successor the Russo-Asiatic Bank from 1910, and of the short-lived Banca Italiana di Sconto from World War I to its collapse in 1921. It was annexed by the expanding BNCI in 1957 and was lightly remodeled by Marrast on that occasion to form part of the enlarged headquarters complex, including metalwork on the ground floor to host a foreign exchange office. A bridge was added in 1968 to connect the two buildings at the first-floor level.

In 1951, the BNCI purchased the large compound of a former major department store, the Grands Magasins Dufayel in the working-class neighborhood near Boulevard Barbès in northern Paris. The BNCI had the building's 55-meter-high dome demolished in 1957 and used the compound for its sprawling securities services, with up to six thousand staff on site. In 2019, BNP Paribas sold the building for redevelopment.

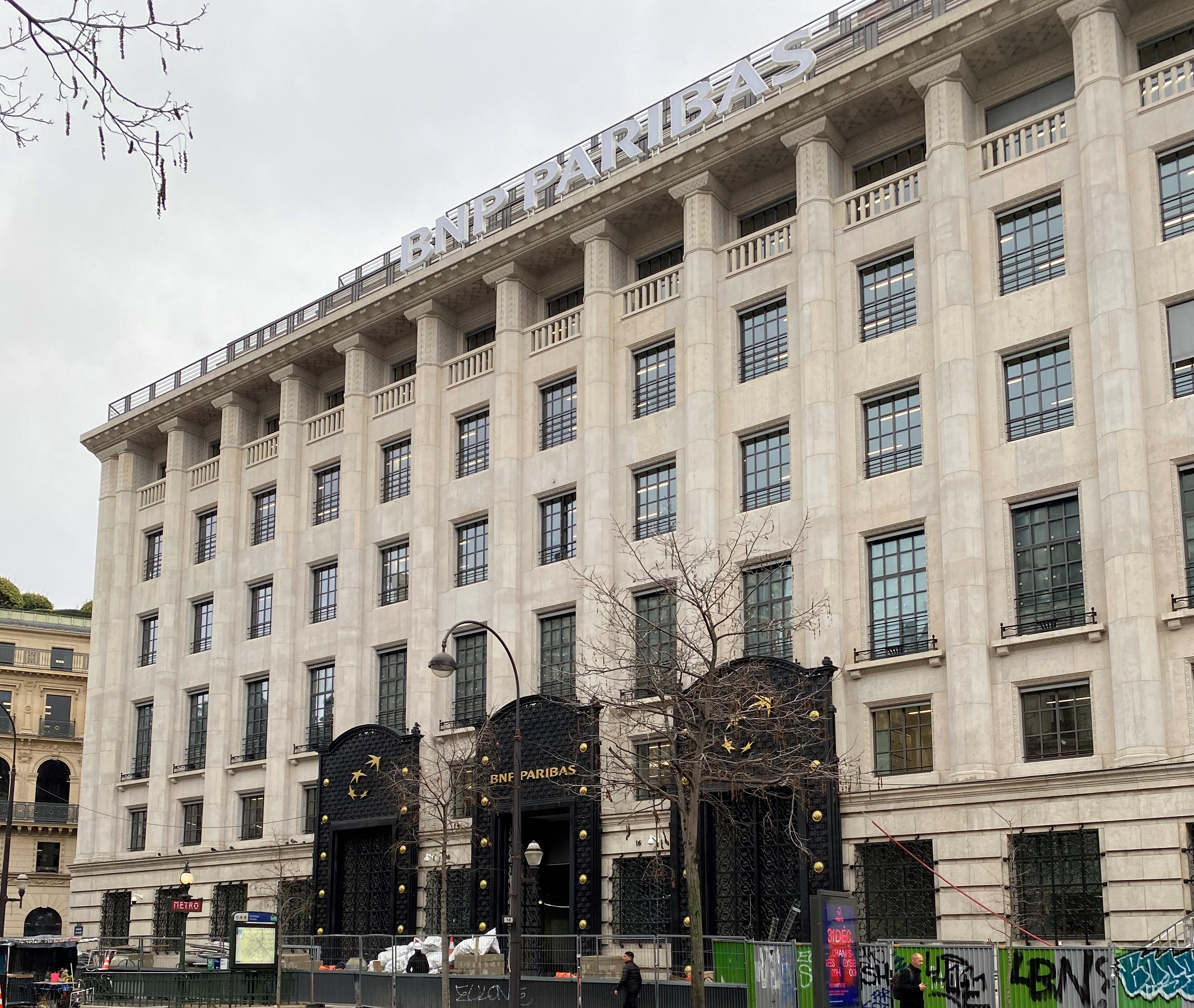
Head office built by BNC and used by BNCI at 16, boulevard des Italiens

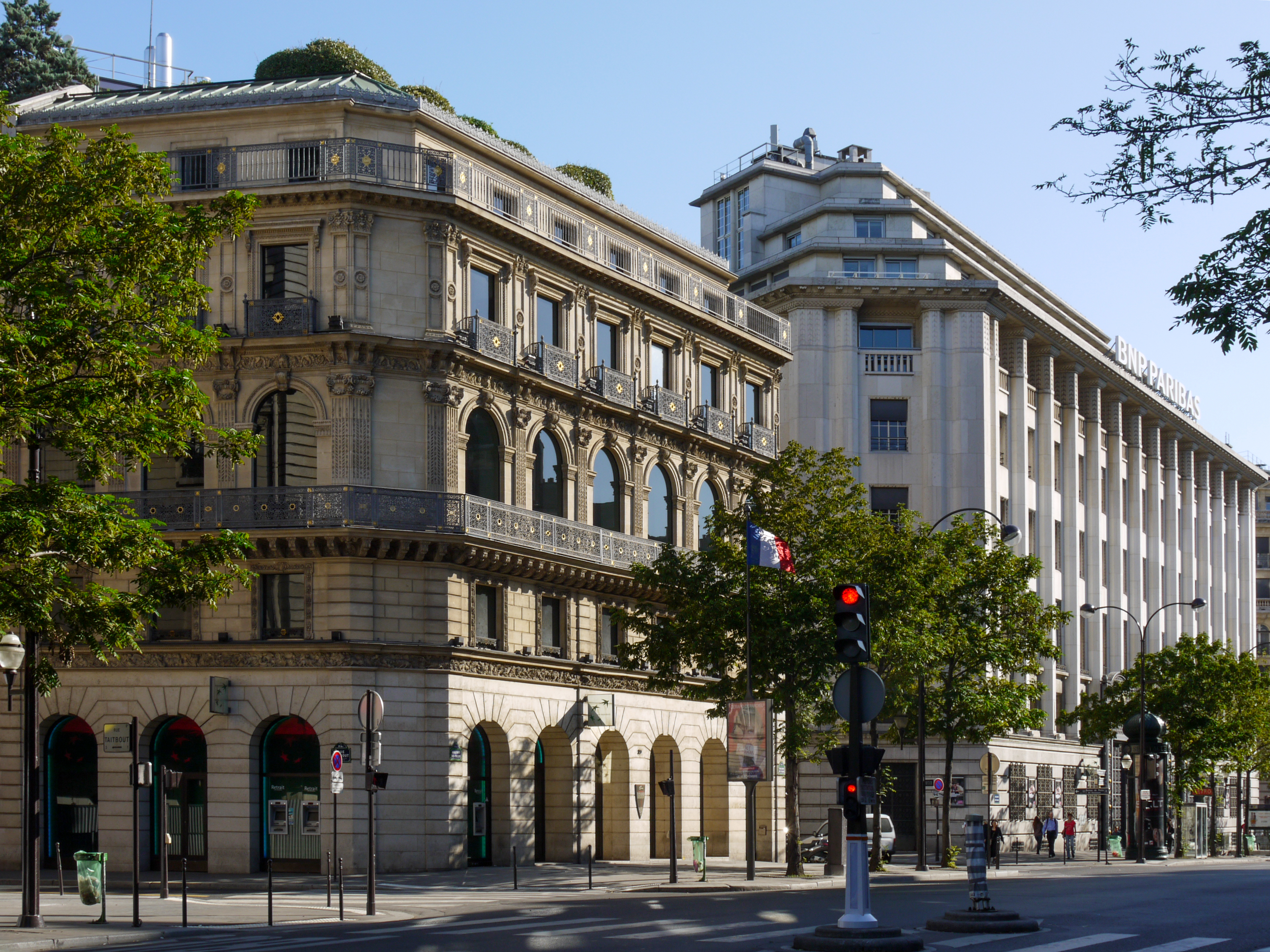
BNCI Headquarters building (right), with the Maison dorée (now offices of BNP Paribas CIB) in front

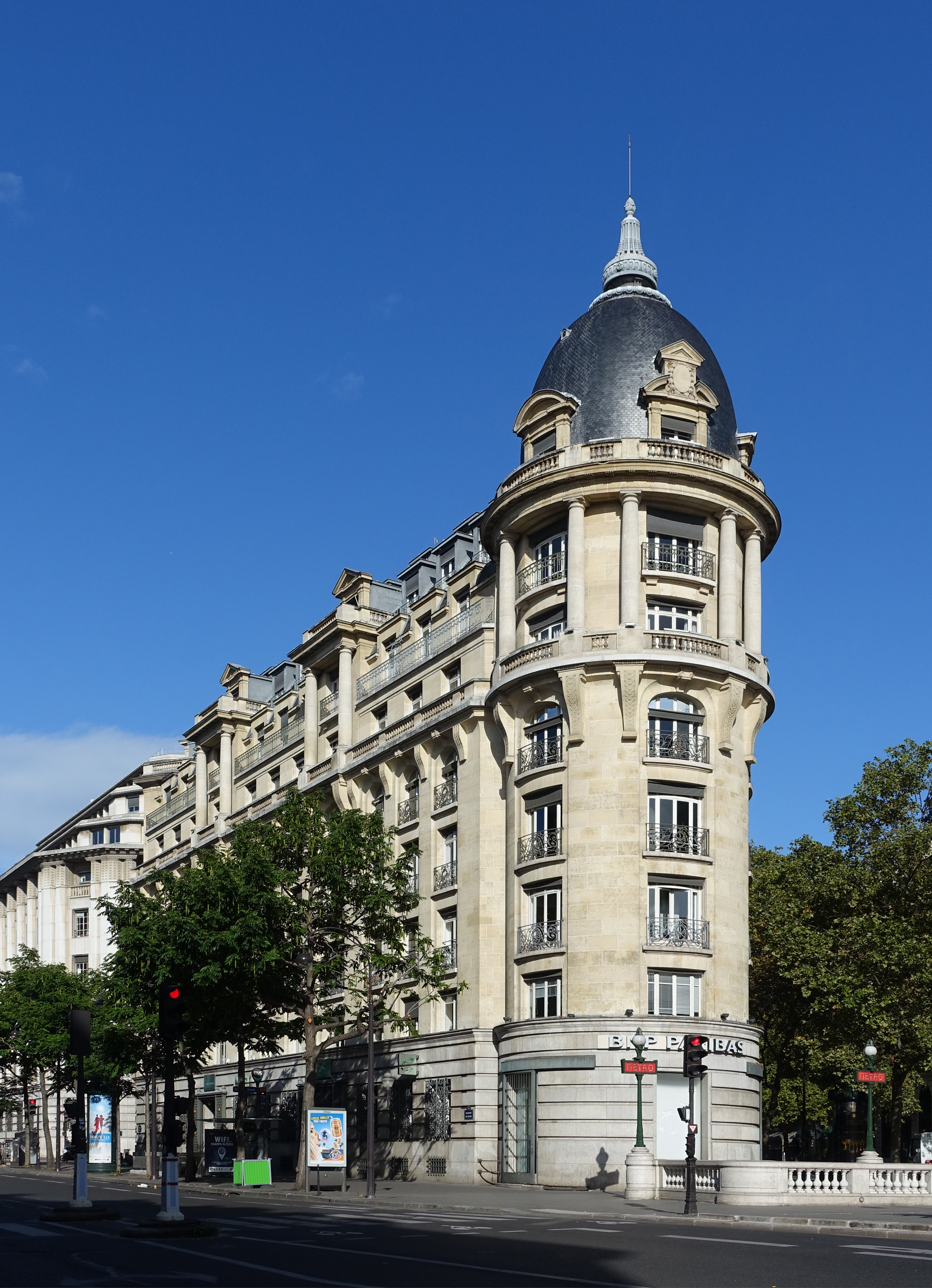
Building at 2, boulevard des Italiens, annexed to BNCI headquarters in 1957

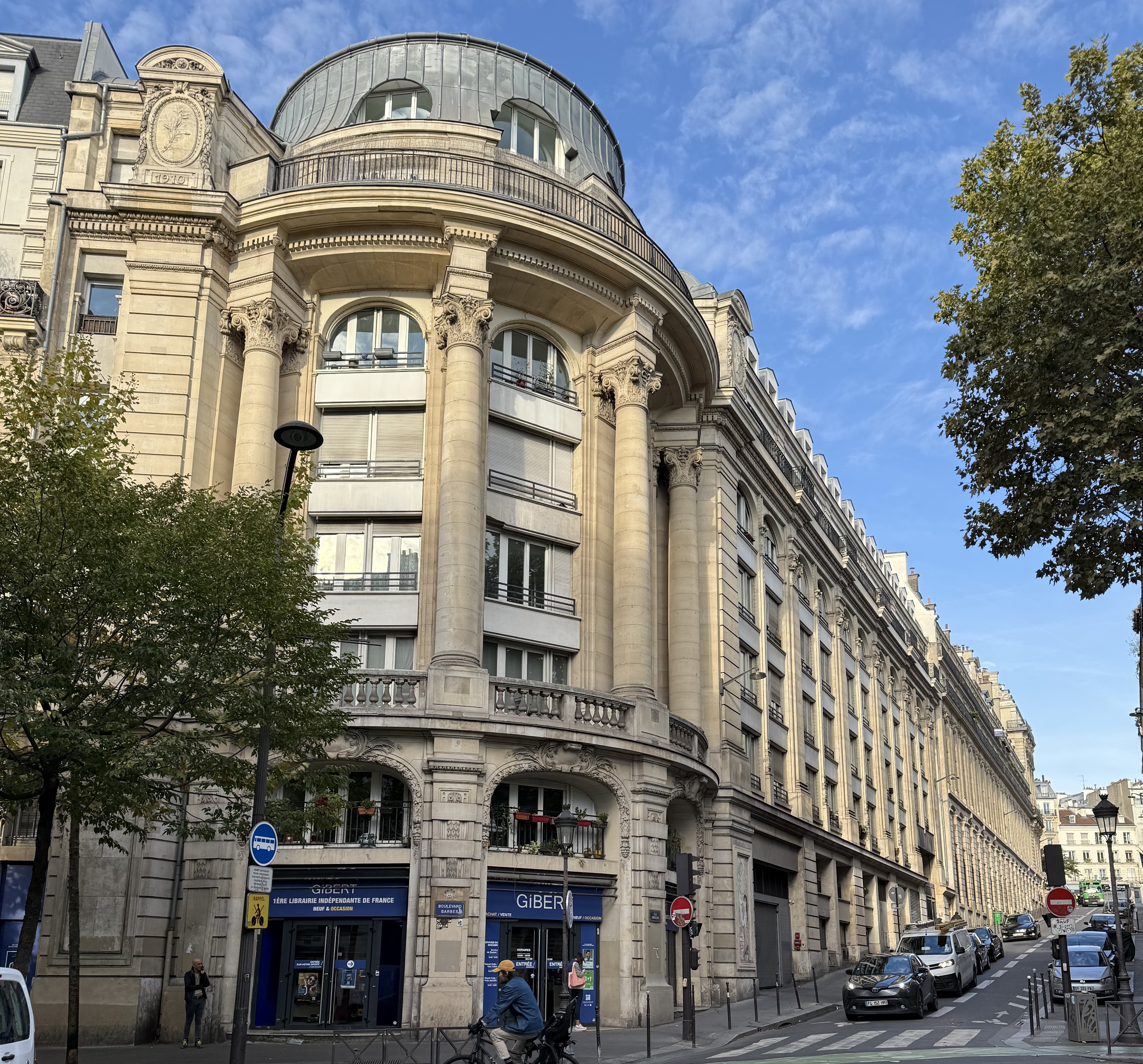
Former building of the Grands Magasins Dufayel, corner of boulevard Barbès and rue Christiani in Paris

== See also ==
- List of banks in France

== External sources ==
- An innovative Bank : the Banque nationale pour le commerce et l'industrie (BNCI) in Source d'Histoire
- Documents and clippings about Banque Nationale pour le Commerce et l'Industrie in the 20th Century Press Archives of the ZBW
