= Comptoir national d'escompte de Paris =

French banking company

- Company type: Limited liability
- Industry: Banking
- Founded: 7 March 1848
- Defunct: 1966
- Fate: Merged
- Successor: Banque Nationale de Paris (BNP)
- Headquarters: Paris, France

The Comptoir national d'escompte de Paris (French pronunciation: [kɔ̃twaʁ nɑsjɔnal dɛskɔ̃t də paʁi]; CNEP), from 1854 to 1889 Comptoir d'escompte de Paris (CEP), was a major French bank active from 1848 to 1966.

The CEP was created by decree on 10 March 1848 by the French Provisional Government, in response to the disruption caused to the prior French credit system by the February revolution. It grew in France and overseas, collapsed in 1889, and was soon reformed as CNEP. It was nationalized in 1945 together with other major French depository banks. In 1966 it merged with Banque nationale pour le commerce et l'industrie to form Banque Nationale de Paris.

== Background ==
The revolution of February 1848 caused a general failure of confidence in paper assets such as shares, bonds and bank deposits, and a rush to convert these assets to gold and silver. The Provisional Government was forced into emergency measures such as suspending payment on maturing treasury bonds, closing the stock market, forcing acceptance of banknotes and restricting the amount of withdrawals of saving deposits from the Bank of France. However, the government would not take action to help protect private enterprises and investors. Most of the private banks created during the July Monarchy were forced to close, and as a result there was no longer an efficient way to convert letters of credit into cash. There were even rumors that the Rothschilds were in serious difficulty and were preparing to liquidate. It was in this context that the CEP was created.

== Foundation ==
Louis-Antoine Garnier-Pagès was appointed Minister of Finance on 7 March 1848 and that evening published a decree that created the first comptoirs d'escompte (discount counters) for credit notes, in Paris and other commercial centers. The organization of the Comptoir national d'escompte de la ville de Paris was defined in a decree of 8 March 1848. The book publisher Laurent-Antoine Pagnerre, one of the organizers of the Campagne des banquets that had led to the revolution in February, was appointed the bank's first Director and chairman of the board. Pagnerre was appointed on 9 March and the bank's statute was established by decree on 10 March. Although he resigned in June of that year, Pagnerre established the main innovative principles that were to guide the bank's future operations.

The Comptoir national d'escompte de Paris was set up as a limited liability bank, a structure that the state had long opposed. The Comptoir's authorized capital amounted to 20 million francs, of which one third was to be provided as cash by subscribers, one third by the city of Paris in the form of bonds, and one third by the state in the form of Treasury bonds. The city and state participation did not involve provision of cash, but was a guarantee in case of a deficit. Despite this participation by the state, there was no guarantee against the bank being liquidated at a loss if necessary. The Comptoir opened for business on 19 March 1848 in temporary offices in the Palais-Royal. Initial capital was just over 1.5 million francs.

A decree of 26 March established warehouses on the English model where manufacturers and traders could deposit their goods in exchange for a warrant that could be discounted at the CNEP "in anticipation of sale". Paperwork was simplified with a reduction in the number of signatures needed on these warrants. It was hoped that this would help kick-start the economy by injecting liquidity. For the first time small enterprises had access to a modern form of credit, which in the past had only been available to the largest companies. Operations started somewhat slowly, with just 244,297 transactions in the first fifteen months worth 192 million francs. Even so, the CNEP was able to pay a dividend of 6% to private shareholders at the end of the first year of operations.

== Early growth and collapse (1848–1889) ==
The 1851 French coup d'état led to the reestablishment of the Imperial monarchy. The publicly available shares of 6,666,500 francs were not fully subscribed until July 1852, when the bank reached a capital value of 20 million francs including the state and city shares. Under an act of 10 June 1853 the bank's articles were amended to become closer to standard corporate law, with the Ministry of Finance no longer overseeing the appointment of officers. The state and city withdrew their capital, with the full 20 million francs now supplied entirely by private investors. With this privatization, in July 1854 the bank took the name Comptoir d'escompte de Paris (CEP), which it was to retain until 1889.

In 1854 the CEP was reconstituted by Imperial decree for thirty years, starting from 18 March 1857, and authorized to increase its capital to 40 million francs. As of 18 March 1857 four subsidiaries were formed to provide credit respectively to entrepreneurs, metals, colonial foodstuffs, and railways. In the 1856/1857 fiscal year the CEP processed almost 615 million francs of warrants in 722,265 transactions. This was slightly down from 650 million francs and 736,380 transactions the previous year.

In 1867, the CEP's first French agency outside Paris opened in Nantes, which maintained close relations with the West Indies. Then came Lyon (1868), hub of the French silk industry, and Marseille (1869), France's gateway to the Mediterranean and Middle East. In an 1884 review of the French economy, the CEP was described as the third pillar of the financial establishment after the Bank of France and Crédit Foncier. Effective 18 March 1887, the CEP's banking license was extended by the French Republic for a further twenty years.

=== Overseas expansion ===
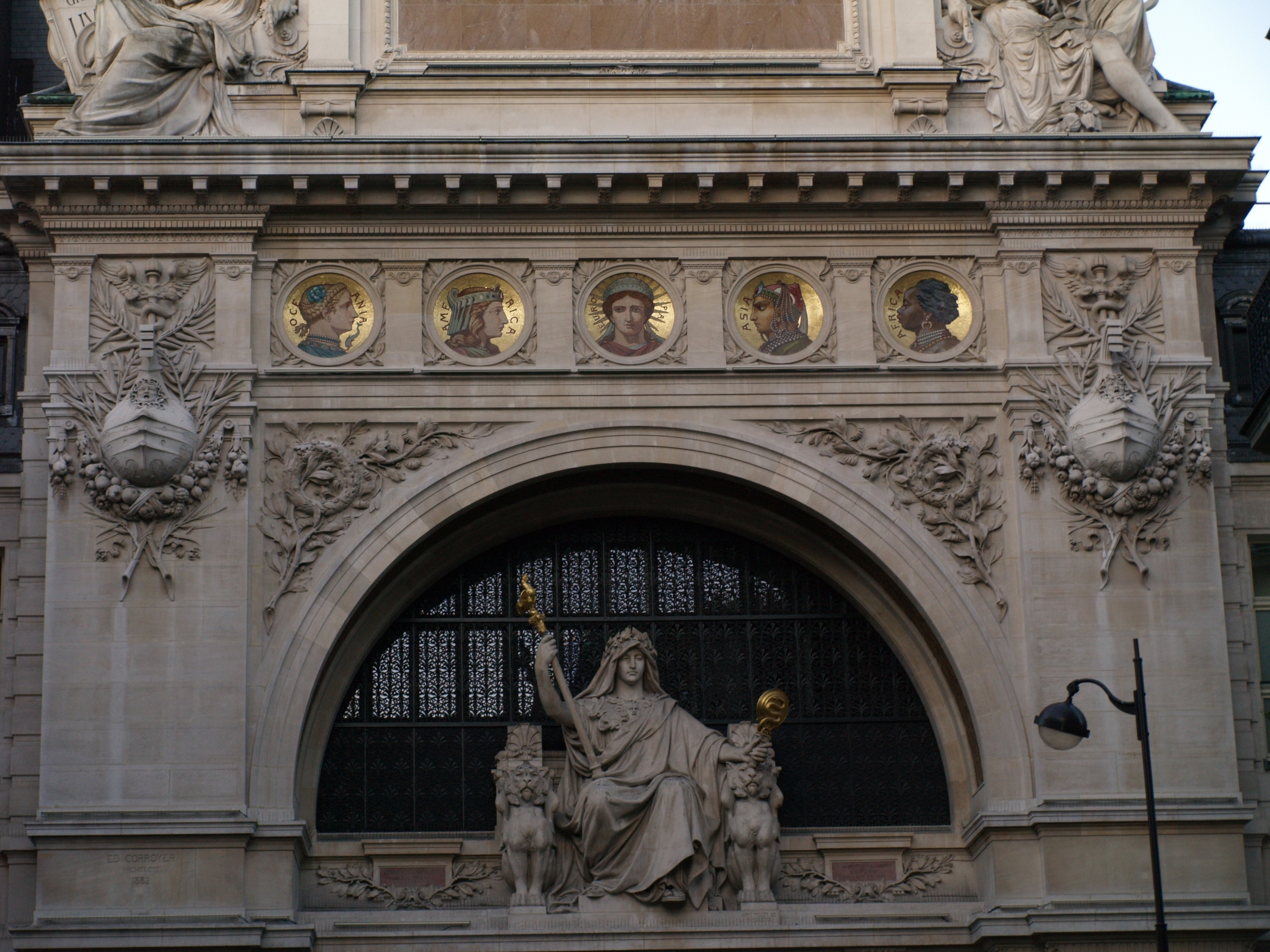
Mosaic medallions of the five continents on the new facade of the CEP headquarters building (early 1880s), signaling the bank's ambitions of worldwide expansion

Following an imperial decree of 25 May 1860 that allowed it to set up branches in the French colonies and abroad, the CEP became the French bank with the most international activity, a position it kept for several decades afterwards. The environment was favorable to overseas expansion, as the signing in early 1860 of the Cobden–Chevalier Treaty between France and the UK encouraged bilateral and global trade.

The CEP created branches in Shanghai and Calcutta in 1860, at Réunion, Bombay, Hong Kong and Saigon in 1862, and London and Yokohama in 1867. In 1864 the Governor General of India approved an act enabling the Comptoir d'Escompte of Paris "to sue and be sued" in the name of the chief manager of its agencies in India, and this was extended in February 1867. Such an act recognized the bank as a legal entity and helped it to operate in India. It was a clear desire to compete with British banks and trade on their own turf, into which French exporters and importers wanted to break in; the first branches were opened in areas of English influence. It also provided a way of finding new supplier networks for Europe, which in the 1860s suffered a shortage of cotton as a result of the American Civil War.

In 1875, the CEP participated together with rival Crédit Industriel et Commercial in the creation of the Banque de l'Indochine, to which it contributed its branches in Saigon and Pondicherry. The CEP's influence remained dominant in the governance of the Banque de l'Indochine until 1889, and remained significant even after that date.

It opened further branches in San Francisco in 1877, Alexandria (followed by Cairo in 1906 and Port Said in 1909), Melbourne and Sydney in 1881, and Madagascar in 1885.

=== Staffing policies ===
In the early years of the bank the executives often had little formal education, but by the late 19th century secondary education had become more common. Applicants to become inspectors at the bank, who formed an elite corps from which future banking leaders were drawn, were expected to be proficient in law, economics or business. From 1901 they were subject to an entrance examination. Increasingly the senior executives had university degrees, often in law, with talented men from poor families able to rise to the highest levels. In addition to academic qualifications, future leaders were valued for their "character", intelligence, organization, adaptability and judgement of risks.

Alexis Rostand, head of the CEP's branch at Marseille from 1876, became the bank's head during the 1889 restructuring, director-general from 1902 to 1908 and chairman from 1908 to 1919. His assistant and successor Paul Boyer also worked his way up from the bottom, running an agency for a while, then becoming a director, director-general from 1915 to 1926 and president from 1919 to 1939. He was succeeded as director-general in 1926 by Alexandre Celier, formerly a director of the Treasury. This tendency to recruit from government inspectors of finance continued with Henry Bizot in 1930, later to be president, and Charles Farnier, a director of the French Treasury and then assistant governor of the Bank of France who became administrator / director general in 1935.

=== 1889 crisis ===
In 1889, the CEP ran into major financial difficulty. One of its leading executives, Eugène Denfert-Rochereau, committed suicide on 5 March 1889, just as the collapse of copper prices following the cornering of the market for copper in 1887 left it with heavy losses. At the request of the Bank of France and the Ministry of Finance, the heads of the other leading banks met at the Banque de Paris et des Pays-Bas in March 1889 to discuss a plan to avoid a general crash by rescuing the CEP. In April 1889, it was decided to start a process of orderly liquidation of the CEP given the evaporation of confidence in the bank.

== Reorganization and development (1889-1945) ==
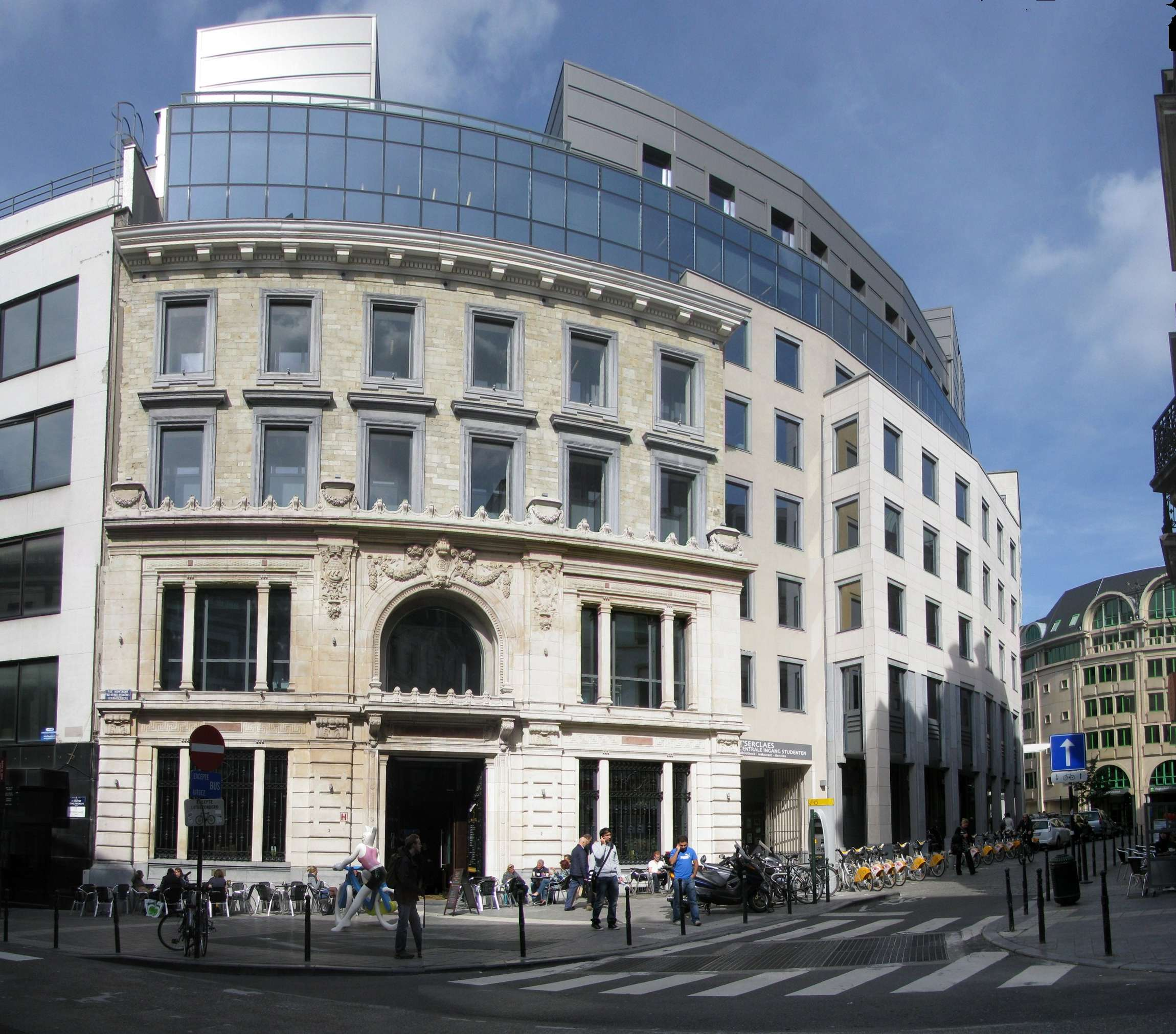
Façade of the building used from 1906 as Brussels office of the CNEP, later remodeled, photographed in 2011

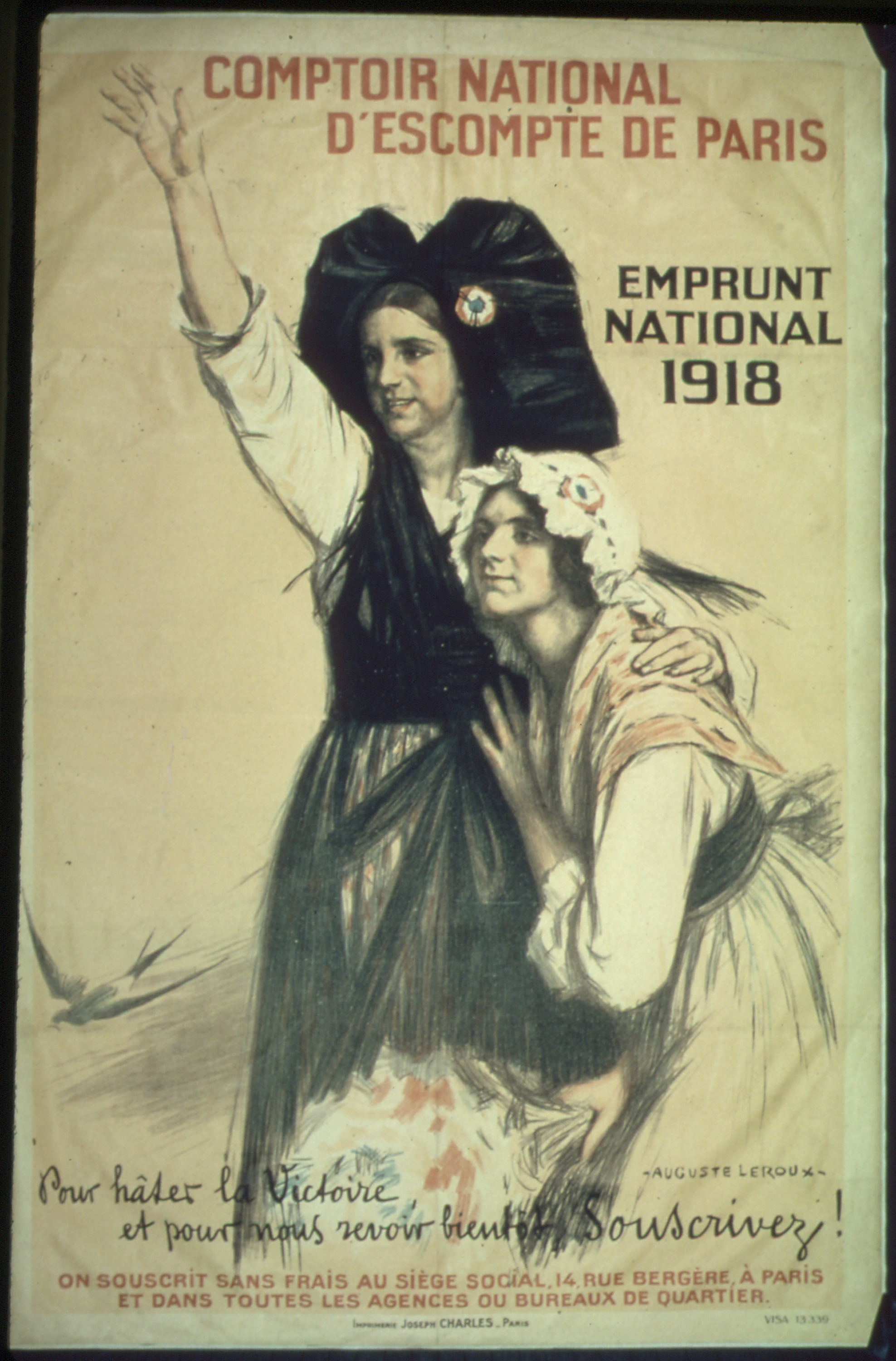
1918 patriotic poster by Auguste Leroux urging citizens to subscribe to a war loan through CNEP

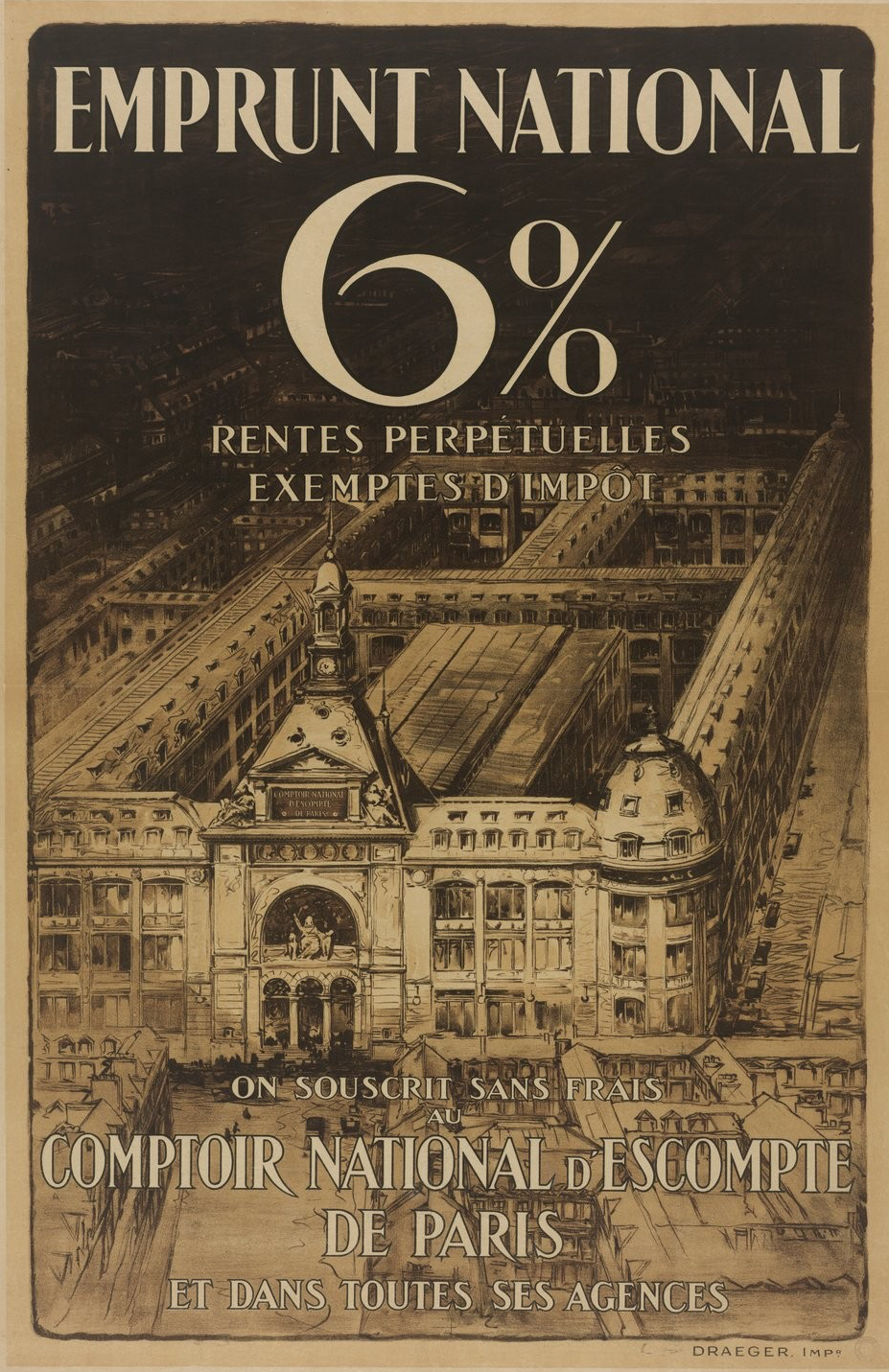
National loan advert (1920) displaying the CNEP's Parisian headquarters building

Immediately after the start of the liquidation process, in June 1889, it was decided to form a new bank - the CNEP - that would assume most of the business of the former CEP. In 1891, it was reported that the bank's restructuring had reached the stage where its last guarantors could be paid, putting an end to the crisis. In the 1890s it expanded into the newly established French protectorate of Tunisia, opening branches in Tunis (1894), Sousse (1895), Sfax (1896) and Gabès (1897).

In the 1890s the CNEP introduced a Pension Fund and Provident Fund for employees, which became a model for other banks. The twenty years from 1894 to 1914 saw rapid industrial growth as cities expanded their networks of trams, electricity and water. The Exposition Universelle (1900) was a symbol of the new age. All this needed funding arranged by the joint stock banks such as CNEP. By 1900 the Comptoir National d'Escompte de Paris was again listed among the leading financial institutions in France, after the Crédit Lyonnais and the Société Générale.

There had been some mergers with local or regional banks, and the CNEP would at times work with major private banks such as Rothschilds to guarantee securities offerings, but in general the banking industry was still relatively unconsolidated. CNEP's strategy at the start of the 20th century was to focus on the main commercial centers, leaving its national rivals to compete with regional and local banks in the smaller centers. It also maintained a dynamic overseas presence and in 1901 was instrumental in the creation of the Banque de l'Afrique Occidentale. In 1905, it purchased the Nationalbank für Deutschland's stake in Banque d'Orient, a joint venture with the National Bank of Greece. In 1907, in coordination with the French authorities, it contributed its fledgling Moroccan branches to the newly created State Bank of Morocco in which the dominant partner was the rival Banque de Paris et des Pays-Bas. In 1918, the CNEP's seat in Tunis was relocated to the prestigious address of 3, avenue Jules Ferry (now Avenue Habib Bourguiba), facing the French Protectorate Residence. New Tunisian branches opened in Bizerte (1907), Monastir (1924), Mateur (1925), and Béja (1930). The latter three, however, were closed in the mid-1930s.

Following the upheaval of World War I (1914–1918), in the period from 1919 to 1926 the leading banks in France by volume were Société Générale (32% – 36%), Crédit Lyonnais (30% – 32%), CNEP (20% – 23%) and Credit Industriel et Commercial (9% – 14%).

In May 1919 about half the CNEP employees went on strike, and the executive leadership agreed to negotiate on the condition that representatives of all employees, including those who had continued to work, should be included. With the growing power of the unions in the 1920s, the company made a series of concessions to employees, such as the introduction of a minimum wage and improved treatment of women. In 1919 CNEP had 800 employees in the accounting department alone, and in the second half of the 1920s had about 10,000 employees in total. Wages were supplemented by bonuses that were roughly linked to the bank's financial results. The benefits packages took into account seniority, and were designed to encourage loyalty to the firm. However, promotions were made strictly on the basis of merit, with no allowance for seniority.

Starting in the 1920s there was a move to improve efficiency through a more scientific organization of the work, standardization of procedures and mechanization. The first "Ellis" calculating machines were imported from the United States in 1926 with the explicit purpose of staff reduction. From then until 1937 more machinery was imported for card sorting and collation, typewriting, calculation and printing from manufacturers such as Ellis, Powers, Underwood and Burroughs, with the addition of devices made in France by Bull in the 1930s.

== Nationalization and merger (1945–1966) ==
After World War II (1939–1945) a law passed on 2 December 1945 redefined the regulatory framework governing the banking industry and decreed the nationalization of the Banque de France and the four leading French retail banks: Banque nationale pour le commerce et l'industrie (BNCI), CNEP, Crédit Lyonnais and Société Générale. In the 1950s CNEP, which traditionally had served medium-large companies in each large market, started trying to move up the value chain with its key customers. The bank's executives established closer relationships with the major enterprises through a policy of frequent contacts with their counterparts in these firms during which they discussed their banking and financing needs.

CNEP maintained the main lines of its strategy defined in the inter-war period: selective establishment of its headquarters, centralization of administrative and accounting operations. In 1963, it merged its Tunisian network into a new entity, the Banque d’Escompte et de Crédit à l’Industrie en Tunisie (BEIT), in partnership with Morgan Guaranty and the Banque industrielle de l'Afrique du Nord (BIAN), another bank that had existed since 1919. On the eve of its merger with BNCI in 1966, the CNEP had more than 100 branches in Paris and the surrounding region, and 733 in the rest of France, almost twice as many as in 1941. Outside France, it remained established in Australia, Belgium, India, the United Kingdom, and the United States.

In 1966, by decision of Finance Minister Michel Debré, the Comptoir national d'escompte de Paris merged with the Banque nationale pour le commerce et l'industrie to create the Banque nationale de Paris (BNP). Henry Bizot, president of the CNEP, was appointed president of the merged entity, and Pierre Ledoux, CEO of BNCI, became its CEO.

== Paris headquarters building ==
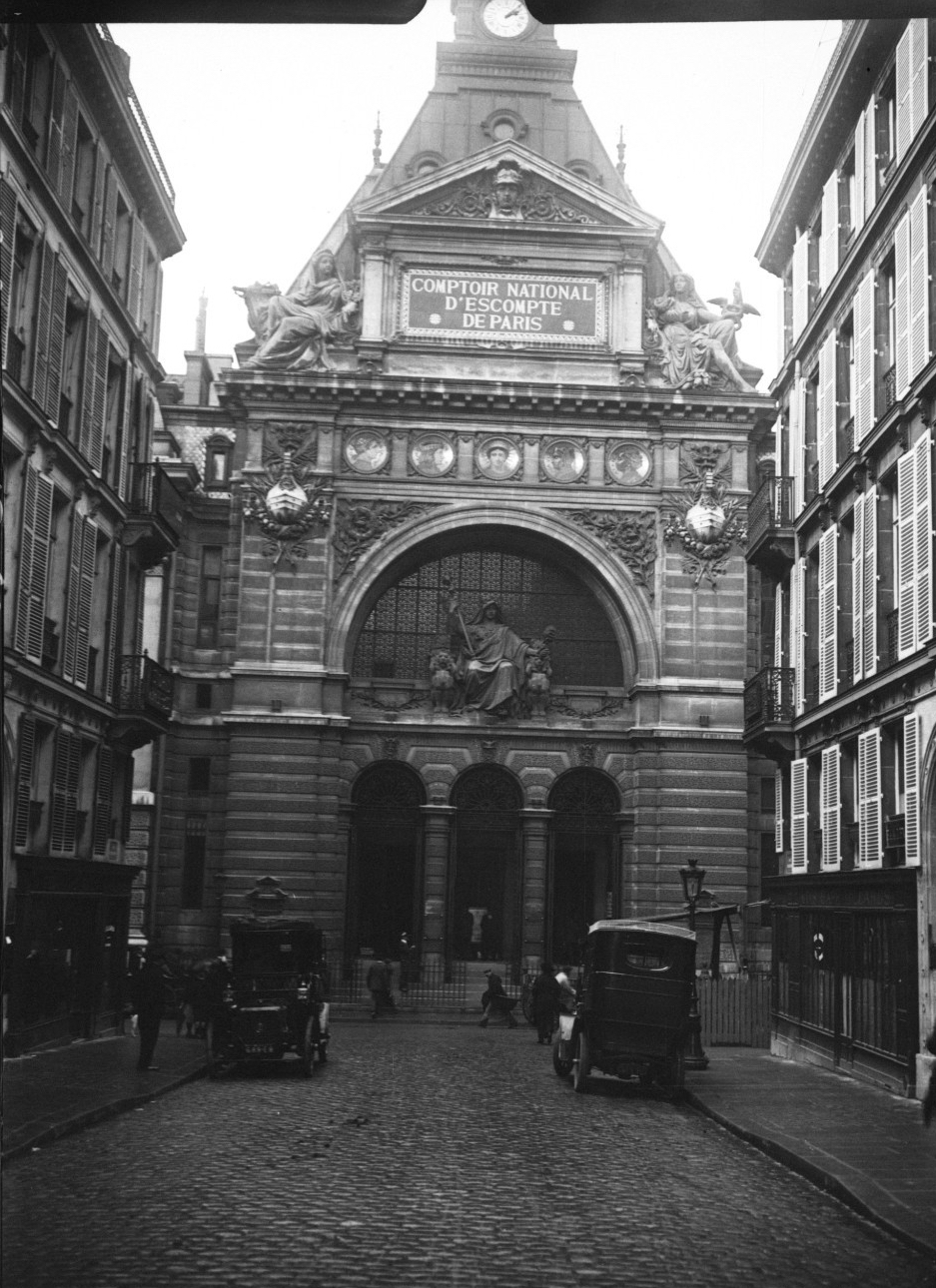
Main façade of the CNEP headquarters building in 1913

In 1852 the Comptoir moved from its temporary office to new headquarters in the hôtel Rougemont at 14, rue Bergère, at first rented. Ten years later the CEP purchased the building, and gradually acquired the surrounding land and buildings. Eventually it grew into a large complex of 3,000 square metres (32,000 sq ft) and an iconic exemplar of French bank architecture. By an act of 19 February 1991, a part of the main building was listed as a monument historique.

The main section of the new building was built between 1878 and 1883, following the bank's choice of architect Édouard Corroyer, known for having worked under Viollet-Le-Duc and led the restoration of the Mont-Saint-Michel Abbey, to design it. The CEP's annual general meeting of 30 January 1882 was held there even though it was still not finished. Corroyer took on the services of some of the best-known craftsmen of the time, including painter Charles Lameire, mosaicist Giandomenico Facchina, and sculptor Aimé Millet, the last two of which had worked on the ornamentation of the Palais Garnier opera house.

Crossing the lobby decorated in opulent style with columns and mosaics, customers reach the main hall or atrium which serves as the bank main branch, with counters for their banking transactions. The hall is surmounted by a glass roof decorated with geometric and floral motifs, which lets in the daylight. The floor is constructed of glass blocks made by glassmaker Saint-Gobain, which allow this natural overhead lighting to penetrate down to the vaults, safes and securities depository in the basement. Stained glass artist Édouard Didron created the windows, and the silverware manufacturer Christofle made the outdoor lanterns. The Comptoir d'Escompte was at first illuminated by electric lights powered by batteries, since the authorities considered that engines were noisy and unsafe.

From the hall, a monumental staircase in ornate style, decorated with mosaics depicting flowers and birds, leads up to the management offices and the board room. It was in these rooms that contracts were signed for the financing of major projects and loans in the late 19th and early 20th century. From the very outset, the building was equipped with the cutting-edge technological innovations of its era: electricity, elevator, central heating, a pneumatic tube system for sending internal mail and clocks displaying the time in major cities around the world. Corroyer's goal was to communicate the wealth and power of the organization, and in this he succeeded by the standards of the time.

Between 1900 and 1905 a second section of the headquarters was constructed under the direction of the architect François Constant-Bernard. In 1899 the CNEP bought the building of the Saint-Gobain Compagnie des Glaces et Produits Chimiques at the corner of rue Bergère and rue du Conservatoire, and completed the Bergère building on this site in 1913, a major extension along the rue du Conservatoire. A major overhaul was undertaken by the architect Anthony Emmanuel Béchu, opening on 10 June 2009 as the new headquarters of BNP Paribas Investment Partners.

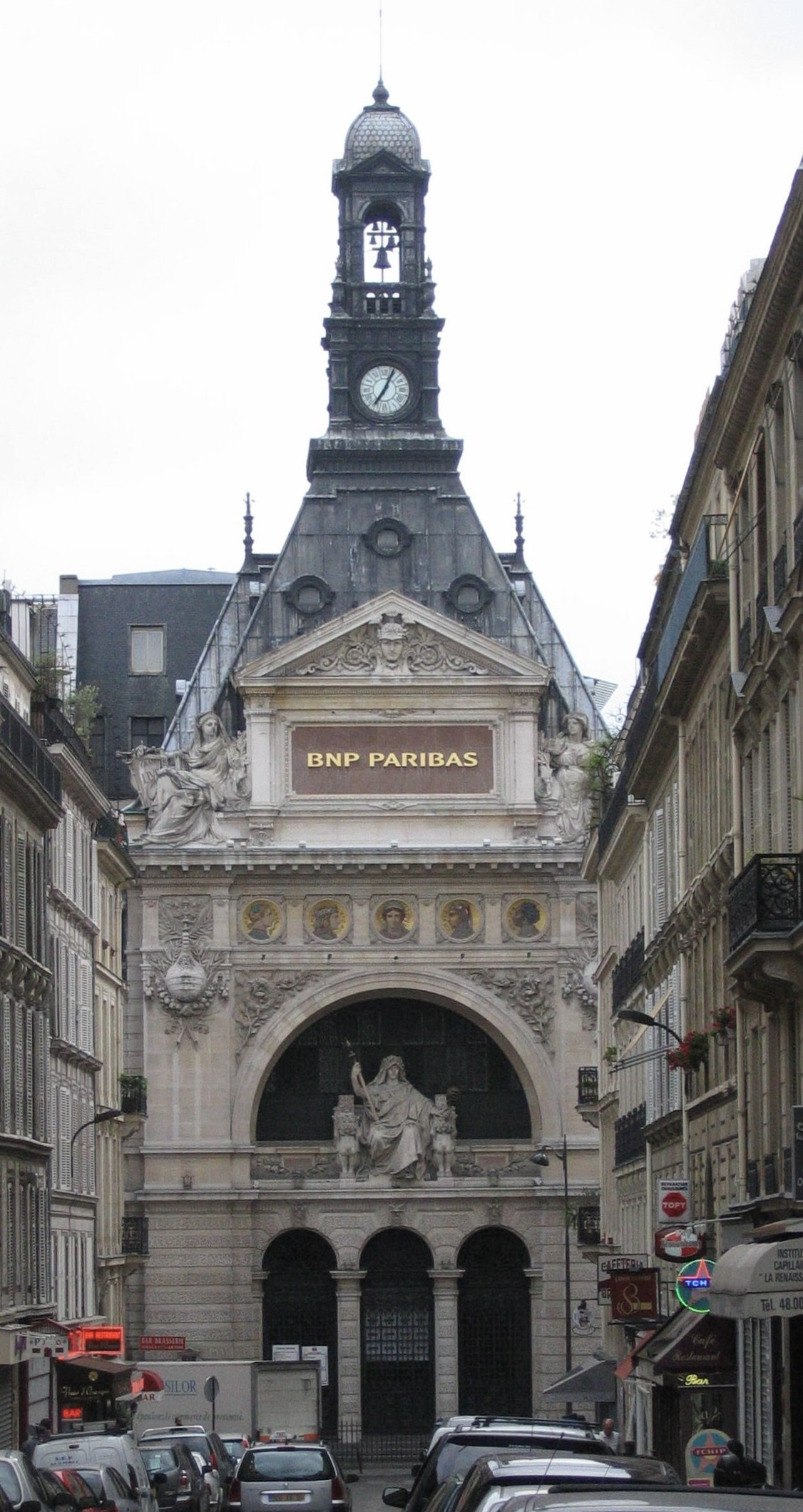
Main façade on rue Bergère at the northern end of rue Rougemont, viewed from boulevard Poissonniere

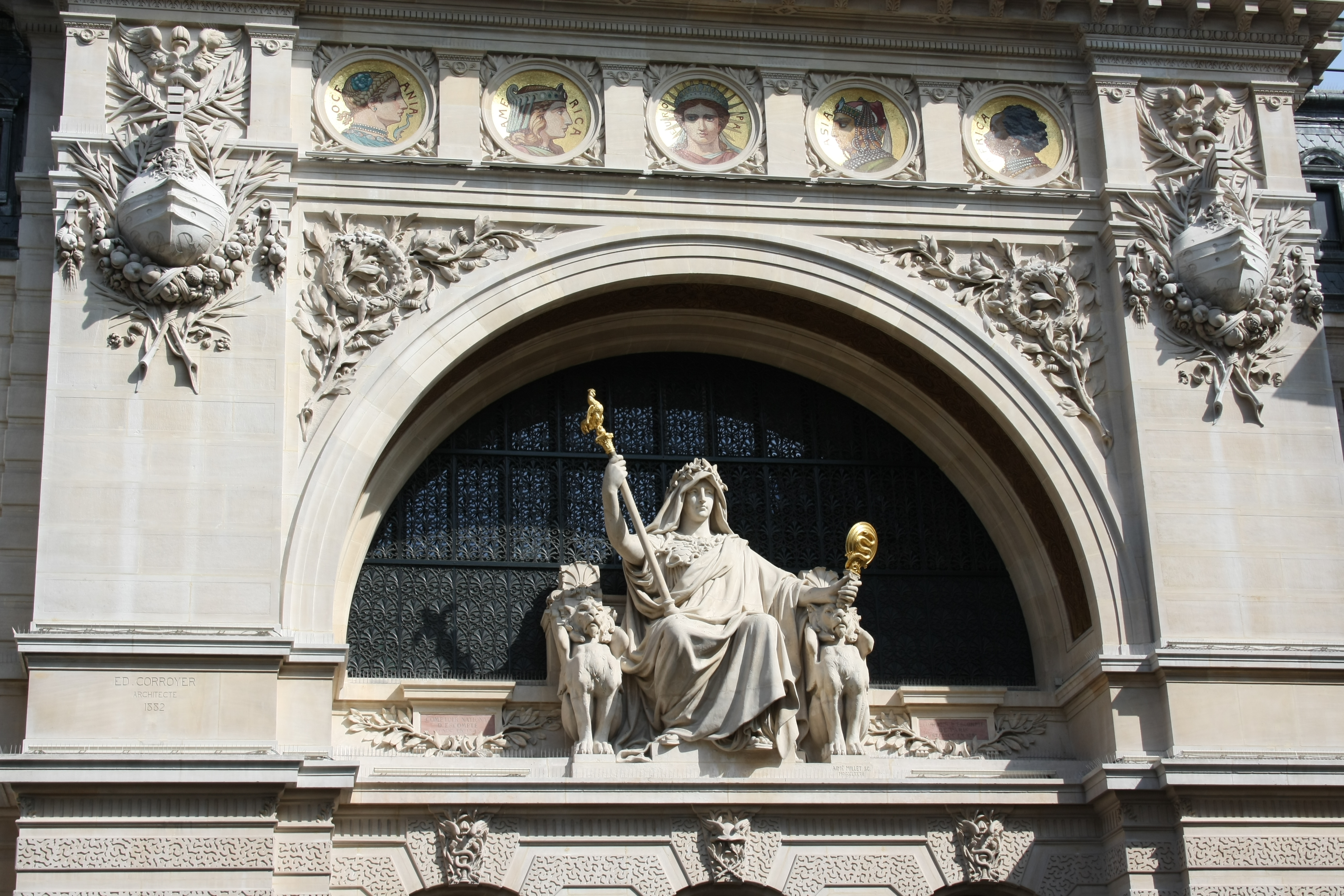
Allegory of prudence by Aimé Millet, and mosaic medallions of the five continents

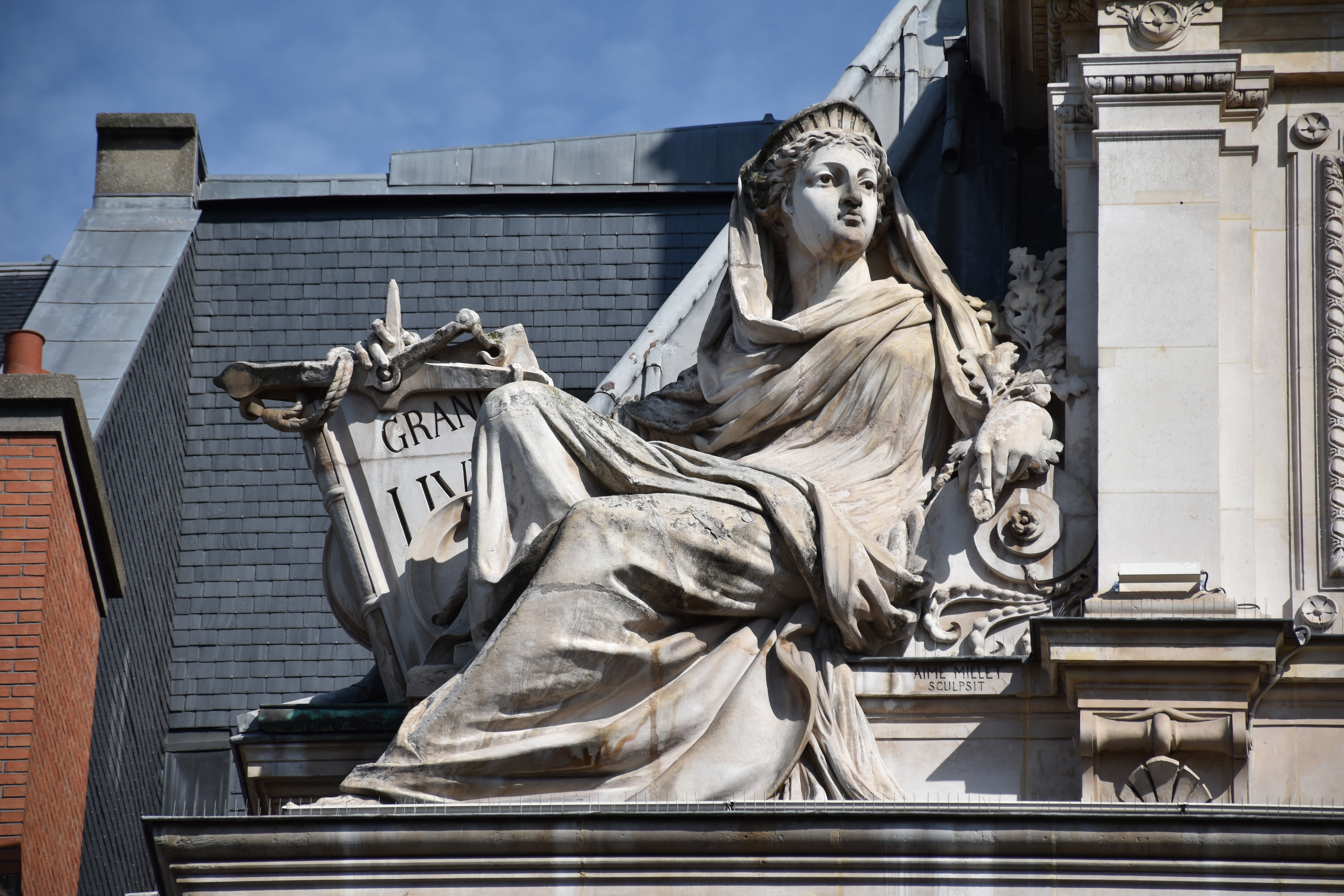
Allegory of Finance by Millet, holding a general ledger

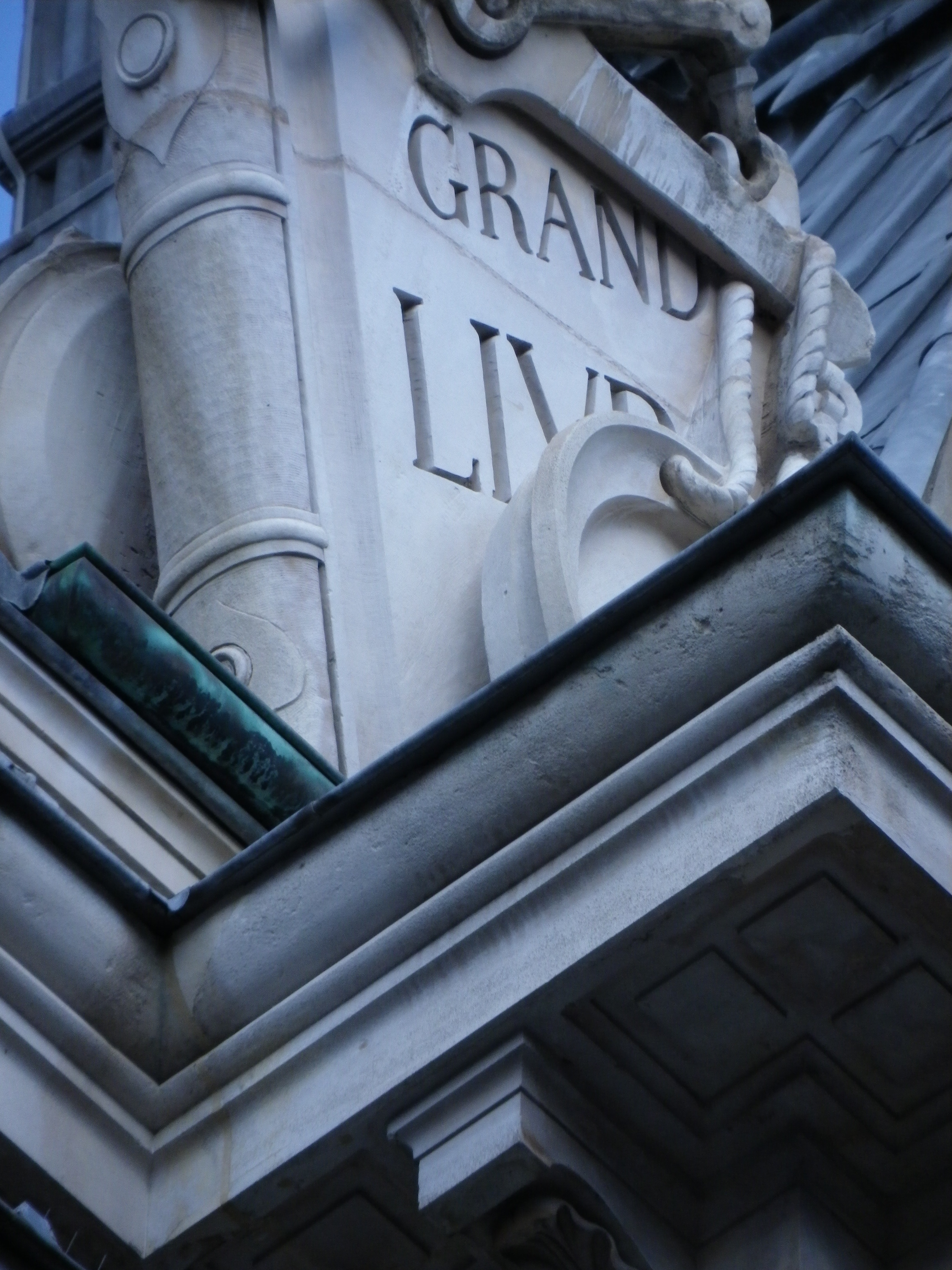
Detail of the general ledger (French: Grand Livre)

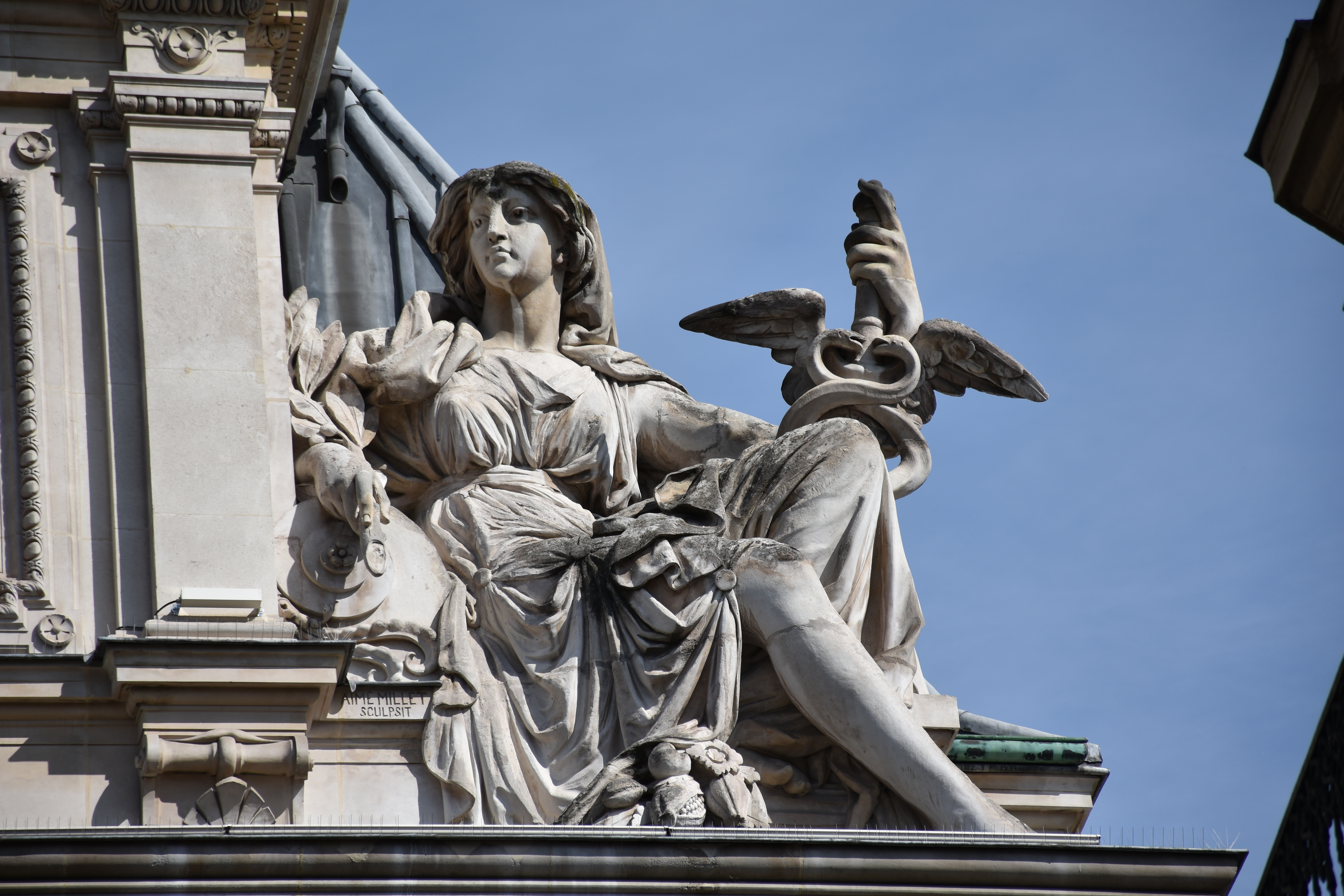
Allegory of Commerce by Millet, holding a caduceus

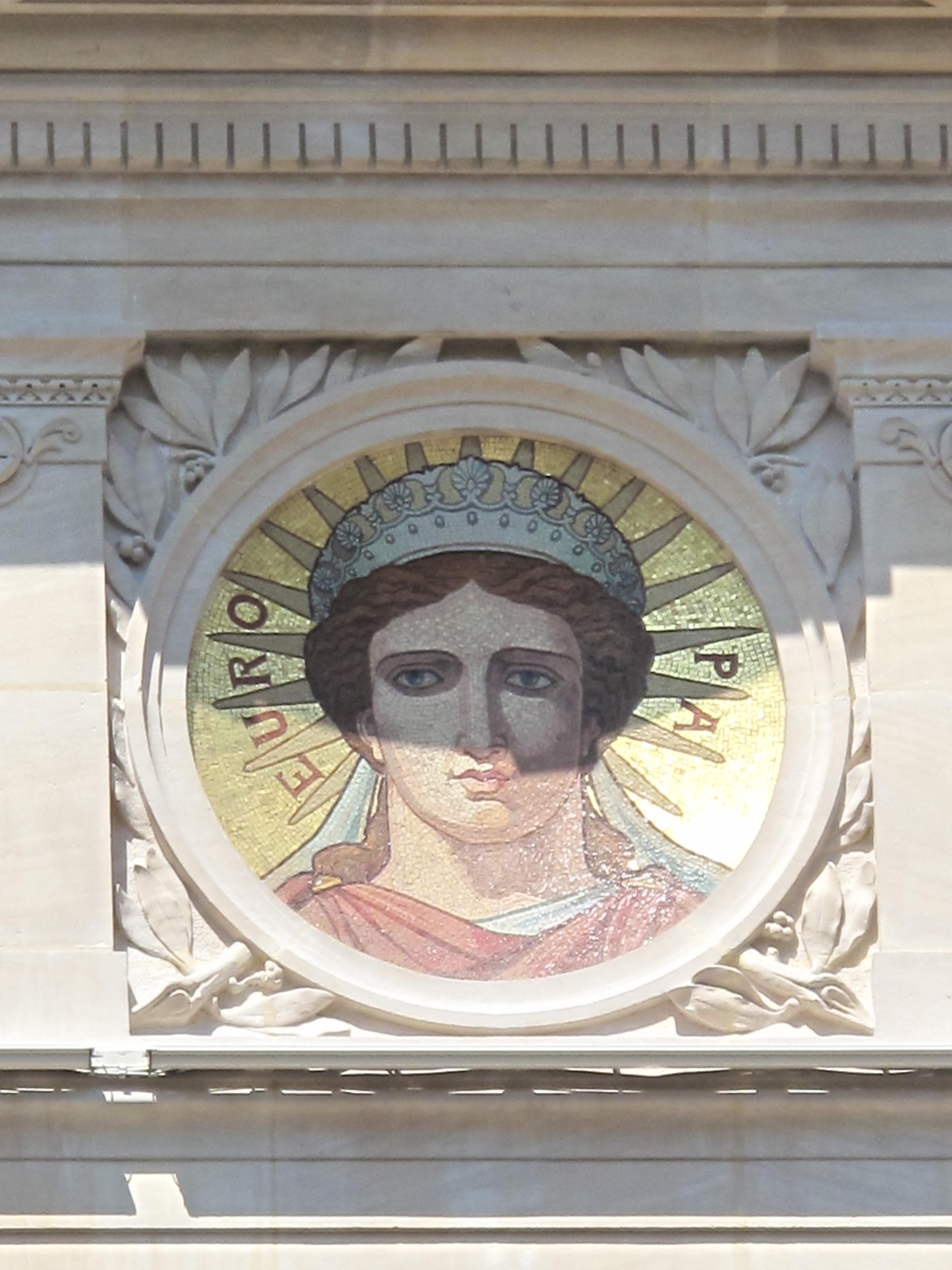
Mosaic medallion of Europe, by Charles Lemeire and Giandomenico Facchina

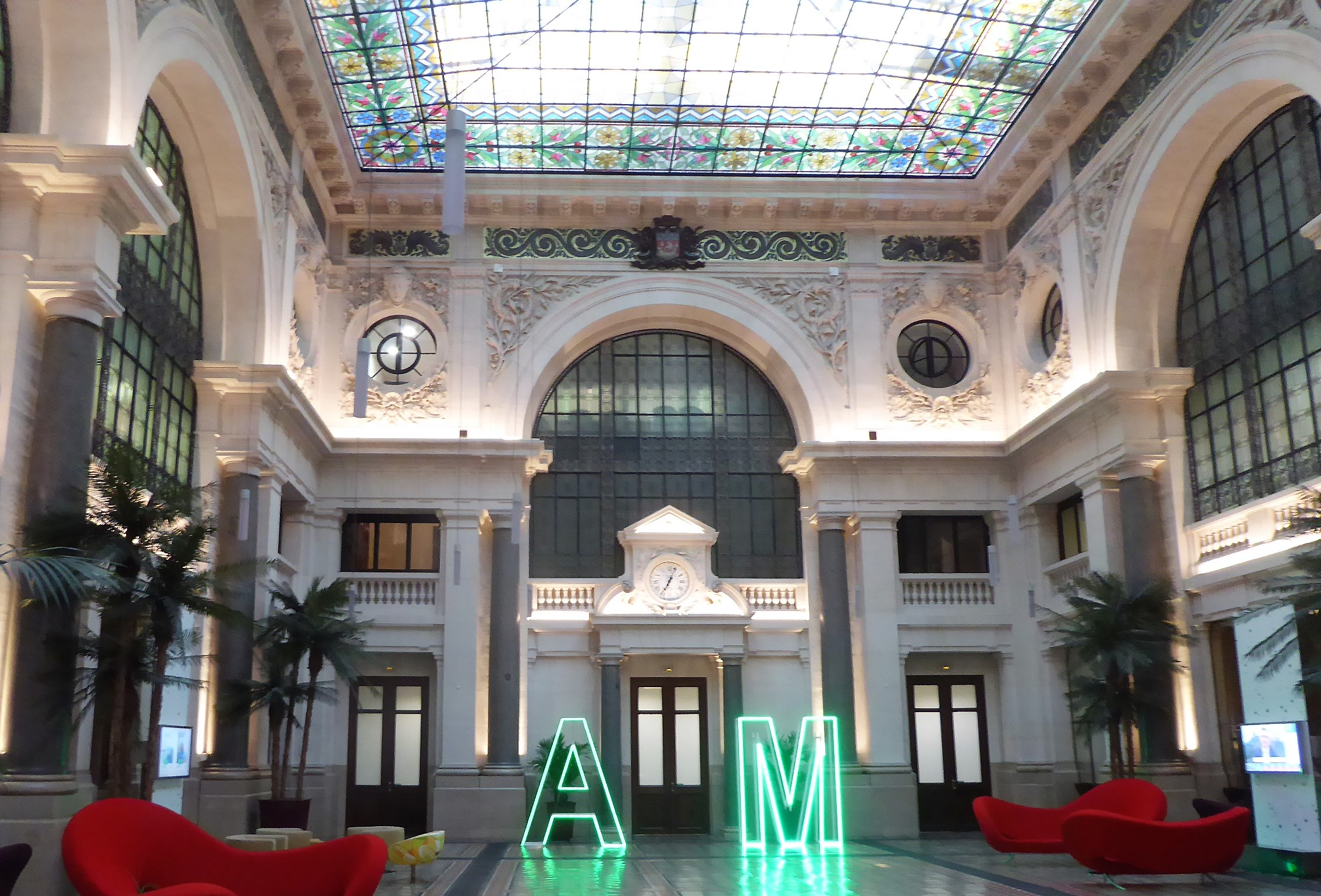
Interior main hall, with glasswork by Édouard Didron on the ceiling

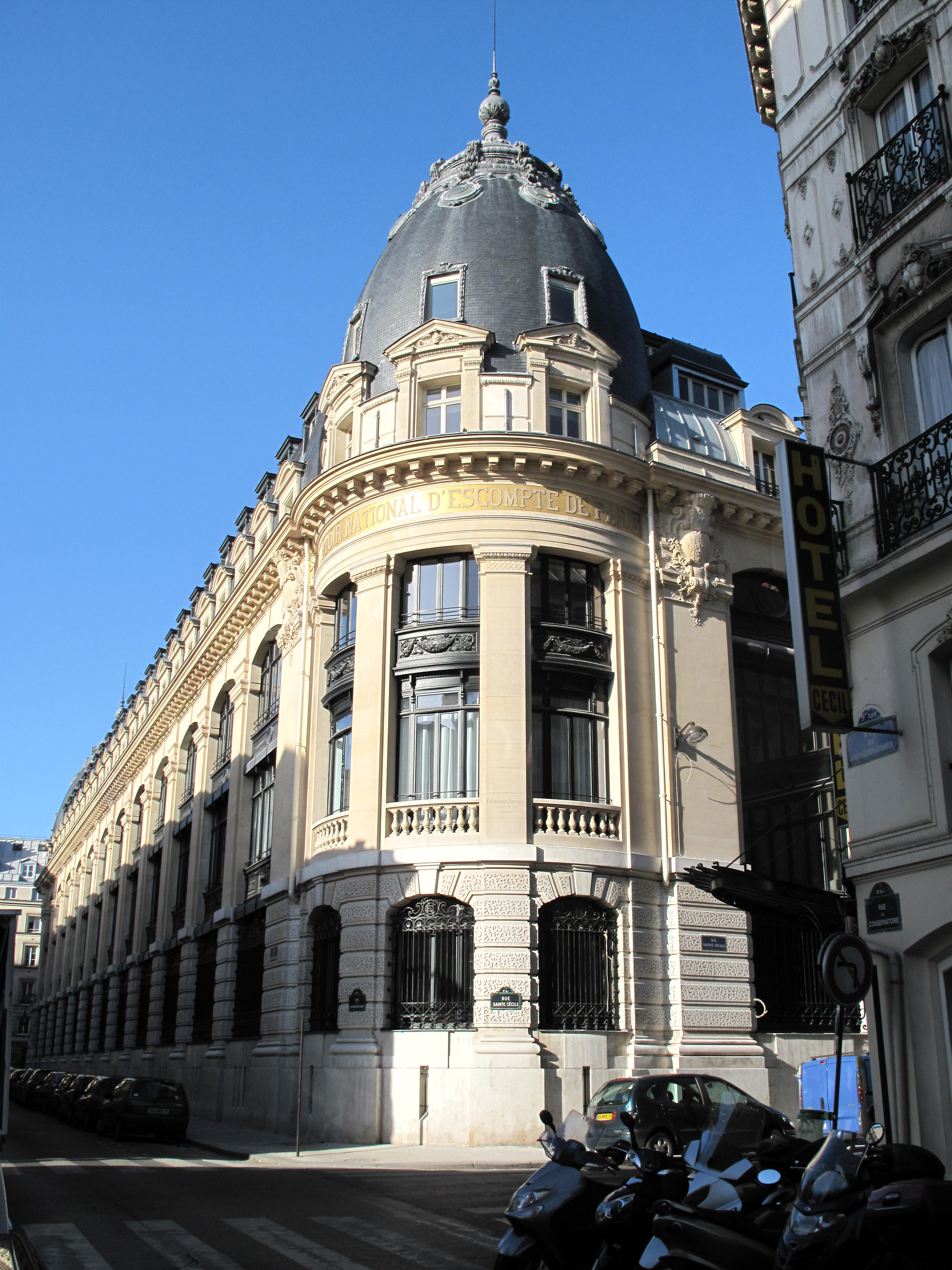
Rear façade (angle of rue du Conservatoire and rue Sainte-Cécile) with "Comptoir National d'Escompte de Paris" mosaic inscription

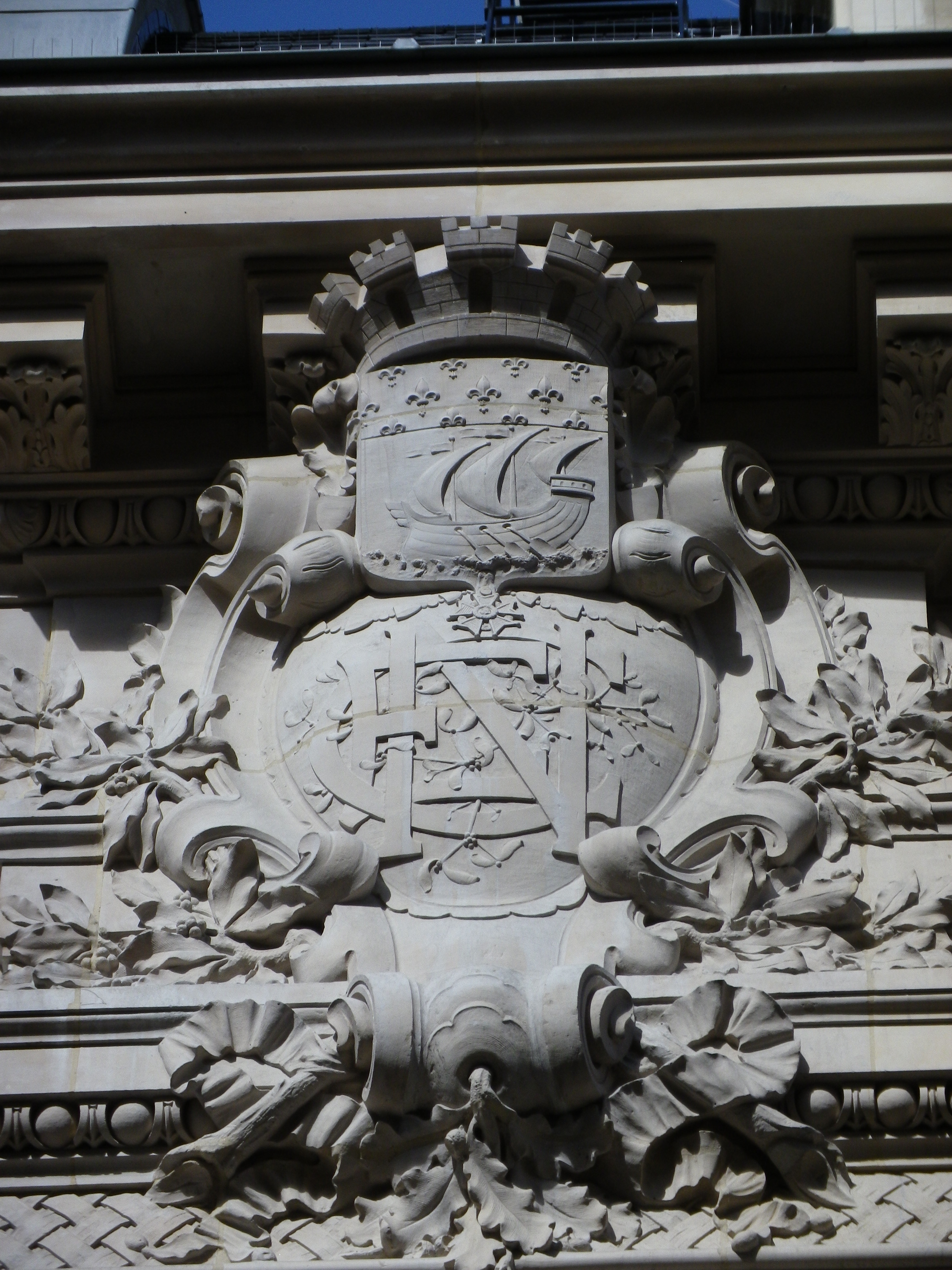
Cartouche on the rear façade displaying the bank's initials CNE under the coat of arms of Paris

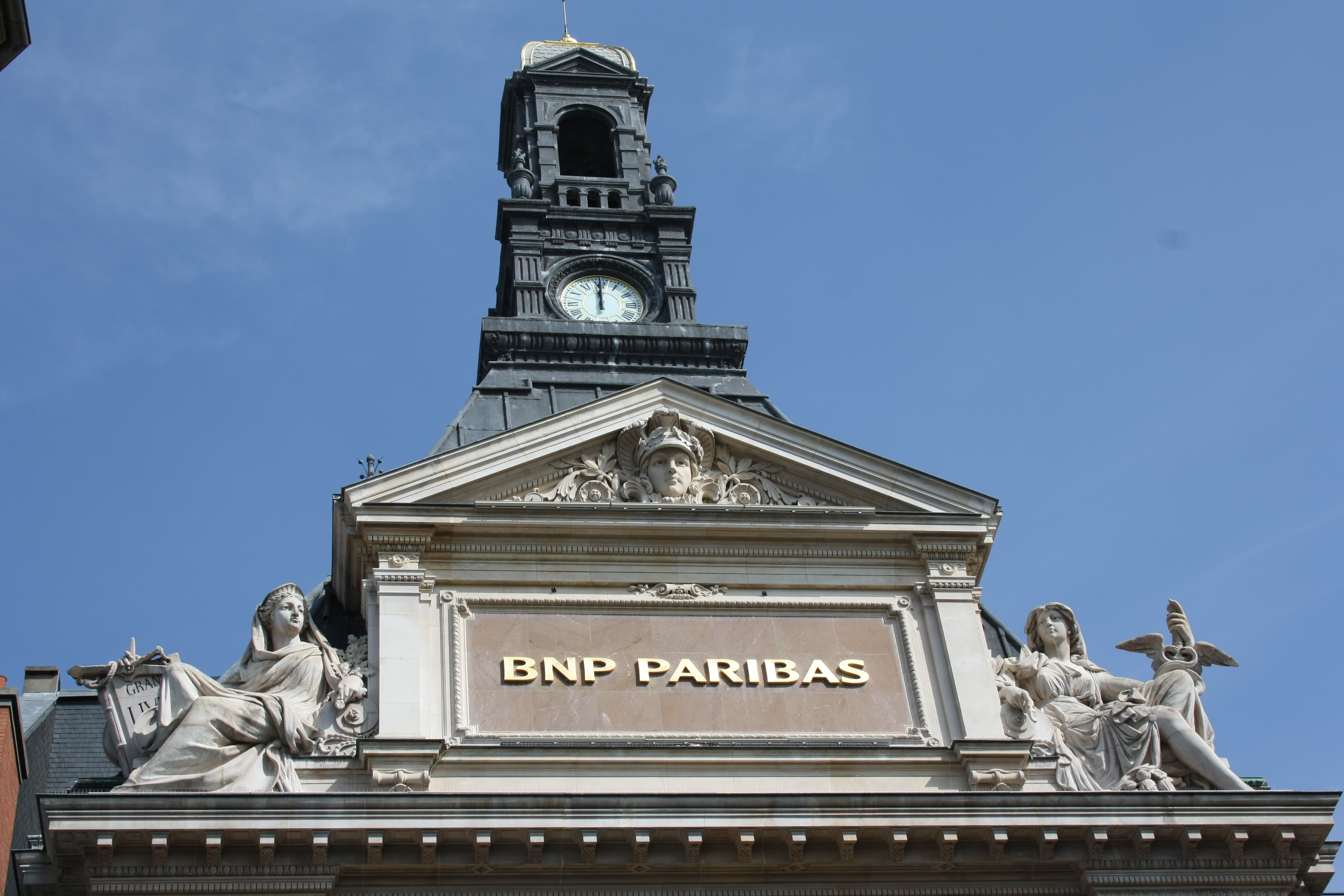
BNP Paribas brand name, placed after 2000 at the top of the main façade on rue Bergère

== See also ==
- Banque nationale pour le commerce et l'industrie, originating in the Comptoir national d'escompte de Mulhouse
- List of banks in France
