= 1982 French nationalization law =

The nationalization law of February 11, 1982 was passed during President François Mitterrand's first seven-year term and promulgated by Pierre Mauroy's Second Government.

Debate began on October 13, 1981, and a version of the bill was approved by Parliament on December 18, 1981. However, this bill was rejected by the Constitutional Council on January 16, 1982 and was never promulgated. A second bill, introduced on January 20, was passed and promulgated on February 11, 1982.

== Political process ==
The nationalization plan was part of the "Common Government Program" signed on June 27, 1972, by the Socialist Party (PS), the Communist Party, and the Radical Party of the Left. It was subsequently included in the "110 Propositions for France" put forward by Mitterrand during the 1981 French presidential election campaign.

Parliament adopted an initial law on December 18, 1981, despite its rejection by the Senate, which was controlled by the opposition. The legislation aimed to nationalize France's five leading industrial groups, thirty-nine banks, and two financial holding companies.

The right-wing opposition (RPR and UDF) did not hesitate to employ parliamentary obstructionist tactics, tabling nearly 1,400 amendments. Charles Millon was one of the bill's fiercest opponents; in 1984, he published L'Extravagante Histoire des nationalisations (The Extravagant History of Nationalizations).

Spurred by the opposition—which was campaigning for higher compensation for the companies to be nationalized—the Constitutional Council, in its decision no. 81-132 of January 16, 1982, struck down Articles 4, 6, 13-1, 16, 18, 30, and 32 of the bill. These articles concerned the valuation mechanisms used to determine compensation for the companies being nationalized; the Council ruled against them on the grounds of the inviolability of the right to property. It cited the will of the people, noting that "through the referendum of May 5, 1946, [the people] rejected a Declaration of Rights containing, in particular, a statement of principles differing from those proclaimed in 1789 in Articles 2 and 17," while conversely, "through the referendums of October 13, 1946, and September 28, 1958, [they] approved texts conferring constitutional status upon the principles and rights proclaimed in 1789."

The bill was withdrawn; a new version was subsequently adopted and promulgated on February 11, 1982, and published in the Journal officiel de la République française on February 13, 1982. For publicly traded companies, the share exchange value was set at the average stock price from October 1980 to March 1981, plus 14% to account for inflation

== Companies nationalized ==
The companies concerned received a total of 39 billion francs in compensation. The law applies to the following sectors and companies:

=== Industrial sector ===
1. Thomson
2. Saint-Gobain
3. Rhône-Poulenc
4. Pechiney-Ugine-Kuhlmann
5. Usinor
6. Sacilor (merged with Usinor in 1986)
7. Suez
8. Compagnie générale d'électricité

=== Banking sector ===
==== Motivation for the law ====
According to J.-F. Bocquillon and M. Mariage, proponents of bank nationalization present it as a solution to the following problems:

- To guarantee the repayment of loans, banks prefer lending to creditworthy individuals rather than to those in need; they lend little or nothing to the latter.
- They prioritize short-term, lucrative—so-called speculative—transactions over long-term productive investments.
- Financial intermediaries (institutions that borrow and then lend) increase the costs of financial transactions.
- The central bank's monopoly on money creation (fiat money) is threatened by competition from commercial banks, which in turn create money (scriptural money).

==== Scope ====
The law applies only to financial institutions headquartered in France that hold demand deposits or short-term deposit and credit operations, while excluding branches of foreign banks and financial institutions that hold long-term investments. Additionally, the law only applies to banks holding at least one billion French francs for persons residing in France at the beginning of 1981.

==== Institutions concernées ====
- Banking and financial groups:
  1. Banque de Bretagne;
  2. Crédit commercial de France ;
  3. Crédit industriel d'Alsace et de Lorraine (CIAL) ;
  4. Crédit industriel et commercial (CIC) ;
  5. Crédit industriel de Normandie ;
  6. Crédit industriel de l'Ouest ;
  7. Crédit du Nord ;
  8. Banque Hervet ;
  9. Rothschild (Banque) ;
  10. Banque Scalbert-Dupont ;
  11. Société bordelaise de crédit industriel et commercial ;
  12. Société centrale de banque ;
  13. Société générale alsacienne de banque (Sogenal) ;
  14. Société lyonnaise de dépôts et de crédit industriel ;
  15. Société marseillaise de crédit ;
  16. Société nancéienne de crédit industriel et Varin-Bernier ;
  17. Société séquanaise de banque ;
  18. Banque Worms ;
  19. Banque centrale des coopératives et des mutuelles ;
  20. Banque corporative du bâtiment et des travaux publics ;
  21. Banque fédérative Crédit mutuel ;
  22. Banque française de crédit coopératif ;
  23. Banque La Hénin ;
  24. Banque de l'Indochine et de Suez (future Banque Indosuez) ;
  25. Banque industrielle et mobilière privée (BIMP) ;
  26. Banque de Paris et des Pays-Bas ;
  27. Banque parisienne de crédit au commerce et à l'industrie ;
  28. Banque régionale de l'Ain ;
  29. Banque régionale de l'Ouest ;
  30. Banque de l'Union européenne ;
  31. Banque Chaix ;
  32. Crédit chimique ;
  33. Banque Laydernier ;
  34. Monod-Française de banque ;
  35. Odier Bungener Courvoisier (Banque) ;
  36. Sofinco La Hénin ;
  37. Banque Tarneaud ;
  38. Banque Vernes et commerciale de Paris ;
  39. Union de Banques à Paris.

In addition, the State acquired the remaining equity in companies it did not yet fully own, notably:

1. Banque nationale de Paris
2. Crédit lyonnais
3. Société générale

=== Financial holding companies ===
- Compagnie financière de Paris et des Pays-Bas
- Compagnie financière de Suez

== History of French state-owned enterprises ==
Prior to 1982, employment in state-owned enterprises was stable, hovering around 1.4 million employees. The nationalization law marked a major turning point: by the mid-1980s, the sector reached a historic peak of 2.4 million people, representing one in ten jobs in France. However, this trend was reversed by waves of privatization launched in 1986 by the Chirac government and subsequently in 1993 by the Balladur government, bringing the workforce of these companies down to 1.1 million by the early 2000s.

== See also ==
- Mixed economy
- Economic history of France
- Privatizations in France
- Austerity turn
