= List of banks in France =

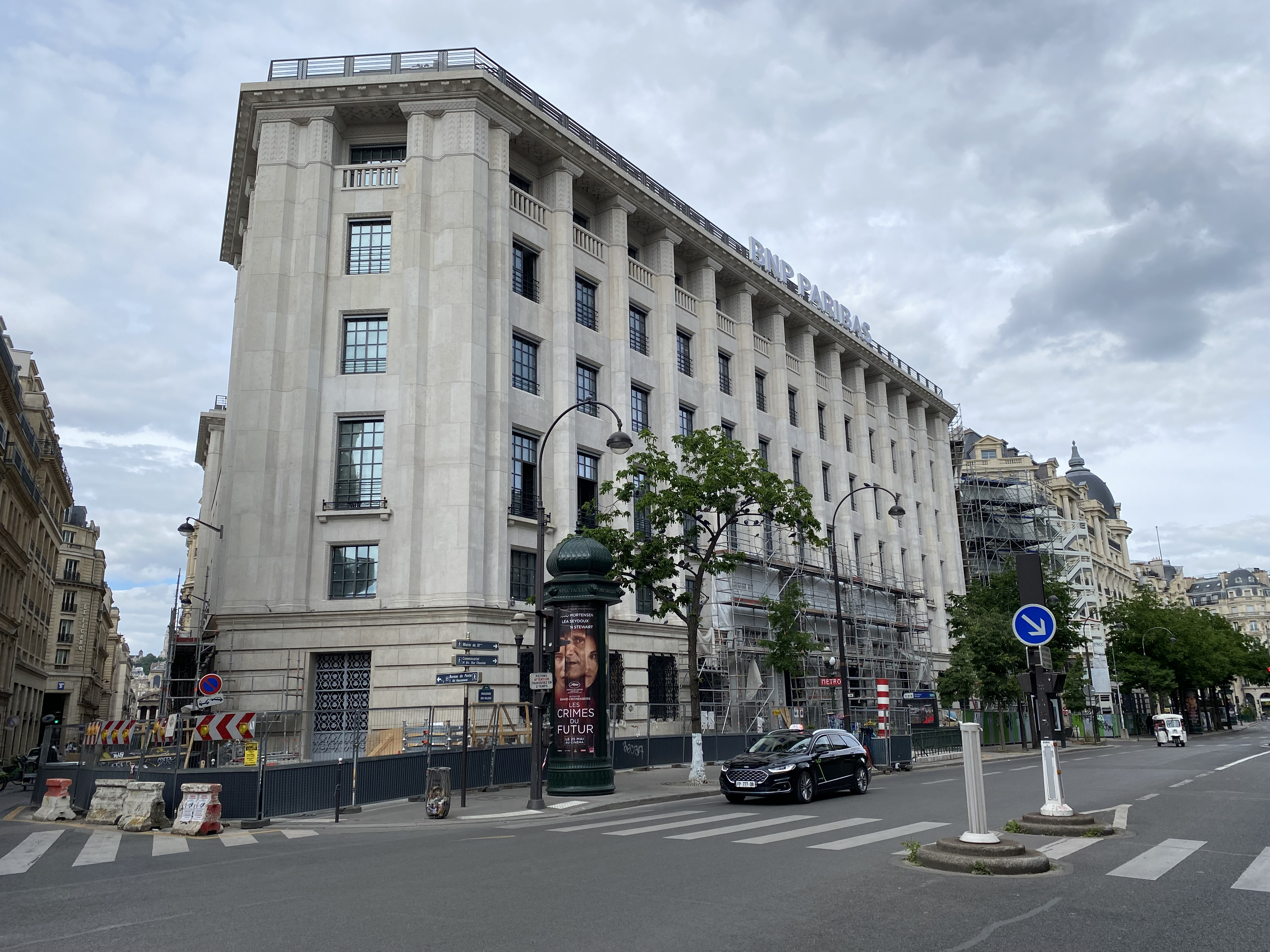
Paris head office of BNP Paribas

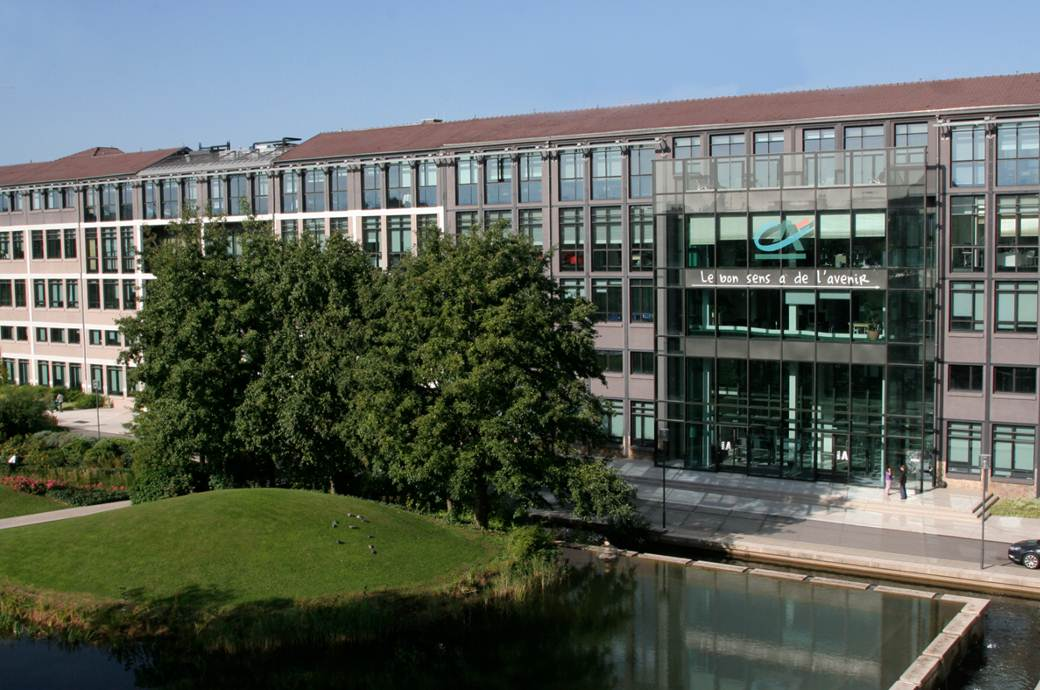
Head office of Crédit Agricole near Paris

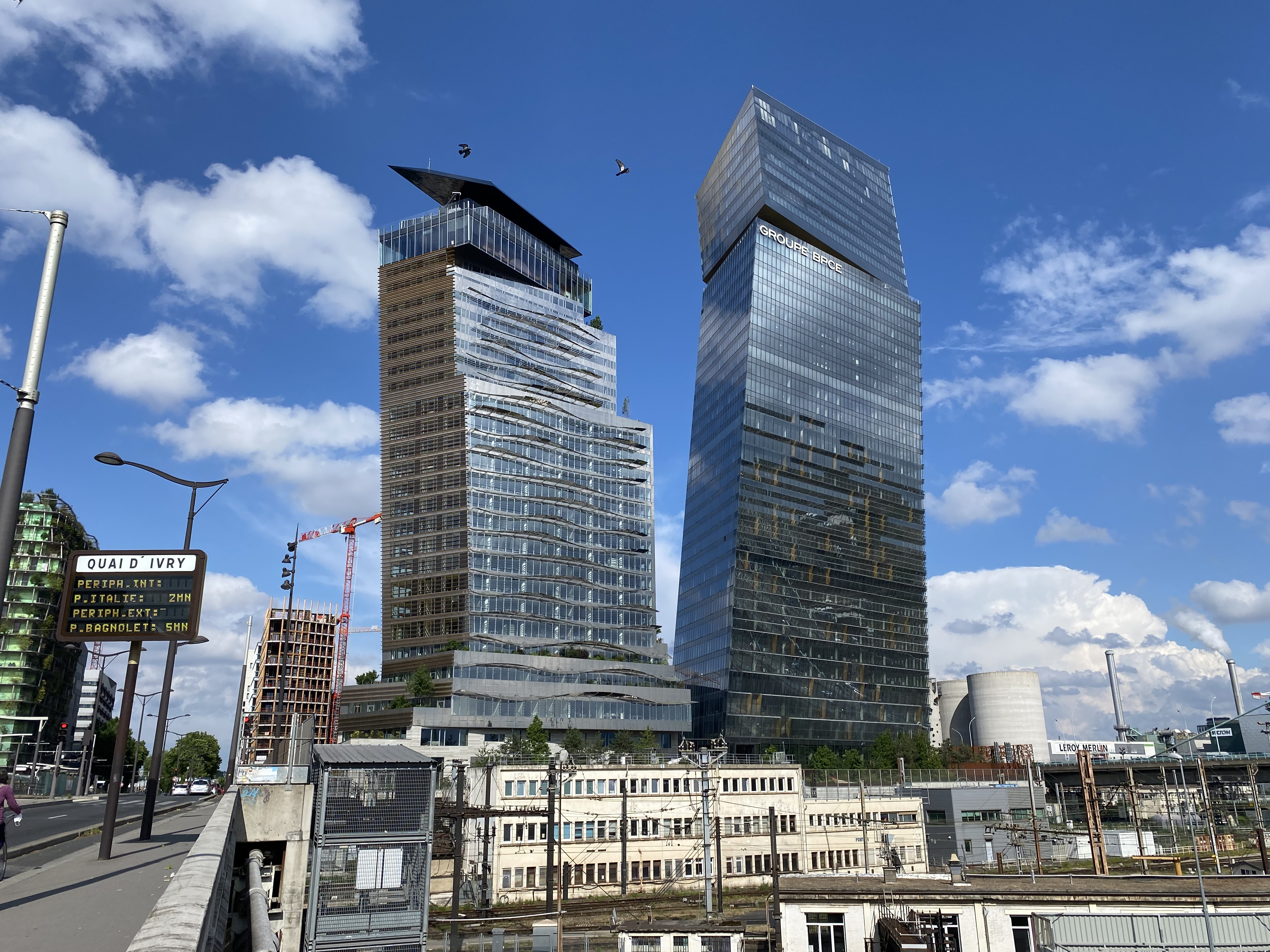
Paris head office of BPCE

Head office of Société Générale at Paris La Défense

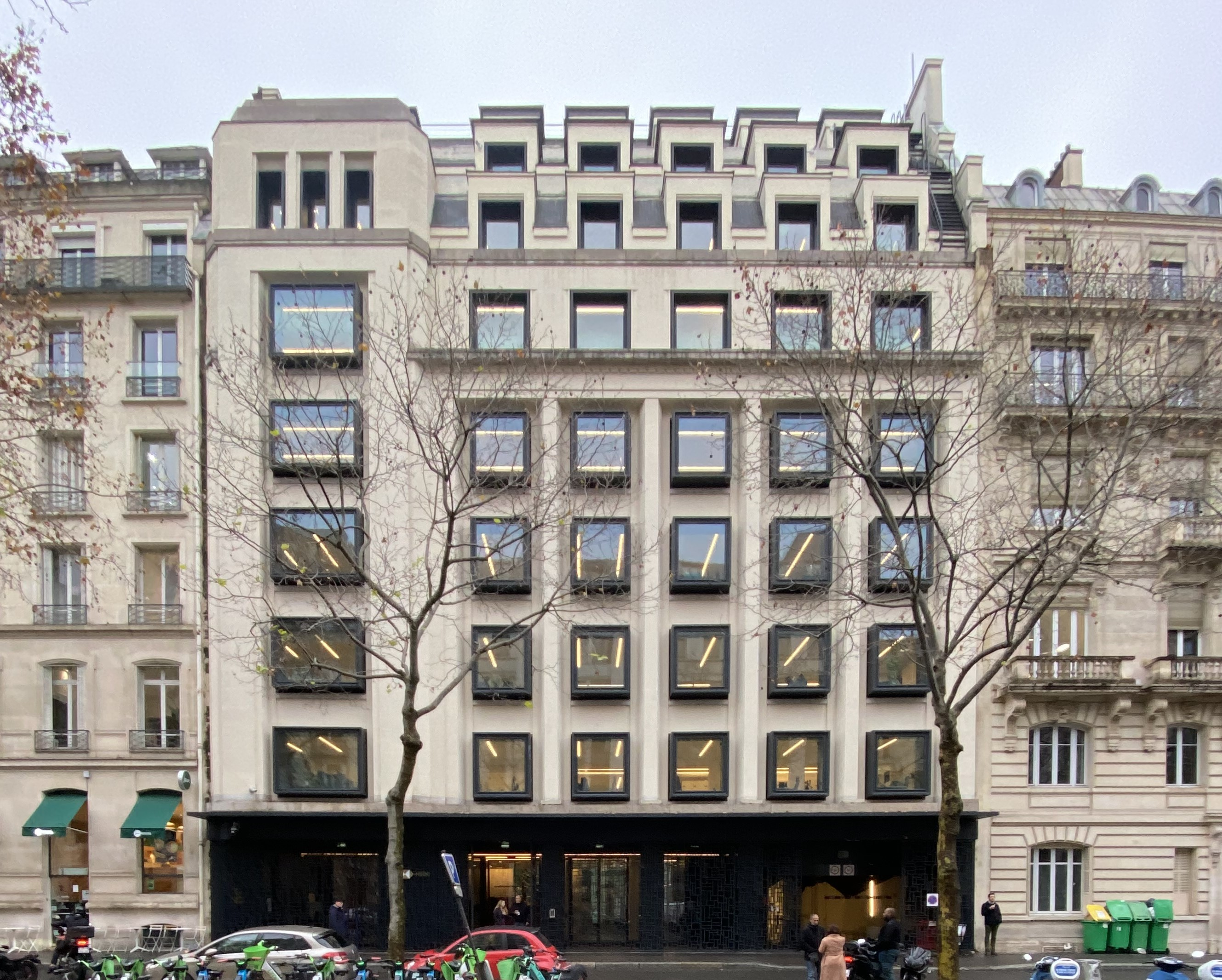
Paris head office of HSBC Continental Europe

The following list of banks in France is to be understood within the framework of the European single market and European banking union, which means that France's banking system is more open to cross-border banking operations than peers outside of the EU.

== Policy framework ==
European banking supervision distinguishes between significant institutions (SIs) and less significant institutions (LSIs), with SI/LSI designations updated regularly by the European Central Bank (ECB). Significant institutions are directly supervised by the ECB using joint supervisory teams that involve the national competent authorities (NCAs) of individual participating countries. Less significant institutions are supervised by the relevant NCA on a day-to-day basis, under the supervisory oversight of the ECB. In France's case, the NCA is the French Prudential Supervision and Resolution Authority, hosted within the Bank of France and known by the acronym ACPR.

== Significant institutions ==
As of 1 September 2025, the ECB had the following 12 banking groups based in France in its list of significant institutions.

- BNP Paribas
- BofA Securities Europe, one of two intermediate parent undertakings of Bank of America in the EU
- BPCE
- Bpifrance
- Confédération Nationale du Crédit Mutuel
- Crédit Agricole
- HSBC Continental Europe, intermediate parent undertaking of HSBC in the EU
- La Banque Postale
- Promontoria 19 Coöperatie UA, a Dutch holding that is the consolidating entity for CCF
- RCI Banque
- Sfil
- Société Générale

Of these, BNP Paribas, BPCE, Crédit Agricole, and Société Générale have been consistently designated as Global systemically important banks (G-SIBs) by the Financial Stability Board, including in the update of November 2025. A study published in 2024 assessed that the bank with most aggregate assets in France (as opposed to total consolidated assets, as of end-2023) was Crédit Agricole at nearly €2 trillion, followed by BNP Paribas (€1.5 trillion), BPCE (€1.4 trillion), Société Générale and Crédit Mutuel (€1 trillion each), and La Banque Postale (€738 billion). France is also home to subsidiaries of other euro-area significant institutions namely Crelan, Monte dei Paschi di Siena, and Santander.

== Less significant institutions ==
As of 1 September 2025, the ECB's list of supervised institutions included 93 French LSIs.

=== High-impact LSIs ===
Of these, five were designated by the ECB as "high-impact" on the basis of several criteria including size:

- Axa Banque, subsidiary of Axa
- Banque Centrale de Compensation, also known as LCH SA and part of London Stock Exchange Group.
- Caisse de Refinancement de l'Habitat (CRH)
- Financière IDAT, the parent holding entity of Oddo BHF
- Rothschild & Co, a financial holding company

Of these, LCH SA met the criteria for SI designation, but has been classified by the ECB as a LSI by special derogation together with a handful of other financial market infrastructures.

=== Municipal pawnbrokers ===
Again based on the same ECB lists, 17 French LSIs were specialized municipal pawnbrokers (French: Crédit Municipal, owned by the respective city governments):

- Caisse De Credit Municipal d'Avignon
- Caisse de Credit Municipal de Bordeaux
- Caisse de Credit Municipal de Boulogne-Sur-Mer
- Caisse de Credit Municipal de Dijon
- Caisse de Credit Municipal de Lille
- Caisse de Credit Municipal de Lyon
- Caisse de Credit Municipal de Marseille
- Caisse de Credit Municipal de Nancy
- Caisse de Credit Municipal de Nantes
- Caisse de Credit Municipal de Nice
- Caisse de Credit Municipal de Nimes
- Credit Municipal de Paris
- Caisse de Credit Municipal de Reims
- Caisse de Credit Municipal de Roubaix
- Caisse de Credit Municipal de Strasbourg
- Caisse de Credit Municipal de Toulon
- Caisse de Credit Municipal de Toulouse

=== Other domestic LSIs ===
The 42 other domestic French LSI were:

- Agence France Locale - Société Territoriale, holding entity of Agence France Locale
  - Agence France Locale
- Allianz Banque, subsidiary of Allianz
- Axa Banque Financement, subsidiary of Axa Banque
  - Axa Home Loan SFH, subsidiary of Axa Banque
- Banque Chabrieres
- Banque Delubac & Cie
- Banque d'Escompte
- Banque Fiducial
- Banque Francaise Mutualiste
- Banque Hottinguer
- Bakia SCA, holding entity of Banque Michel Inchauspé
  - Banque Michel Inchauspé (Bami)
- Banque Pouyanne
- Compagnie Financière Richelieu, holding entity of Banque Richelieu
  - Banque Richelieu France SA
- Enyo SA, owner of Banque Saint Olive
  - Banque Saint Olive
- Carrefour Banque, subsidiary of Carrefour
- Crédit Immobilier de France Développement, holding of state-owned CIF Group
  - Caisse Centrale du Credit Immobilier de France-3CIF
  - CIF Euromortgage
- Epargne Credit Des Militaires (ECM)
- Gresham Banque, subsidiary of Groupe Apicil
- IC Financial Services, subsidiary of Iveco
- Institut pour le Financement du Cinéma et des Industries Culturelles (IFCIC)
- Memo Bank SA, an online bank backed by Xavier Niel
- Compagnie Financière Holding Mixte Milléis, holding entity of Milleis Banque
  - Milleis Banque Privée
  - Groupe Cholet Dupont, owned by Milléis
  - Cholet Dupont Oudart, part of Groupe Cholet Dupont
- Mobilis banque, affiliate of Association Familiale Mulliez
- Oddo BHF, subsidiary of Financière IDAT
- Compagnie Financière d'Orange Bank, subsidiary of Orange Group
  - Orange Bank, subsidiary of C. F. d'Orange Bank
- Rothschild Martin Maurel, subsidiary of Rothschild & Co
- Société Auxiliaire d'Etudes et d'Investissements Mobiliers (INVESTIMO)
- Société Financière de la Nef
- Socram Banque, subsidiary of Macif
- Sofax Banque, subsidiary of TotalEnergies
- Stellantis Financial Services Europe, subsidiary of Stellantis
- Younited

=== Non-euro-area-controlled LSIs ===
Based on the same ECB list, 29 French LSIs (other than LCH SA) were affiliates of financial groups based outside the euro area, among which 26 subsidiaries and 3 branches of banks based in the European Economic Area (EEA) but outside of the euro area:

- (Bahrain) Al Khaliji France, affiliate of Khaleeji Commercial Bank
- (Bahrain) Bank ABC
- (Morocco) Attijariwafa Euro Finances, subsidiary of Attijariwafa Bank
  - Attijariwafa Bank Europe, subsidiary of Attijariwafa Euro Finances
- (Lebanon) Bank Audi France, subsidiary of Bank Audi
- (Lebanon) Banque Banorient France, subsidiary of BLOM Bank
- (Algeria) (Libya) Banque BIA, joint venture of Banque Extérieure d'Algérie and Libyan Foreign Bank
- (Switzerland) Banque Cantonale de Genève (France) SA, subsidiary of Banque Cantonale de Genève
- (Morocco) Chaabi Bank, subsidiary of BCP Group
- (Japan) Banque Nomura France, subsidiary of Nomura Securities
- (Lebanon) Banque SBA, subsidiary of Banque Libano-Française
- (Algeria) BEA International SA, subsidiary of Banque Extérieure d'Algérie
- (Gabon) BGFI Bank Europe, subsidiary of BGFIBank Group
- (Morocco) BOA France, subsidiary of Bank of Africa
- (Togo) EBI SA, subsidiary of Ecobank Group
- (Switzerland) Edmond de Rothschild (France), subsidiary of Edmond de Rothschild Group
- (Jordan) Europe Arab bank SA, subsidiary of Arab Bank
- (Lebanon) Fransabank France SA, subsidiary of Fransabank
- (United States) GE SCF, subsidiary of GE Aerospace
- (Sweden) French branch of Klarna Bank AB
- (United States) Compagnie Financiere Lazard Frères, subsidiary of Lazard
  - Lazard Frères Banque, subsidiary of C. F. Lazard Frères
- (Sweden) Loomis FX Gold and Services, subsidiary of Loomis
- National Australia Bank Europe SA, subsidiary of National Australia Bank
- National Bank of Kuwait France SA, subsidiary of National Bank of Kuwait
- (Denmark) French branch of Saxo Bank A/S
- (Switzerland) Swisslife Banque Privée, subsidiary of Swiss Life
- (Sweden) French branch of Toyota Material Handling Commercial Finance AB, Swedish subsidiary of Toyota
- (Tunisia) Tunisian Foreign Bank, subsidiary of Société Tunisienne de Banque

== Third-country branches ==
As of 13 October 2025, the following banking groups established outside the EEA had branches in France ("third-country branches" in EU parlance):

- (Nigeria) Access Holdings
- Australia and New Zealand Banking Group
- (Morocco) Bank of Africa
- Bank of China
- Bank of India
- Bank Melli Iran
- Bank Saderat Iran
- (Iran) Bank Sepah
- (Iran) Bank Tejarat
- (Egypt) Banque Misr
- (United Kingdom) Barclays
- Export–Import Bank of China
- (United States) FCE Bank
- (United Arab Emirates) First Abu Dhabi Bank
- (Korea) KEB Hana
- (United States) JPMorgan Chase
- (Taiwan) Mega International Commercial Bank
- (Japan) Mitsubishi UFJ Financial Group
- (Japan) Mizuho Financial Group
- Qatar National Bank
- Royal Bank of Canada
- (Japan) Sumitomo Mitsui Financial Group

== Other institutions ==
The Bank of France, Agence Française de Développement, and Caisse des Dépôts et Consignations, all based in Paris, are public credit institutions that do not hold a banking license under EU law.

== Defunct banks ==
Numerous former French banks, defined as having been headquartered in the present-day territory of France, are documented on Wikipedia. They are listed below in chronological order of establishment, divided into three categories.

=== Banks of issue in Metropolitan France ===
The Bank of France, created in 1800, secured its monopoly of bank issuance on the whole territory of Metropolitan France in 1848, which was only briefly contested in the aftermath of the annexation of Savoy in the early 1860s.

- John Law's Bank (1716-1723)
- Caisse d'Escompte (1776-1793)
- Caisse de l'Extraordinaire (1789-1793)
- Caisse des Comptes Courants (1796-1800)
- Caisse d'Escompte du Commerce (1797-1803)
- Caisse de Garantie et d'Amortissement (1800-1816)
- Banques départementales (several banks, 1817-1848)
- Bank of Savoy (issuing in France 1860-1865)

=== Colonial and overseas banks ===
Several colonial and overseas banks had most of their operations outside of Metropolitan France but were nevertheless based there, generally in Paris, for at least part of their existence. For example, the Banque de l'Algérie was originally headquartered in Algiers, but relocated its head office to Paris in 1900. The Ottoman Bank had dual headquarters in London and Paris.

- Banque de l'Algérie (1851-1963)
- Banque du Sénégal / BAO / BIAO (1853-1991)
- Banque de la Guadeloupe (1853-1967)
- Banque de la Martinique (1853-1967)
- Banque de la Réunion (1853-2016)
- Banque de la Guyane (1855-1964)
- Crédit Foncier Colonial (1860-1955)
- Ottoman Bank (1863-1996)
- Banque Franco-Égyptienne (1870-1889)
- Banque de l'Indochine (1875-1975)
- Compagnie Algérienne (1877-1960)
- Crédit Foncier d'Algérie et de Tunisie (1880-1997)
- Crédit Foncier Égyptien (1880-1999)
- National Bank of Haiti (1881-1910)
- Banque des Îles Saint-Pierre-et-Miquelon (1889-2016)
- Banque Française d'Afrique du Sud (1895-1901)
- Banque Hypothécaire Franco-Argentine (1905-1970)
- State Bank of Morocco (1907-1960)
- Banque Franco-Serbe (1910-1945)
- Sudameris (1910-2003)
- Banque Franco-Japonaise (1912-1945)
- Banque Industrielle de Chine (1913-1921)
- Banque de Syrie et du Liban (1919-2012)
- Société Financière Française et Coloniale (1920-1998)
- Crédit Martiniquais (1922-1999)
- Crédit Foncier de l'Indochine (1923-1994)
- Banque Franco-Chinoise (1922-1964)
- Caisse Centrale de la France Libre, then CCFOM / CCEE (1941-1998)
- Institut d'Émission de l'Afrique Occidentale Française et du Togo (1955-1959)
- Institut d'Émission de l'Afrique Équatoriale Française et du Cameroun (1955-1959)
- Banque Internationale pour le Commerce et l'Industrie (1962-2023)

=== Other banks ===
- Cahorsins (13th-14th centuries)
- Caisse des Emprunts (1674-1683, 1702-1714)
- Banque Mallet (1713-1966)
- Banque Gouin (1714-1958)
- Banque Girardot (c. 1737-1793)
- Banque Courtois (1760-2023)
- Banque Adam (1784-1930)
- Banque Monneron (1791-1792)
- Banque Territoriale (1799-1803)
- Comptoir Commercial (1800-1813)
- Banque Seillière-Demachy (1807-1999)
- Banque Tarneaud (1809-2023)
- Banque Rothschild (1817-1991)
- Banque Guilhot (1820-1976)
- Defoe Fournier & Cie. (1824-2016)
- Banque Joire (1826-1999)
- Société Commanditaire du Commerce et de l'Industrie (1827-1836)
- Banque Veuve Morin-Pons (1829-1996)
- Banque Hervet (1830-2008)
- Banque Vernes (1830-1989)
- Banque Stern (1835-1985)
- Piganeau et fils (1835-1899)
- Banque de Baecque Beau (1837-2008)
- Caisse Générale du Commerce et de l'Industrie (1837-1848)
- Banque Gil (1846-1896)
- Banque Scalbert-Dupont (1846-2006)
- Comptoir National d'Escompte de Paris (1848-1966)
- Comptoir d'Escompte de Mulhouse (1848-1930)
- Comptoir National d'Escompte de Rouen (1848-1935)
- Crédit du Nord (1848-2023)
- Caisse des Actions Réunies (1850-1853)
- Crédit Mobilier (1852-1932)
- Crédit Foncier de France (1852-2019)
- Caisse Générale des Actionnaires (1856-1862)
- Crédit Lyonnais (1863-2005)
- Société des Dépôts et Comptes Courants (1863-1891)
- Caisse de Crédit de Nice (1865-1917)
- Société Marseillaise de Crédit (1865-2023)
- Banque Internationale de Paris (1869-1872)
- Banque d'Alsace et de Lorraine (1871-1931)
- Banque de Mulhouse (1871-1929)
- Banque de Paris et des Pays-Bas (1872-2000)
- Banque de Strasbourg (1873-1940)
- Banque Pelletier (1874-2011)
- Union Générale (1875-1882)
- Crédit de France (1876-1882)
- Société Générale Alsacienne de Banque (1881-2001)
- Banque Kolb (1890-2023)
- Banque Laydernier (1891-2023)
- Banque Suisse et Française (1894-1917)
- Banque Française pour le Commerce et l'Industrie (1901-1922)
- Banque de l'Union Parisienne (1904-1973)
- Banque Louis-Dreyfus (1905-1989)
- Société Centrale des Banques de Province (1905-1934)
- Banque des Pays du Nord (1911-1990)
- Banque Nationale de Crédit (1913-1932)
- Crédit National (1919-1996)
- Banque Franco-Polonaise (1920-1963)
- Banque Commerciale pour l'Europe du Nord – Eurobank (1921-2005)
- Union des Mines (1923-1966)
- Banque Chaix (1924-2016)
- Banque Worms (1928-2004)
- Crédit Industriel d'Alsace et de Lorraine (1931-2007)
- Banque Nationale pour le Commerce et l'Industrie (1932-1966)
- Union de Banques à Paris (1935-2005)
- Banque Française du Commerce Extérieur (1946-1996)
- Compagnie Bancaire (1946-1998)
- Banque Nationale de Paris (1966-2000)
- Banque Neuflize-Schlumberger-Mallet (1966-2006)
- Banque Arabe Internationale d'Investissement (1973-1992)
- Banque Indosuez (1975-1996)
- Société de Banque Occidentale (1981-1996)
- Banque Pallas-Stern (1983-1997)
- Banque Colbert (1992-1995)
- Dexia (1996-2011)
- Zebank (2001-2002)

== See also ==
- List of banks in the euro area
- List of banks in Europe
