= List of banks in Algeria =

This is a list of commercial banks in Algeria, as updated in late 2024 by the Bank of Algeria.

== List of commercial banks ==
1. Banque Extérieure d'Algérie (BEA)
2. Banque Nationale d'Algérie (BNA)
3. Banque de l'Agriculture et du Développement Rural (BADR)
4. Banque de développement local (BDL)
5. Crédit Populaire d'Algérie (CPA)
6. Caisse Nationale d'Épargne et de Prévoyance (CNEP Banque)
7. Banque Nationale de l'Habitat
8. Banque Al Baraka Algerie, part of Al Baraka Group
9. Bank ABC
10. Natixis Algérie, part of BPCE Group (see also Banxy)
11. Société Générale Algérie, part of Société Générale Group
12. Citibank N.A. Algérie, branch of Citibank
13. Arab Bank PLC Algérie, branch of Arab Bank
14. BNP Paribas El Djazair, part of BNP Paribas Group
15. Gulf Bank Algeria (AGB), part of Gulf Bank Group
16. Housing Bank for Trade and Finance - Algeria (HBTF-Algeria), part of HBTF Group
17. Fransabank El Djazair, part of Fransabank Group
18. Al Salam Bank - Algeria (ASBA), part of Bank Muscat Group
19. H.S.B.C. Algeria, branch of HSBC

== See also ==
- List of banks in Africa
