= Banque de développement local =

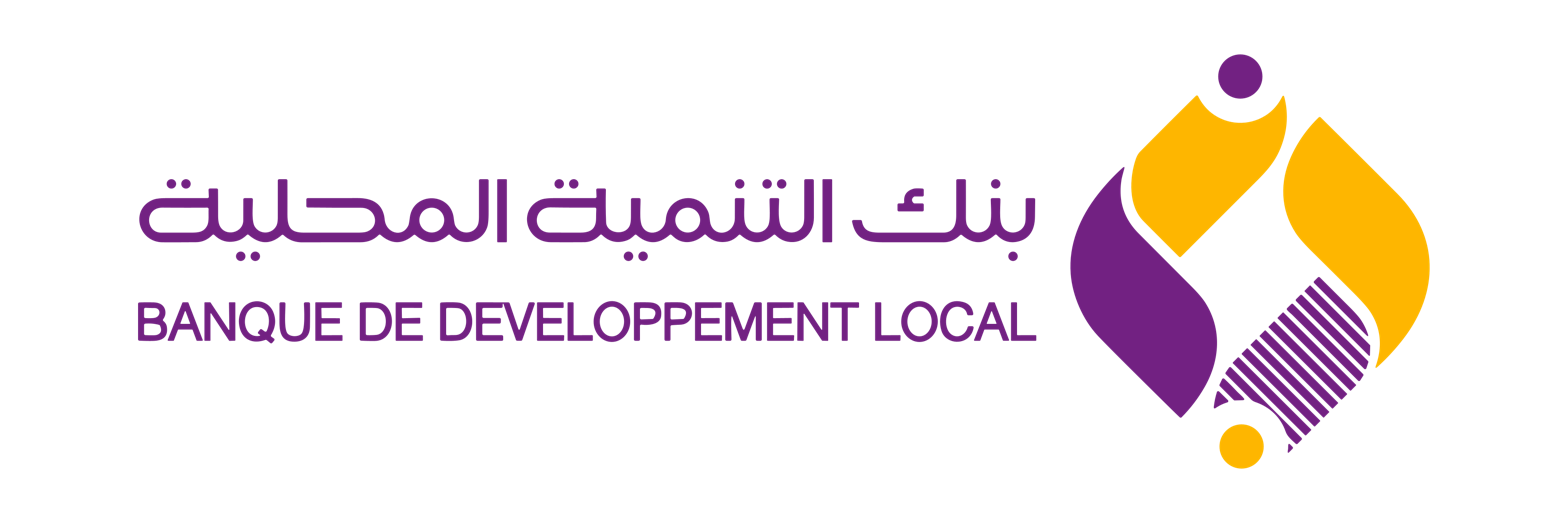

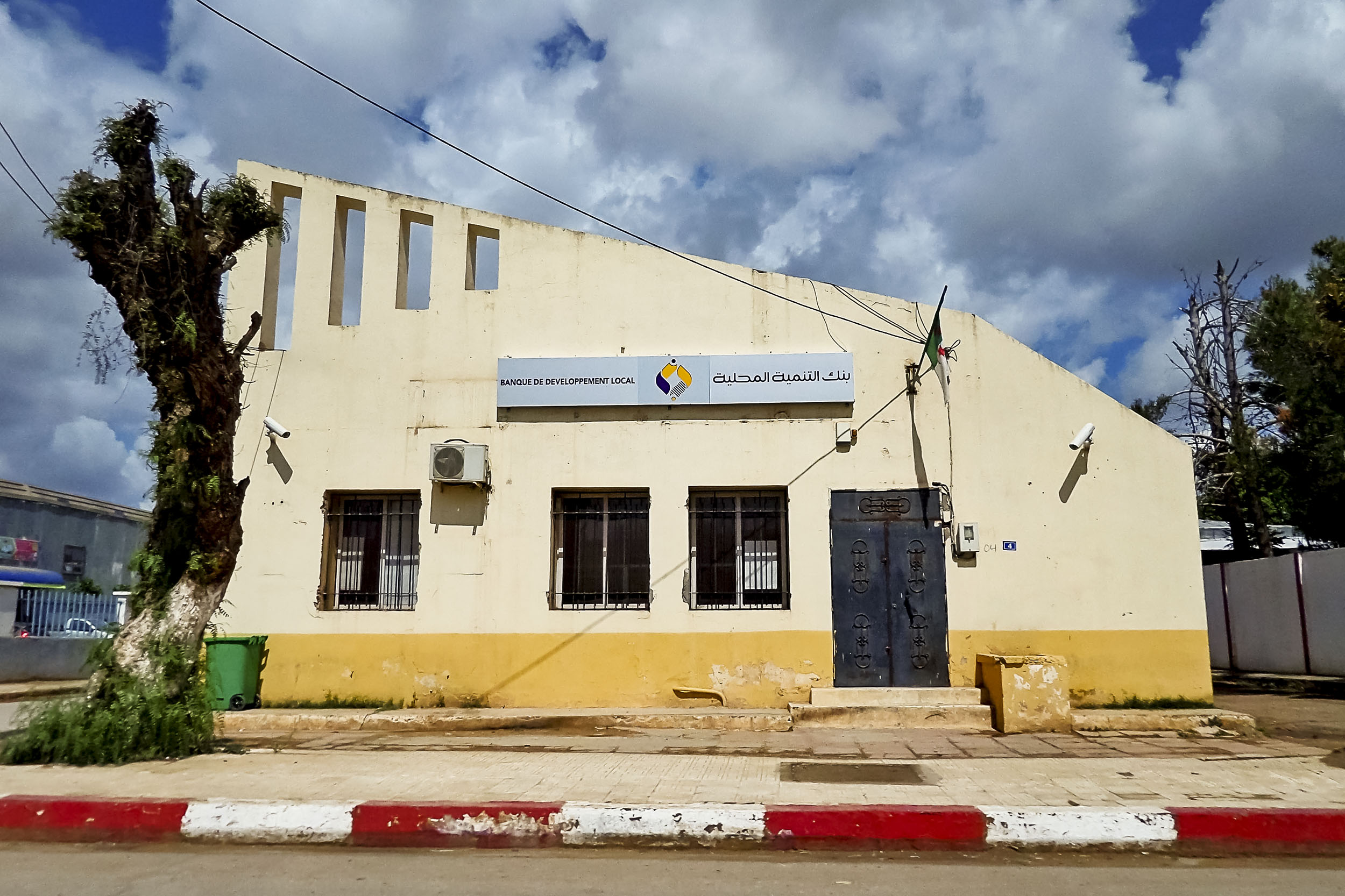
- BDL branch in Ghriss
- Type: Joint-stock company
- Traded as: SGBV: BDL
- Industry: Banking
- Founded: 30 April 1985
- Headquarters: 5, rue Gaci Amar, Staoueli, Algiers Province, Algeria
- Key people: Kamel Mansouri, director-general
- Total assets: US$11 billion (2024)
- Owner: Government of Algeria (100%)
- Number of employees: 4,424 (2018)
- Website: www.bdl.dz
- Footnotes; Bank code: BDLODZAL

Banque de développement local (BDL; Arabic: بنك التنمية المحلية; Berber: lbanka n unegmu amnaḍan) is an Algerian public bank established in 1985.

== History ==
BDL was established on 30 April 1985 by Decree No. 85-85, which also defined its functions, operating procedures and resources. The decree specified its principal mission as “contributing to the economic and social development of local authorities”. To this end, the decree stated that “banking activities carried out by other financial institutions and falling within the bank’s remit are transferred to it”, a provision that affected the Crédit Populaire d'Algérie.

In July 2018, BDL launched a Mastercard card, allowing customers to make online purchases and to carry out payments and withdrawals in foreign currency abroad. A Visa card was also introduced.

In December 2024, the partial opening of BDL’s capital, amounting to 30%, was announced ahead of its listing on the Algiers Stock Exchange. In March 2025, the bank was listed on the Stock Exchange and became the eighth publicly traded company in Algeria.

== Structure ==
In July 2023, BDL had a network of 164 branches across Algeria.

== Logo ==
Former BDL logo until 2015.

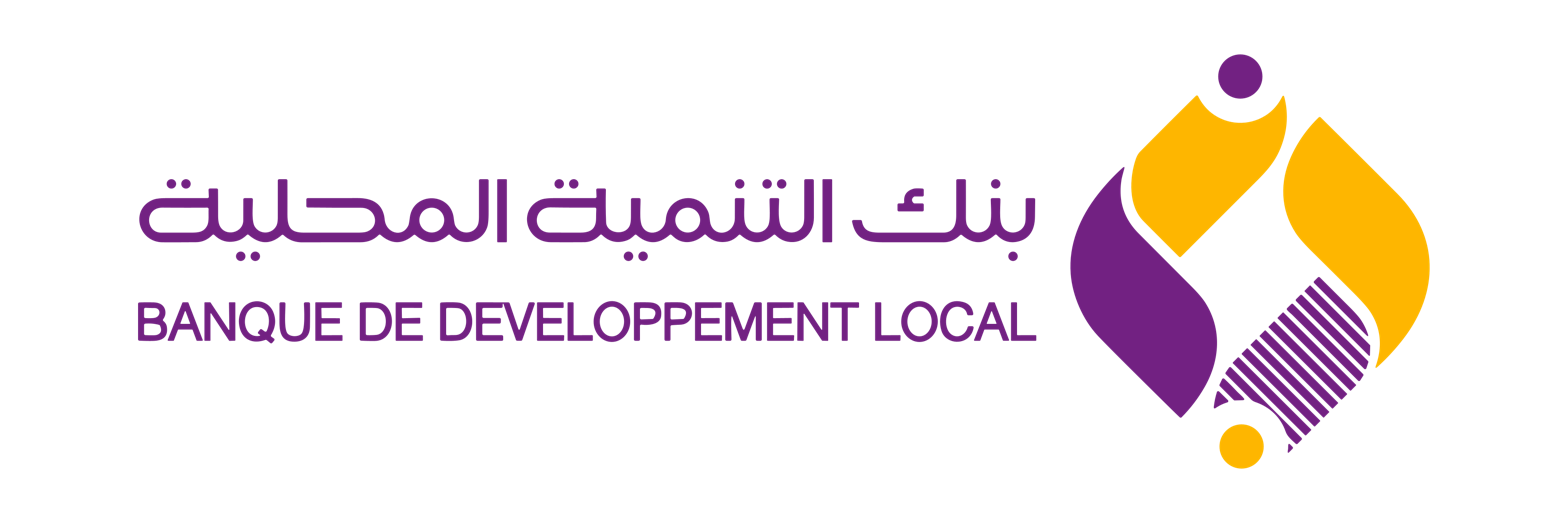
BDL logo since 2015.

== Governance ==
Until 29 April 2021, BDL was headed by a president and chief executive officer. It was subsequently placed under a chairman of the board and a director-general.

== See also ==
- List of largest banks in Africa
- List of banks in Algeria
- Economy of Algeria
