= HSBC Continental Europe =

European bank

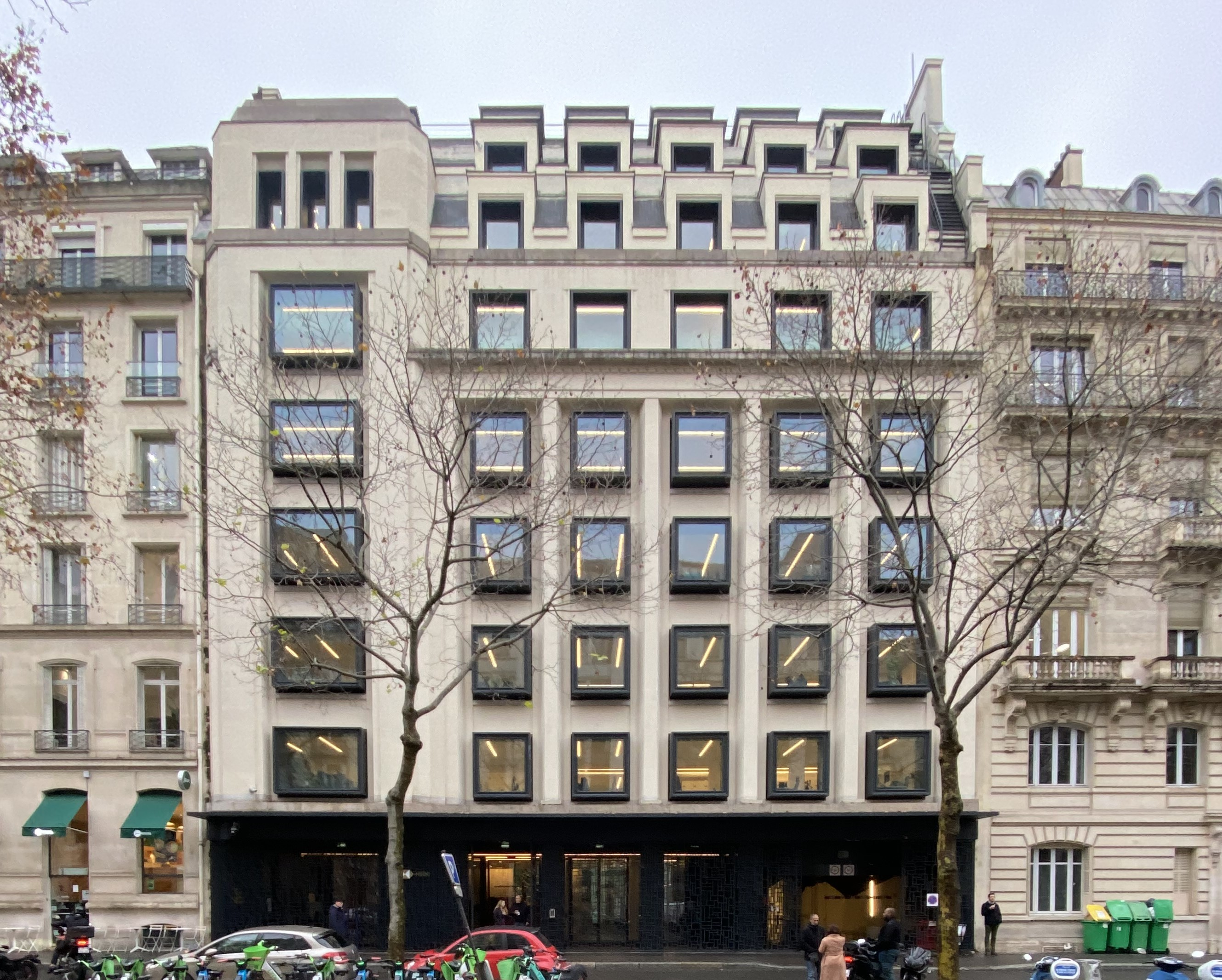
- Company type: Subsidiary
- Industry: Finance and Insurance
- Founded: 1894
- Headquarters: 38 avenue Kléber, Paris, France
- Key people: Andrew Wild (CEO)
- Products: Financial services
- Number of employees: 11,700
- Parent: HSBC
- Website: www.hsbc.fr

HSBC Continental Europe, known until December 2020 as HSBC France SA, is a subsidiary of HSBC, headquartered in Paris.

It has been designated as a Significant Institution since the entry into force of European Banking Supervision in late 2014, and as a consequence is directly supervised by the European Central Bank.

== History ==
When HSBC acquired Crédit Commercial de France (CCF) in 2000, CCF was operating with 650 branches and assets of €69 billion. In April 2000, HSBC announced its intention to acquire the bank and completed the deal in July. That month, HSBC Holdings listed on the Paris Stock Exchange for the first time. The acquisition enabled HSBC to establish itself in one of the main European markets and to build a strong platform in the euro zone. CCF continued to expand with the purchase of Banque Pelletier (2000) and Banque Hervet (2001). CCF won a bidding-war for Banque Hervet, which the French government was re-privatizing, when its bid of $480 million beat out bids from Paribas, Credit du Nord - Dexia, and insurer Groupama.

With the acquisition of CCF, HSBC acquired CCF's stake in Lombard Bank in Malta. At the time, HSBC already owned the largest bank in Malta. In 2002, HSBC sold its shares in Lombard Bank Malta to Swiss-based Banca Unione di Credito.

CCF also sold its 93.3 per cent stake in Crédit International d’Egypte (CIE), an Egyptian commercial bank listed on the Cairo Stock Exchange, to Crédit Agricole Indosuez (75%) and the El Mansour and El Maghraby groups (25%). HSBC was already operating in Egypt through HSBC Bank Egypt.

In 2002, CCF acquired 11 branches outside Paris from Banque Worms/Deutsche Bank.

HSBC S.A. was formed on 1 November 2005 when HSBC rebranded CCF, together with its subsidiaries UBP, Banque de Picardie and Banque Hervet. The bank later changed its name to HSBC France.

About half of the former networks of CCF - Union de Banques à Paris, Banque Hervet, Banque de Picardie and Banque de Baecque Beau - traded as HSBC as a result. This represented a 380 strong network of branches in France with a very strong presence in the Paris region.

Other group operations in France include a significant HSBC Private Bank presence, along with a major Corporate Institutional Banking and Markets operation. The Paris trading floor is the Group's second-largest trading floor in Europe. Specific areas of particular expertise and responsibility are the trading of government bonds and euro interest rate derivatives, arranging of corporate cash calls, disintermediated and structured finance and project finance.

HSBC France had seven regional subsidiaries with 420 branches, but sold them to Banque Populaire in 2008. These regional subsidiaries were Société Marseillaise de Crédit, Banque de Savoie, Banque Chaix, Banque Marze, Banque Dupuy, de Parseval, Banque Pelletier and Crédit Commercial du Sud Ouest.

On 1 December 2020, HSBC France rebranded to "HSBC Continental Europe" along with all HSBC European branches (Belgium, Spain, Greece, Ireland, Italy, Luxembourg, the Netherlands, Poland, Czechia and Sweden) with the exception of HSBC Malta. The move was expected to create "a modernized universal banking model" and provide "a new momentum to its European operations". On the same day, HSBC relocated its Paris headquarters to 38, avenue Kléber.

In March 2021 it was reported that HSBC was in talks to sell its French retail division to Cerberus Capital Management. This sale was concluded in January 2024.

== Controversy ==
In 2010 the French government's Autorité de la concurrence (the department in charge of regulating competition) fined eleven French banks, including HSBC France, the sum of 384,900,000 Euros for colluding to charge unjustified fees on check processing, especially for extra fees charged during the transition from paper check transfer to "Exchanges Check-Image" electronic transfer.

== See also ==
- List of banks in France
- List of banks in the euro area
