= Caisse des Emprunts =

Former French financial entity

The Caisse des Emprunts (lit. 'bank of debts') was a financial entity of the Kingdom of France, first created by Jean-Baptiste Colbert in 1674, terminated shortly after his death in 1683, then revived from 1702 to 1714. It represented an ultimately unsuccessful attempt to organize the debt financing of Louis XIV's wars.

== First Caisse des Emprunts ==
Colbert established the Caisse des Emprunts on 11 October 1674, a decision confirmed by an order (arrêt) of the Conseil du Roi of 17 October 1676.

The financially fragile Caisse des Emprunts was terminated on 9 September 1683, three days after Colbert's death, as the finances portfolio came under the control of Colbert's rival Claude Le Peletier. Its liquidation was confirmed in several orders of the Conseil du Roi, from 25 September 1683 to 8 August 1684.

== Second Caisse des Emprunts ==
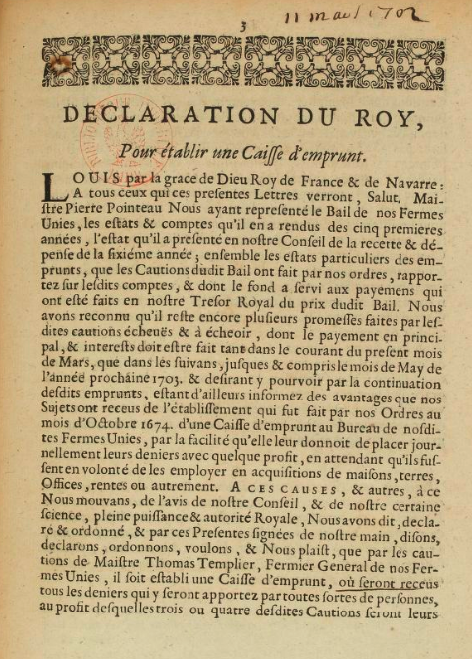
Déclaration du Roi pour établir une Caisse d'Emprunt, 11 March 1702; Bibliothèque nationale de France

The Caisse des Emprunts was revived in the early phase of the War of the Spanish Succession, by royal proclamation of 11 March 1702. It collected deposits and remunerated them at a rate initially set at 8 percent, then raised to reach 10 percent in 1705 and reduced to 6 percent in 1710. In exchange of cash, the Caisse issued bills (French: promesses) which it also used as payment for precious metal deliveries by merchants, e.g. from Saint-Malo.

By 1708, the Caisse's bills had reached a total of about 36 million livres, representing nearly ten percent of the total French government securities. The Caisse des Emprunts remained too weak to play a full-fledged role of fiscal agent, as the Bank of England did at the same time for Great Britain.

The Caisse was unable to honor its promises of reimbursement, however, and Louis XIV closed it on 15 December 1714 while committing to reimbursement over 20 years. Its bills were included in the broader debt restructuring initiated after Louis XIV'x death in 1715 and known as the opération du visa.

== See also ==
- Caisse de l'Extraordinaire
- List of banks in France
