= Crédit Populaire d'Algérie =

Algerian publicly owned bank

Crédit populaire d'Algérie
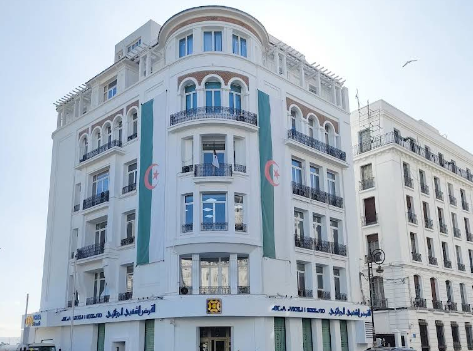
- Type: Joint-stock company
- Traded as: SGBV: BPA
- Industry: Banking
- Founded: 1966
- Headquarters: 2, Boulevard Colonel-Amirouche, Algiers, Algeria
- Key people: Mohamed Larbi, chairman of the board; Ali Kadri, director-general
- Total assets: US$25 billion (2024)
- Owner: Government of Algeria (75%); other shareholders (25%)
- Number of employees: 4,200
- Website: www.cpa-bank.dz
- Footnotes; Bank code: CPALDZALXXX

Crédit populaire d'Algérie (CPA; Arabic: القرض الشعبي الجزائري) is an Algerian public bank founded in 1966.

== History ==
CPA was established in 1966 by Ordinance No. 66-366 of 29 December 1966. Initially, it took over the activities of five foreign popular banks: Banque Populaire Commerciale et Industrielle d’Alger (BPCI Alger), Banque Populaire Commerciale et Industrielle d’Oran (BPCI Oran), Banque Populaire Commerciale et Industrielle de Constantine (BPCI Constantine), Banque Populaire Commerciale et Industrielle d’Annaba (BPCI Annaba), and Banque Populaire du Crédit d’Algérie (BPCA).

From 1967, CPA also took over the activities of Banque Algérie-Misr, the Société marseillaise de Crédit in Algeria (SMC Algérie), the Compagnie française de Crédit et de Banque (CFCB), and Banque populaire arabe (BPA).

Since 1966, and under the ordinance on the management of state merchant capital, public economic banks have been supervised by the Ministry of Finance.

On 7 April 1997, CPA obtained its licence from the Money and Credit Council under the law on money and credit, becoming the second bank in Algeria to be accredited after Banque nationale d'Algérie (BNA).

With its listing on the Algiers Stock Exchange in early 2024, CPA offered 22 million shares for sale, a quantity that could be increased to 60 million while remaining within the limit of 30% of the bank’s share capital.

== Structure ==
In 2023, CPA had a network of 161 branches across Algeria, overseen by 15 operating groups.

Under its statutes, CPA is a commercial and universal bank. Its mission is to promote the development of the economy, covering building, public works and hydraulics, as well as the health and pharmaceutical sectors, trade and distribution, hotels and tourism, media, small and medium-sized enterprises and industries, and crafts. After the promulgation of the law on enterprise autonomy in 1988, CPA became an economic public enterprise organized as a joint-stock company.

== Governance ==
The bank is headed by a chairman of the board and a director-general.

== See also ==
- List of largest banks in Africa
- List of banks in Algeria
