= Banque de Mulhouse =

Former bank in the German Empire and France

The Banque de Mulhouse was a bank in the German Empire territory of Alsace–Lorraine, then after World War I in France, based in Mulhouse. It was often referred to as the "bank of cotton and wool" with reference to its role in financing Mulhouse's textile industry.

The Banque de Mulhouse operated in French and marketed itself under its French name, except during World War I when it had to Germanize its operations and went by Bank von Mülhausen from 1915 to 1918.

== History ==
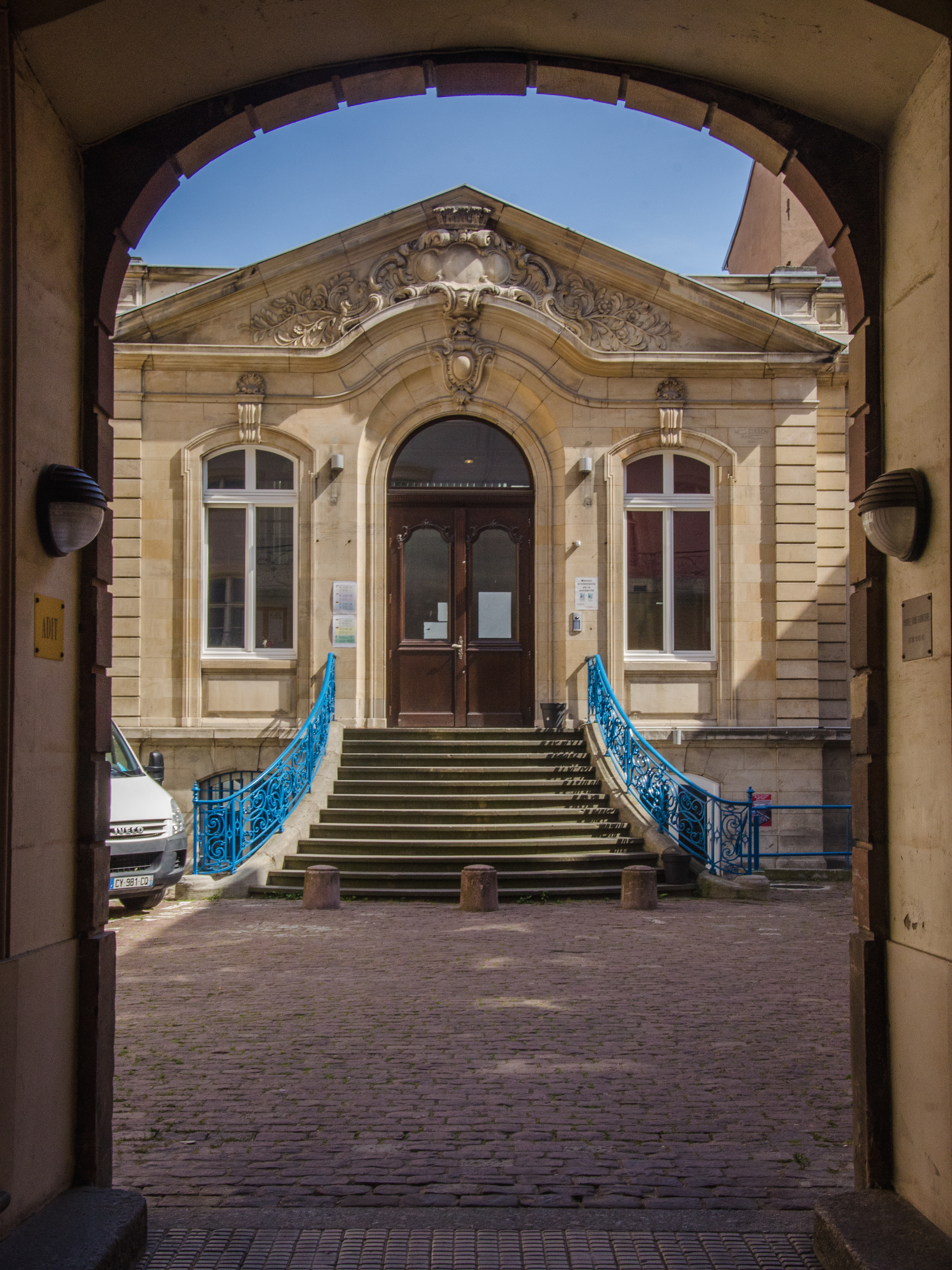
Former branch of the Banque de Mulhouse in Strasbourg

=== German Empire and World War I ===
The Banque de Mulhouse was founded by contract of 8 November 1871, shortly after the annexation of Alsace-Lorraine following the Franco-Prussian War. Its founders were a coalition of Mulhouse's most prominent merchants and industrialists together with Swiss bankers mostly from nearby Basel and also from Geneva, Winterthur and Zurich. Their primary aim was to replace the credit services previously provided by the Bank of France, which had been terminated in late 1870 and were not fully replaced by the Bank of Prussia's opening of a Mulhouse branch in July 1871. The Comptoir d'escompte de Mulhouse (CEM) had been present in the city since its foundation in 1848 but was not viewed at the time as sufficient to support the local activity. Upon creation, the bank took over the existing business of local banker Amédée Schlumberger-Ehinger, who had decided to relocate to Basel following the German takeover. The bank's shares were negotiable in Basel, even though they were not formally listed on any stock exchange.

The bank started operations in January 1872, survived the panic of 1873, and expanded quickly to become the leading bank in the territory by the early 1880s. In 1882, the bank inaugurated its new head office in Mulhouse, on land it had purchased in 1879, at the corner of rue Lamartine and rue de la Sinne. By 1887, its total assets were twenty times larger than the CEM's.

Like the other two major Alsatian banks, the CEM and the Banque d'Alsace et de Lorraine (BAL), the Banque de Mulhouse benefited from the unique position of Alsace-Lorraine, channeling abundant French savings towards the capital-hungry German economy. Also like its two main Alsatian peers, it soon expanded into French territory, opening its first branches in 1877 in Strasbourg but also Épinal, followed by Colmar (1883), Belfort (1896), then Le Havre, Montbéliard and Paris in 1909, as the bank accelerated its growth in response to the CEM's aggressive expansion in the previous two decades. Even so, the CEM surpassed the Banque de Mulhouse as Alsace-Lorraine's leading bank in 1912. The Banque de Mulhouse regained its crown in 1913, however, after the CEM spun off its French network as the Banque Nationale de Crédit.

During World War I, the closing of the French-German border split the Bank de Mulhouse into two entities. In Paris, some of the bank's board members established a separate management for the French network, which was duly registered with the local business court. By the war's end, most of the bank's activity was on the French side, even though the German side was more profitable.

=== Interwar period and merger ===
After the armistice and the return of Alsace-Lorraine to France, the bank's development became less dynamic and largely focused on the Paris market. An exception which would prove fateful was its commitment in 1919 as partner of the BAL and the Banque de Strasbourg in establishing the Banque de la Sarre et des Pays rhénans in Saarbrücken, in which the Banque de Mulhouse held a 27 percent stake. In 1921, it purchased buildings on No.s 21, 21 bis and 23, boulevard Malesherbes in Paris as its new head office in the capital, while keeping the location it had opened in 1909 at 4, rue de la Paix as a branch.

In 1926, the Banque de Mulhouse was surpassed by the Société Générale Alsacienne de Banque (Sogenal) as the largest Alsatian credit institution. In early 1927, it undertook merger discussions with Sogenal, which however foundered on disagreement as to whether the head office would be located in Mulhouse or Strasbourg.

By mid-1928, the Banque de Mulhouse had become a main supporter of the Banque de la Sarre et des Pays rhénans which experienced financial distress and eventually had to be liquidated. It sought a shotgun marriage and initiated negotiations with the Sogenal, the Banque Nationale de Crédit and the Crédit Commercial de France (CCF), which made the most favorable offer in early September 1928. The Banque de Mulhouse's merger into CCF was publicized on 14 September 1928 and fully completed on 31 January 1929. The transaction propelled the CCF to seventh rank among all French banks in 1929, measured by deposits.

== Leadership ==
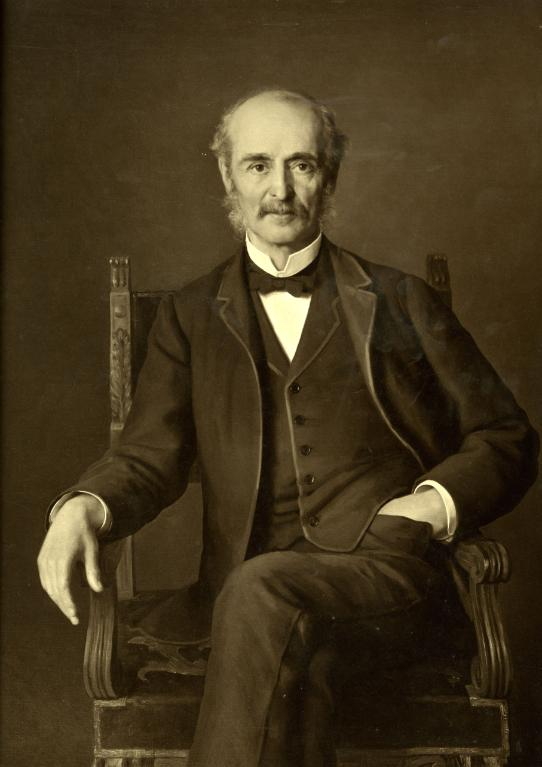
Édouard Mieg (1823–1894), the bank's first chairman

The main leaders of the Banque de Mulhouse were as follow:

=== Chairmen (présidents) ===
- Édouard Mieg, 1871–1874
- Lazare Lantz, 1874–1909
- Eugène Favre, 1909–1918
- Jean Lantz, 1918–1929

=== Chief executives (directeurs) ===
- Jules Turian, 1871–1874
- Charles Brettauer, 1871–1874
- Alexandre Haas, 1871–1908
- Charles Silbereisen, 1908–1911
- Frédéric A. Thyss, 1909–1914
- Jules Gugenheim, 1911–1928
- Jean Brun, 1928-1929

== See also ==
- List of banks in France
