= Banque de Strasbourg =

Former bank based in Strasbourg

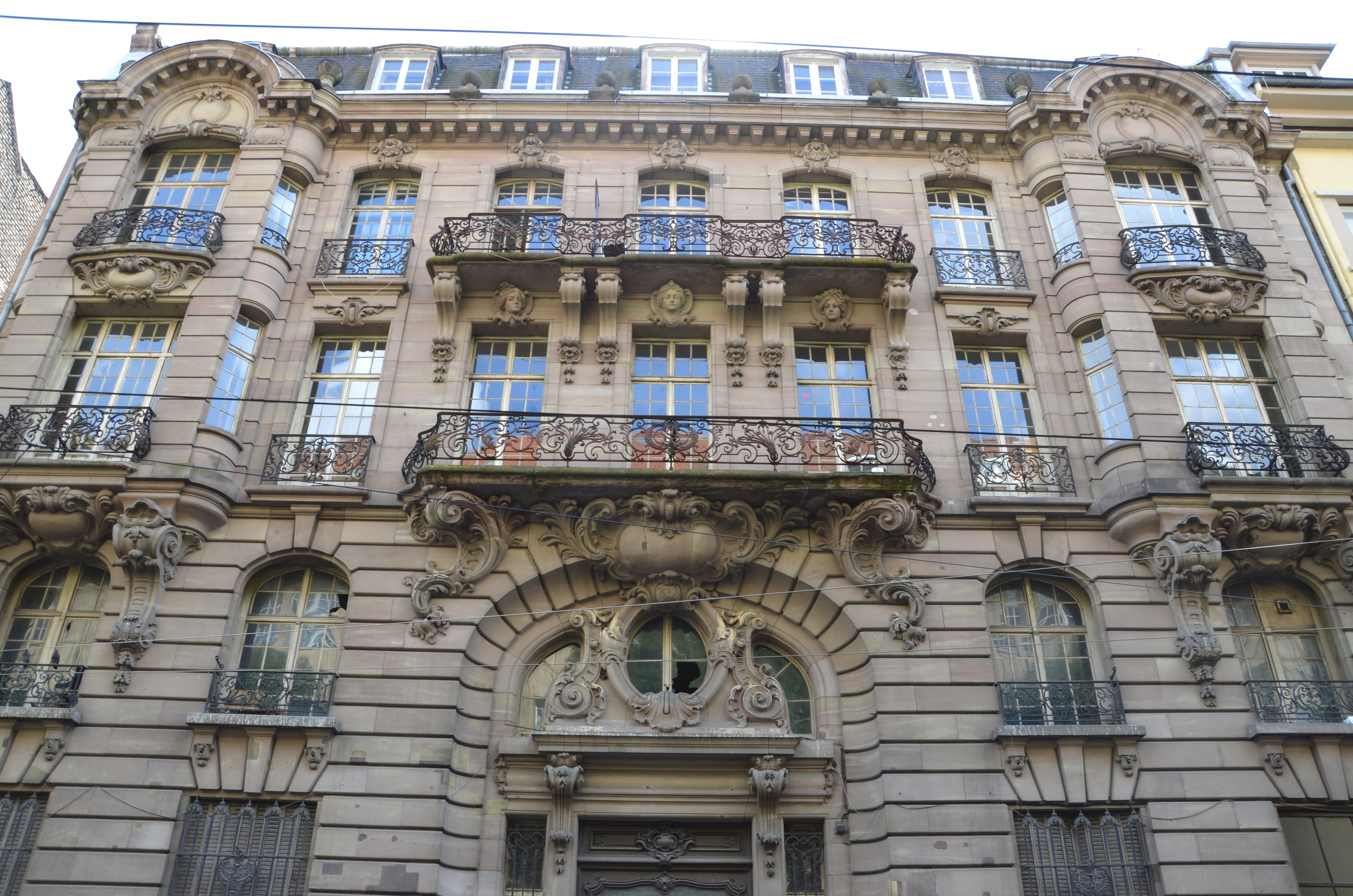
Former head office building of the Banque de Strasbourg at 24, rue du Vieux-Marché-aux-Vins in Strasbourg, completed 1901 on a design by architects Jacques Albert Brion and Eugène Haug

The Banque de Strasbourg (German: Strassburger Bank) was a medium-sized Alsatian bank based in Strasbourg, known before 1920 as Ch. Staehling, L. Valentin & Cie. It was founded in 1873 by merger of several local private banks. Its activity stopped in late 1940 in the wake of the German annexation of Alsace–Lorraine.

The bank went by "Ch. Staehling, L. Valentin & Cie - Banque de Strasbourg" in the 1920s, and by "Banque de Strasbourg - anciennement Ch. Staehling, L. Valentin & Cie" in the 1930s.

== Overview ==
The bank was former in 1873 by merger of Edouard Gloxin & Cie (est. 1852), Edmond Klose & Cie, and Charles Staehling & Cie (est. 1839). The architect of the merger was Marie-Louis Valentin, who worked at the Klose bank and led the merged entity until 1904.

Under the German Empire, the bank limited its activity to Strasbourg. After World War I and Alsace's return to France, it expanded by opening its first branches in Haguenau, Wissembourg, and Colmar, then others adding up to a network of 20 branches outside Strasbourg by 1923.

The Banque de Strasbourg entered a period of financial stress in the late 1920s, and was reorganized in 1933 with support from the Société Générale Alsacienne de Banque (SGAB).

In 1939, the bank's leadership relocated to Périgueux. German forces in annexed Alsace appointed Richard Betz as banking commissioner, with wide powers to reorganize the local banking sector in the German interest. Betz decided to liquidate the Banque de Strasbourg in December 1940. By liberation in 1944, the process was too advanced to be reversed. The liquidation process was protracted in the postwar era, and the Banque de Strasbourg eventually closed in 1963.

== See also ==
- List of banks in France
