= Caisse de Garantie et d'Amortissement =

The Caisse de garantie et d'amortissement (literally the Guarantees and Amortization Fund) was a French financial institution set up by the French Consulate in 1800 to spread the national debt. Re-formed several times between 1804 and 1811, it was finally liquidated in 1816 and replaced by the Caisse des dépôts et consignations.

== See also ==
- List of banks in France

== Sources ==
- « Bulletin des Lois de la République », n° 1, p. 8-9. In : Bulletin des Lois de la République Française, 3e série, tome 1 : Contenant les Lois et Arrêtés rendus depuis le mois de Nivôse jusqu'au dernier jour Complémentaire an VIII, Paris, Imprimerie de la République, an IX (1800).
