= Banque de l'Agriculture et du Développement Rural =

Algerian publicly owned bank

Banque de l'agriculture et du développement rural
- Type: Joint-stock company
- Industry: Banking
- Founded: 1982
- Headquarters: 17, Boulevard Colonel-Amirouche, Algiers Province, Algeria
- Key people: Nacer Laouami, chairman of the board; Mohand Bourai, director-general
- Net income: DZD 70.76 billion (2021)
- Total assets: DZD 1849.34 billion (2021)
- Owner: Government of Algeria (100%)
- Number of employees: 7,800 (2023)
- Website: badrbank.dz
- Footnotes; Bank code: BADRDZAL

Banque de l'agriculture et du développement rural (BADR; Arabic: بنك الفلاحة والتنمية الريفية) is an Algerian public bank. Its network currently comprises 340 branches and more than 7,800 employees. The density of its branch network and the size of its workforce make BADR the largest banking network in Algeria.

== History ==
BADR was established on 13 March 1982 by Decree No. 82-106 as a joint-stock company.

In the early 2000s, BADR granted a loan of 65 billion dinars to Tonic Emballage, an Algerian small and medium-sized enterprise. Following the bankruptcy of Tonic Emballage, the loan had adverse consequences for the bank’s operations.

In May 2016, the bank opened its first stock-exchange service point.

In 2017, BADR announced that it would launch Islamic financial services before the end of the year by offering banking products compliant with Sharia.

== Structure ==
BADR currently has a network of over 340 branches and 39 regional directorates across Algeria (2025/26).

== Governance ==
Until 29 April 2021, the bank was headed by a president and chief executive officer. It was subsequently placed under a chairman of the board and a director-general.

== See also ==
- List of banks in Algeria
- Economy of Algeria
