= Caisse de l'Extraordinaire =

Former French financial institution

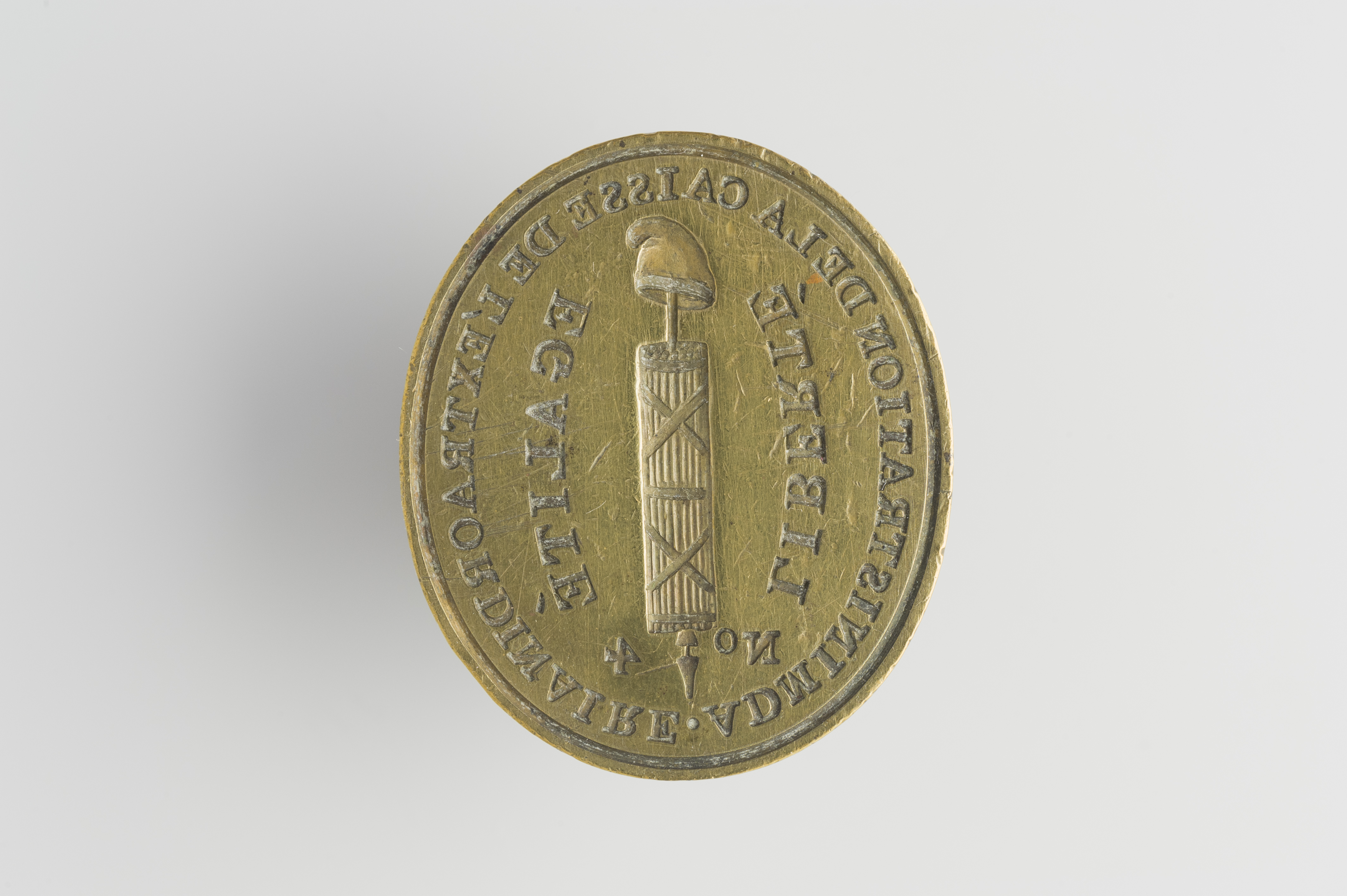
Seal with the inscription "Administration de la Caisse de l'Extraordinaire" together with the symbol of revolutionary France (fasces with a Phrygian cap on top) and the abridged motto "Liberté - Égalité", held at the Musée Carnavalet

The Caisse de l'Extraordinaire was a public financial institution established in late 1789 during the French Revolution to issue paper currency backed by the biens nationaux, the numerous properties (most formerly church-owned) that were nationalized by the revolutionary assembly. As such, the Caisse de l'Extraordinaire initiated the issuance of assignats, which continued after the Caisse itself was merged into the French Treasury at the start of 1793.

The institution's name referred to the extraordinaire, a longstanding practice in France of keeping a separate budget for alleged non-recurring government operations such as war expenditures, as opposed to current operations known as dépenses ordinaires. The French monarchy had first introduced that practice in the 14th century to support the expenses of the Hundred Years' War.

== Establishment ==
France's dire financial situation had led the National Constituent Assembly to nationalize the biens nationaux on 2 November 1789, upon a proposal by Charles Maurice de Talleyrand-Périgord. It then established the Caisse de l'Extraordinaire by legislative decree of 19 December 1789, by which the new institution was granted the future revenue that was expected to come from the sale of the confiscated properties. The decree mandated the Caisse to issue interest-bearing assignats, namely bonds of a nominal value of 1,000 livres and yielding a fixed rate of 5 percent, for which the expected revenue flow was earmarked (assigné). The assignats, in turn, could be exchanged against any government debt paper.

The enabling legislation capped its issuance at only 400 million, namely 100m in each of 1791 and 1792, 80m in each of 1793 and 1794, and 40m in 1795. Since the value of the biens nationaux was assessed at at least two billion livres, the Caisse appeared solidly capitalized.

The initial financial concept of the Caisse echoed John Law's Essay on a Land Bank, written in 1703 or 1704. In that proposal, Law suggested that property-backed securities could provide a beneficial alternative to metallic money.

== Development ==
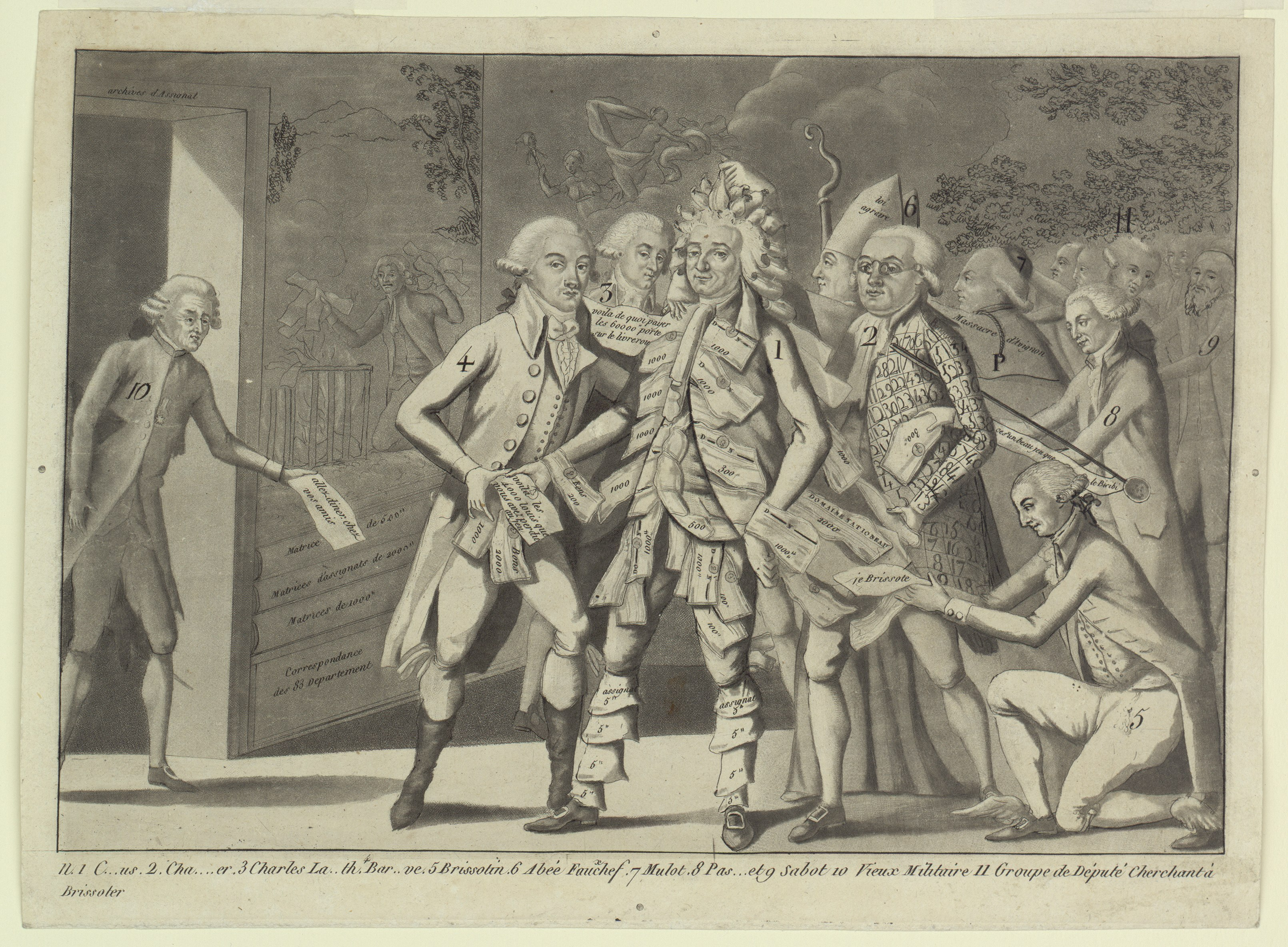
L'Homme aux assignats, November 1791 caricature of Armand-Gaston Camus, deputy and commissioner of the Caisse de l'Extraordinaire, represented in a suit made of assignats which are grabbed by greedy political insiders: from left to right, Antoine Barnave, Charles Lameth, Claude Fauchet, Isaac Le Chapelier, François-Valentin Mulot, Jacques Brissot (kneeling), and Claude-Emmanuel de Pastoret. On the far left, an impoverished army veteran (vieux militaire) begs for payment of his pension and is told to "go have dinner with your friends" (allez dîner chez vos amis).

Whether sound or not in theory, however, that initial concept was soon ignored in practice by the French authorities as their financial needs became increasingly pressing, and the assignats (despite their name) increasingly assumed attributes of fiat money. On 17 April 1790, the role of the Caisse's assignats was expanded to become a general means of payment by the French state: the government was granted the right to pay any financial liability with assignats (the so-called forced circulation or cours forcé), of which the interest rate was reduced to 3 percent. Simultaneously, assignats of 200 and 300 livres were introduced in parallel to those of 1,000 livres, facilitating their use as payment currency. On 29 September 1790, the National Constituent Assembly reduced the interest to zero, and doubled the Caisse's issuance cap to 800 million livres. Assignats of only 50 and 100 livres were introduced by legislation of 8 October 1790, and of 5 livres on 6 May 1791. The cap was further raised to 1.3 billion on 28 September 1791, to 1.6 billion on 17 December 1791, 2 billion on 31 July 1792, and 2.4 billion on 24 October 1792, two months after the invasion of France that initiated the Revolutionary Wars.

With increasing volumes of assignats issued and no withdrawals of the earlier issuances, this inevitably triggered hyperinflation and depreciation of the assignats' exchange value in both specie and foreign currency. By the end of 1792, the market value of assignats in specie was at a discount of 30 to 50 percent below their par value, varying across French regions. The Caisse was eventually merged into the Trésorerie Générale by decree of 4 January 1793 with retroactive effect on 1 January 1793, by which time the assignats became pure government notes.

== Leadership ==
By July 1791, the Caisse was under the authority of a managing commissioner (French: commissaire administrateur) and a treasurer (trésorier de l'extraordinaire). The managing commissioner had the rank of a cabinet minister. More non-executive commissioners were in charge of the Caisse's oversight.

- Antoine Léon Anne Amelot de Chaillou, managing commissioner
- Jacques-Jean Le Couteulx du Molay, Treasurer
- Armand-Gaston Camus, commissioner
- François Pougeard du Limbert, commissioner until August 1791
- Antoine Melon, commissioner from May 1791

== See also ==
- John Law's Bank
- Russian Assignation Bank
- List of banks in France
