= Société Générale Alsacienne de Banque =

Bank based in Strasbourg, France

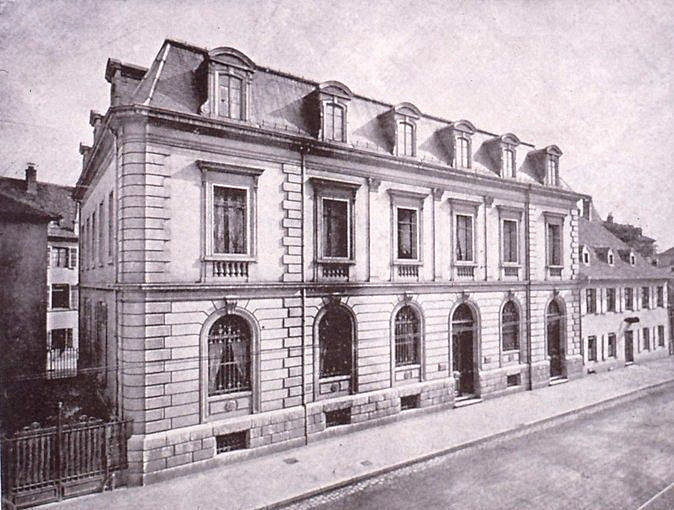
- The banks headquarters in Strasbourg in 1902
- Company type: Public company Société anonyme
- Industry: Financial services
- Founded: October 15, 1881; 144 years ago
- Defunct: 2001
- Fate: Merged into its parent company
- Successor: Societe Generale
- Headquarters: Strasbourg, France
- Area served: Alsace
- Products: Banking services
- Owner: Societe Generale

The Société Générale Alsacienne de Banque (SGAB, German: Allgemeine Elsässische Bankgesellschaft, lit. 'General Alsatian Bank Company'), sometimes referred to colloquially as l'Alsacienne and operating commercially as Sogenal from 1955, was a minority-owned affiliate of Société Générale based in Strasbourg.

It was formed in 1881 when Alsace–Lorraine was part of the German Empire. It was unique among Alsatian banks in expanding into the rest of the Empire, especially on the left bank of the Rhine. It remained a separate entity following France's recovery of Alsace–Lorraine after World War I and grew to become the leading Alsatian bank in the second half of the 20th century.

The Société Générale acquired a majority stake in Sogenal in 1985, and fully integrated it into its own network and brand in 2001.

== History ==
=== Foundation ===
The Société Générale, founded in Paris in 1864, soon opened branches in Alsace at the initiative of its co-founder Eugène Schneider, in Strasbourg (1866) then Mulhouse in 1869 and Colmar in 1870.

Following the Franco-Prussian War and the Treaty of Frankfurt, Société Générale found itself the only large French bank with branches in Alsace. That position was challenged by political developments in Alsace, as so-called protesters (French: protestataires) against the annexation gained a large following and reached absolute majority in the 1881 German federal election. The German authorities responded with assimilationist policies, including efforts to phase out the direct local operation of French businesses.

=== German Empire ===
In response to the new policy, Société Générale formed the Société Générale Alsacienne de Banque on 15 October 1881 as a foreign affiliate under German law, in partnership with a group of Alsatian industrialists led by Alfred Herrenschmidt, and brought its three Alsatian branches against one third of equity capital in the new venture. The new bank soon opened more branches in Alsace–Lorraine and beyond: Metz and Guebwiller (1882), Frankfurt (1886), Oberstein and Luxembourg (1893), Mainz (1894), and Lausanne (1897). The Luxembourg branch was the first-ever foreign banking establishment in Luxembourg. It was located at the corner of Boulevard Royal et avenue de l'Arsenal.

Even as its shares were traded on the Frankfurt Stock Exchange from 1890 onwards, the SGAB remained under close oversight of its Parisian parent, including through the operation of the Société Générale's internal audit (French: inspection générale) from 1900. In the following years, it opened new locations in multiple Alsatian towns as well as Kehl across the Rhine. In 1909, the Société Générale took over the SGAB's Lausanne branch and reorganized it into its own Swiss subsidiary named Société Suisse de Banque et de Dépôts, while the SGAB took a minority stake in the Société Française de Banque et de Dépôts, registered in Paris but operating in Brussels as the Société Générale's Belgian affiliate. During World War I, the Germanisation effort intensified and the SGAB was mandated to operate in German, like other Alsatian banks.

=== Interwar period and World War II ===
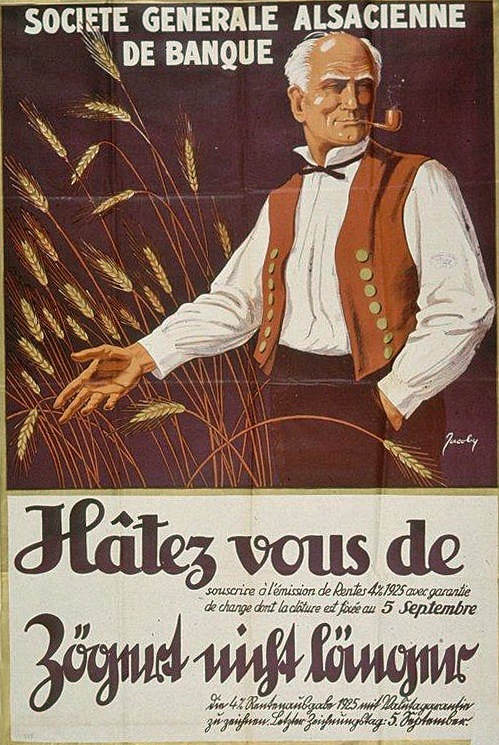
Bilingual poster advert of the Société Générale Alsacienne de Banque, 1925

Following the war's end, after some hesitation the Société Générale decided to keep the SGAB as a separate entity from the rest of its network, taking over its expansion into the German-speaking world. In line with that strategy, the SGAB opened new branches in Cologne, Ludwigshafen, and Saarbrücken in 1919, Wiesbaden in 1923, Düsseldorf in 1924, then Zurich in 1926. In 1927, it initiated the construction of a monumental branch building in Mulhouse, designed by architect Charles Mewès assisted by Émile Widmann. In 1928, it participated through its local branch in the creation of the Luxembourg Stock Exchange.

The financial stresses that started in the late 1920s led to the demise of the SGAB's main local competitors: the Banque de Mulhouse was absorbed in 1929 into the Crédit Commercial de France; the Comptoir d'Escompte de Mulhouse was absorbed in 1930 by its former subsidiary the Banque Nationale de Crédit, itself soon restructured into Banque Nationale pour le Commerce et l'Industrie; and the Banque d'Alsace et de Lorraine was absorbed in 1931 into the CIC network as Crédit Industriel d'Alsace et de Lorraine (CIAL). The SGAB was not spared and closed most of its German network in the wake of the crisis of 1931. After 1933, the SGAB closed its last branches in Germany.

During World War II, like other Alsatian banks the SGAB relocated, to Sainte-Marie-aux-Mines in 1939 then to Périgueux in 1940, and was cut off from its operations except the branch in Zurich. Under the authority of the Bankenkommissar appointed by the Reich authorities in annexed Alsace–Lorraine, ten Alsatian branches were transferred to the Bank of Baden, and operated under the name Badische-Elssässische Bankgesellschaft while the bank's operations in Lorraine were liquidated. The 12 branches that the SGAB operated in Luxembourg were similarly closed by the German occupation authorities, with its accounts being taken over by the Banque Internationale à Luxembourg.

=== Postwar era and absorption into Société Générale ===
The SGAB recovered its operations following the liberation of France and soon also restarted a network in Germany and the Saar Protectorate, opening branches in Kehl, Offenburg, Cologne as well as Saarbrücken, practically the only foreign bank with retail presence in Germany until the early 1970s. In 1956, it reopened a branch in Luxembourg.

In Alsace, the SGAB expanded dynamically in the postwar era, becoming the leading bank in the region. A division of labor of sorts emerged, under which the SGAB was preeminent in financing large enterprises whereas the CIAL focused more on financing smaller and medium-sized businesses. In 1968, it inaugurated a new head office building in the outskirts of Strasbourg at 253-255, route de Mittelhausbergen in Oberhausbergen, designed by architects Charles-Gustave Stoskopf and Walter Oehler.

Even after the 1955 rebranding, the bank remained widely referred to as SGAB (rather than Sogenal) well into the 1960s.

In the 1970s, the Sogenal further expanded internationally. It opened a branch in Geneva in 1970 and a subsidiary in Vienna in 1972. In 1975 it absorbed the Société Française de Banque et de Dépôts, the Société Générale's longstanding Belgian subsidiary in which it had held a 20 percent stake since 1924, and opened a representative office in East Berlin. It then (re-)established itself in Düsseldorf in 1976, Munich in 1977, and Hamburg in 1979. In 1981, it acquired Luxbanque, a private bank in Luxembourg. by then, the Société Générale held 42 percent of the Sogenal's equity.

The remaining 58 percent of Sogenal's equity was nationalized together with the rest of the French banking sector in 1982. In 1985, the Société Générale's stake was raised to 52 percent. Starting in 1987, the Société Générale also started acquiring equity of the Sogenal on the stock market, culminating in a squeeze-out in 1995. In 1995–1996, Société Générale then merged the Sogenal branches in Luxembourg and Switzerland with Luxbanque into a new Luxembourg entity called Societe Generale Bank & Trust (SGBT), thus ending the Sogenal's presence outside France. In 2001, the Sogenal was legally merged into its parent and its 102 branches were correspondingly rebranded.

== Leadership ==
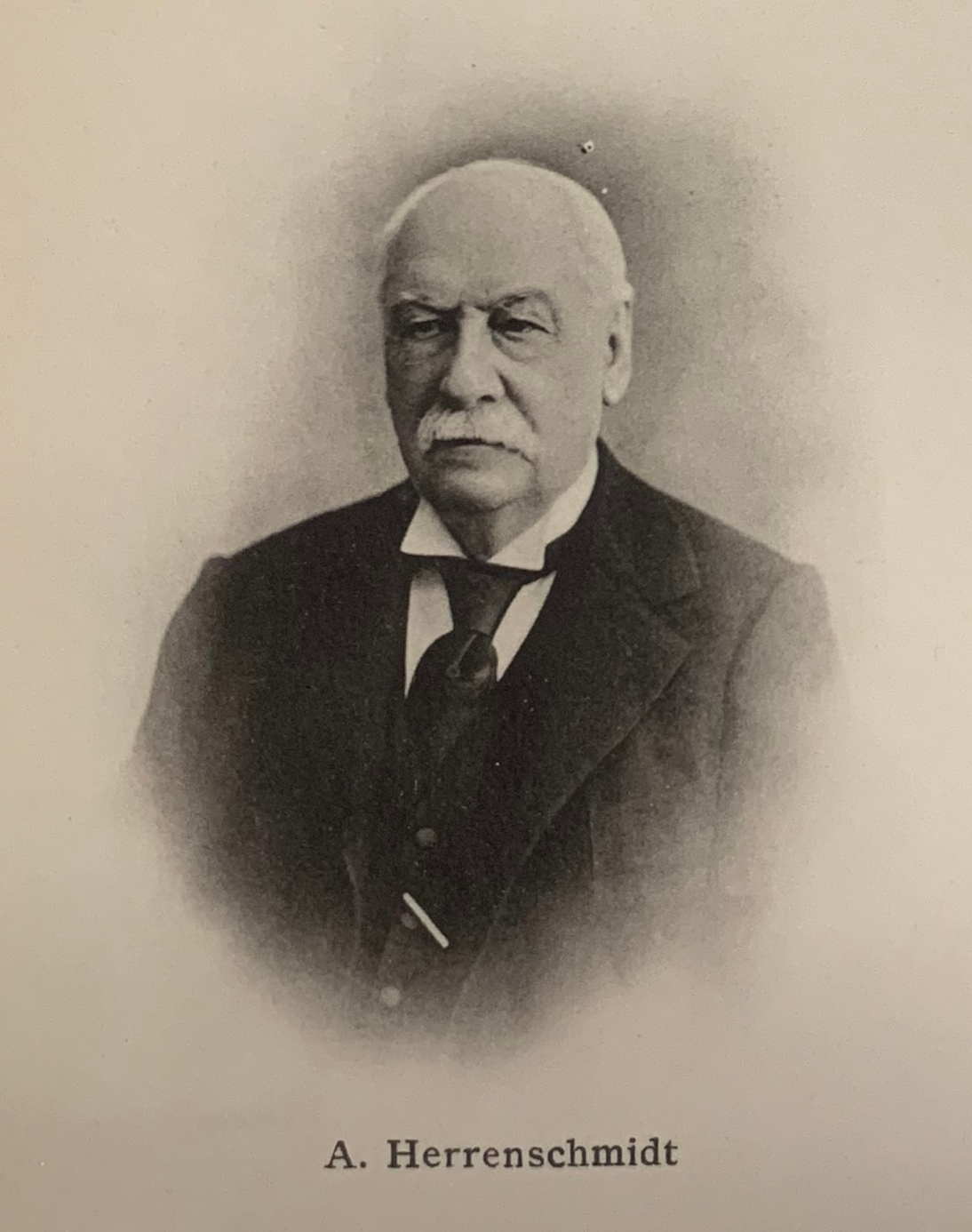
Alfred Herrenschmidt (1828–1917), first chairman of the SGAB

=== Chairmen ===
- Alfred Herrenschmidt, chairman of the management board 1881–1898, then of the supervisory board 1898-1917
- Léon Ungemach, 1917-1928
- Fernand Herrenschmidt, 1928-1938
- René Debrix, 1938-1955
- Julien Chadenet, 1955-1965
- Henri Blanchenay, 1965-1968
- Guillaume Labadens, 1969-1977
- Jean-Paul Delacour, 1978-1982
- René Géronimus, 1985-1992

=== Chief executives ===
- Joachim Bruel, administrateur délégué 1881-1891
- Louis Delorme, administrateur délégué 1891-1896
- Henri Kling, directeur général 1897-1907
- Eugène Ruedolf, 1908-1921
- Joseph Schwartz, 1914-1927
- René Debrix, 1919-1934
- Charles Donati, 1934-1940
- Albert Erhet, 1945-1954
- Guillaume Labadens, 1954-1968
- Frédéric Rauch, 1969-1976
- René Geronimus, 1976
- Michel Wilhelm, 1976-1984

== See also ==
- List of banks in France
- List of banks in Luxembourg
