= Société Marseillaise de Crédit =

Société Marseillaise de Crédit (SMC) is a bank in France.

== History ==
The Société Marseillaise de Crédit was created in 1865 by Joseph Grandval, Victor Roux, Albert Rostand and Armand Bergasse. Its first chairman was Jean-Baptiste Pastré. In 1880, its headquarters was built in Marseille by Léon Verdier. Its first neighbourhood branch was opened in 1909.

In 1913, it bought Banque du Sud-Est and the Comptoir Commercial d'Escompte du Midi, thus expanding all over Alpes-Maritimes, Hérault, Gard, Vaucluse, Drôme, Aveyron, Pyrénées Orientales and Aude. In 1919, it spread to Tunisia, Algeria and Morocco. In the 1940s, it invested in businesses such as Noilly-Prat, Raffineries Saint-Louis, EDF, and SNCF.

In 1956, it opened branches in trucks, thus reaching more customers. In 1968, it opened its first ATMs. In 1982, it was nationalised. It was on the Minitel in 1983, and its website was set up in 1995.

Between 1989 and 1992, Denis Bonnasse sold his brokerage firm to Société Marseillaise de Crédit, which transferred control of the Marseille-based brokerage firm Blisson Bonnasse to Banque Pallas.

In 1998, it was privatised again and bought by the Crédit Commercial de France, owned by HSBC. In 2001, online banking was added to the website. In 2008, it was bought by Banque Populaire.

It was sold to Crédit du Nord (a member of the Société Générale group) in 2010. Since then, all Credit du Nord agencies in the south of France became Société Marseillaise de Crédit, and the northern agencies of SMC are now Crédit du Nord.

The first cash dispenser in France was opened in Marseilles at the head office of SMC in 1968.
