= Banque Extérieure d'Algérie =

Banque extérieure d'Algérie
- Company type: Joint-stock company
- Traded as: SGBV: BEA
- Industry: Banking
- Founded: 1 October 1967
- Headquarters: 42 rue des Frères Bouadou, Bir Mourad Raïs, Algiers, Algeria
- Key people: Houari Rahali, chairman of the board; Lahouari Rahali, director-general since April 2024
- Total assets: US$34 billion (2024)
- Owner: Government of Algeria (100%)
- Number of employees: 3,961 (2022)
- Website: www.bea.dz
- Footnotes / references Bank code: BEXADZAL

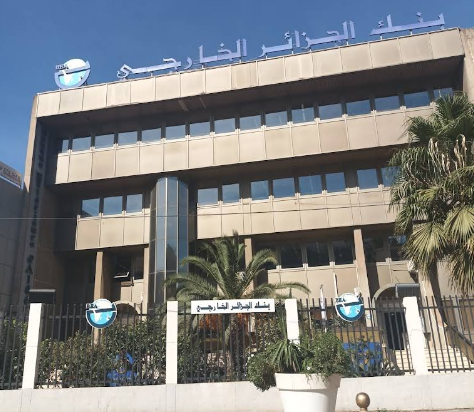
Banque Extérieure d'Algérie

Banque extérieure d'Algérie (BEA; Arabic: بنك الجزائر الخارجي) is an Algerian public bank. Established in 1967, it is based in Bir Mourad Raïs, Algeria.

== History ==
Banque extérieure d'Algérie was established on 1 October 1967 by Ordinance No. 67-204 as a national company.

In 1970, all foreign banking operations carried out by Algeria’s most important national companies were entrusted to BEA.

In 1989, the bank changed its legal status and became a joint-stock company, while retaining its original purpose.

In 2008, Banque extérieure d'Algérie was ranked as the leading bank in the Maghreb and placed sixth in the ranking of the top 200 African banks published by Jeune Afrique.

In 2011, BEA opened the first self-service banking branch in Algeria and reported share capital of 76 billion Algerian dinars.

Saïd Kessasra was appointed president and chief executive officer of BEA in June 2016, replacing Mohamed Loukal.

In January 2017, Kessasra was dismissed and replaced on an interim basis by B. Semid, BEA’s director-general for credit.

In February 2017, the bank’s management announced that it intended to open branches in France by the end of 2017.

In 2019, BEA increased its share capital from 150 billion dinars to 230 billion dinars. The capital increase formed part of a strategy for international development.

== Structure ==
In 2022, BEA had a network of 106 branches across Algeria, including two exchange offices, as well as 11 regional directorates.

== See also ==
- List of largest banks in Africa
- Economy of Algeria

== Bibliography ==
=== General works ===
- KPMG (2012). Guide des banques et des établissements financiers (PDF) (in French). Paris: Editions Ellipses. p. 112. ISBN 978-9947-8-0708-8.

=== Theses ===
- Berrahi, Kheir-Eddine (2006). Étude et analyse de la distribution des crédits aux entreprises: étude de cas, la B.E.A (PDF) (Thesis) (in French). Tlemcen: Université Abou Bekr Belkaid Tlemcen.
- Zourdani, Safia (2012). Le financement des opérations du commerce extérieur en Algérie: cas de la B.N.A. (PDF) (Thesis) (in French). Tizi Ouzou: Université Mouloud Mammeri de Tizi Ouzou.
