= Banque de Baecque Beau =

French bank

The Banque de Baecque Beau was a French bank that now is subsumed in HSBC France. In 1837, two traders, Camille Cailliez and Charles de Baecque, established a partnership to engage in negotiating commissions on merchandise and in banking affairs. In 1846 the partners brought in Alexis Beau and began operating under the name Cailliez, de Baecque et Beau. The partnership narrowed its focus to banking activities, primarily discount transactions. Its name changed once again in the 19th century, to Banque de Baecque, Beau et Lantin, when it added Maurice Lantin as a partner.

After World War II the bank adopted the name Banque de Baecque Beau (BBB).

In 1991, Banque Hervet acquired a 67% stake in Banque de Baecque Beau. Under the terms of the agreement, the Baecque and Beau families sold their combined 55% stake to Hervet, and L'Lione Finance saw its stake in the bank fall to 33% with the sale to Hervet of a 12% stake. In addition, Christian de Baecque agreed to remain president of the bank.

A few years later, BBB bought out a number of client portfolios, most notably those of Citibank in 1996 and Banque Monod (originally Monod Française de Banque) in 1997, the latter from Suez Lyonnaise des Eaux. In 1997, it also absorbed the Société Parisienne de Banque.

== See also ==
- List of banks in France
