= Crédit Commercial de France =

French bank, formerly part of HSBC (2000–2023)

- Company type: Private
- Industry: Banking
- Founded: 1894 as Banque Suisse et Française
- Headquarters: Paris, France
- Total assets: €31,412 billion (Q2 2025)

The Crédit Commercial de France (French pronunciation: [kʁedi kɔmɛʁsjal də fʁɑ̃s], "Commercial Credit [Company] of France", abbr. CCF) is a commercial bank in France, founded in 1894 as the Banque Suisse et Française and renamed to CCF in 1917. By the end of the 1920s, it had grown to be the seventh-largest bank in France. Its brand was eclipsed between 2005 and 2022 under HSBC ownership, but is set to be revived by the bank's new owner Cerberus Capital Management.

== History ==
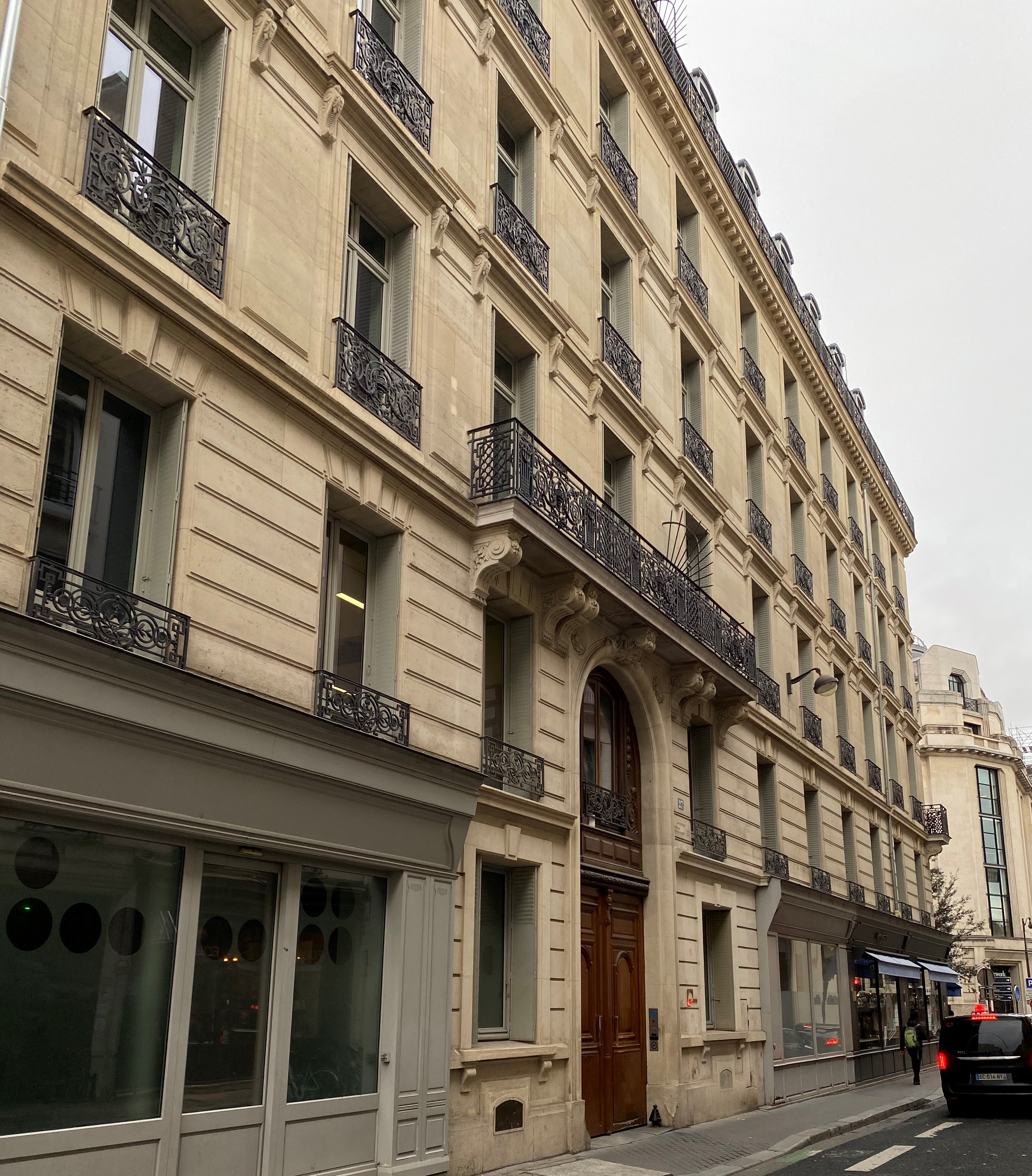
First head office of BSF at 27, rue Laffitte in Paris

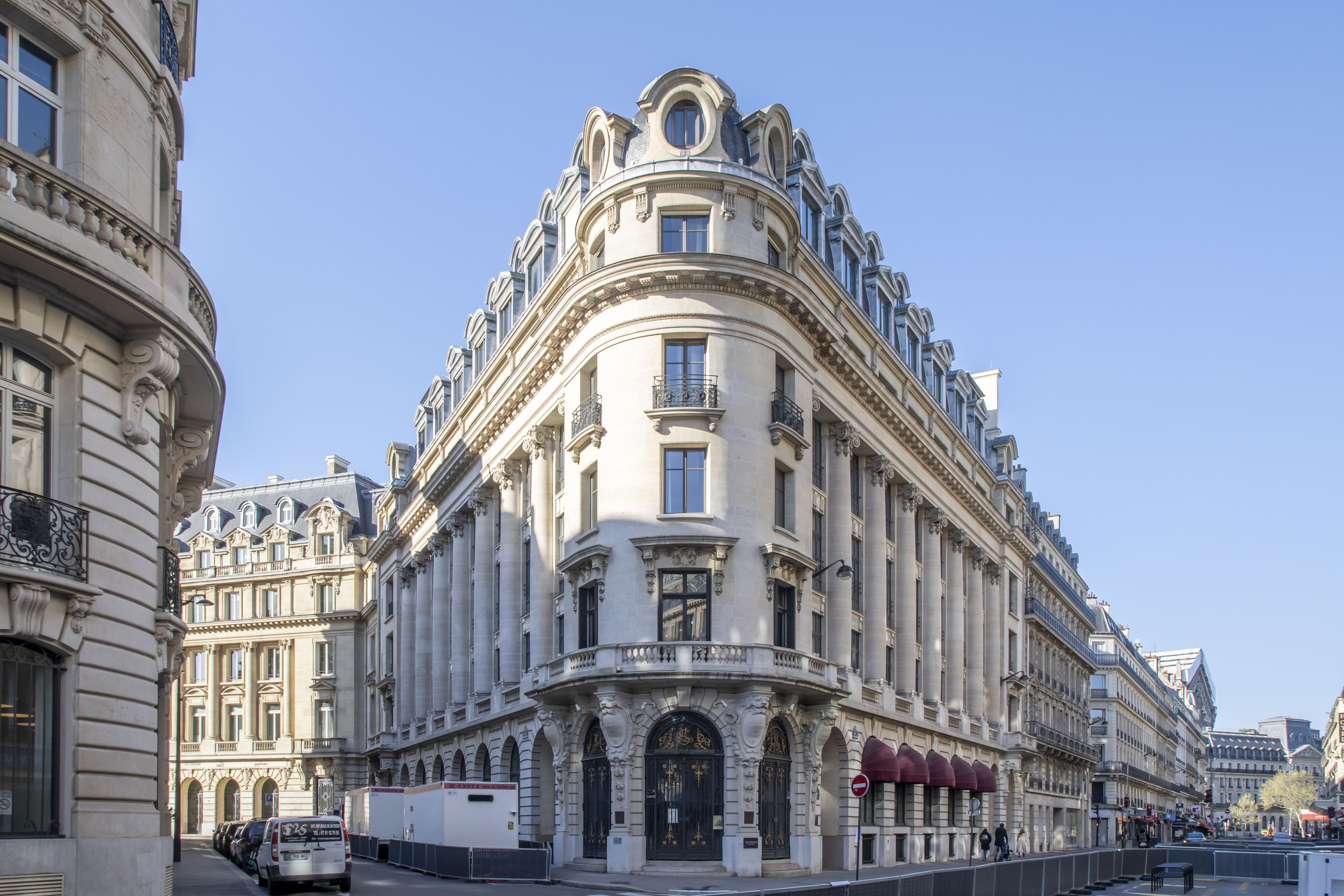
Head office of BSF, then of CCF from 1908 to 1922 at 20, rue La Fayette in Paris

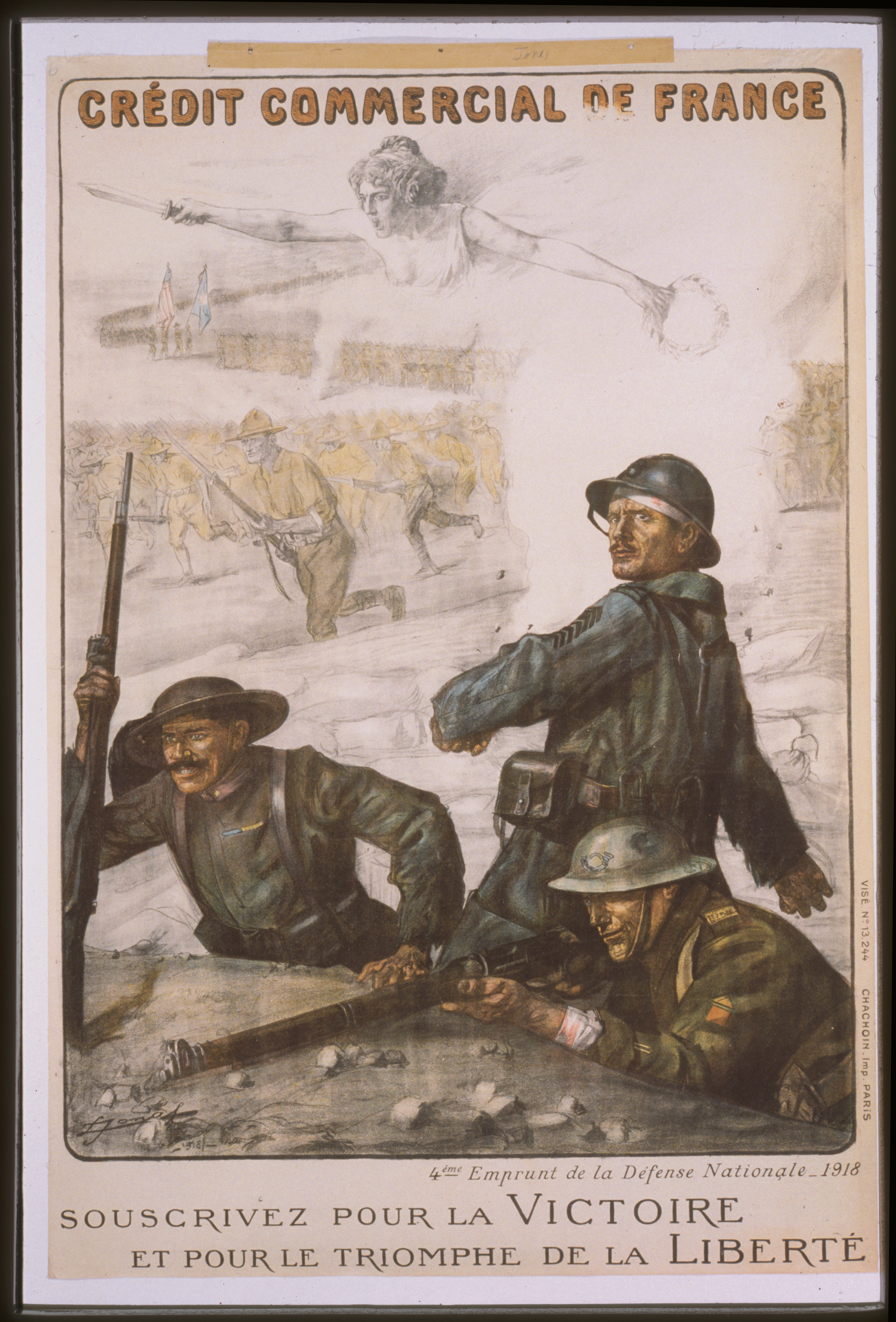
Wartime advertising of CCF, 1918

Logo of HSBC CCF between 2000 and 2005

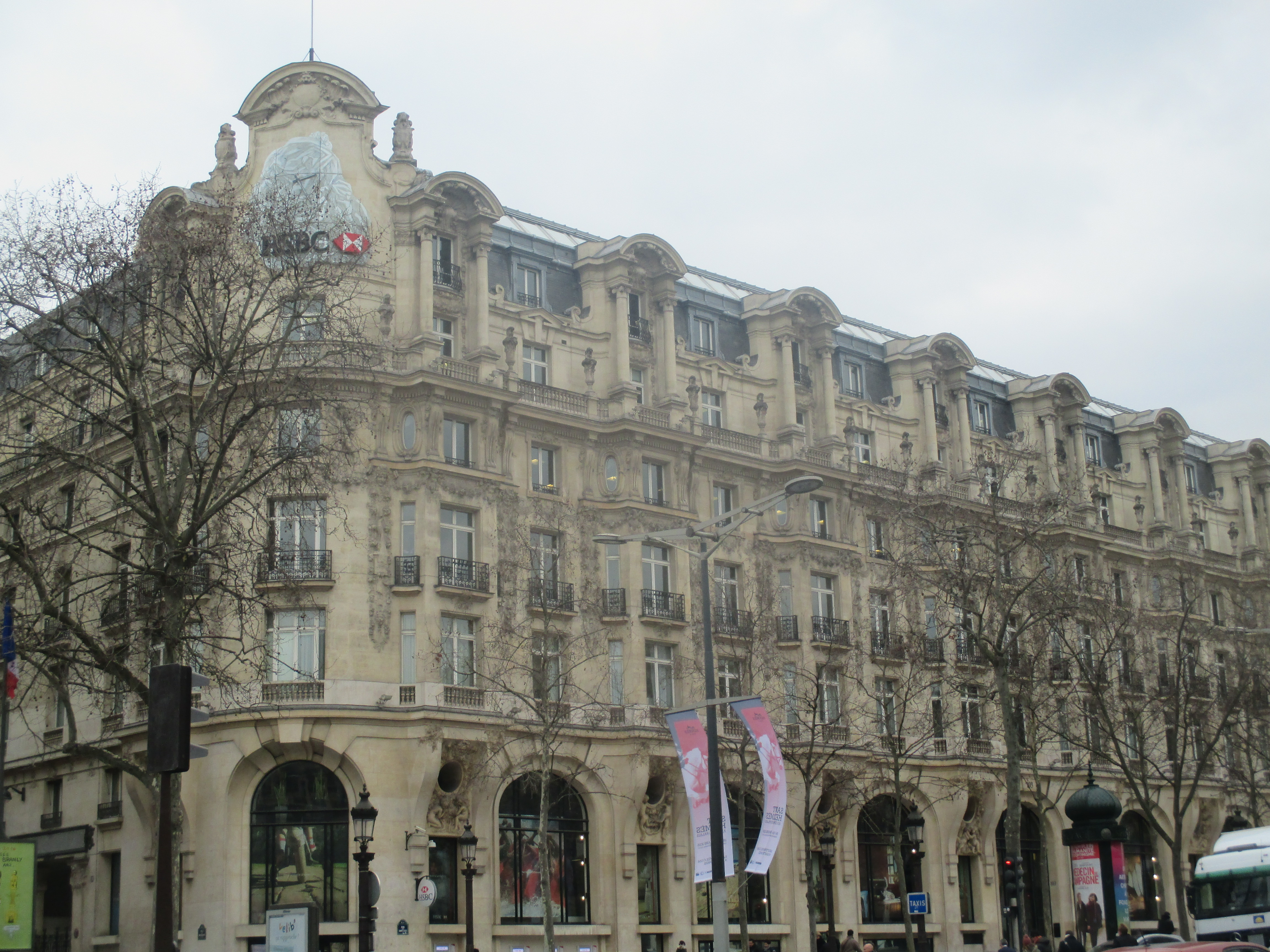
Head office of CCF, then HSBC France from 1922 to 2020 at 103, Champs Elysées in Paris

=== Banque Suisse et Française ===
Financiers Ernest Méjà and Benjamin Rossier founded the Banque Suisse et Française (BSF, "Swiss and French Bank") at 27, rue Laffite in Paris, on 1 July 1894. They had previously worked together for the Swiss Banque Fédérale S.A., whose Paris branch formed the initial core of the new venture. Méjà remained as joint managing director of the bank with Rossier until his death in 1910. Rossier then continued to run the bank until his retirement in 1936.

From its early days, the BSF took an active interest in commerce and industry. A successful working relationship was developed with the Paris department store Galeries Lafayette. The bank also helped fund the construction of the new Paris Métro and the installation of public lighting in the capital. The early success of the business led to considerable expansion. The number of employees rose tenfold by the turn of the century. From 1912, the bank began to develop a branch network, with 14 offices opening in Paris and the first provincial office in Lille. An office was also acquired in Marseille when the business of that city's Banque du Colombier was taken over in 1914.

=== Crédit Commercial de France ===
In January 1917, the BSF’s shareholders approved a proposed merger with two regional banks, Maison Aynard et Fils in Lyon and Caisse de Crédit de Nice. Aynard had started out as a drapers’ company in the early 18th century, before turning to banking in 1858. Established in 1865, Caisse de Crédit de Nice had opened several branches along the French Riviera and in Italy. The merged entity adopted the name Crédit Commercial de France. Two years later, it acquired the business of Banque de Bordeaux. It went on to purchase other banks, not least the Banque de Mulhouse in 1928-1929. By the end of the 1920s, had become the sixth-largest bank in France.

In the 1960s, during the chairmanship of Jacques Merlin, CCF embarked upon a policy of further expansion, with the number of branches rising to more than 200. The bank's industrial affairs department and international department were also founded during this period. In 1979, it launched a long-running advertising campaign under the motto "The Bank of success", which boosted the number of shareholders from 17,000 to 34,000.

In 1982, the CCF was nationalised by the French government. In 1987, following a change of political majority, the CCF was privatised again. CCF also acquired Banque Chaix in the 1980s. By the end of the 20th century, CCF was operating with 650 branches and assets of €69 billion.

=== Integration into HSBC ===
In April 2000, HSBC announced its intention to acquire the CCF and the transaction was completed in July. That month, HSBC Holdings plc was listed on the Paris Stock Exchange for the first time. Under HSBC ownership, CCF continued to expand with the purchase of Banque Pelletier in 2000 and Banque Hervet in 2001.

CCF rebranded HSBC France on 1 November 2005, thus phasing out its own brand as well as the group's other remaining brands including Union de banques à Paris, Banque de Picardie, Banque de Baecque Beau, and Banque Hervet.

=== Brand revival under new ownership ===
In June 2021, private equity investors Cerberus Capital Management announced their plan to acquire HSBC Continental Europe's French retail operations together with the CCF brand, and merge them with their existing French bank My Money Bank, aiming to "build on CCF's legacy and re-establish the brand as a leading franchise for wealth management customers in France."

== Leadership ==
The following individuals were Chair (or Chair & CEO) of the BSF, then CCF until absorption by HSBC:

- Alexandre Halet: 1894-1902
- Théodore Faverger: 1902-1904
- Adolphe Salles: 1904-1924
- Maurice Koechlin: 1925-1926
- Georges Siegfried: 1926-1940
- Jean Davillier: 1940-1941
- Georges Painvin: 1941-1944
- Jean Davillier: 1944-1958
- Raymond Merckling: 1958-1960
- Jacques Merlin: 1961-1976
- Jean-Maxime Lévêque: 1976-1982
- Guy Raoul-Duval: 1982
- Daniel Deguen: 1982-1984
- Claude Jouven: 1984-1985
- Gabriel Pallez: 1985-1987
- Michel Pébereau: 1987-1993
- Charles de Croisset: 1993-2004
- Charles-Henri Filippi: 2004-2007

After absorption into HSBC, Peter Boyles became CEO of HSBC France. Since the 2024 spinoff, CCF has again had its own governance:

- Niccolò Ubertalli, CEO since 2024

== Paris head office ==
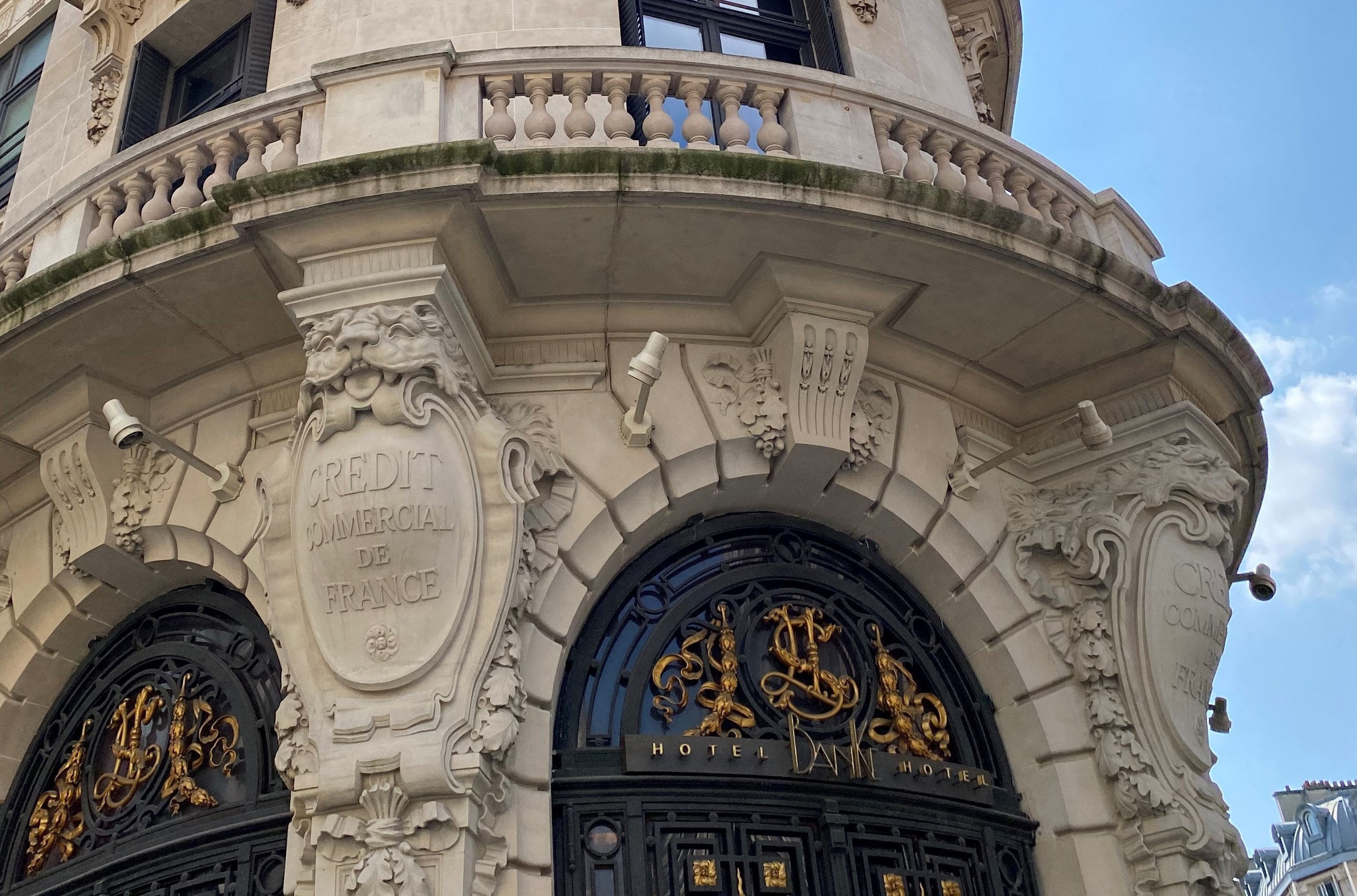
Detail of former CCF head office building at 20, rue Lafayette

The BSF started the activity in rented offices at 27, rue Laffitte, in a new (1891) building on the former location of Jacques Laffitte's mansion, next door to the Paris head office of the Rothschild family bank at numbers 19-25. It then commissioned a new head office at 20, rue Lafayette, designed by architects Joseph Cassien-Bernard and Paul Friesé, and completed in 1908. In 2009, that building was remodeled by Spanish entrepreneur Jordi Clos as the Hôtel Banke.

In 1922, the CCF moved its head office to the prominent building at 103, Champs-Elysées, previously the Elysée Palace Hotel designed by architect Georges Chedanne, built by the Compagnie Internationale des Grands Hotels and opened on 10 May 1899 ahead of the Exposition Universelle of 1900. The luxury hotel had closed in the financial turmoil following World War I. The CCF, then HSBC France stayed there until 2020. It was then announced that the property, owned by Qatar since 2010, would be repurposed to become the Parisian flagship store of Christian Dior.

Since its revival as spin-off from HSBC, the CCF has had its registered head office in the business center at 103, rue de Grenelle in central Paris.

== See also ==
- List of banks in France
- List of banks in the euro area
