= Banque Nationale d'Algérie =

Banque Nationale d’Algérie
- Native name: البنك الوطني الجزائري
- Company type: State-owned enterprise
- Founded: 1966
- Headquarters: Algiers, Algeria
- Total assets: US$41 billion (2024)
- Owner: Government of Algeria
- Number of employees: c. 6,000
- Website: www.bna.dz

Banque Nationale d’Algérie (BNA; Arabic: البنك الوطني الجزائري) is a state-owned commercial bank headquartered in Algiers. It is one of the leading banks in Algeria and plays an important role in the country’s financial system. The bank provides financial services to private customers, companies and public institutions, and is particularly active in the financing of industry, agriculture and foreign trade. With total assets of US$41 billion in 2024, it ranked among the ten largest banks in Africa.

== History ==
Banque Nationale d’Algérie was founded in 1966, a few years after Algerian independence, and took over the activities of the colonial-era Crédit foncier d'Algérie et de Tunisie. Its establishment formed part of the Algerian government’s economic policy strategy to build a national banking system and support the financing of the state-directed economy. This included, for example, the financing of agriculture and the rural economy, a function which from 1982 was transferred to the specialized banking institution BADR. With the gradual liberalization of the Algerian economy from the 1990s onward, the banking system was also reformed. In this context, BNA modernized its structures and activities while retaining a leading role in the national economy.

In 2020, Banque Nationale d’Algérie became the first Algerian state-owned bank to introduce Islamic banking. This activity proved successful, and in 2025 the bank planned to establish a dedicated subsidiary for Islamic finance.

== Profile ==
In 2025, BNA managed more than 2.8 million customer accounts. At the same time, the bank operated 231 branches, supervised by 22 regional offices across Algeria, as well as nearly 300 automated teller machines. The bank has increasingly invested in digitalization and electronic banking services, and had gained 137,453 e-banking subscribers.

== Ownership ==
Banque Nationale d’Algérie is wholly owned by the Algerian state. It is supervised by Algeria’s central bank, the Bank of Algeria.
