= Algiers Stock Exchange =

Stock exchange market founded in 1997 in Algeria

- La Bourse d'Algérie بورصة الجزائر
- Type: Stock exchange
- Location: Algiers, Algeria
- Founded: May 25, 1997; 28 years ago
- Key people: Yazid Benmouhoub (CEO)
- Currency: DZD
- No. of listings: 6
- Market cap: US$3,937,795,681
- Indices: Dzair Index
- Website: sgbv.dz

The Society of Stock Exchange Management (in French: Société de gestion de la bourse des valeurs; SGBV) is the only stock exchange of Algeria. It is in operation since 1997. Despite a 62% increase over one year, SGBV remains one of the smallest stock exchanges in the world since 2011.

== History ==
=== The first attempt ===
The idea of creating a stock exchange in Algiers appeared in 1990 as part of the economic reforms of 1988. It is established by law:

- 88-01 on the orientation of EPA (Economic Public Enterprises)
- 88-03 with formation of 8 funds for participation
- 88-04 amending and supplementing the Ordinance 59-75 of 26/09/1975 on the Code of Commerce

These laws introduced the distinction between state ownership and state public authorities.

In 1990, the company was incorporated securities (SVM), its capital is held by the fund 8 to participate. Its capital in 1992 rose to 9.32 million DA in the same year its name was changed as well and became "Securities Exchange (BVM)." In the absence of specific laws and code of commerce suitable for the market economy has been able to exercise the stock market.

=== Laws related to the stock exchange ===
- Decree law 93-08 of 25 April 1993 amending and supplementing Ordinance 75-59 of 26 September 1975 concerning the Commercial Code:
  - Introduction of the possibility of formation of joint-stock company with a public call for the savings
  - Definition of securities as joint stock companies listed, or may be, may issue
- Ordinance 96-27 of 9 December 1996 amending and supplementing Ordinance 75-59 of 26 September 1975 on the Commercial Code: This order defined the rules of operation of various commercial companies.
- Decree Law 93-10 of 23 May 1993 to:
  - established the stock exchange
  - defined as the stock market: the context of organization and conduct of operations on securities issued by the State, other legal persons of public law as well as corporations
  - agencies set up the stock exchange:
    - Organising Committee and a Monitoring and Exchange constitutes the authority of the securities market
    - a management company of the Stock Exchange: the market operator
    - a Central Securities Depository Clearing Denommé Algeria, joint stock company with capital of DZD 240 million held by banks and listed companies. Clearing Algeria was born in 2001 and began operations in 2004 (www.algerieclearing.dz)
    - intermediaries and Exchange: investment firms
- Law 95-22 of 26 August 1995 on the privatization of public enterprises as amended and supplemented by Ordinance 97-12 of 19 March 1997 brought the action mechanisms of the stock exchange as a form of privatization
- Law 95-25 of 25 September 1995 on the management of merchant capital of the state has set specific rules for the organization, management and control of public funds held by the State in the form of securities representing the capital
- May 23, 1993, Creation of the regulator is the market COSOB (Organising Committee and Securities and Exchange Surveillance)

=== Actual start of the Algiers Stock Exchange ===
- May 25, 1997, with the formation of SGBV shareholders six public banks (BDL, BEA, BADR, CPA, BNA and CNEP)
- 13 September 1999, the first listing on the stock exchange of Algiers with state-owned food ERIAD Setif, which opens 20% of its capital.
- 20 September 1999, the pharmaceutical public SAIDAL is next in turn to the exchange of Algiers.
- 14 February 2000, the HGE Aurassi, manager of the hotel public Aurassi also between the Algiers Stock Exchange.
- 7 March 2011, Alliance Insurance, ten years after the last introduction, become the first private company to Algerian its IPO, the title will be next in February 2011.
- On April 7, 2013, NCA Rouiba opened its capital before withdrawing in 2020, after a crisis within the group, leading to its takeover by the French company Castel.
- On January 18, 2016, the private pharmaceutical group Biopharm put up for sale a total of 5,104,375 ordinary shares, representing a share of 20% of its share capital.
- Until 2024 Biopharm had the biggest capitalisation of the stock exchange with more than 400 millions $. From 2024, two national banks (the Local Development Bank and the Crédit populaire d'Algérie) are supposed to list on the main market "dzair index". This action takes place following the government's desire to boost the financial market.
- Tuesday March 26, 2024, and for the first time a bank is listed on the Algiers stock exchange: Crédit populaire d'Algérie. The sale of shares took place from January 30 to March 14, 2024, it covered 30% (60 million shares) of the total capital of the company for a nominal price of 2,300 dzd per share, this sale of shares was achieved at a very appreciable rate of 80% representing 49 million shares (24.48% of the company's share capital) equivalent to a value of 112 billion dzd/ $820 million. The entry into the stock market of this bank allowed the overall capitalization of the Algiers stock exchange to increase from 72 billion dzd ($534 million) to approximately 532 billion dzd (more than $3.9 billion).
- During a press conference with the newspaper acharq-business (bloomberg), the general director of the stock exchange Mr Benmouhoub, announced the IPO of the BDL and Djezzy in 2024, which according to his calculations would allow to reach a capitalization of $7 billion. The objective would then be to progress with around two introductions on average per year. Still according to him the objective would be to reach a capitalization of $10 billion by 2027

== Taxation ==
The Finance Act of 2009 exempts from tax the proceeds of securities and shares of total income tax for a period of five years. The Finance Act 2004 provides for an exemption from IRB (tax on income and profits) and IBS (tax on company profits) on income from securities listed or traded on an organized market for a period of five years with effect from 1 January 2009. The level of transaction in the stock market remains relatively low, it does not cover the costs of the institution market.

== Trading times ==
Trading takes place three times a week from 9:30 to 11:00 for shares and corporate bonds, and from Sunday to Thursday for OAT (Treasury bonds):

- Pre-open: 09:00 to 09:30
- Open: 10:00 to 10:15
- Check-ups and fixing: 10:15 to 10:30
- Submission of blocks: 10:30 to 11:00
- Close: 11:00

These times exclude public holidays.

== List of the stock market brokers ==
- CNEP bank
- BNA
- CPA
- BADR
- BDL
- BEA
- Al Salam bank
- Al baraka bank
- Societe general (Algeria)
- Invest market
- TELL Markets

== Index ==
Dzair Index

PME index (small and medium corporations)

== See also ==
- List of African stock exchanges
