= Crédit du Nord =

French retail banking network

- Type: Société Anonyme
- Industry: Banking
- Predecessor: Banque Générale du Nord; Banque de l'Union Parisienne
- Founded: 1848; 178 years ago
- Defunct: January 1, 2023
- Fate: Merged with Société Générale
- Successor: Société Générale
- Parent: Société Générale Société
- Website: www.credit-du-nord.fr

Crédit du Nord (French pronunciation: [kʁedi dy nɔʁ]) was a French retail banking network. It consisted of the following banks:

- Banque Courtois, Toulouse, Aquitaine (oldest existing bank in France, founded in 1760)
- Banque Kolb, Alsace, Lorraine
- Banque Laydernier, Savoy
- Banque Nuger, Massif Central
- Banque Rhône-Alpes, Lyon
- Banque Tarneaud, Limoges
- Société Marseillaise de Crédit, Marseille
- Crédit du Nord itself in the rest of France
- Gilbert Dupont, a stock brokerage firm

Crédit du Nord is fully owned by Société Générale. Crédit du Nord specialises on professionals and small business. It serves about 1.5 million customers in more than 700 stores (2006).

== History ==
Crédit du Nord started in Lille in 1848. After buying a number of small banks, it was, in turn, acquired by Paribas between 1972 (35% owned) and 1988 (100% owned) but remained run as a separate network. In the following years several regional French banks were brought in the group while retaining their names.

In 1984, it was the fifth-ranking French banking group. It rebranded itself, after working with Creative Business (a public relations company), with a new logo, graphics of its name, the architecture of its branches, and public relations. It changed its logo from an orange cube to a blue star.

In 1997, the whole Crédit du Nord network with the associated banks was acquired by Société Générale from Paribas. Since 2000, Crédit du Nord is 80% owned by Société Générale and 20% by Dexia.

A full merger with Société Générale was achieved 1 January 2023.

The customer-facing SG Crédit du Nord (SG meaning Société Générale) brand is applied to both the former Crédit du Nord, and the Société Générale branches in the North of France.

As with SG Crédit du Nord, the remaining Crédit du Nord banks' identities are also applied as regional brand names:

- SG Tarneaud in Centre-Val de Loire and in parts of Nouvelle-Aquitaine (the remaining of the branches in Nouvelle-Aquitaine are named SG Sud-Ouest)
- SG Courtois in Occitanie
- SG SMC (for Société Marseillaise de Crédit) in Provence-Alpes-Côte d'Azur
- SG Laydernier in parts of Auvergne-Rhône-Alpes (the remaining of the branches in Auvergne-Rhône-Alpes are named SG Auvergne-Rhône-Alpes)

== Controversy ==
In 2010, the French government's Autorité de la concurrence (the department in charge of regulating competition) fined eleven banks, including Crédit du Nord, the sum of €384,900,000 for colluding to charge unjustified fees on check processing, especially for extra fees charged during the transition from paper check transfer to "Exchanges Check-Image" electronic transfer.
