= Banque de l'Indochine =

Defunct French colonial bank

Bank of Indochina
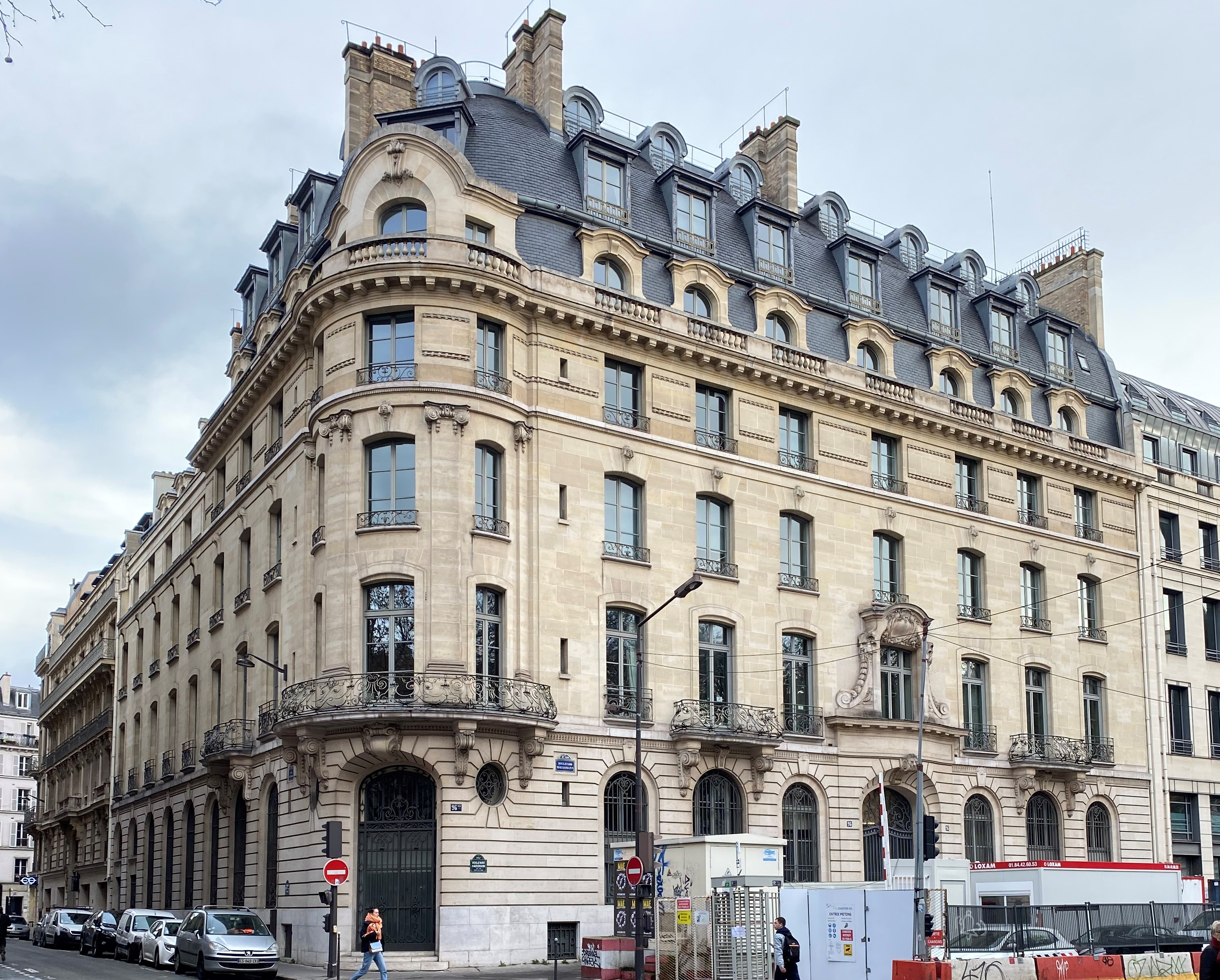
- Headquarters building in Paris (completed 1922), 96 boulevard Haussmann
- Native name: Banque de l'Indochine
- Industry: financial service activities, except insurance and pension funding
- Predecessor: Banque Industrielle de Chine
- Founded: 21 January 1875
- Defunct: 1975
- Successor: Banque Indosuez

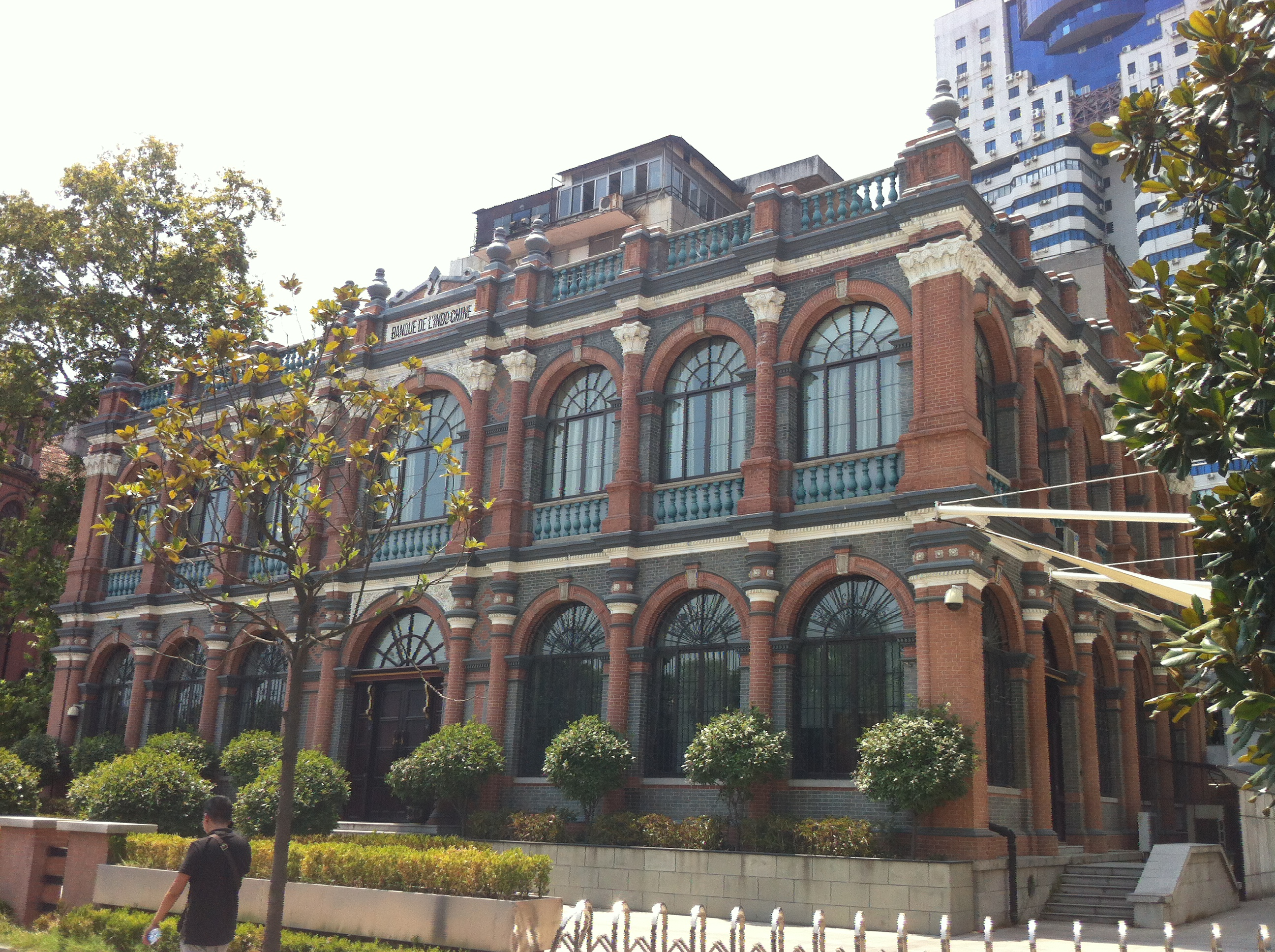
Office in Hankou (completed 1902), now part of Wuhan

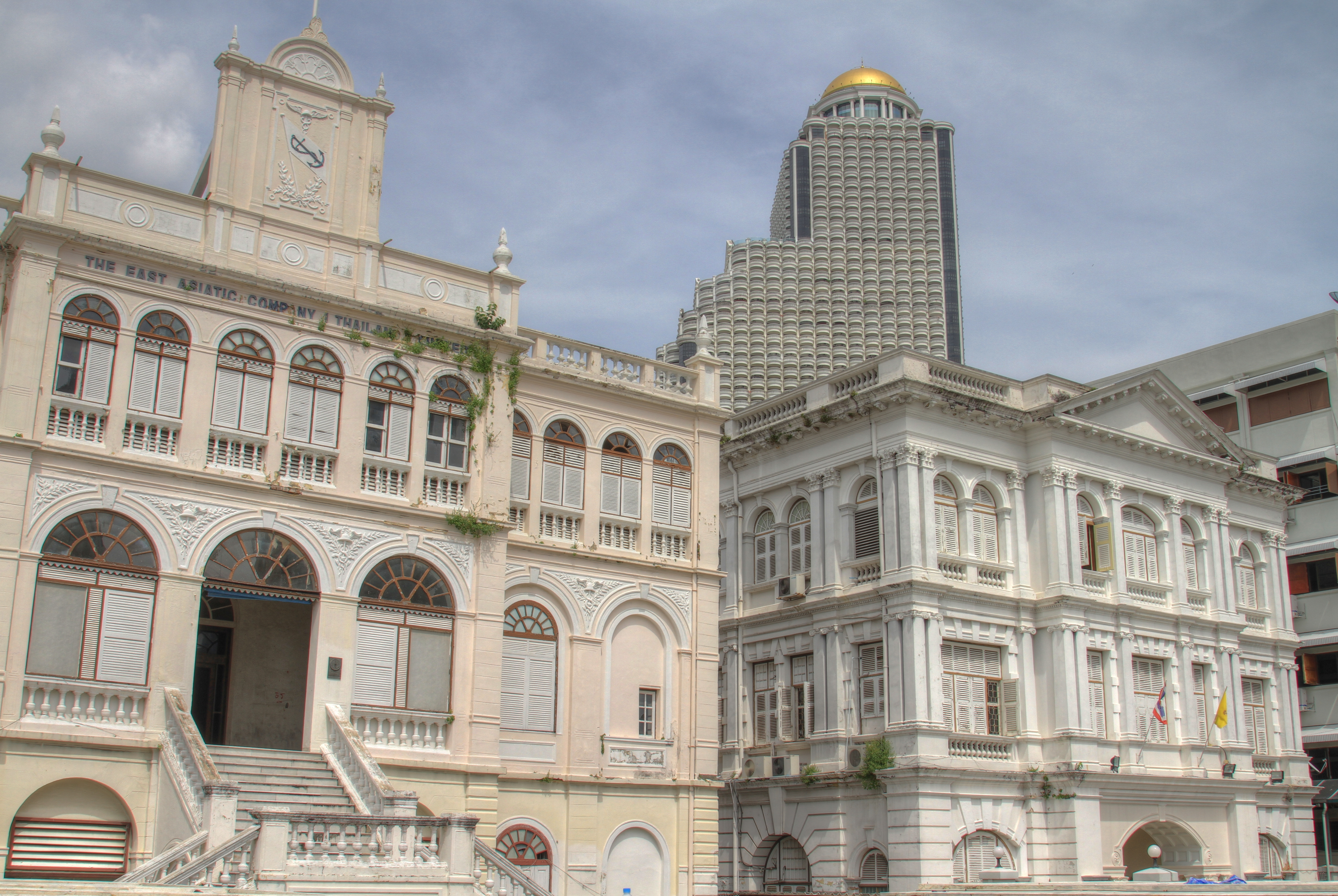
Branch building in Bangkok (completed 1908, right)

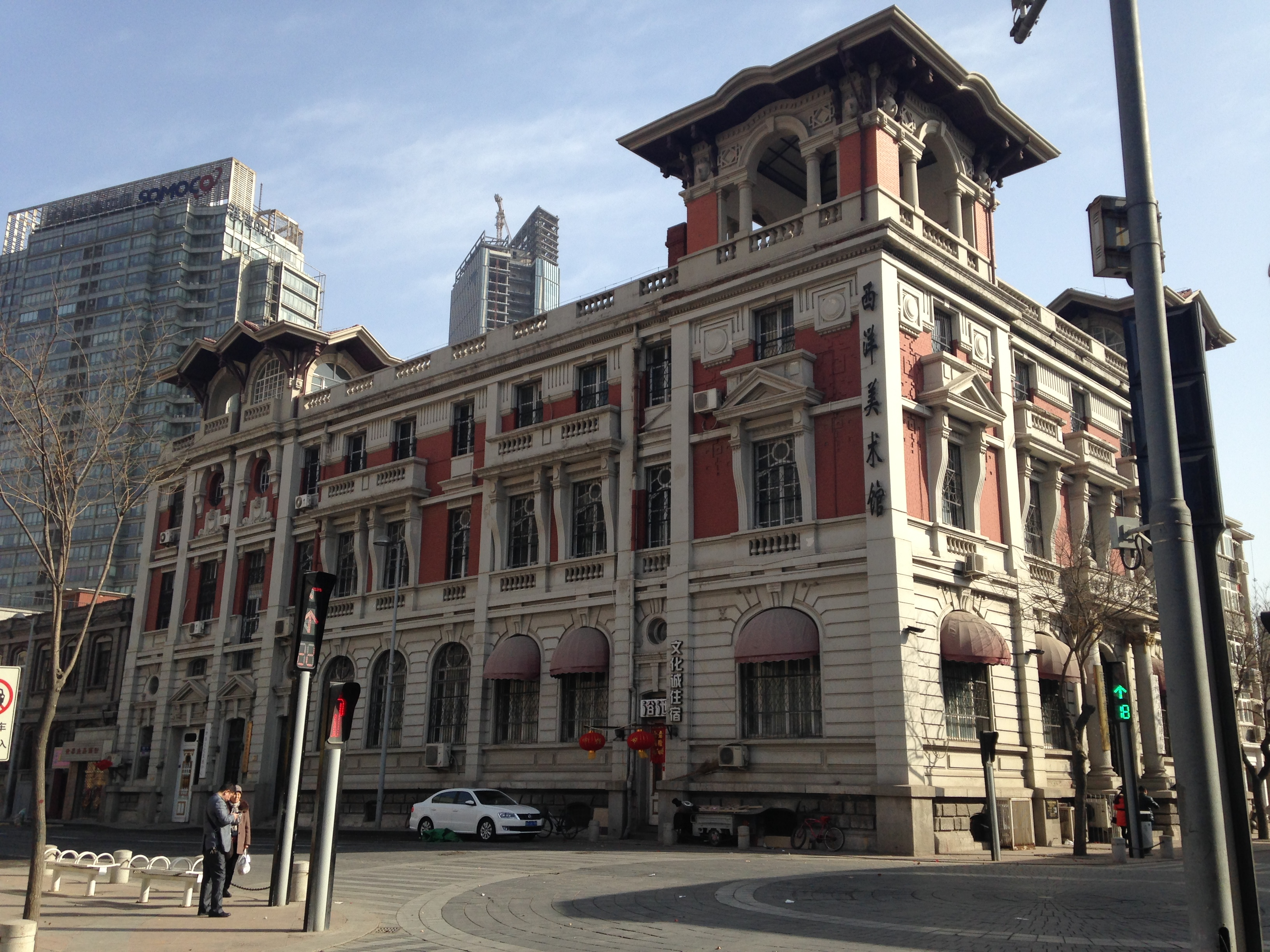
Office in Tianjin (completed 1908)

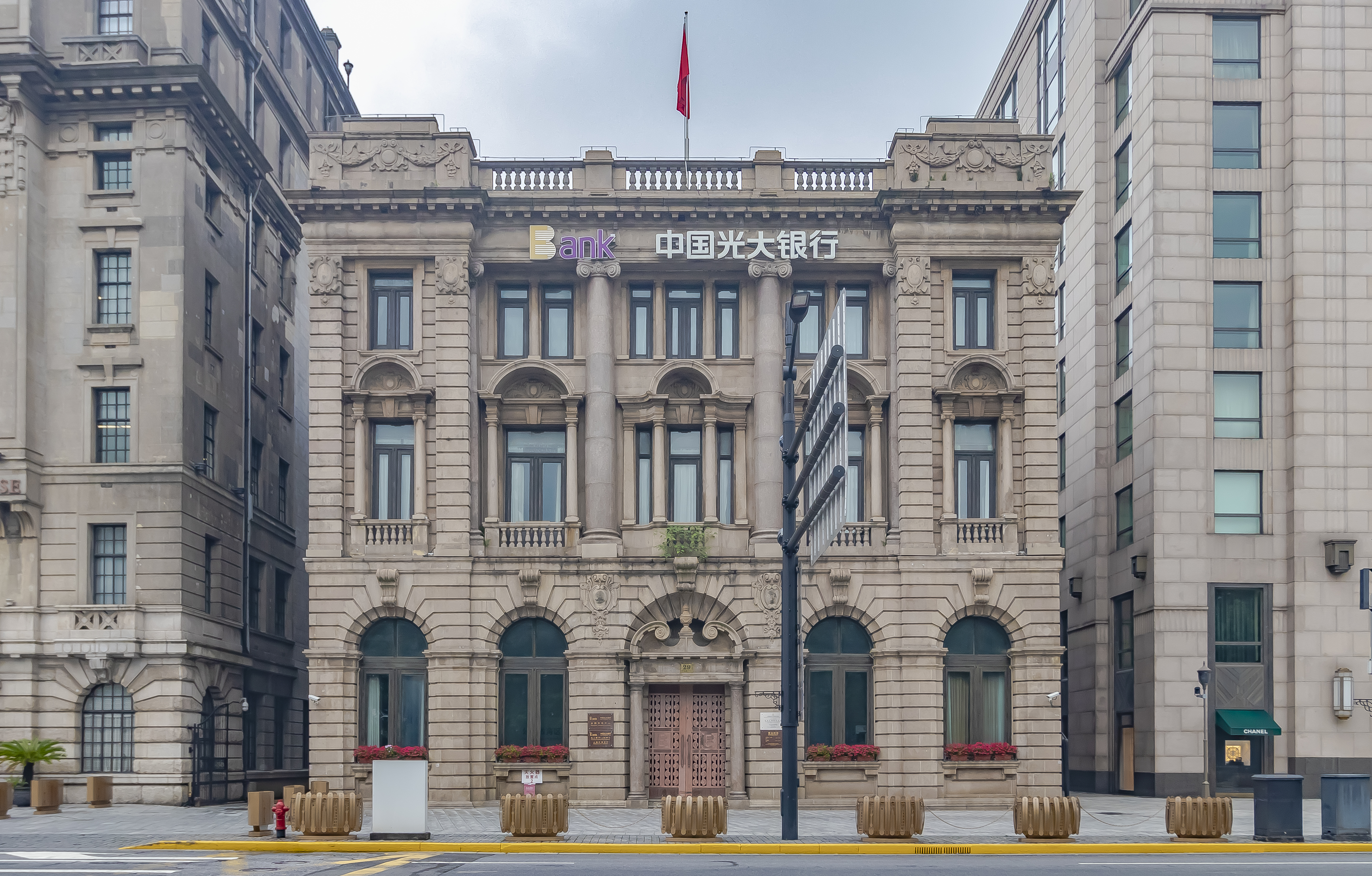
Office on the Bund in Shanghai (completed 1914)

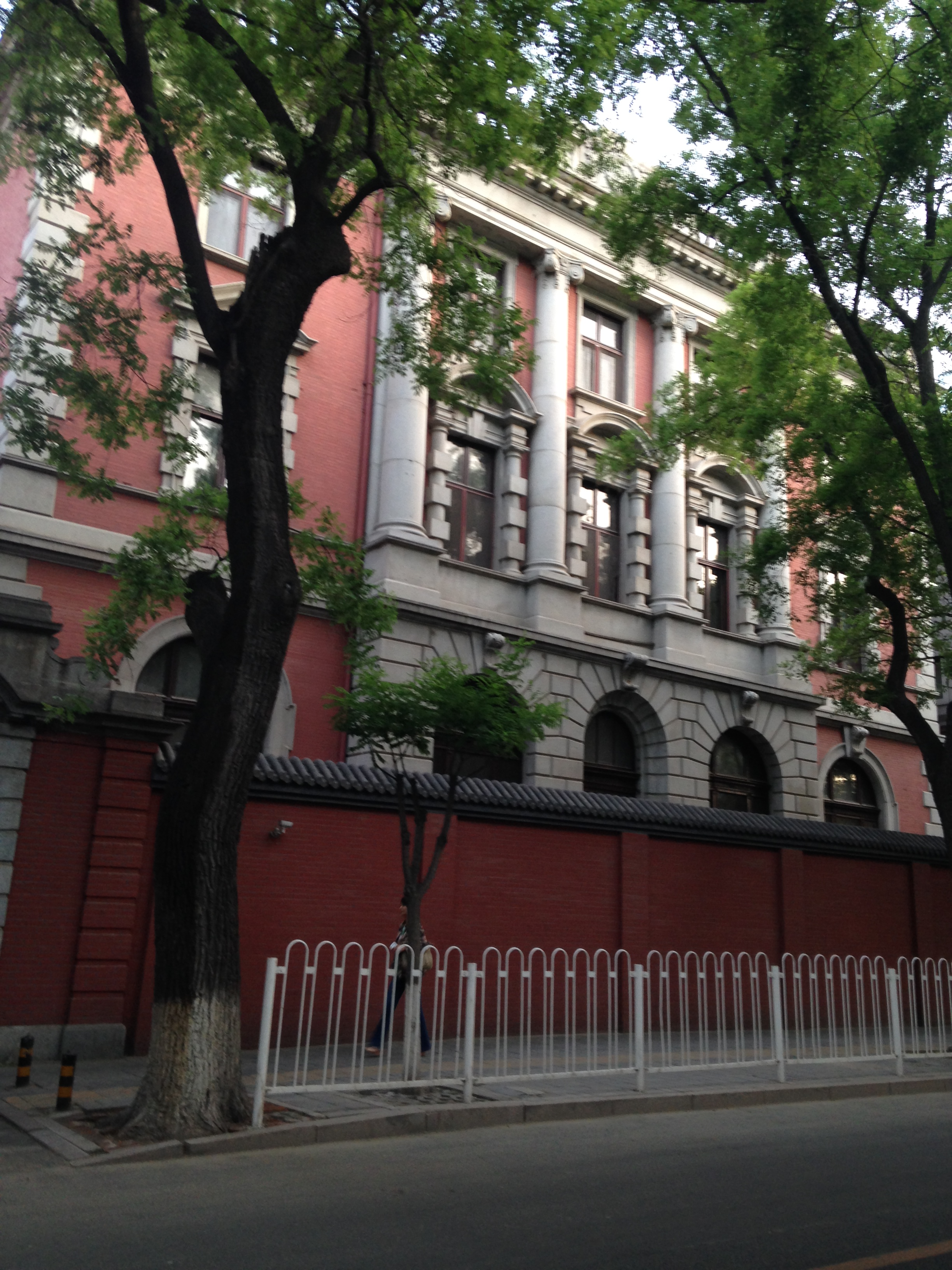
Office in the Beijing Legation Quarter (completed 1917)

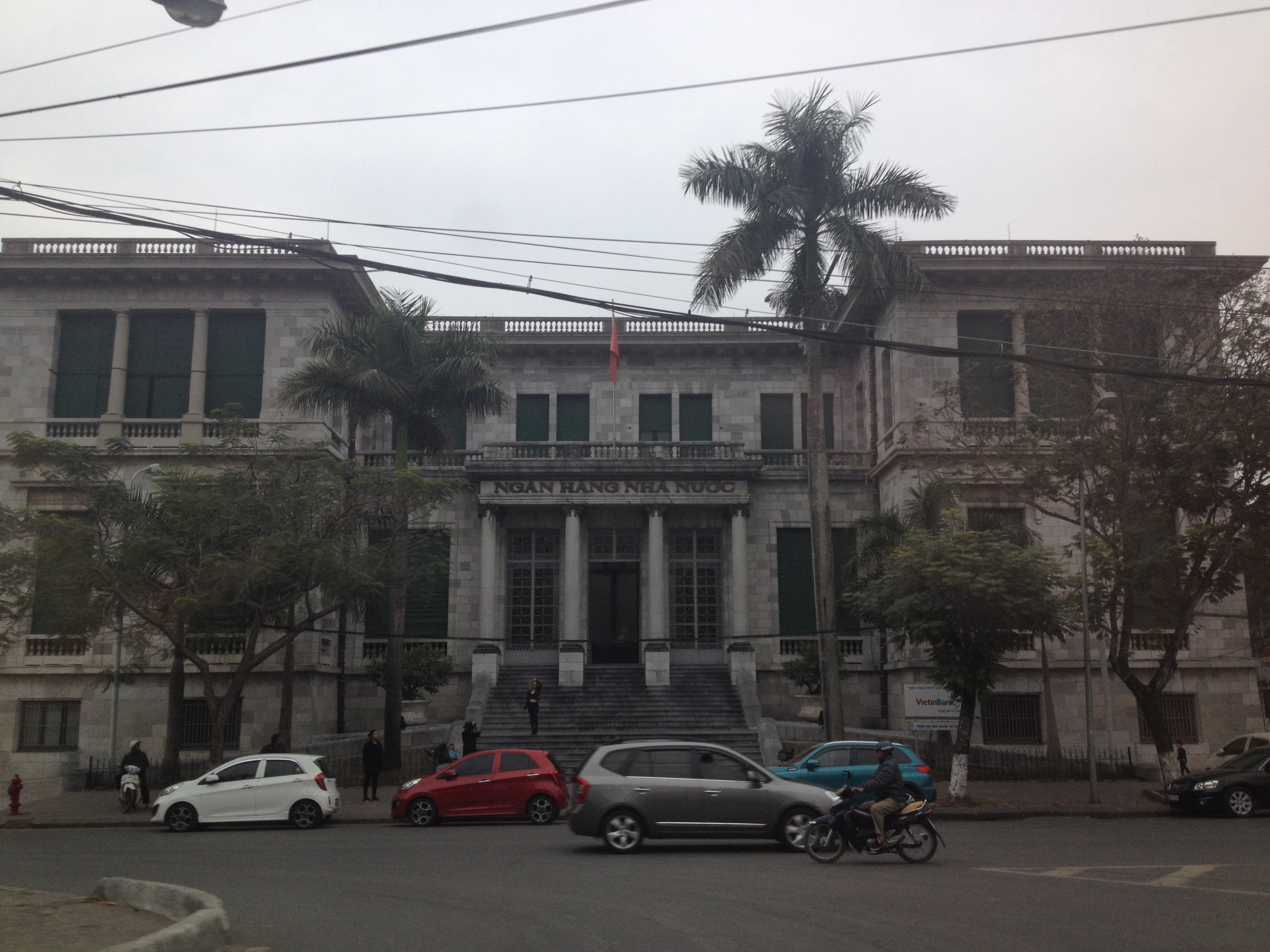
Branch in Haiphong (completed 1925)

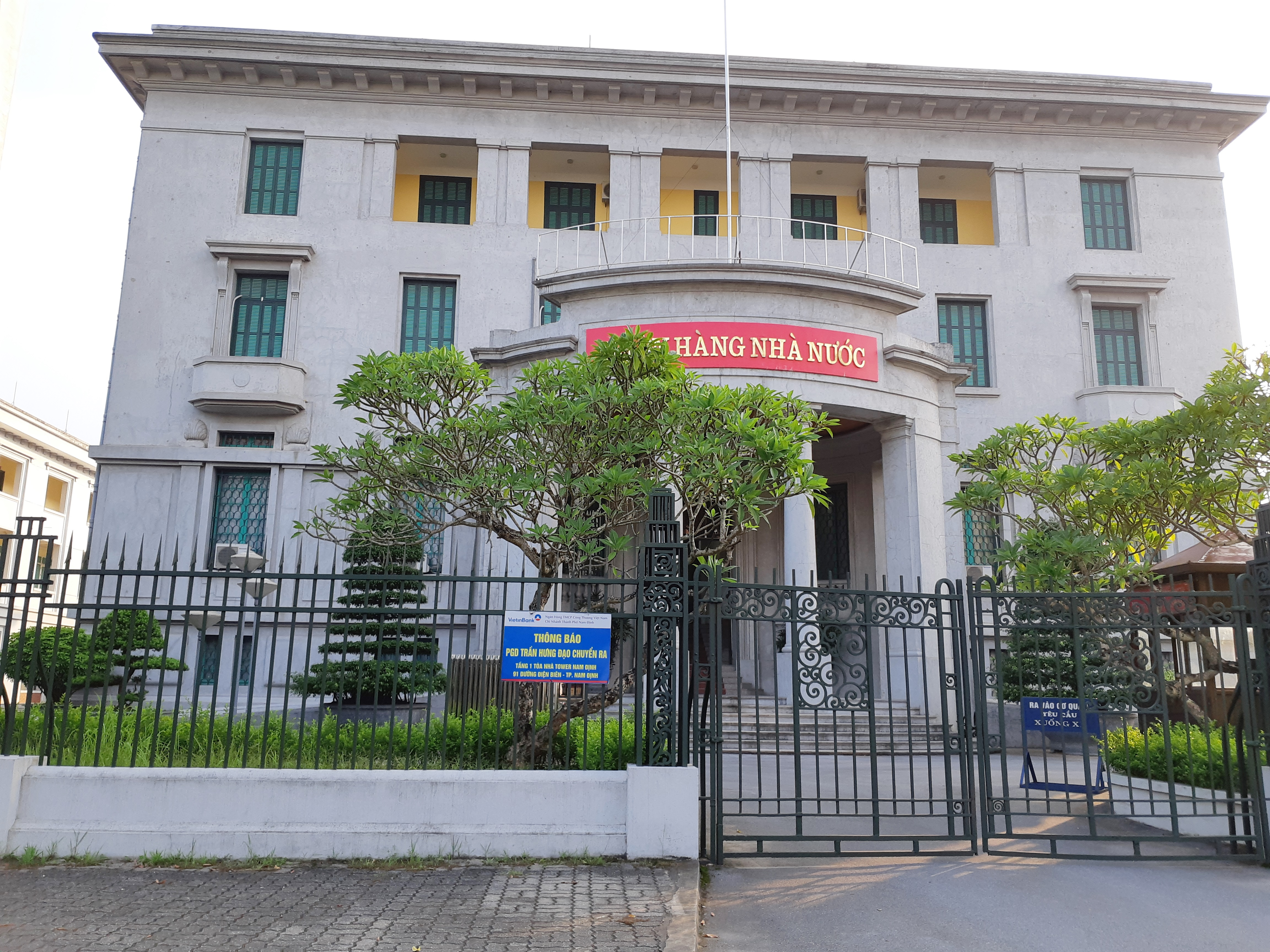
Office in Nam Định (completed 1929)

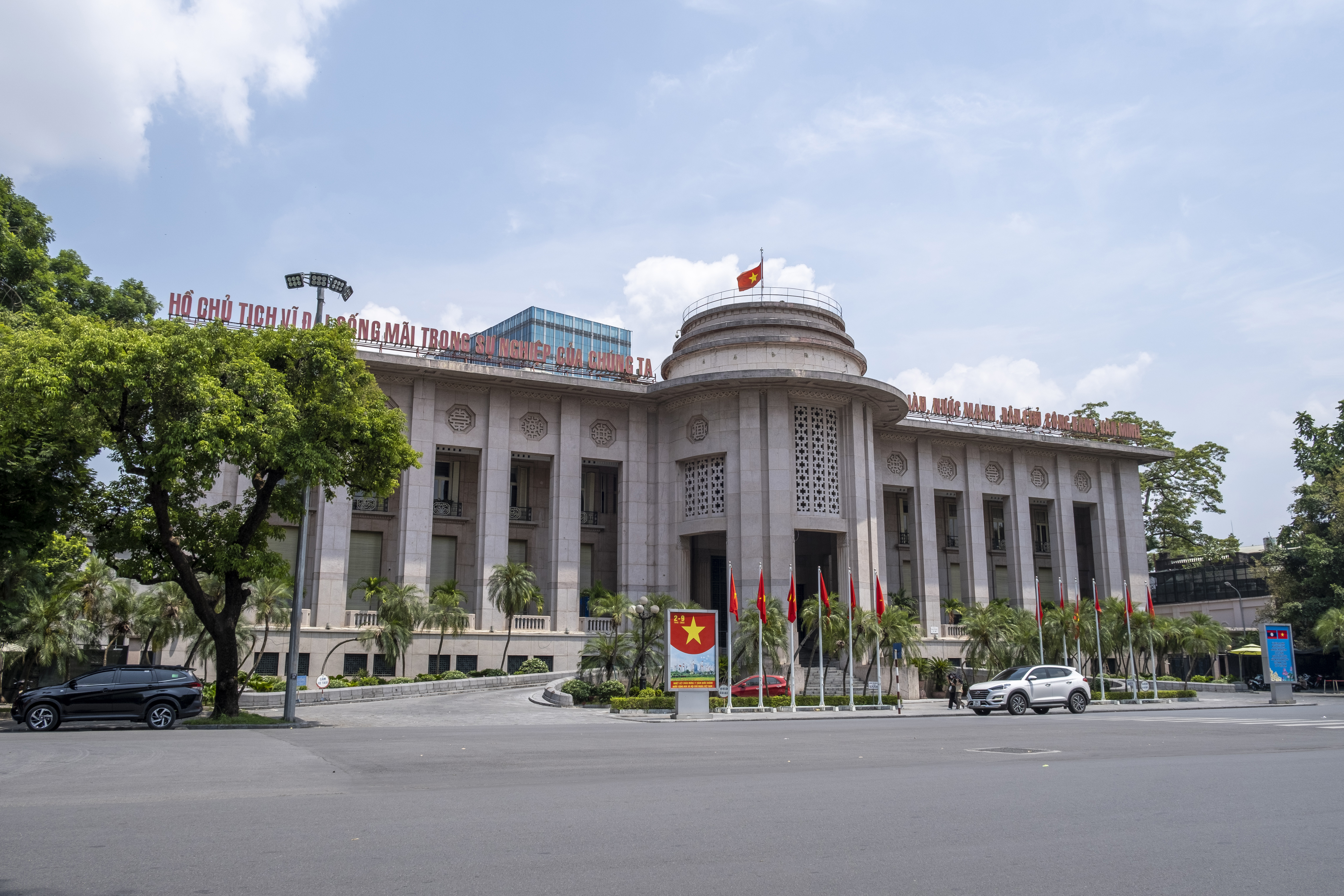
Office in Hanoi (completed 1930), now headquarters of the State Bank of Vietnam

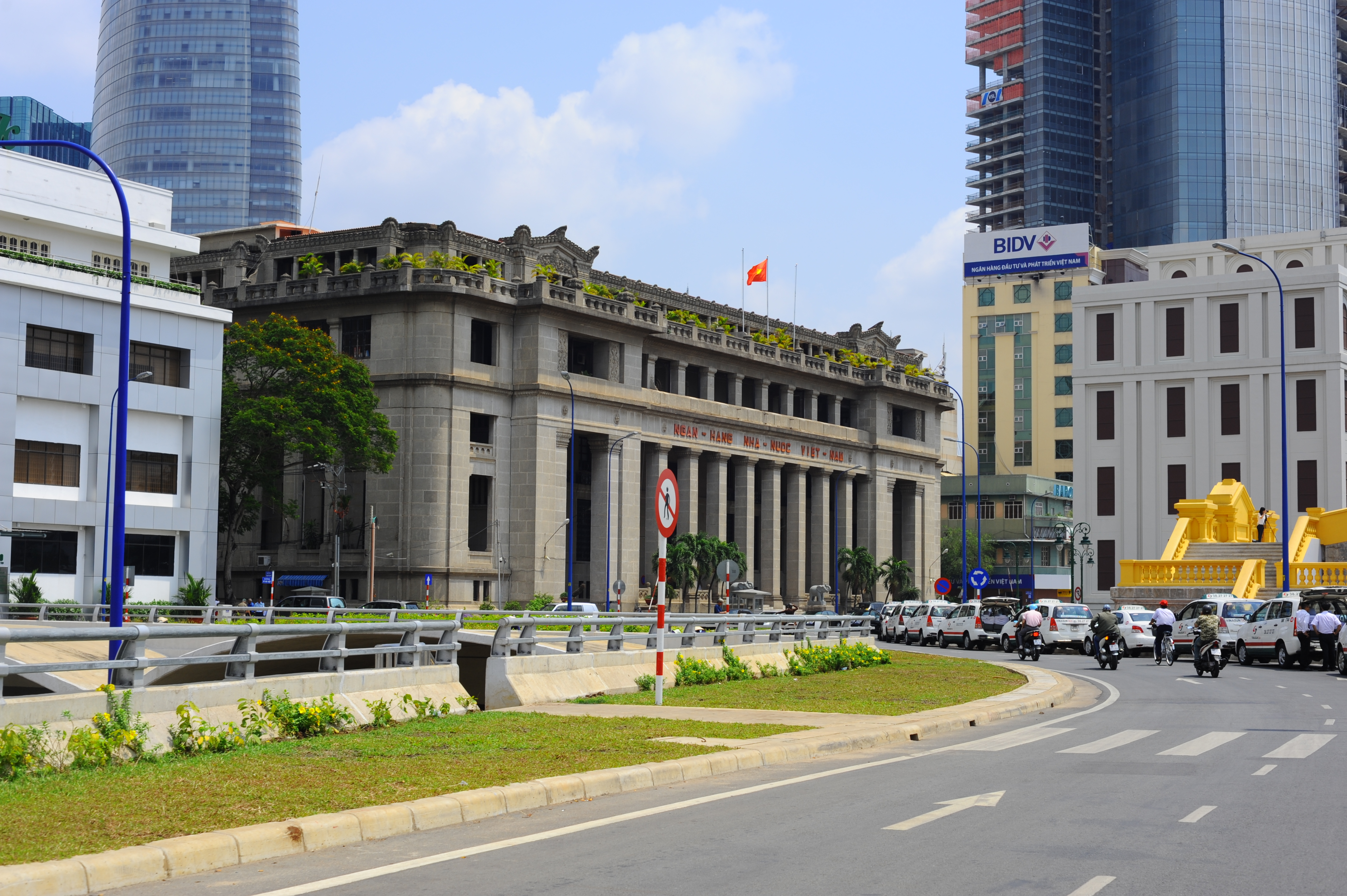
Branch building in Saigon (completed 1930), now the Ho Chi Minh City branch of the State Bank of Vietnam

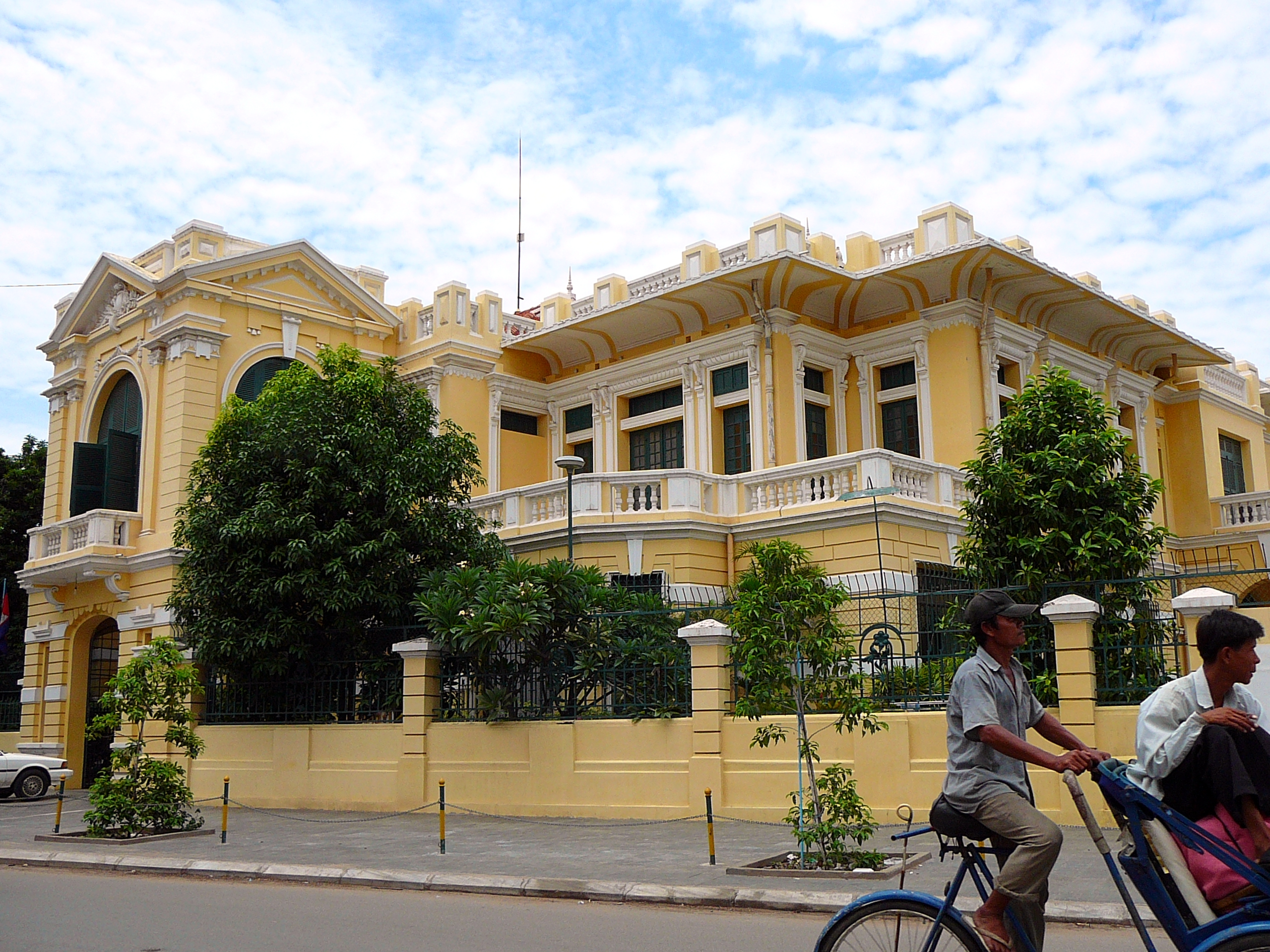
Office in Phnom Penh, after renovation in 2006

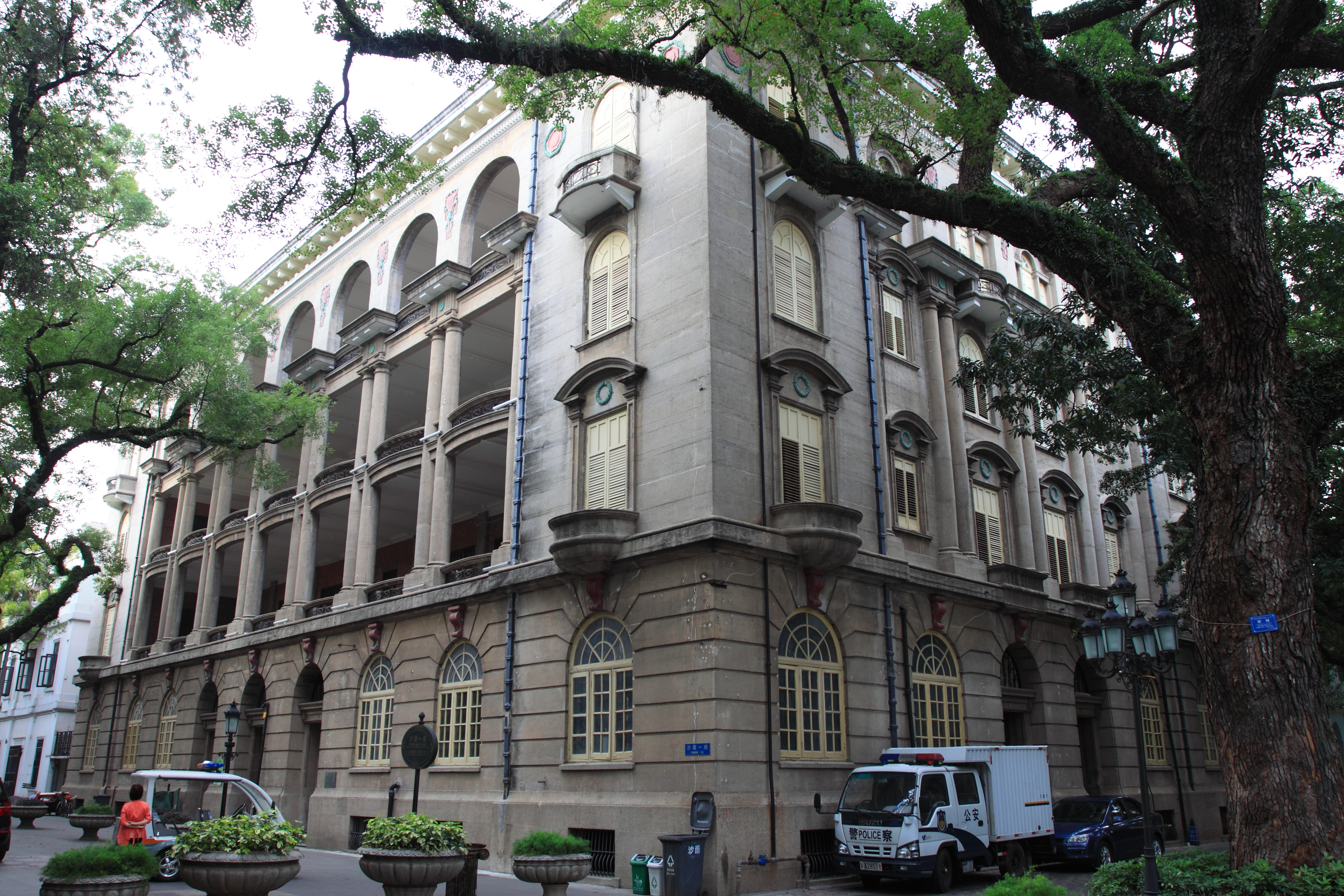
Office on Shamian Island in Guangzhou

The Banque de l'Indochine (French: [bɑ̃k də lɛ̃dɔʃin]), originally Banque de l'Indo-Chine ("Bank of Indochina"), was a bank created in 1875 in Paris to finance French colonial development in Asia. As a bank of issue in Indochina until 1952 (and in French Pacific territories until 1967), with many features of a central bank, it played a major role in the financial history of French Indochina, French India, New Caledonia, French Polynesia, and Djibouti, as well as French-backed ventures in China and Siam. After World War II, it lost its issuance privilege but reinvented itself as an investment bank in France, and developed new ventures in other countries, such as Saudi Arabia and South Africa.

The Compagnie Financière de Suez acquired a controlling interest in the Banque de l'Indochine in 1972, then merged it in 1975 with its own banking subsidiary to form Banque Indosuez, since 1996 itself part of the Crédit Agricole universal banking group.

== History ==
=== Background and creation ===
Following the early phases of the French conquest of Vietnam, the Comptoir d'escompte de Paris (CEP) in 1864 opened offices in French Cochinchina, and also developed a presence in Pondicherry, Calcutta, Bombay, Shanghai, Hong Kong, and Yokohama. Meanwhile, the rival Crédit Industriel et Commercial (CIC) had become the Paris correspondent of the Hong Kong and Shanghai Bank, and had powerful political backers in the conservative Catholic administration under France's President Patrice de MacMahon. In the early 1870s, both banks developed competing projects to create an institution that would receive the privilege of issuing money in French Indochina.

In October 1874, the CEP, together with its allies, the Hentsch-Lütscher, Hoskier, and Paccard & Mirabaud merchant banks and the newly created Banque de Paris et des Pays-Bas (BPPB), reached an agreement with the CIC to create the Banque de l'Indochine as a joint venture. On the face of it, CEP and CIC, with their respective allies (including for the CIC the Société Marseillaise de Crédit and the Banque franco-égyptienne), controlled equal blocks of shares in the new institution, but CEP was the dominant partner. Édouard Hentsch, the CEP's Chairman and board member of the BPPB, was the new venture's founding chairman, and its founding directeur (general manager) was the CEP's directeur Pierre Girod. The Banque de l'Indochine was formally established by presidential decree on 21 January 1875, with privilege to issue banknotes (initially in French franc and from 1885 in French Indochinese piastre) backed by its bullion reserves. At its creation, it took ownership of the CEP's former branches in Saigon and Pondicherry. The bank outsourced the production of coins to the Monnaie de Paris and of notes to the Bank of France.

=== Colonial bank of issue ===
The first banknotes, printed in Paris by the Bank of France for the Banque de l'Indochine, arrived in Saigon on 8 January 1876, nearly a year after the bank's creation. They were quickly adopted by ethnic-Chinese traders in and around Saigon, who were familiar with banknotes from experience in Hong Kong or Singapore. Even so, the bank's first years of activity were marked by occasional bouts of monetary instability.

Following the Treaty of Tientsin (1885) that concluded the Sino-French War, France consolidated its colonial rule northwards over Annam and Tonkin. Competitors of the CEP, and especially the Société Générale, feared the Banque de l'Indochine would monopolize credit and banking activity in the expanded territory. The French government, whose moderate Republican orientation was supported by the CEP against the more conservative Société Générale, leveraged that situation to encourage the Banque de l'Indochine to increase its credit provision and provide more support to Indochina's economy. A compromise was found in 1887 under which the Société Générale would join the Banque de l'Indochine as a minority shareholder, through a capital increase that was closed on 15 July 1888 and resulted in a 15.5 percent stake for Société Générale. Meanwhile, the bank's issuance privilege was extended to Annam and Tonkin in February 1888, as well as to New Caledonia. Following that restructuring, the CEP controlled four of the board's eleven seats, CIC three, and Société Générale and the BPPB one each. The CEP's influence was eclipsed following its collapse in 1889, but it came back as the Comptoir national d'escompte de Paris (CNEP) with one board member in 1890 and retook the Banque de l'Indochine's chairmanship in 1892. From that date, the Banque de l'Indochine effectively became a joint vehicle ("établissement de place") for the Paris banking community's activities in the Indo-Pacific. That evolution was completed in 1896 as the Crédit Lyonnais, which had expanded into Egypt and India, entered the Bank de l'Indochine's capital and board. The Banque de l'Indochine increasingly behaved as an autonomous actor, shedding its former identity as "daughter of the CEP". The fact that French banks acted together in a single venture, as opposed to competing with each other for banking business in Indochina, may be attributed to the need to face regional rivalry from the powerful British banks such as the Hong Kong and Shanghai Bank, and also by the intrinsic advantage that the bank of issue privilege conferred to its holder against any upstart.

The bank opened branches (French: succursales) in Haiphong in Tonkin on 1 April 1885 and, at the French government's request formalized in a decree of 20 February 1888, in Nouméa, New Caledonia on 17 September 1888, and in Papeete, French Polynesia on 5 December 1905. It opened offices (French: agences) in Hanoi on 17 January 1887, Phnom Penh on 22 February 1891, Tourane in Annam (now Da Nang) in August 1891, Hong Kong on 1 July 1894 (taking over the former office of the CNEP), Bangkok in February 1897, Shanghai in July 1898, Canton and Hankou (now part of Wuhan) on 1 March 1902, Battambang (then in Siam) in August 1902, Singapore on 1 March 1905, Tianjin on 18 February 1907, Beijing in July 1907, and Yunnan-Fu (now Kunming) in 1910.

On 13 August 1891, for the first time, the Banque de l'Indochine printed its own piastre banknotes at a new facility in Saigon. In 1898, it issued the first banknotes denominated in French Indian rupees.

In 1900, the bank's Shanghai office participated in the financing of the French contribution to the international expeditionary corps that suppressed the Boxer Rebellion, and subsequently represented the interests of the French government in handling the Boxer indemnity. The Banque de l'Indochine invested in a number of colonial ventures such as the Société de construction des Chemins de fer Indochinois and the Chemins de fer de l'Indochine et du Yunnan, for which the French government asked it to open an office in Mongtze (now Mengzi) in 1914. It repeatedly entered new territories at the request of the French government. In July 1908, it thus established an office in Djibouti to co-finance the Compagnie du Chemin de fer de Djibouti à Addis-Abeba, the first-ever bank in the city. In 1918, it opened an office in Vladivostok to serve the Allied military base there during the Siberian intervention.

In July 1921, the Banque Industrielle de Chine (BIDC), which had been created in 1913 to compete with the Banque de l'Indochine for the financing of French ventures in Shanghai and elsewhere in China, collapsed despite the backing it had received from the French Foreign Ministry and the BPPB. The latter acquired the BIDC's sounder assets, and the rest was managed by the Banque de l'Indochine as a bad bank, the Société française de gérance de la BIDC, and eventually restructured in 1925 as the Franco-Chinese Bank (BFC). The Banque de l'Indochine remained a significant stakeholder of the BFC, together with the BPPB and the Banque Nationale de Crédit.

In the 1920s the Banque de l'Indochine participated in more colonial ventures, such as the Crédit Foncier de l'Indochine, the Compagnie Francaise de Tramways et d'Eclairage Electrique de Shanghai, and the Société Le Nickel in New Caledonia. It opened an office in Fort-Bayard (now Zhanjiang) in the French Leased Territory of Guangzhouwan on 23 February 1925, and offices in Cần Thơ and Nam Định in 1926. In 1930, in coordination with the French government, the Banque de l'Indochine took the French Indochinese piastre off the silver standard (which it had upheld until then, alone with China which in turn abandoned it in 1935) and into the gold standard. In 1936, the piastre was taken off the gold standard, together with the French franc to which it was kept convertible at a rate of 10 francs for 1 piastre.

Throughout the 1920s, the French Parliament extended the Banque de l'Indochine's issuance privilege only for short periods of time, from 1920 to 1925 on an annual basis, and then every semester, in contrast to earlier long-term extensions. The Banque de Paris et des Pays-Bas, which by then had become the Banque de l'Indochine's major competitor, provided covert funding to advocacy efforts against further extension. On 31 March 1931, new French legislation eventually extended the bank's issuance privilege by 25 years, against which the French state participated in a capital increase and subsequently held 20 percent of the bank's equity capital as well as extensive rights in its governance. These included six board memberships and the selection of the board chair. The French government initially kept René Jules Thion de la Chaume, a traditional banker, as chairman of the Banque de l'Indochine, but in 1936 replaced him with a lifetime civil servant, Marcel Borduge.

Also in 1931, the Banque de l'Indochine participated in the establishment of the Bank for International Settlements in Basel, and in a capital increase of the State Bank of Morocco, despite the latter being under the BPPB's dominant influence.

=== World War II ===
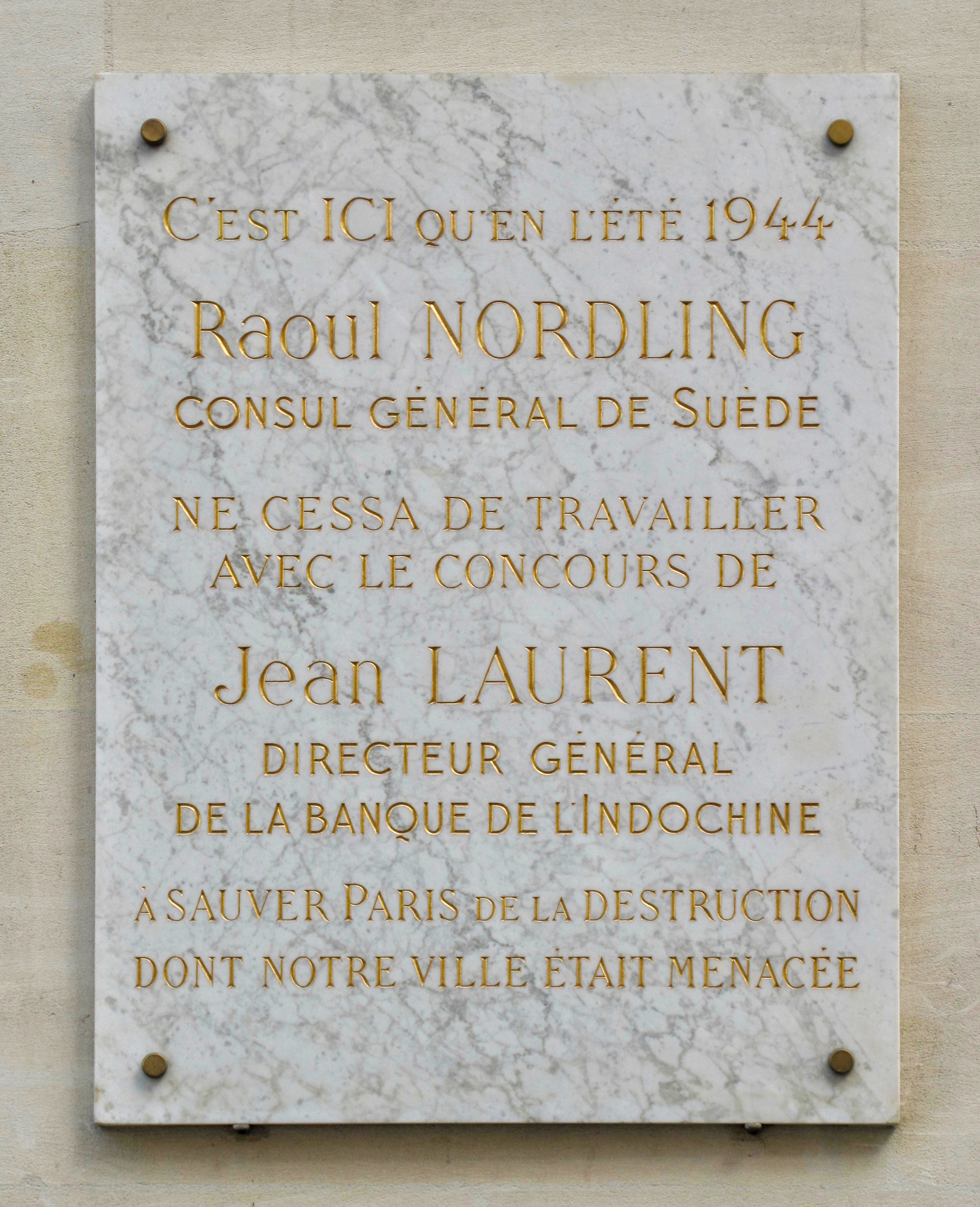
Plaque at the former Swedish Consulate in Paris, 78 rue d'Anjou, commemorating the efforts of Raoul Nordling and Jean Laurent in August 1944

During World War II, the Banque de l'Indochine was chaired by Paul Baudoin, who in the summer of 1940 was the first Foreign Minister of Vichy France. In 1941, the Banque de l'Indochine was allowed to acquire an equity stake in its rival the Banque de Paris et des Pays-Bas. The chief executive, Jean Laurent, in contrast to Baudoin, was involved in the French Resistance. Largely thanks to him, the bank avoided participation in the worst aspects of collaboration while providing some support to the Resistance. In August 1944, its Paris headquarters was the venue for the negotiation between Swedish diplomat Raoul Nordling and German commander Dietrich von Choltitz to limit bloodshed during the Liberation of Paris. The Banque de l'Indochine, like the BPPB, was subsequently able to escape nationalization following the liberation of France, even though Baudoin was sentenced to Indignité nationale.

In 1940 the bank established offices in London and Yokohama, and in November 1942 relocated the latter to Tokyo until it closed in September 1945. Under Japanese occupation, the bank's offices in Hong Kong and Singapore ceased activity in early 1942, and those in China were reduced to near-complete paralysis. In Pondicherry, the news of the armistice of 22 June 1940 were met with panic and triggered a bank run on the Banque de l'Indochine. This in turn played a role in the decision by Louis Bonvin, Governor of French India, to reverse his prior allegiance to Vichy France and rally to Free France, which allowed the bank to receive financial support from the British Raj.

=== Postwar history ===
The future of the Banque de l'Indochine was vividly debated in the new political context created by the liberation of France. In 1945, the French government decided to revalue the French Indochinese piastre to a rate of 17 French francs to one piastre, up from 10, a decision that initiated a bout of trafficking and corruption that would become known as the piastres affair (French: scandale des piastres); that same year, the CFP franc replaced the piastre as the currency of French Polynesia and New Caledonia. In 1947, following protracted negotiations, the Banque de l'Indochine approved the decision to buy back the French government's 20 percent equity stake, despite a steep price imposed by Finance Minister Maurice Schumann. Its issuance privilege was revoked in principle by a law of 25 September 1948, but was kept in practice until March 1949 in Djibouti (replaced by direct issuance by the Treasury), December 1951 in Indochina (replaced by the Institut d'Émission des États du Cambodge, du Laos et du Viet-nam), and March 1967 in French Polynesia and New Caledonia (replaced by the Institut d'Émission d'Outre-Mer). Meanwhile, the Banque de l'Indochine developed its activity, as an increasingly active investment bank in France, and a retail and commercial bank internationally, both in the colonies rebranded as French Union and in other countries, such as South Africa.

The bank's activities in mainland China were partly revived after the defeat of Japan in 1945 (as were the offices in Hong Kong and Singapore), kept for a while after the Communist victory of the Chinese Civil War in 1949, but eventually liquidated in the 1950s. Meanwhile, the bank endeavored to diversify away from its traditional colonial turf. In 1946 it established itself in Addis Ababa (Ethiopia), where it stayed until 1963, and for a few years in the early 1950s also in Dire Dawa. In Saudi Arabia, it opened a branch in Jeddah in 1947, followed by Dammam and Khobar-Dhahran in the 1950s. It was also briefly established in Al Hudaydah, Yemen ca. 1949–1951. It created subsidiaries in San Francisco (French American Banking Corporation) in 1947 and Johannesburg (French Bank of South Africa) in 1949. In the New Hebrides, now Vanuatu, it established a branch in Port Vila in 1948, and an office in Luganville in the 1950s. It also opened locations in Malaysia in 1951, Tokyo (again) in 1953, and Lausanne in 1957.

Even so, Indochina still represented more than half of the bank's income in the early 1950s. In 1953, the bank opened a branch in Vientiane, Laos. Following the French loss of North Vietnam following the 1954 Geneva Conference, it had to close its branches in Hanoi on 31 August 1954, in Haiphong on 31 March 1955, in Cần Thơ on 30 April 1955, and in Da Lat and Da Nang on 30 June 1955. On 20 October 1955, the Banque de l'Indochine sold several of its properties, including its main office building in Saigon, to the National Bank of Vietnam, the central bank of the newly established Republic of Vietnam. It reorganized its remaining activities in Indochina as a Saigon-based subsidiary, the Banque française de l'Asie.

In 1954–1955, the Banque de l'Indochine also ceased its activity in Pondicherry following the de facto end of French India; its branch was acquired by Indian Overseas Bank. In 1963, its activity in Cambodia was nationalized.

By the early 1950s, the Banque de l'Indochine also had a broad network of minority stakes in other banks, including the Banque de Paris et des Pays-Bas (acquired in 1941), Crédit Foncier d'Algérie et de Tunisie, Banque industrielle de l'Afrique du Nord (Algeria), Banque commerciale africaine (West and Central Africa), Bank Sabbag (Lebanon), and Franco-Chinese Bank, among others. In 1960, it took over the Franco-Chinese Bank by purchasing the shares formerly held by Banque de Paris et des Pays-Bas and Banque Lazard. In 1973, it converted its branches in French Polynesia into a subsidiary, the Banque de Polynésie.

=== Merger into Banque Indosuez ===
In 1966, to prevent an outright takeover of military-industrial concern Schneider by Belgium's Empain group, the Banque de l'Indochine acquired 10 percent of Schneider's capital. As a consequence of that transaction, Empain took 11 percent of the bank's own capital. Its chairman François de Flers then attempted to counter Empain's influence in the bank (as the rest of the shareholder base was highly dispersed) by inviting the Compagnie Financière de Suez, with which the bank had several common business interests, to invest in it as well. In January 1967, Suez acquired 7 percent of the bank's capital, the same amount as held by Empain by then. De Flers subsequently invited La Paternelle, an insurer, to acquire a further 4 percent of the bank's capital, thus consolidating a group of friendly shareholders. In late 1969, the Assurances du groupe de Paris (AGP), a holding company that had been formed in the meantime and owned La Paternelle, owned 22 percent of the Banque de l'Indochine, and by 1972, 45 percent. That year, AGP sold its stake to the Compagnie Financière de Suez. In 1975, the latter merged the Banque de l'Indochine with its subsidiary the Banque de Suez et de l'Union des Mines, to form Banque Indosuez.

== Sites ==
The Banque de l'Indochine used or commissioned a number of prominent buildings, some of which are notable exemplars of French colonial architecture.

=== Paris ===
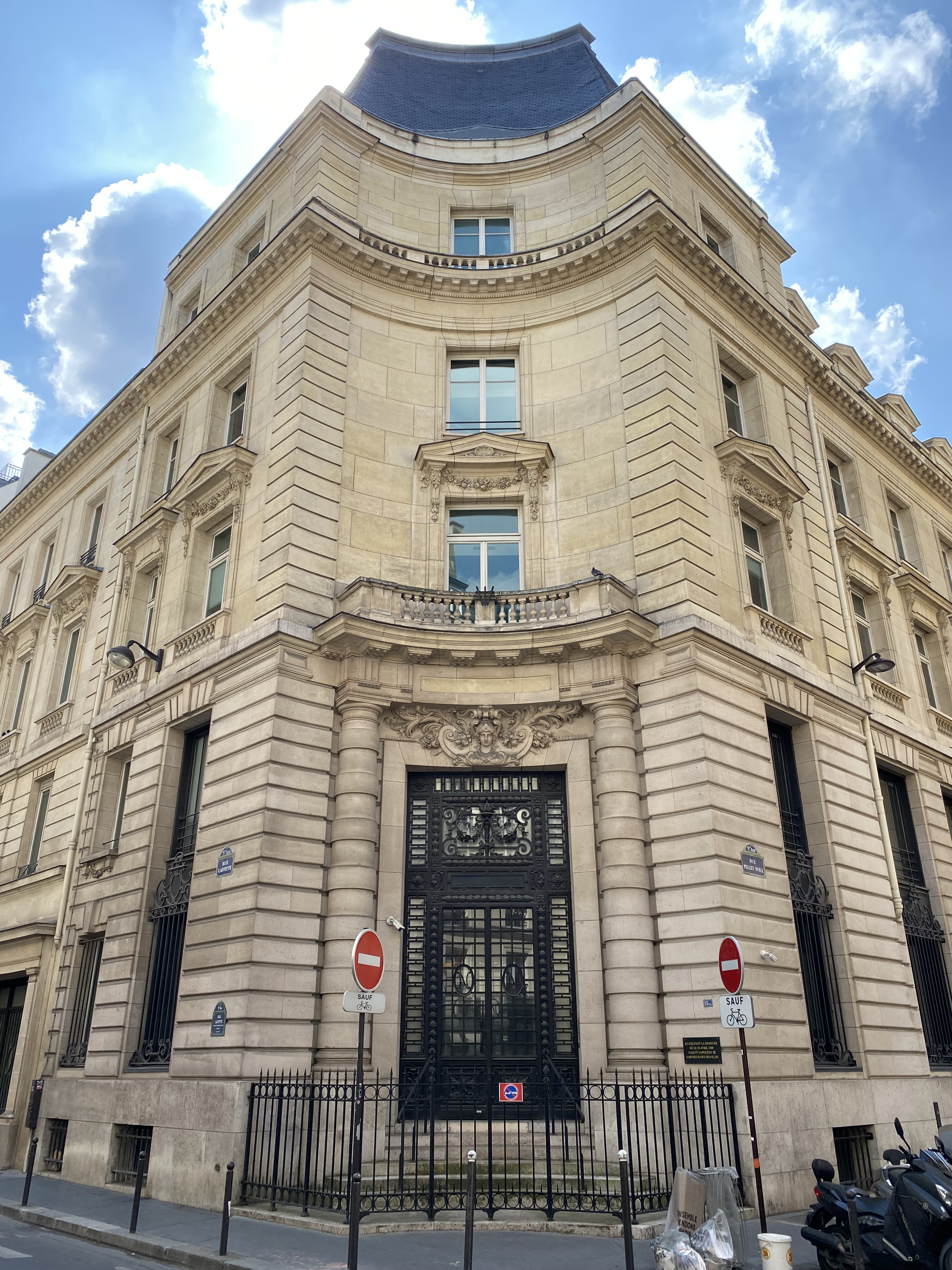
Second Parisian headquarters of the Banque de l'Indochine at 15 bis rue Laffitte (1902)

Originally, the bank was established at 34, rue Laffitte, in a building that was later demolished. In July 1902, it moved to a new headquarter building nearby on 15 bis, rue Laffitte, designed by Henri Paul Nénot and whose exterior still survives.

In March 1922, the bank moved to a new and larger building started in 1913 but whose construction was interrupted by World War I, on 96 boulevard Haussmann, designed by architect René Patouillard-Demoriane. That building remained the seat of Banque Indosuez until the late 1990s. It was largely rebuilt behind the preserved original façade in the mid-2000s, on a design by Jean-Jacques Ory.

=== Indochina ===
The bank's seat of Saigon, its original and main hub of activity in Asia, was located on Quai de Belgique (now Bến Chương Dương) on the banks of the Bến Nghé Channel, just east of its confluence with the Bến Nghé River. Its latest reconstruction on the same site, by the Société d'Exploitation des Établissements Brossard et Mopin using granite from Biên Hòa, was completed in late 1930 and inaugurated in 1931. It was designed in ostentatious neoclassical style by architect Félix Dumail, with some exterior details inspired by Cham and Khmer architecture, and a large art deco atrium.

That building was sold and transferred in 1955 to the National Bank of Vietnam, the Republic of Vietnam's new central bank, and in July 1976 was taken over by the State Bank of Vietnam following the Fall of Saigon. In 2016, the Vietnamese authorities added the building to the list of protected national relics.

From 1955 to 1975 the Banque française de l'Asie, South-Vietnamese subsidiary of the Banque de l'Indochine, had its Saigon seat in the former building of the Diethelm group, also on the Quai de Belgique.

The bank's Hanoi office was opened in 1887, and in 1901 moved to a larger building on boulevard Amiral-Courbet facing the Square Paul-Bert, now Vườn hoa Chí Linh on the eastern side of Hoàn Kiếm Lake. It was again relocated in late 1930 to a new and ornate art deco building nearby at the eastern end of the square, built in pink concrete by Aviat, a local contractor, and designed by Félix Dumail and Georges Trouvé. The new building was ceremonially inaugurated on 30 March 1931 by acting governor-general Eugène Robin. The previous seat was converted into housing for the bank's employees. In 1954, the Hanoi branch was taken over by the National Bank of Vietnam (Ngân hàng Quốc gia Việt Nam, renamed the State Bank of Vietnam in 1960) and has been the central bank's head office since then.

The Haiphong branch office, established in 1885, was replaced with a new building designed by architect Collet and inaugurated on 19 October 1925. It has been used by the State Bank of Vietnam since 1955.

The Nam Định office was established in 1926 in a provisional location, and moved to a permanent building inaugurated on 13 May 1929, designed by Félix Dumail, that is still in use by the State Bank of Vietnam.

The office of the Banque de l'Indochine in Phnom Penh was built in the early 1890s and rebuilt in the early 20th century. In 1965, Cambodian industrialist Van Thuan acquired it and made it the headquarters of his enterprises. He relocated in Hong Kong in 1969, and his Cambodian properties were expropriated in 1975 by the Khmer Rouge regime. The building was then taken over by the National Bank of Cambodia. In 2003, Van Thuan's family bought back the building from the Cambodian authorities and subsequently renovated it. His daughter Van Porleng opened a French fine dining restaurant there, branded Van's, in December 2007.

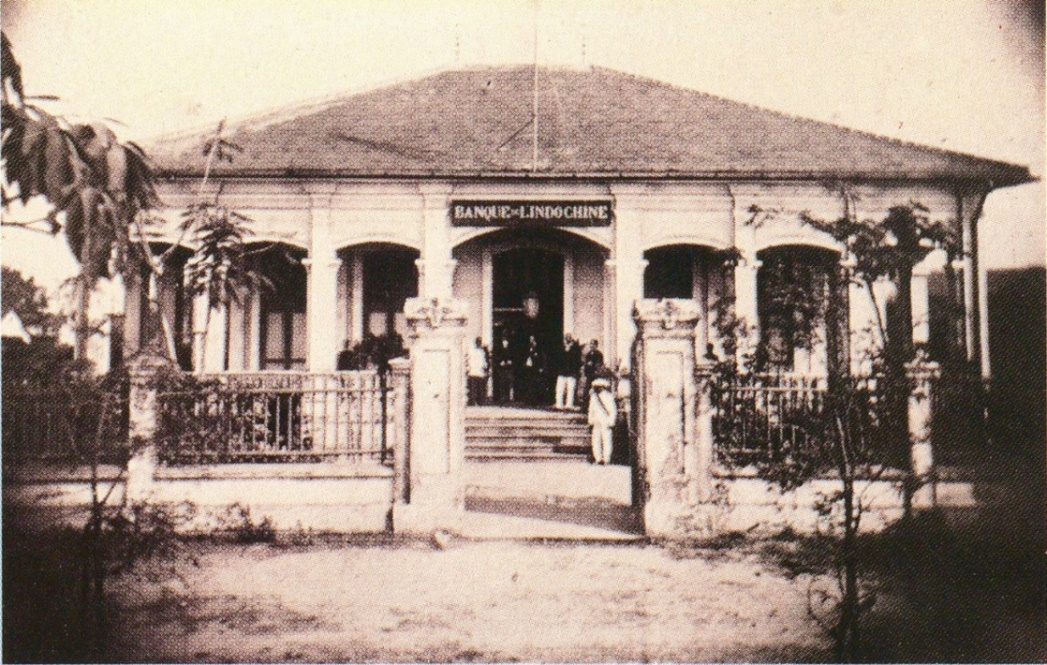
Old seat of the bank in Saigon (now demolished), late 19th or early 20th century

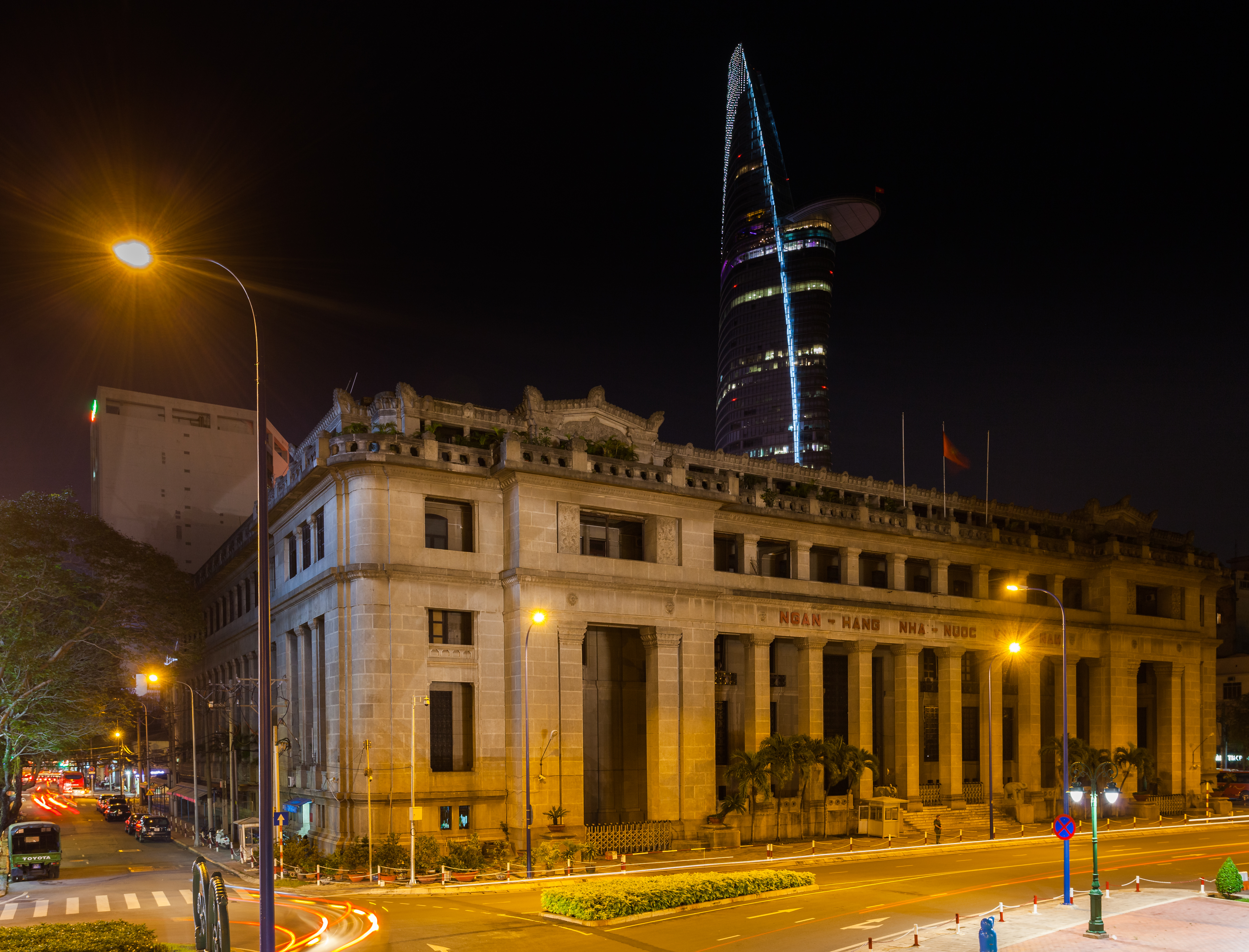
The Saigon bank's building at night, with Bitexco Financial Tower in background

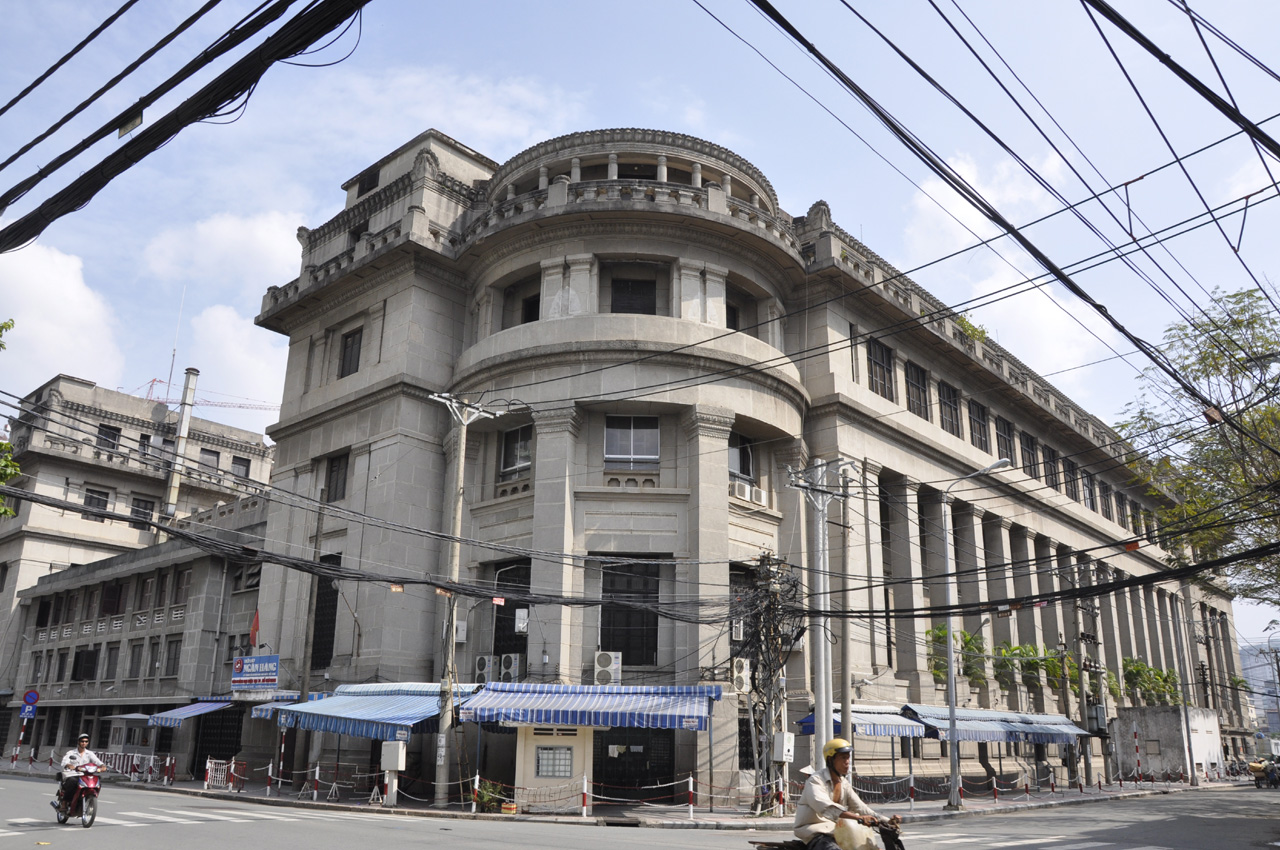
Rear view of the Saigon building

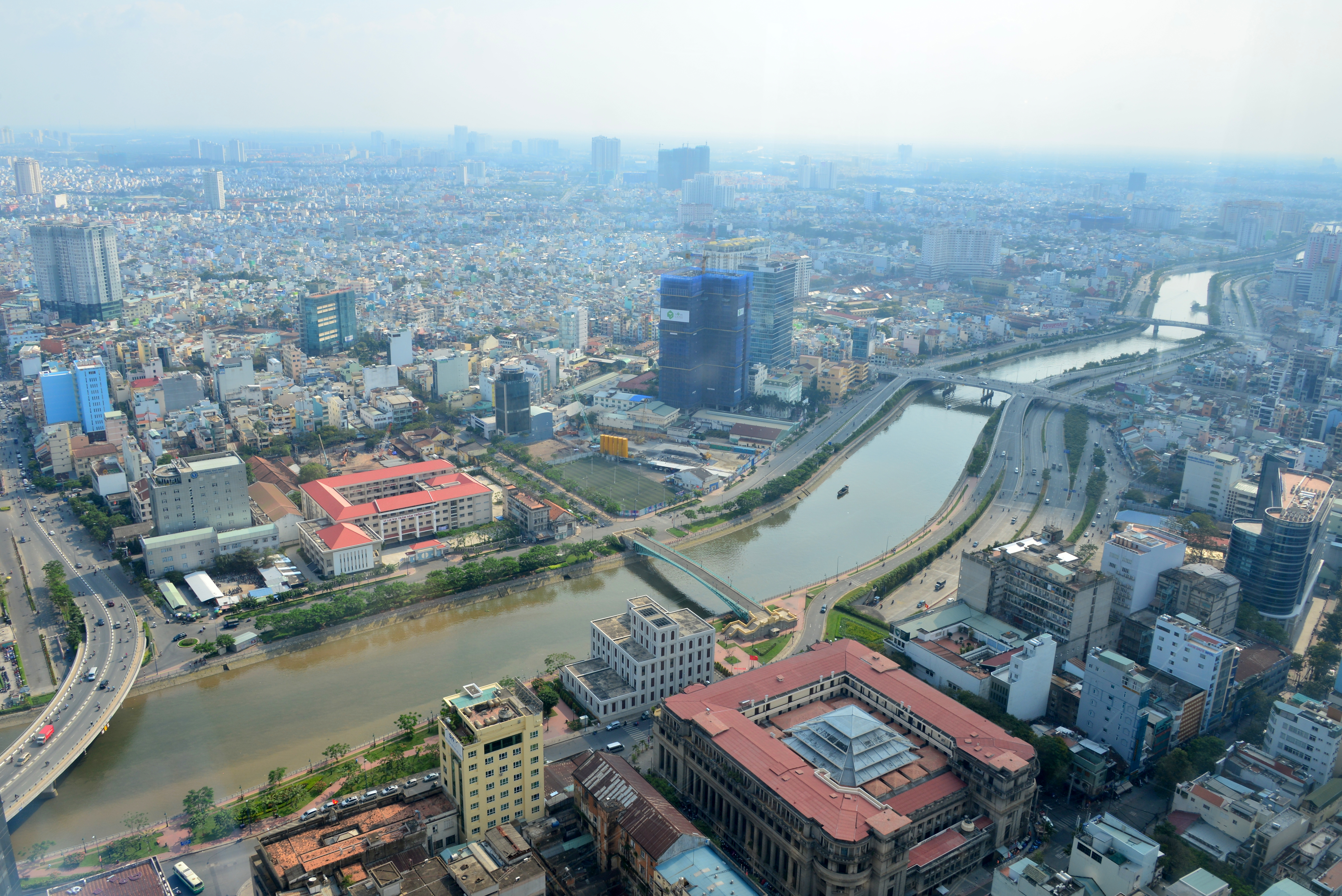
Aerial view of the Saigon bank building (bottom center) and the Bến Nghé Channel

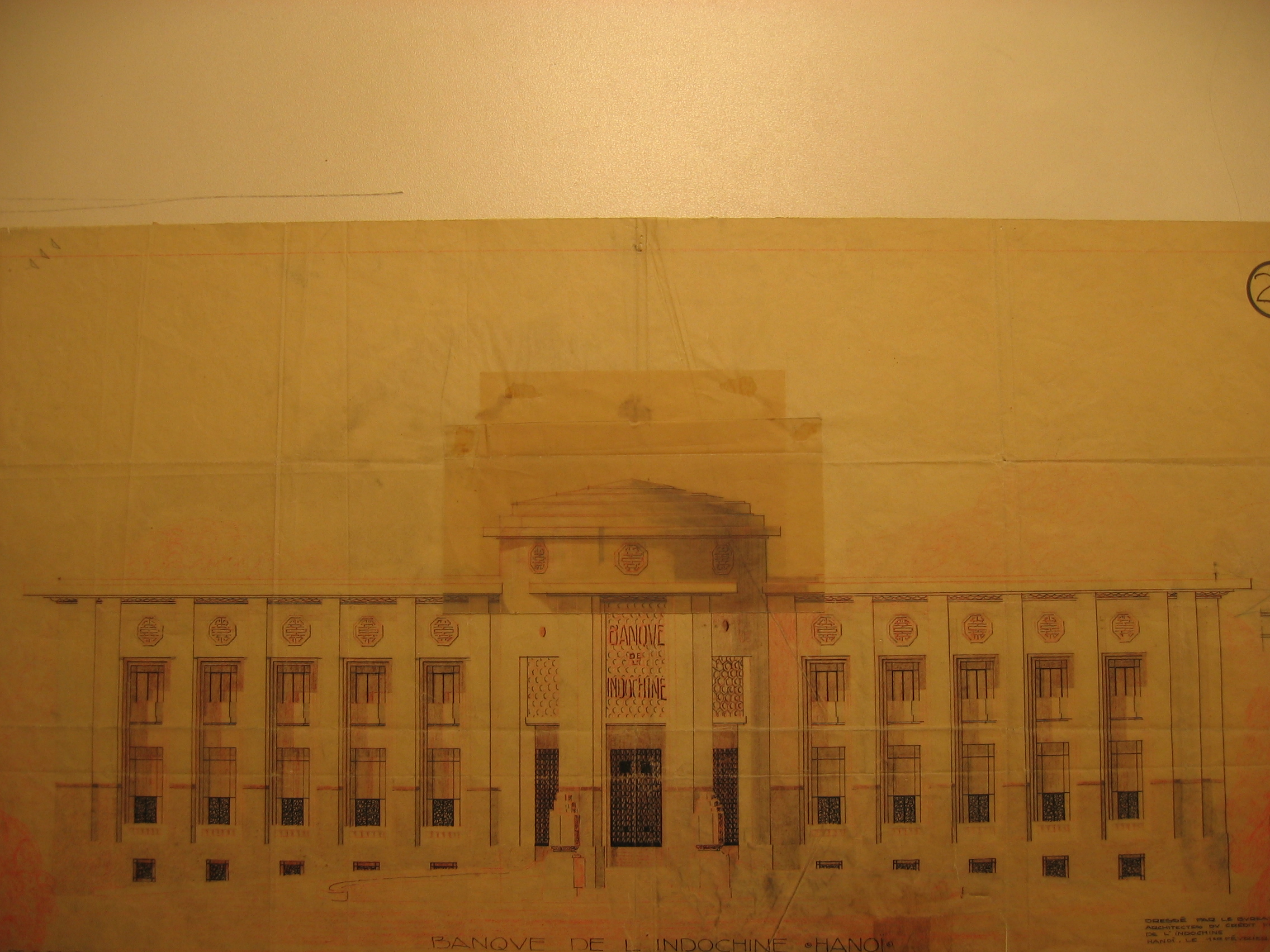
Drawing by Félix Dumail for the bank's new building in Hanoi

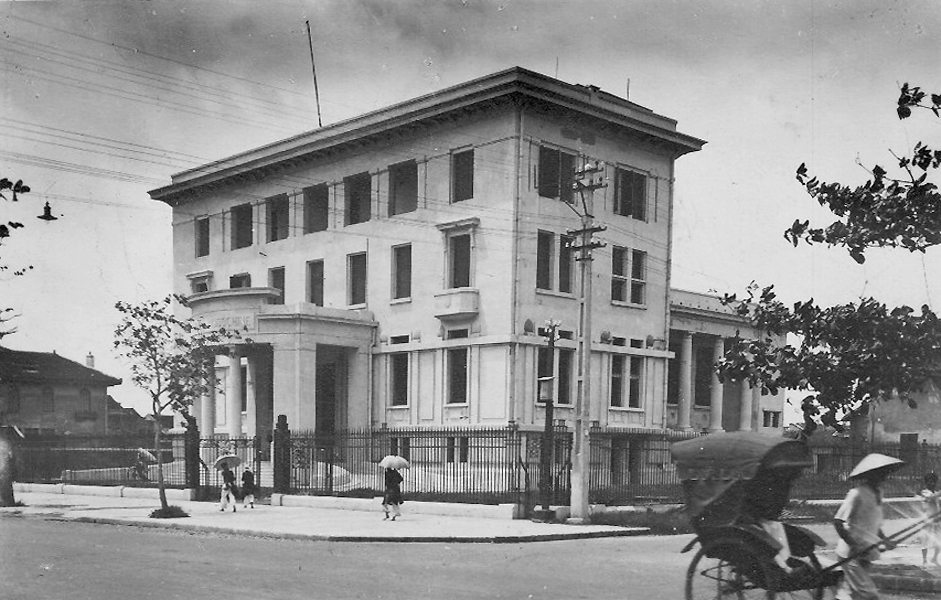
The Nam Dinh office shortly after completion

=== Thailand ===
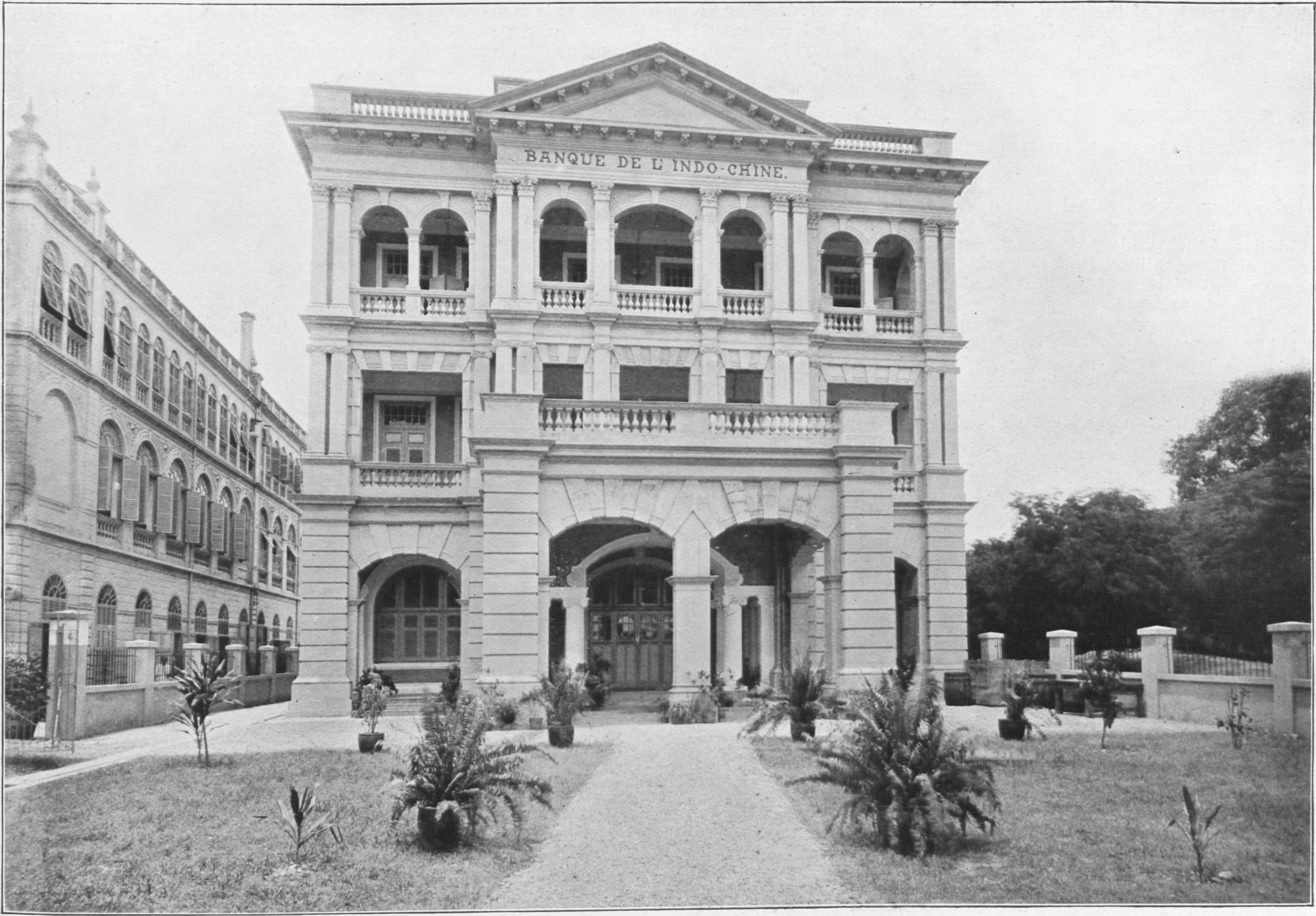
The Bangkok office in 1908

The branch building in Bangkok, in Bang Rak district, was completed in 1908. It was constructed by the engineering firm Howarth Erskine, and formed an imposing neoclassical edifice on the bank of the Chao Phraya River. It stands next to the East Asiatic Building at the end of Soi Charoen Krung 40, and now houses offices of the Roman Catholic Archdiocese of Bangkok.

=== China ===
The bank's building in Shanghai, on No.29 Bund, was completed in 1914 on a design by the local Atkinson & Dallas architecture firm. It is now the Shanghai Bund (Waitan) subbranch of China Everbright Bank.

The polychrome brick building of the Banque de l'Indochine in the French concession of Hankou, on the "French Bund" embankment of the Yangtze river, was constructed in 1901–1902 and has been carefully restored.

In the Legation Quarter of Beijing, the bank acquired the former building of the short-lived legation of the Korean Empire, which had closed in 1905, and established its office there in 1908. It rebuilt the office in Western classical style in 1917, on the same location.

The bank's building in the French concession of Tianjin was completed in late 1908. The Banque de l'Indochine kept staff there until the second half of the 1950s. It was later used as a venue by the Tianjin Fine Arts Museum.

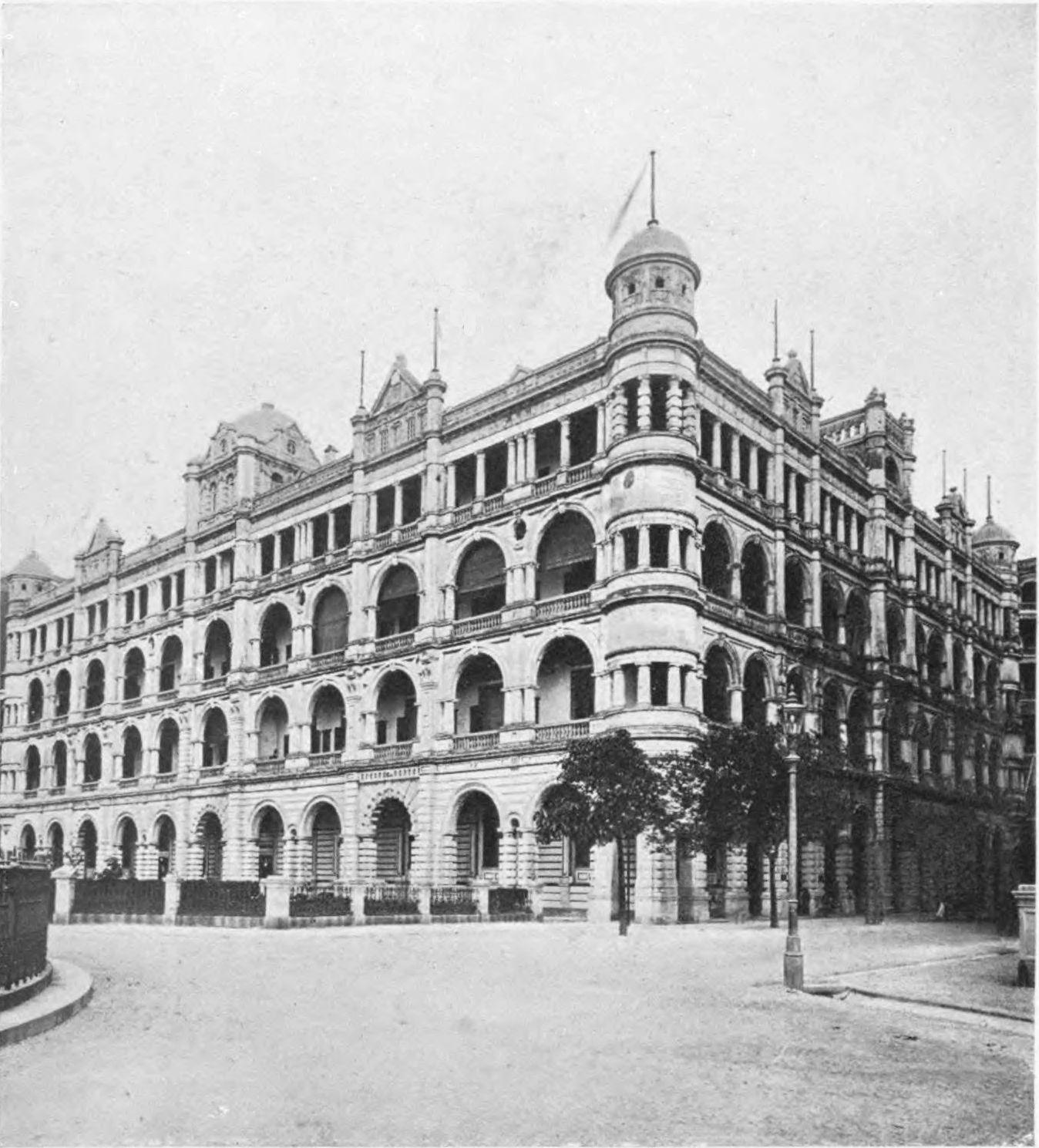
Prince's Building, where the Banque de l'Indochine had its office in Hong Kong

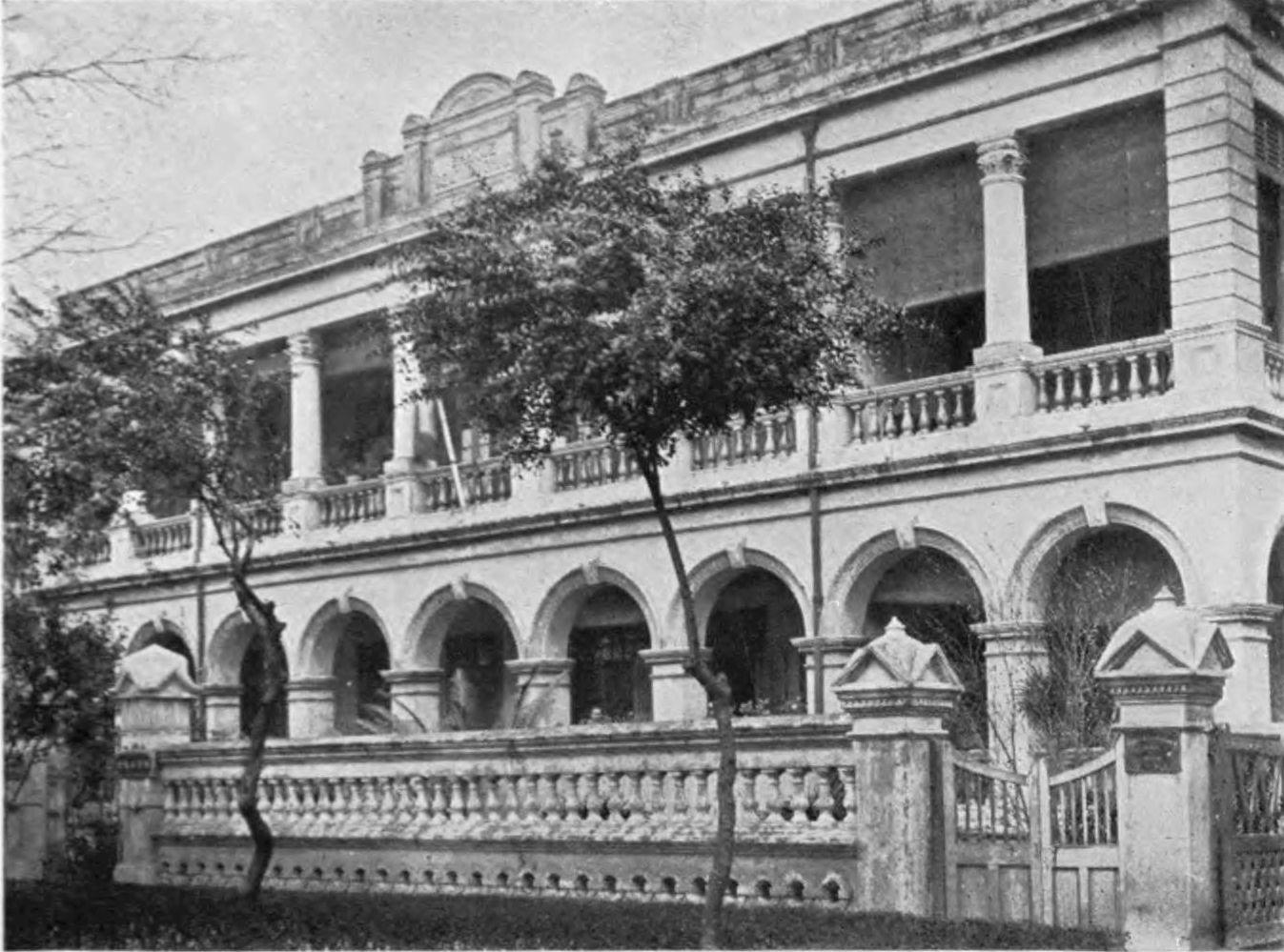
The bank's building on Shamian Island in Canton, 1908

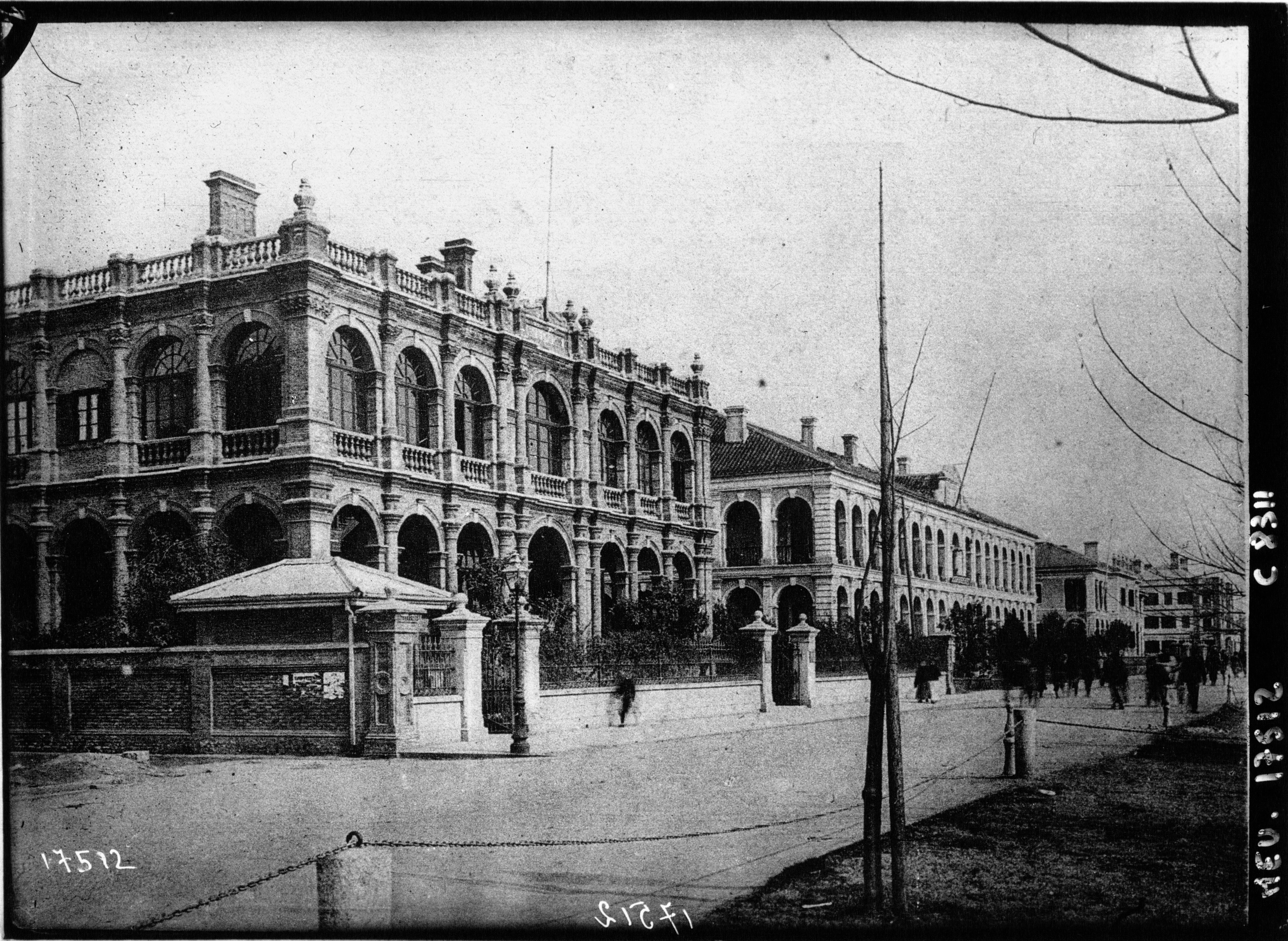
The Hankou office in 1911

=== India ===
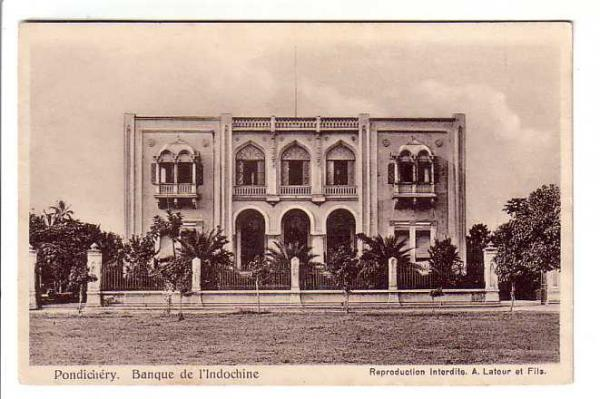
The Pondicherry branch, just after its completion in 1916

The bank's branch in Pondicherry was rebuilt in 1916 on the south side of the city's central Bharati Park. It is now the local office of UCO Bank.

=== French Polynesia ===
The bank's main branch in French Polynesia has been located on the same site, just south of Papeete's Notre Dame Cathedral, since its establishment in 1904. It has been rebuilt on several occasions.

=== Djibouti ===
In 1908, architect Faucon designed a building in traditional Yemeni style for the bank on Boulevard Bonhoure. In 1954, the bank relocated to a new international style office, which it had built on the site of the former Hotel de France nearby on 10, Place Lagarde. This building was later used and remodeled by the Banque pour le Commerce et l'Industrie – Mer Rouge, which in June 2020 sold it to Djibouti's National Social Security Fund (French: Caisse Nationale de Sécurité Sociale).

== Leadership ==
The bank's two key leadership positions were that of chairman (French: président) and chief executive or general manager (French: directeur). The latter was also often a member of the board (French: conseil d'administration), in which case he held the title of administrateur délégué.

=== Chairmen ===
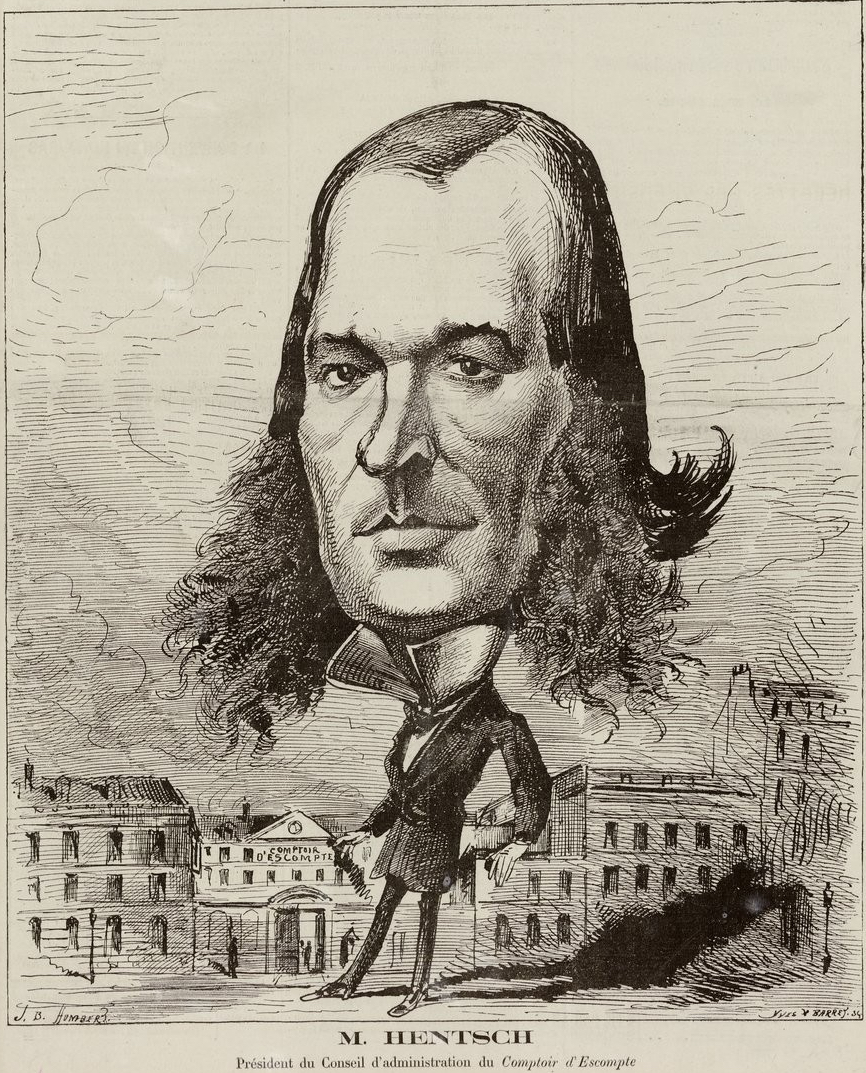
Cartoon of Édouard Hentsch (1829-1892), 1873

- Édouard Hentsch (January 1875-March 1889)
- Charles Sautter (March 1889-April 1892)
- Ernest Denormandie (June 1892-late 1889 or early 1900)
- Jean Hély d'Oissel (late 1889 or early 1900-June 1920)
- Albert Guillemin de Monplanet (June 1920-March 1927)
- Stanislas Simon (May 1927-July 1931)

Interim (July 1931-July 1932)

- René Jules Thion de la Chaume (July 1932-November 1936)
- Marcel Borduge (November 1936-February 1941)
- Paul Baudoin (February 1941-September 1944)
- Emile Minost (April 1945 – 1960)
- François de Flers (1960-1974)
- Jean Maxime-Robert (1974-1975)

=== Chief executives ===
- Pierre Girod (January 1875-March 1889), also board member and administrateur délégué from the bank's creation
- Stanislas Simon (March 1889-June 1920), also board member and administrateur délégué from May 1909, and chairman in 1927
- René Jules Thion de la Chaume (June 1920-July 1931), also board member from June 1930, administrateur délégué in 1931, and chairman in 1932
- Paul Baudoin (July 1931-March 1940), also board member from November 1936, and chairman in 1941
- Jean Laurent (March 1940-September 1952)
- François de Flers (October 1952 – 1960)
- Jean Maxime-Robert (1960-1974)

== Banknotes ==
In addition to its issuance privilege in French colonies, the Banque de l’Indochine, like other foreign banks in China at the time, issued paper currency in the concessions where it had established branch offices.

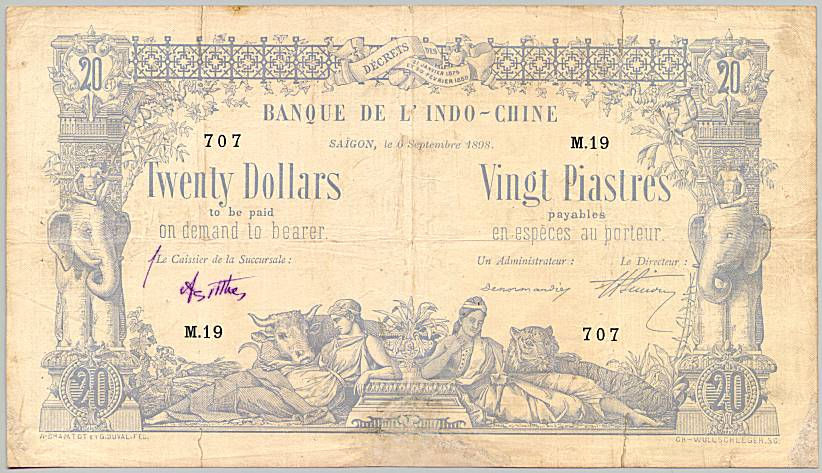
20 piastres (Indochina), 1898

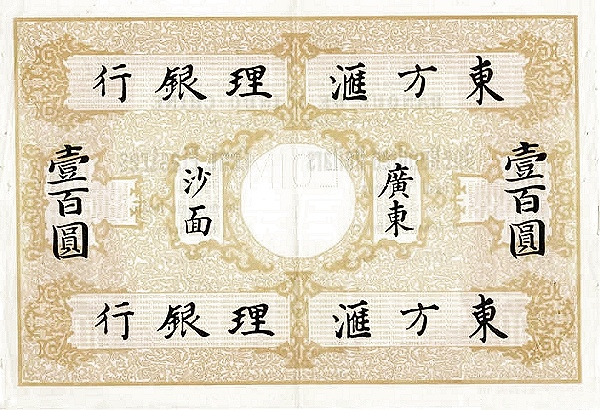
1 dollar/piastre (Canton), 1901

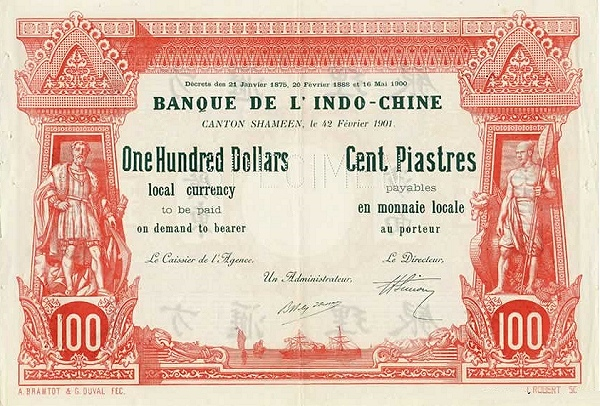
100 dollars/piastres (Canton), 1901

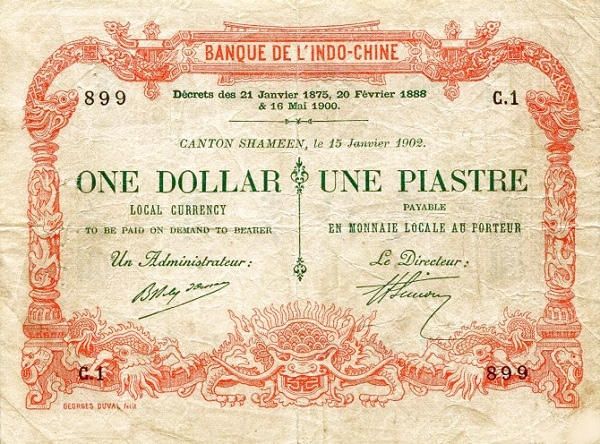
1 dollar/piastre (Canton), 1902

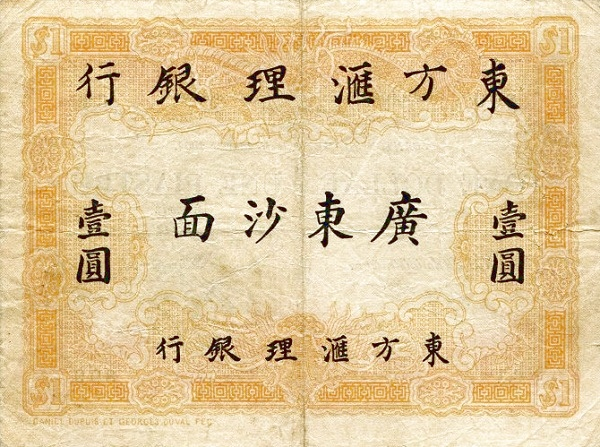
1 dollar/piastre (Canton), 1902

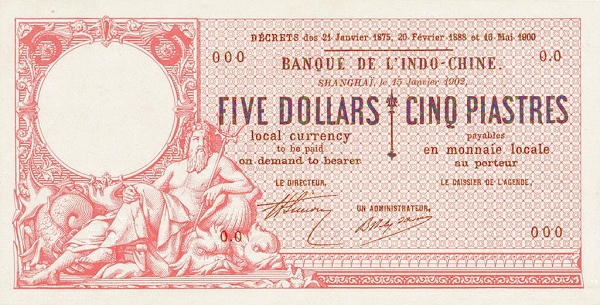
5 dollars/piastres (Canton), 1902

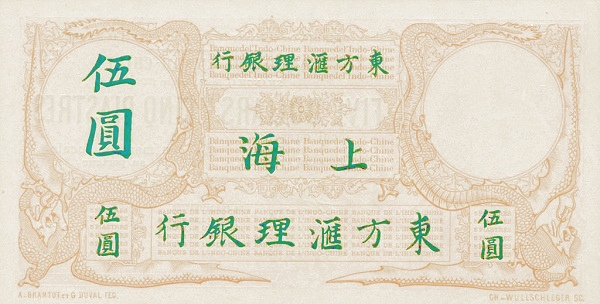
5 dollars/piastres (Canton), 1902

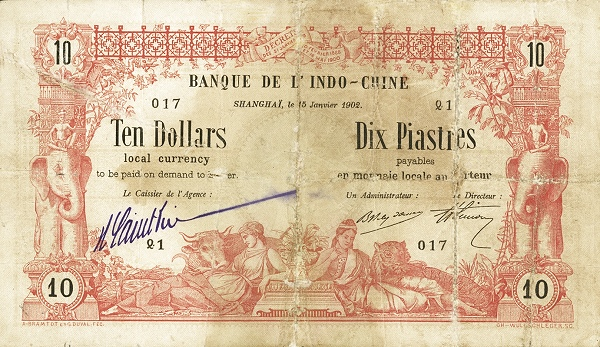
10 dollars/piastres (Canton), 1902

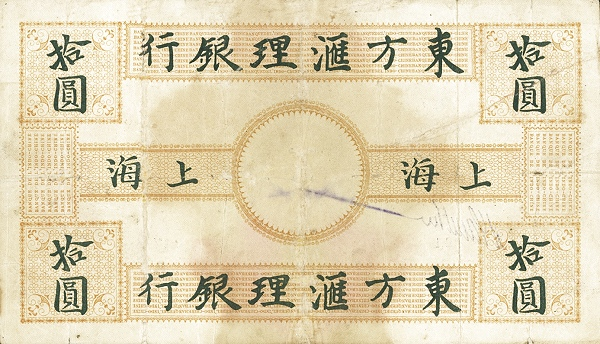
10 dollars/piastres (Canton), 1902

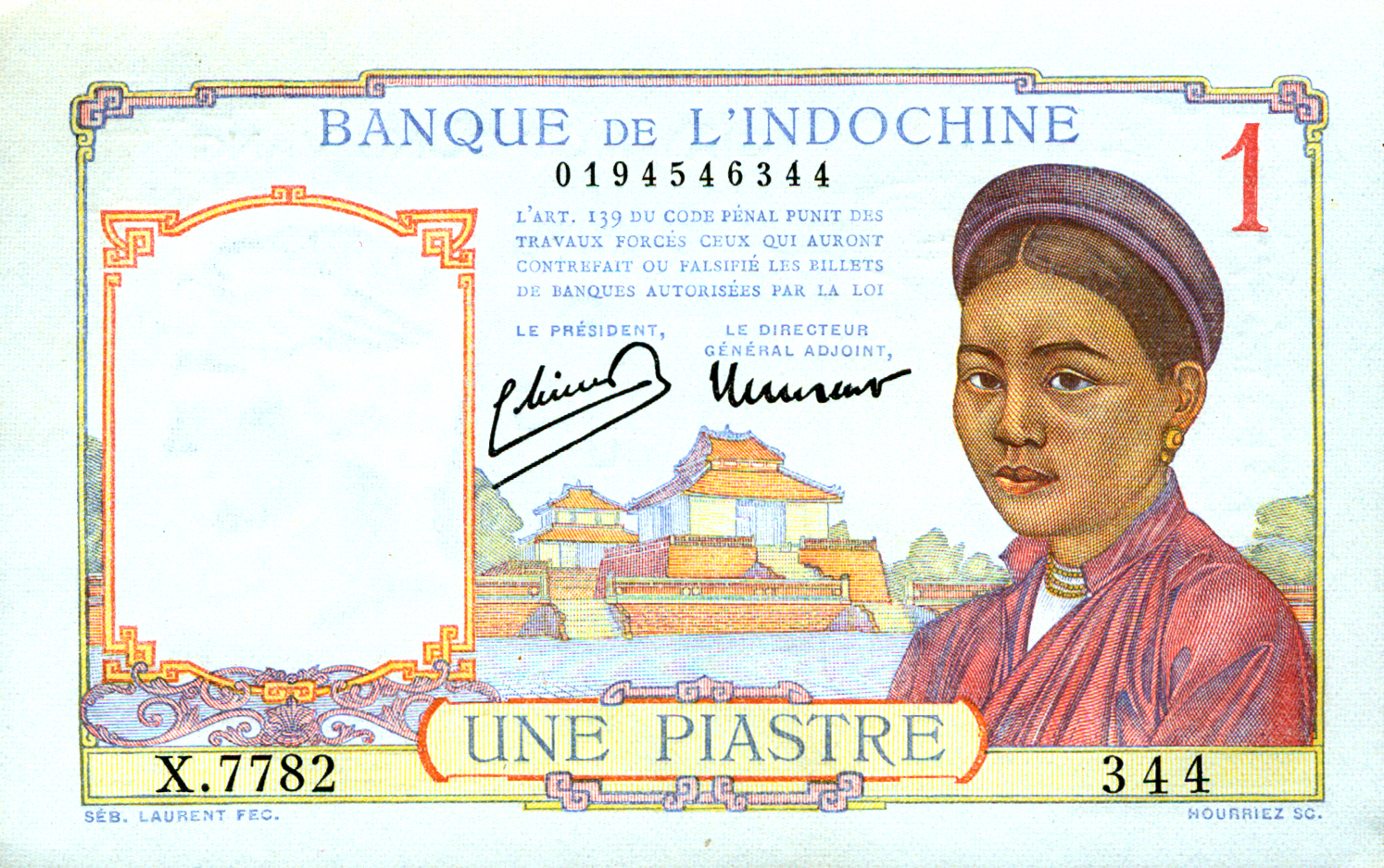
1 piastre (Indochina), 1930s

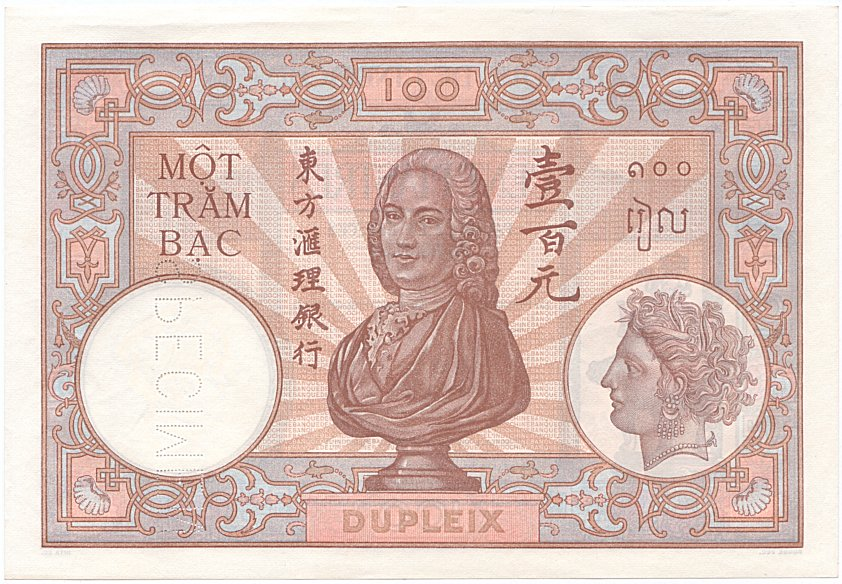
100 piastres (Indochina), 1932

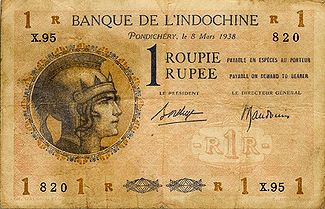
1 rupee (Pondicherry), late 1930s

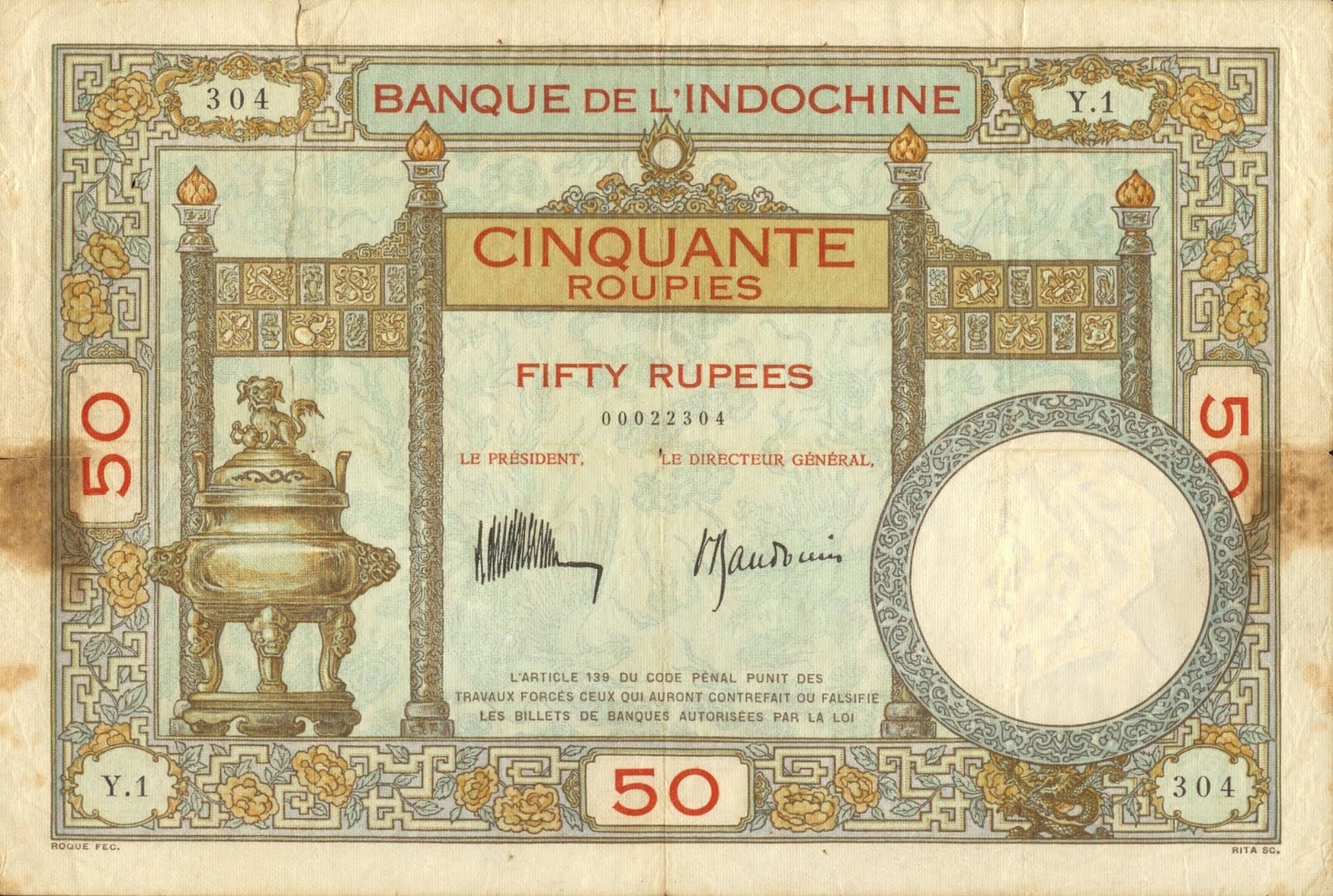
50 rupees (Pondicherry), early 1940s

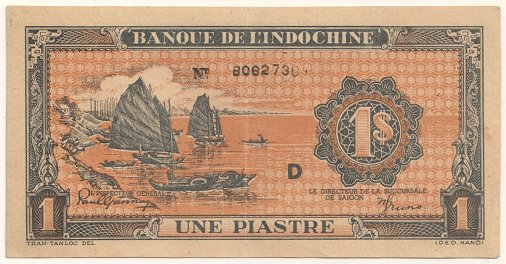
1 piastre (Indochina), 1942-1945

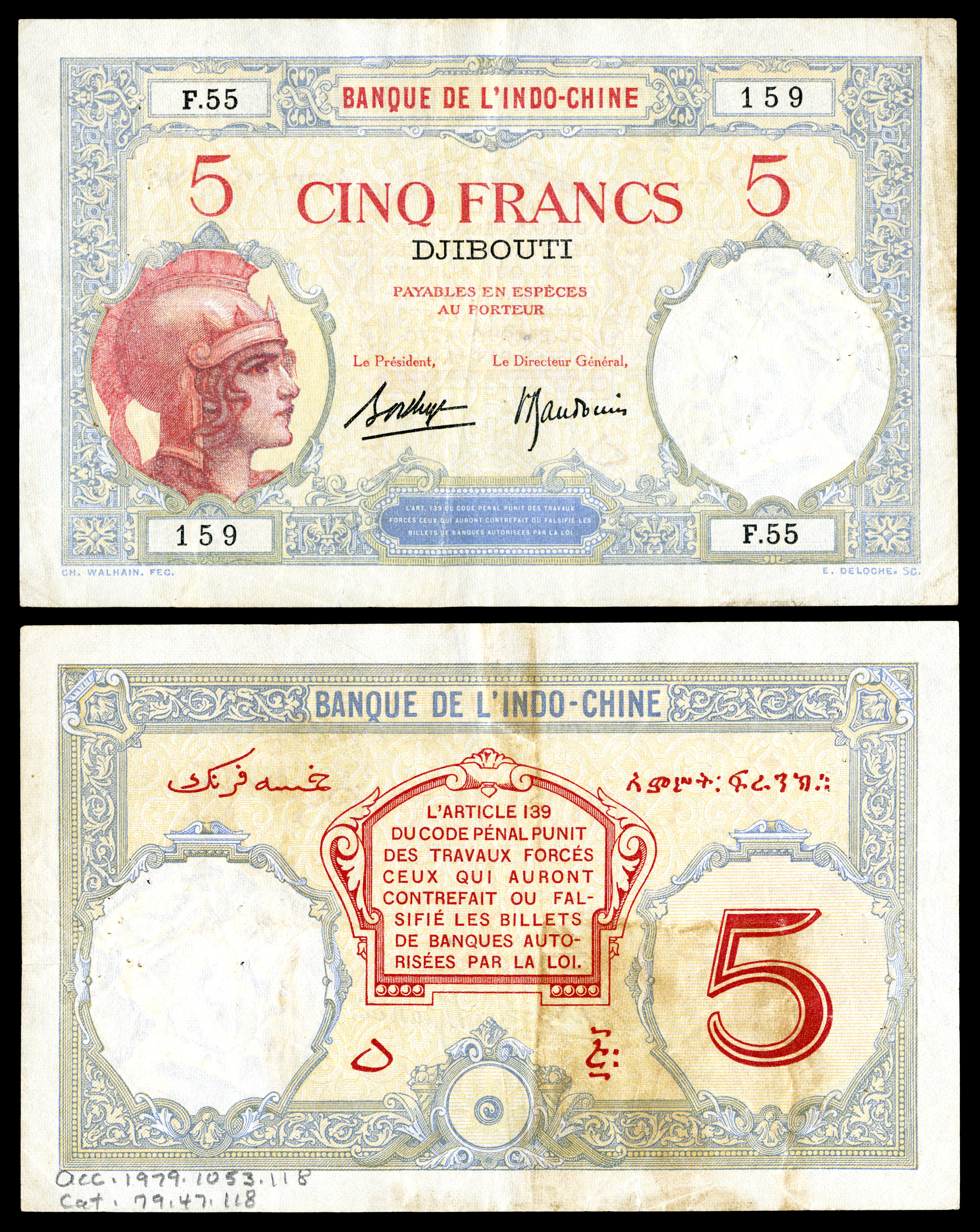
5 Francs (Djibouti), 1943

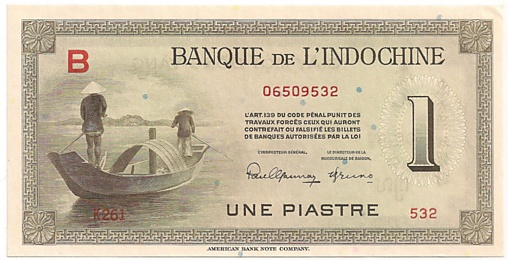
1 piastre (Indochina), 1951

== See also ==
- National Bank of Haiti
- Banque de l'Afrique Occidentale
- State Bank of Morocco
- Banque de Madagascar
- Société financière française et coloniale
- List of banks in France
