= Crédit Foncier de l'Indochine =

Former French colonial bank

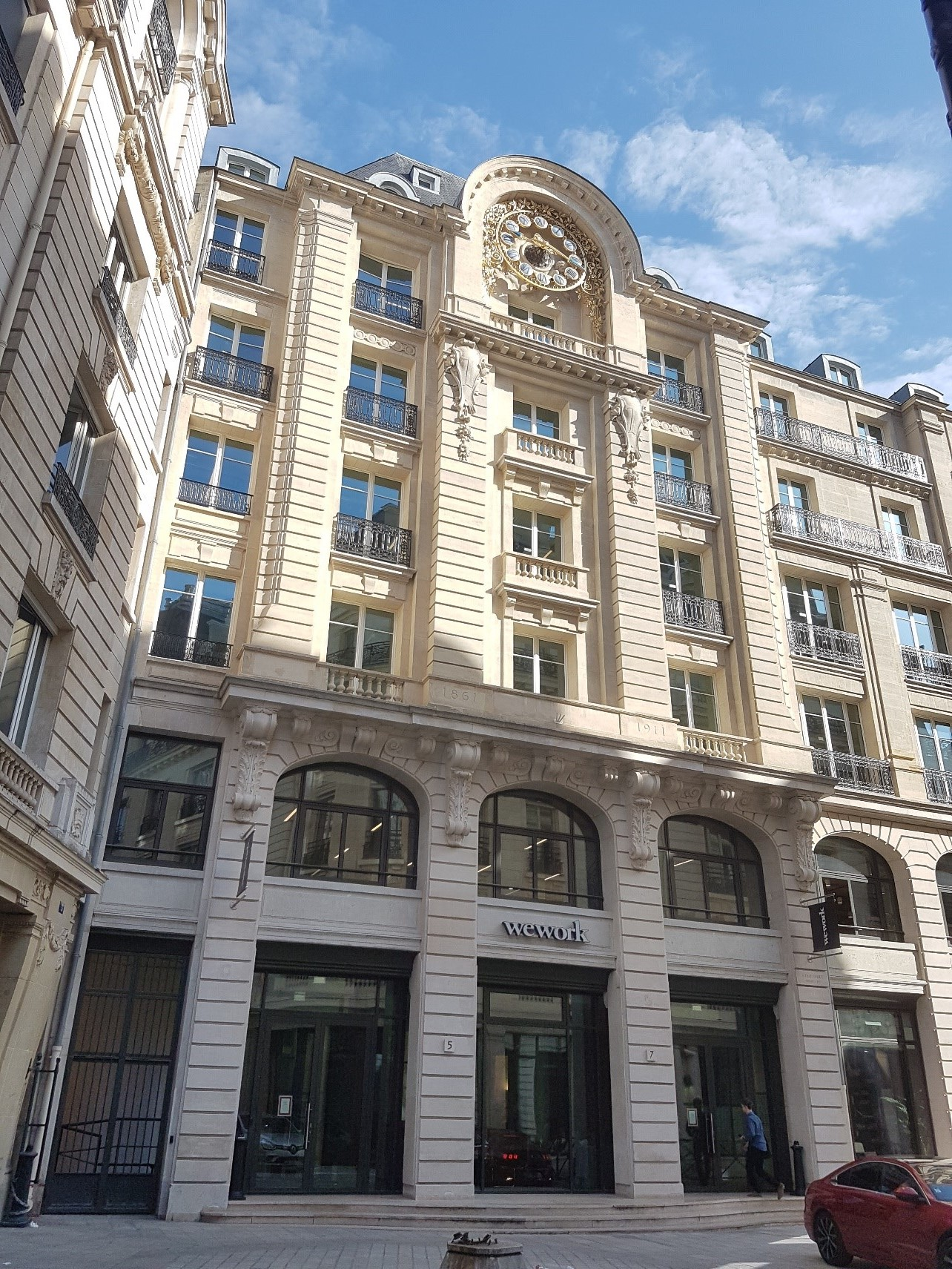
- The CFI's original head office at 7, rue des Italiens in Paris
- Company type: Public limited company
- Industry: Financial services
- Founded: 1923
- Founder: Octave Homberg
- Defunct: 1994
- Fate: Acquired
- Successor: Unibail
- Headquarters: Paris, France
- Area served: French Indochina, and France
- Products: Banking services, mortgages

The Crédit Foncier de l'Indochine (French pronunciation: [kʁedi fɔ̃sje də lɛ̃dɔʃin], lit. 'Mortgage Credit Bank of Indochina', abbr. CFI) was a colonial bank headquartered in Paris, France, with main operational office in Hanoi. Following France's loss of its Indochina colonies, it focused on property development and management in France, was renamed Crédit Foncier et Immobilier (lit. 'Land Mortgage and Property Bank') in 1957, then Compagnie Foncière Internationale (lit. 'International Property Company') in 1988, and eventually acquired by Unibail in 1994.

== History ==
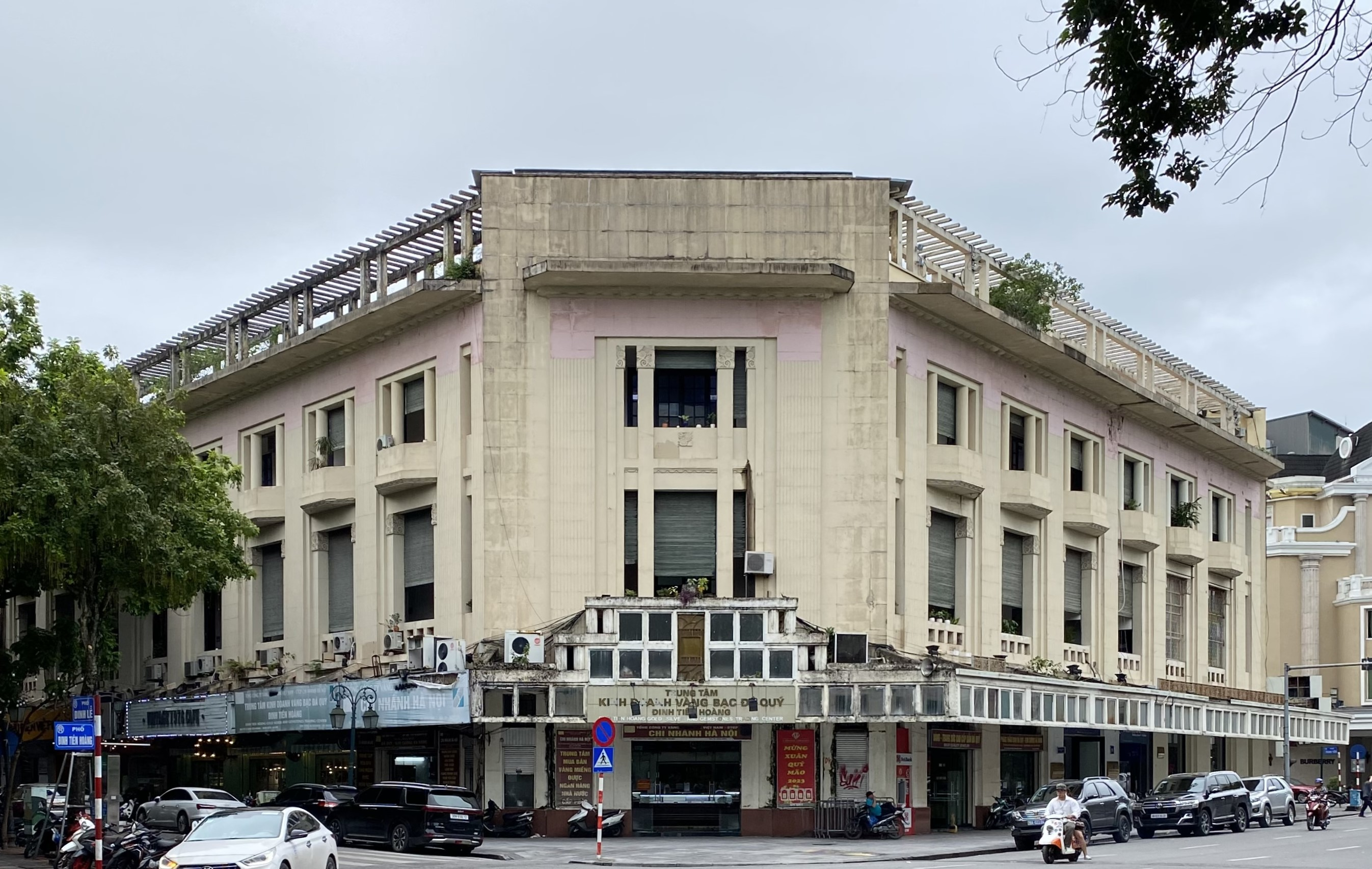
CFI building in Hanoi, completed in 1929

The Crédit Foncier de l'Indochine was created in 1923, with a capital of 6,000,000 francs. Its main sponsor was financier Octave Homberg through his Société Financière Française et Coloniale (SFFC), with support from the Banque de l'Indochine and the Brussels-based Crédit Foncier d'Extrême-Orient. Former colonial governor Ernest Roume became its chairman (French: président), and Homberg the deputy chairman. It was the first mortgage bank established in French Indochina, and became the preferred intermediary of the Banque de l'Indochine for construction and real estate in the territory. It soon opened agencies in Hanoi and Saigon, as well as a sub-agency in Haiphong, and later in the 1920s, in Phnom Penh.

In 1928, the CFI participated in the creation of the Crédit Foncier de l'Ouest Africain (CFOA) which was also initially led by Roume. That same year, it established a branch in Bangkok, which was eventually liquidated in 1935, and established a subsidiary, the Union Immobilière Indochinoise, which it absorbed back in 1937. In late 1929, it completed a major building at 89 boulevard Francis-Garnier (later Phố Đinh Tiên Hoàng) in Hanoi, which hosted retail outlets as well as its own offices and those of the SFFC. In 1936, it moved its Parisian head office to a new building at 9, rue Louis-Murat.

Following World War II, the CFI diversified its property portfolio beyond French Indochina, mostly in Metropolitan France and French Africa. In the early 1950s, it again moved to a new head office to 23, avenue Kléber in Paris. In 1954, it lost control of its assets and operations in North Vietnam. By end-1954, the CFI estimated that 60 percent of its assets (by value) were located outside of French Indochina.

In 1957, it was renamed as Crédit Foncier et Immobilier. From 1950 to the early 1970s, it developed around fifty mostly residential properties in France totalling nearly 450,000 square meters. In 1973, it absorbed the CFOA and another affiliate, the Saigon and African General Real Estate Company (COGISA). In 1975 it lost its last properties in Vietnam. Two years later, 90 percent of the CFI's assets were located in France.

In 1987, the CFI transferred nearly all its assets outside France into the Brussels-based Crédit Foncier International, which in 1959 had inherited the operations of the Crédit Foncier d'Extrême-Orient. Through a subsidiary, Études et Investissements Immobiliers, CFI owned most of the buildings of the European Community in Brussels, including the European Commission's Charlemagne building and the European Parliament's Belliard building. By then it also had properties in Spain, Morocco, and the United States.

In 1988, it was again renamed as Compagnie Foncière Internationale. By 1992, the Suez Company owned 55 percent of the CFI's equity. It delisted it the next year and merged it with the troubled Banque La Hénin. In 1994, French property company Unibail acquired majority control of CFI from Suez and integrated it into its operations.

== Leadership ==
- Ernest Roume, chairman 1923–1931
- René Thion de la Chaume, chairman 1931–1940
- Robert Goury du Roslan, chairman 1940–1958
- Émile Minost, chairman 1958-?

== See also ==
- Crédit Foncier de France
- Crédit Foncier d'Algérie et de Tunisie
- List of banks in France
