= René Jules Thion de la Chaume =

French fencer

Personal information
- Nationality: French
- Born: 28 May 1877; Le Vésinet, France
- Died: 3 January 1940 (aged 62); Paris, France

Sport
- Sport: Fencing

René Jules Thion de la Chaume (28 May 1877 – 3 January 1940) was a French fencer. He competed in the men's épée event at the 1900 Summer Olympics. A member of France's prestigious Inspection des Finances, he later pursued a career in banking, with major roles at the Banque de l'Indochine and Crédit Foncier de l'Indochine.
