= List of tallest structures in Morocco =

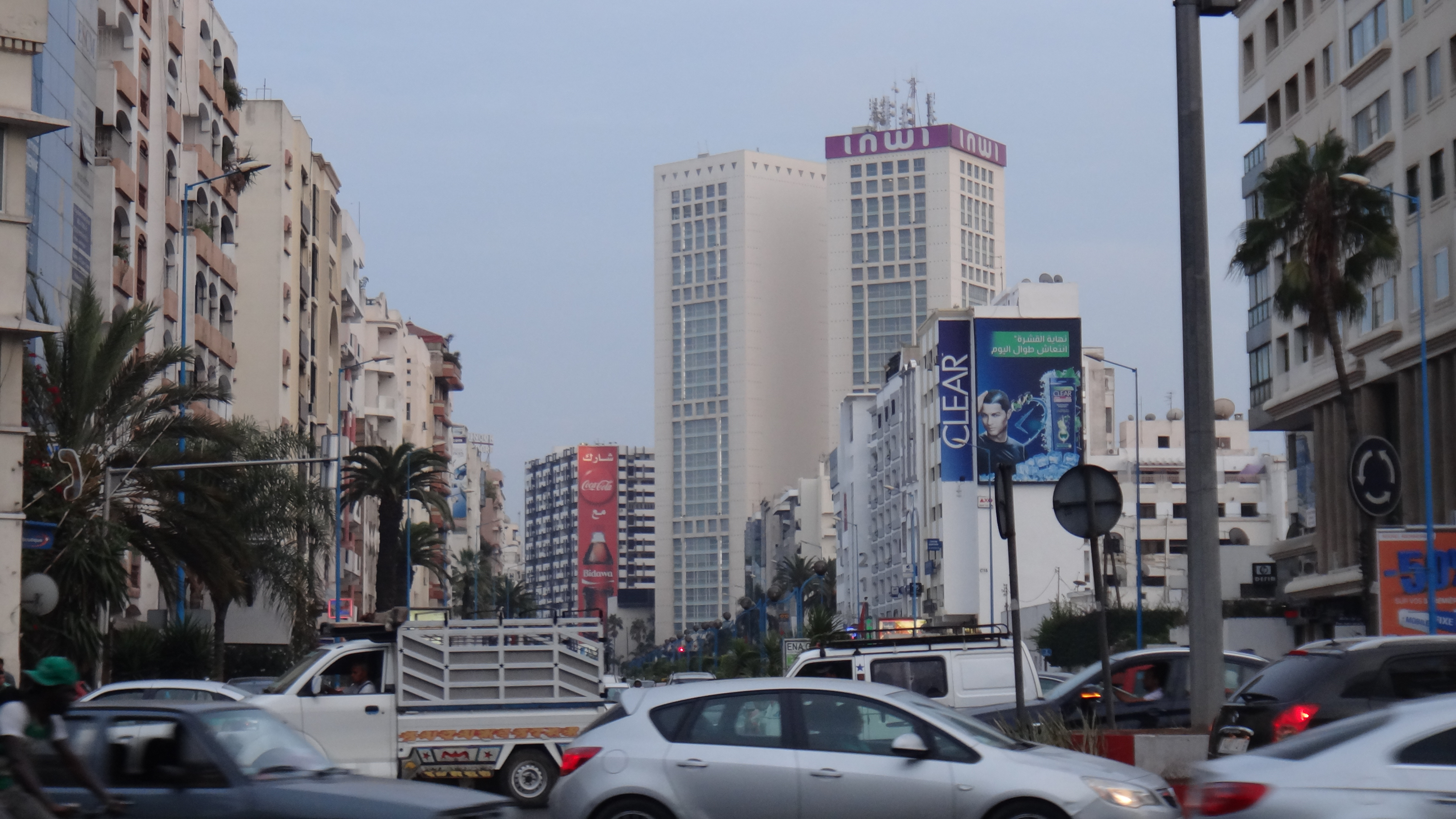
Maarif, Casablanca is home to the Casablanca Twin Center. The first skyscrapers in the country, and now a landmark.

This is a list of the tallest structures in Morocco, including dams and radio antenna as well as buildings. Many of the structures listed are located in Casablanca. This list contains completed and topped out structures located within Morocco that are over 50 metres (160 ft) in height. The list is sorted by official height; where two or more structures share the same height, equal ranking is given and the structures are then listed in alphabetical order. See List of tallest buildings in Morocco

== Tallest structures ==
Denotes structure that is or was once the tallest in Morocco
Denotes structure that is currently under construction

Rank	Name	Image	Location	Height m (ft)	Year	Structural Type	Main Usage	Remarks	Notes
1	Nador transmitter, Mast 1		Nador	380 metres (1,250 ft)	1972	Mast (Wired)	Radio Transmission		
1	Nador transmitter, Mast 2		Nador	380 metres (1,250 ft)	1972	Mast (Wired)	Radio Transmission		
2	Azilal longwave transmitter		Azilal	304.8 metres (1,000 ft)		Mast (Wired)	Radio Transmission		
3	Mohammed VI Tower		Salé	250 metres (820 ft)	55	2022	Commercial Office	The Mohammed VI Tower will become the tallest skyscraper in Morocco upon its completion. The tower is built by TGCC and Belgian company Besix.	
4	Noor III CSP Tower		Ourzazate	243 metres (797 ft)	2019	Solar Power Tower		Third tallest solar power tower in the world	
5	Hassan II Mosque		Casablanca	210 metres (690 ft)	1993	Mosque	Mosque	Second tallest mosque in the world	
6	Mohammed VI Bridge		Rabat	200 metres (660 ft)	2016	Bridge			
7	Sabaa Aiyoun longwave transmitter (1)		Sabaa Aiyoun	160 metres (520 ft)	1965	Mast (Wired)	Radio Transmission		
8	Ain Chock longwave transmitter (2)		Casablanca	157 metres (515 ft)		Mast (Wired)	Radio Transmission		
9	Hassan I Dam		Demnate	145 metres (476 ft)	1986	Dam			
10	Mohammedia Rafinery		Mohammedia	140 metres (460 ft)	1997	Chimney	Chimney	Tallest Chimney in Morocco	
11	Maroc Telecom HQ		Rabat	139 metres (456 ft)	2012	High-Rise	Commercial Office		
12	Casablanca Finance City Tower		Casablanca	136 metres (446 ft)	2019	Skyscraper	Commercial Office		
13	Bin el Ouidane Dam		Beni Mellal	133 metres (436 ft)	1953	Dam			
14	Safi Thermal Power Station		Safi	132 metres (433 ft)	2018	Chimney	Chimney	Second Tallest Chimney in Morocco	
15	Sabaa Aiyoun longwave transmitter (2)		Sabaa Aiyoun	128 metres (420 ft)	1965	Mast (Wired)	Radio Transmission		
16	Ain Chock longwave transmitter (1)		Casablanca	124.6 metres (409 ft)		Mast (Wires)	Radio Transmission		
17	Jorf Lasfar Thermal Power Station (3)		El Jadida	123 metres (404 ft)	2001	Chimney	Chimney	Third Tallest Chimney in Morocco	
17	Mohammedia Thermal Power Station (2)		Mohammedia	123 metres (404 ft)	2007	Chimney	Chimney	Fourth Tallest Chimney in Morocco	
17	Sidi Bounouara longwave transmitter		El Jadida	123 metres (404 ft)		Mast (Wired)	Radio Transmission		
18	Jerada Thermal Power Station 1 & 2		Jerada	122 metres (400 ft)	2017	Chimney	Chimney		
19	BCP Tower		Casablanca	120 metres (390 ft)	2022	Skyscraper	Commercial Office		
20	Jorf Lasfar Thermal Power Station (1)		El Jadida	118 metres (387 ft)	2001	Chimney	Chimney		
21	Mohammedia Thermal Power Station (1)		Mohammedia	117 metres (384 ft)	2007	Chimney	Chimney		
22	Casablanca Twin Center (East)		Casablanca	115 metres (377 ft)	1999	Building	Commercial Office, Hotel		
22	Casablanca Twin Center (West)		Casablanca	115 metres (377 ft)	1999	Building	Commercial Office, Hotel		
22	Hassan II Dam		Midelt	115 metres (377 ft)	2005	Dam	Dam		
23	AWB Tower		Casablanca	110 metres (360 ft)	2022	Skyscraper	Commercial Office		
23	Royal Mansour Hotel		Casablanca	110 metres (360 ft)	2022	Skyscraper	Hotel		
24	ANP Tower		Casablanca	105 metres (344 ft)	2021	Skyscraper	Commercial Office		
25	Sofitel Hotel Casablanca		Casablanca	95 metres (312 ft)	2011	High-Rise	Hotel		
26	Tour Habous		Casablanca	94 metres (308 ft)	1974	High-Rise	Commercial OfficeCommercial Office		
27	Al Wahda Dam		M'jaara	88 metres (289 ft)	1997	Dam			
28	Tour Végétal (Tour A)		Casablanca	85 metres (279 ft)	2018	High-Rise			
28	Tour Végétal (Tour B)		Casablanca	85 metres (279 ft)	2019	High-Rise	Residential		
29	Tiouine Dam		Ourzazate	84 metres (276 ft)	2013	Dam			
30	Al Massira Dam		Settat	82 metres (269 ft)	1979	Dam			
31	Novotel Hotel Casablanca		Casablanca	80 metres (260 ft)	2007	High-Rise	Hotel		
31	Tour Atlas Casablanca		Casablanca	80 metres (260 ft)	1971	High-Rise	Commercial Office		
32	Rue Sidi Belyout 30		Casablanca	78 metres (256 ft)		High-Rise	Residential		
33	Liberty Building		Casablanca	78 metres (256 ft)	1951	High-Rise	Residential		
34	Kutubiyya Mosque		Marrakesh	77 metres (253 ft)	1199	Mosque	Mosque		
35	Anfa Sky (Tower G)		Casablanca	74 metres (243 ft)	2017	High-Rise			
35	Résidence Saâda		Rabat	74 metres (243 ft)		High-Rise	Residential		
36	Idris I Dam		Fes	72 metres (236 ft)	1974	Dam			
37	Ibis Hotel		Casablanca	71 metres (233 ft)	2007	High-Rise	Hotel		
37	Immeuble OCE		Casablanca	71 metres (233 ft)		High-Rise	Commercial Office		
38	Résidence Shemsi		Casablanca	70.9 metres (233 ft)		High-Rise	Residential		
39	El Kansera Dam		Sidi Slimane	68 metres (223 ft)	1946	Dam			
40	Golden Tulip Hotel Farah Casablanca		Casablanca	67 metres (220 ft)		High-Rise	Hotel		
40	Grand Mogador City Center		Casablanca	67 metres (220 ft)	2010	High-Rise	Hotel		
40	Villas Paquet		Casablanca	67 metres (220 ft)	1952	High-Rise	Residential		
41	Mohamed V Dam		Zaio	64 metres (210 ft)	1967	Dam			
42	Ave des Forces Armées Royales 46		Casablanca	63 metres (207 ft)		High-Rise			
42	Ave des Forces Armées Royales 44		Casablanca	63 metres (207 ft)		High-Rise			
42	Ave des Forces Aucilliaires 30		Casablanca	63 metres (207 ft)		High-Rise			
42	BCNI		Casablanca	63 metres (207 ft)		High-Rise			
42	Crowne Plaza Casablanca Hotel		Casablanca	63 metres (207 ft)		High-Rise			
42	Idou Anfa Hotel		Casablanca	63 metres (207 ft)		High-Rise			
42	RMA Watanya 1		Casablanca	63 metres (207 ft)		High-Rise			
42	RMA Watanya 2		Casablanca	63 metres (207 ft)		High-Rise	Commercial Office		
42	Sheraton Casablanca		Casablanca	63 metres (207 ft)		High-Rise	Hotel		
42	Tour Oceanes 3		Casablanca	63 metres (207 ft)		High-Rise	Rental Apartments, Hotel		
43	The View Hotel & Forum		Rabat	62 metres (203 ft)	2016	High-Rise	Hotel		
44	Allal al Fassi Dam		Sefrou	61 metres (200 ft)	1991	Dam			
45	CIMR Tower		Casablanca	60 metres (200 ft)	2020	High-Rise	Commercial Office		
46	Ave des Forces Armées Royales 42		Casablanca	59.1 metres (194 ft)		High-Rise			
46	Ave des Forces Auxiliaries 28		Casablanca	59.1 metres (194 ft)		High-Rise			
46	Hotel Barcelo		Casablanca	59.1 metres (194 ft)		High-Rise	Hotel		
46	Résidence Anafe A		Casablanca	59.1 metres (194 ft)		High-Rise			
46	Résidence Anafe B		Casablanca	59.1 metres (194 ft)		High-Rise			
46	Résidence Ibn Zaidoun		Casablanca	59.1 metres (194 ft)		High-Rise	Residential		
46	Résidences Louise		Casablanca	59.1 metres (194 ft)		High-Rise			
46	The Park Anfa Condominium		Casablanca	59.1 metres (194 ft)		High-Rise			
47	ANCFCC		Rabat	58.3 metres (191 ft)	2019	High-Rise	Governmental Office		
48	Tour CDG		Rabat	58 metres (190 ft)		High-Rise	Governmental Office		
49	Palais Mirabeau		Casablanca	55.1 metres (181 ft)	1954	High-Rise	Residential		
50	El Kandara Hotel		Casablanca	51.2 metres (168 ft)	1986	High-Rise	Hotel		
50	Immeuble Al Wahda		Casablanca	51.2 metres (168 ft)		High-Rise	Commercial Office		
50	Romandie		Casablanca	51.2 metres (168 ft)	1952	High-Rise	Residential		
51	Tour Bâtiment Urbain		Fes	50 metres (160 ft)		High-Rise	Commercial Office, Residential		

=== Under construction ===
Rank	Name	Image	Location	Height m (ft)	Year	Structural Type	Main Use	Remarks	Notes
1	Nabrawind Wind Turbine			144 metres (472 ft)	2020	Wind Turbine			
2	Capital Tower Casablanca		Casablanca	80 metres (260 ft)	2022	High-Rise	Residential		
3	Bo 52, Tower I		Casablanca	63.02 metres (206.8 ft)	2021	High-Rise	Residential		
4	Le Meridien Marhaba - Casablanca		Casablanca	59.08 metres (193.8 ft)		High-Rise	Hotel		
5	Bo 52, Tower II		Casablanca	51.2 metres (168 ft)	2021	High-Rise	Residential		

=== Never built ===
The proposed Al Noor Tower would have been the tallest building in Africa, but was cancelled in 2018.

== See also ==
- List of tallest buildings in Morocco
- List of tallest skyscrapers in Morocco
