= List of tallest buildings in Morocco =

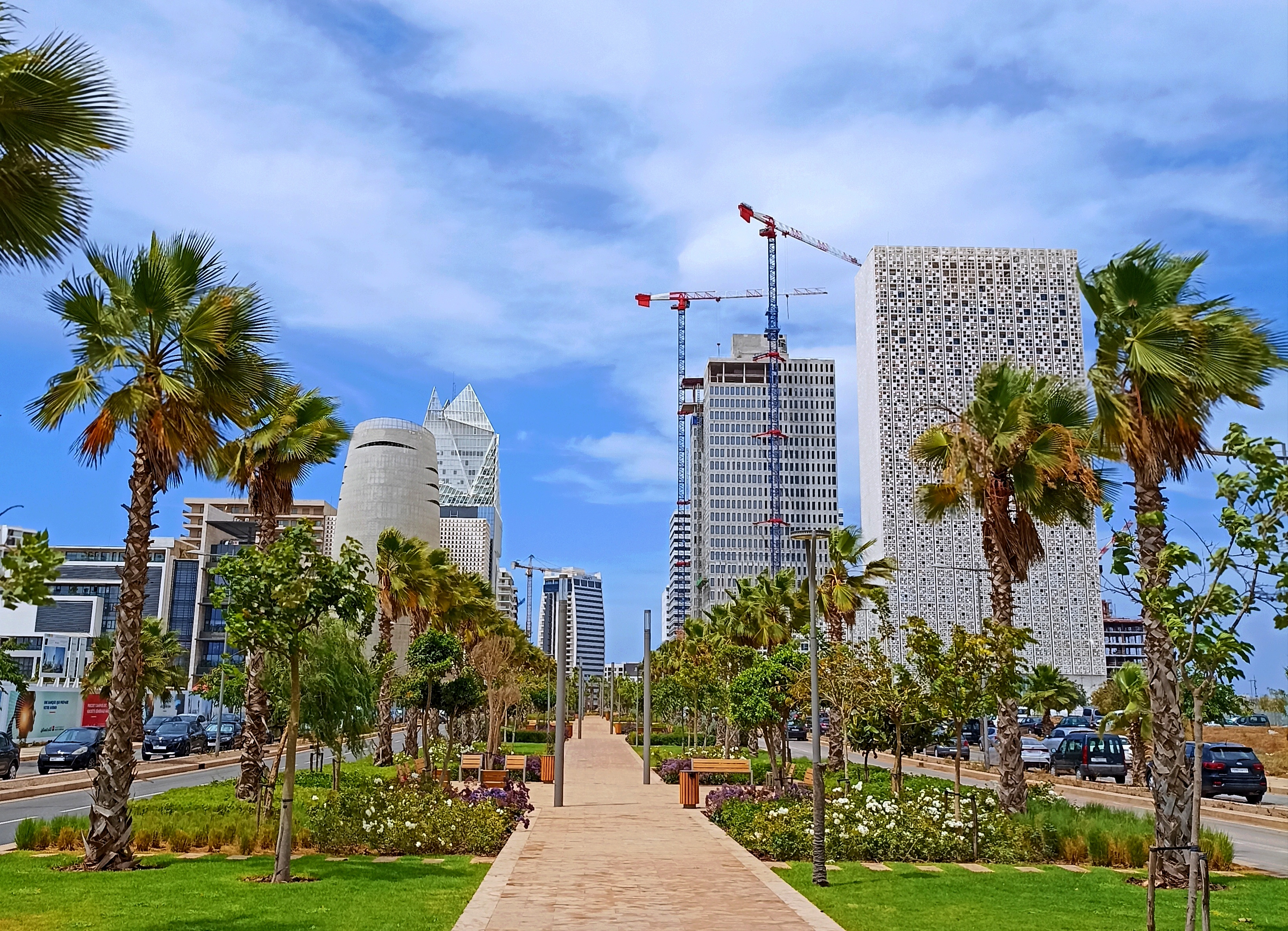
Casablanca Finance City skyline

A list of the tallest buildings in Morocco. Most of the buildings listed are located in Casablanca.

This list contains completed and topped out buildings located within Morocco that are over 100 m (328 ft) in height. The list is sorted by official height; where two or more buildings share the same height, equal ranking is given and the structures are then listed in alphabetical order.

== Tallest buildings ==
Denotes building that is or was once the tallest in Morocco

| Rank | Name | Image | Location | Height m (ft) | Floors | Year | Notes | References |
|---|---|---|---|---|---|---|---|---|
| 1 | Mohammed VI Tower | | Salé | 250 metres (820 ft) | 55 | 2026 | The tallest building in Morocco.; HQ of the Bank of Africa; The tower is built by TGCC and Belgian company Besix. | |
| 2 | Hassan II Mosque | | Casablanca | 210 metres (690 ft) | N/A | 1993 | The tallest building in Morocco from 1993-2025; The tallest minaret in the world from 1993-2019 | |
| 3 | Ibn Sina University Hospital | | Rabat | 150 metres (490 ft) | 33 | 2026 | The 6th tallest hospital in the world; The biggest hospital in Morocco with 1044 beds | |
| 4 | Maroc Telecom HQ | | Rabat | 139 metres (456 ft) | 20 | 2012 | HQ of Maroc Telecom | |
| 5 | Casablanca Finance City Tower | | Casablanca | 136 metres (446 ft) | 28 | 2019 | The tallest skyscraper in Morocco from 2019-2025; HQ of Casablanca Finance City Authority | |
| 6 | The Mohammed VI International University Hospital | | Rabat | 120 metres (393 ft) | 25 | 2025 | | |
| 7 | Casablanca Twin Center (East) | | Casablanca | 115 metres (377 ft) | 28 | 1999 | The first skyscrapers in Morocco; The tallest skyscrapers in Morocco from 1999-2019; The East Tower, which houses the Kenzi Tower Hotel, is the tallest hotel building in Morocco. | |
| 7 | Casablanca Twin Center (West) | | Casablanca | 115 metres (377 ft) | 28 | 1999 | The first skyscrapers in Morocco; The tallest skyscrapers in Morocco from 1999-2019; The East Tower, which houses the Kenzi Tower Hotel, is the tallest hotel building in Morocco. | |
| 8 | AWB Tower | | Casablanca | 114 metres (374 ft) | 27 | 2025 | HQ of the Attijariwafa bank. | |
| 9 | BCP Tower | | Casablanca | 105.4 metres (346 ft) | 27 | 2025 | HQ of the Banque Centrale Populaire. | |
| 10 | ANP Tower | | Casablanca | 105 metres (344 ft) | 25 | 2021 | HQ of the National Agency for Ports (ANP) | |

== Under construction ==
| Name | Location | Height m (ft) | Floors | Year | Notes | References |
|---|---|---|---|---|---|---|
| M Tower | Casablanca | 131 metres (430 ft) | 32 | 2027 | | |
| Shift Tower | Casablanca | +130 metres (430 ft) | 35 | 2026 | | |
| Walili Tower | Casablanca | +147 metres (482 ft) | 32 | 2026 | | |
| Cap Towers 1 | Tangier | +100 metres (330 ft) | 24 | | | |
| Cap Towers 2 | Tangier | +100 metres (330 ft) | 24 | | | |
| Cap Towers 3 | Tangier | +100 metres (330 ft) | 24 | | | |
| Cap Towers 4 | Tangier | +100 metres (330 ft) | 24 | | | |
| Cap Towers 5 | Tangier | +100 metres (330 ft) | 24 | | | |
| Cap Towers 6 | Tangier | +100 metres (330 ft) | 24 | | | |
| Cap Towers 7 | Tangier | +100 metres (330 ft) | 24 | | | |

== Tallest buildings by usage ==
| Category | Name | Location | Height m (ft) | Floors | Year |
|---|---|---|---|---|---|
| Mixed-use | Mohammed VI Tower | Salé | 250 metres (820 ft) | 60 | 2026 |
| Religious | Hassan II Mosque | Casablanca | 210 metres (690 ft) | | 1993 |
| Hospital | Ibn Sina University Hospital | Rabat | 150 metres (490 ft) | 33 | 2026 |
| Education | Ibn Sina University Hospital | Rabat | 150 metres (490 ft) | 33 | 2026 |
| Office | Casablanca Finance City Tower | Casablanca | 136 metres (446 ft) | 28 | 2019 |
| Hotel | Casablanca Twin Center (East Tower) | Casablanca | 115 metres (377 ft) | 24 | 2011 |
| Residential | King Peak Tower | Tangier | 84 metres (276 ft) | 20 | 2022 |

== See also ==
- List of tallest structures in Morocco
