= ESCA School of Management =

Coordinates: 33.5620°N 7.6622°W

- Type: Business school
- Established: 1992
- President: Thami Ghorfi
- Students: 1,100
- Location: Casablanca, Morocco
- Affiliations: Conference of Grandes Écoles of Morocco, Association to Advance Collegiate Schools of Business, European Foundation for Management Development, AABS, Global Business School Network
- Website: http://www.esca.ma/
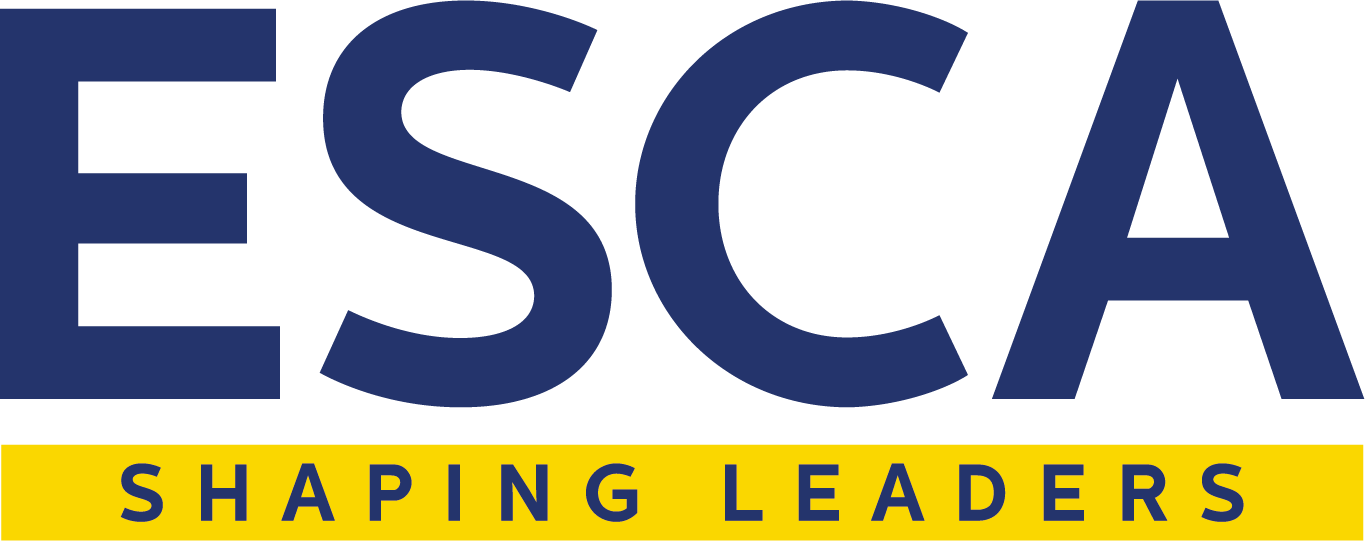

Founded in 1992, ESCA School of Management is a Moroccan business school located in Casablanca Finance City, Morocco. It is a member of the Conference of Grandes Écoles (Morocco) and international associations including AACSB, EFMD, AABS, and GBSN, and a signatory to the Principles for Responsible Management Education initiative of the United Nations.

The school has produced over 3,000 graduates and annually educates 1,100 students, executives, and leaders through its 17 national and international programs and ESCA Executive Education. ESCA collaborates with sixty international partners (universities and business schools in Europe, America, Asia, and Africa) and hosts international students and participants each year through exchange programs, seminars, and study trips.

Since 2010, ESCA School of Management has been ranked as the top Business School in Morocco and third in Africa in 2019 by the international rating agency Eduniversal. It has also been featured in the Jeune Afrique ranking of the best business schools in Francophone Africa, where it ranked first in 2013.
