= Casablanca Finance City Tower =

28-story office building in Casablanca, Morocco

- برج القطب المالي للدار البيضاء (Arabic)
- Interactive map of the Casablanca Finance City Tower area

General information
- Coordinates: 33.5635°N 7.661°W
- Construction started: 2016
- Completed: 2019
- Cost: $51,000,000

Height
- Height: 136 m (446 ft)

Technical details
- Floor count: 27 (+6 underground)
- Floor area: 21,000 m^{2} (226,000 sq ft)

Design and construction
- Architects: Morphosis Architects; Omar Alaoui Architectes
- Structural engineer: Thornton Tomasetti
- Services engineer: Tractebel Engineering
- Main contractor: Bouygues Construction

Website
- casablancafinancecity.com

Casablanca Finance City Tower (Arabic: برج القطب المالي للدار البيضاء, romanized: Burj al-Quṭb al-Mālī lldār al-Bayḍāʼ) also known as the CFC Tower is a 28–story office building in Casablanca, Morocco. Built between 2016 and 2019, the tower stands at 136 m (446 ft) tall and is the fourth tallest building in Morocco. It is located in the Casablanca Finance City, built at the site of the former Casablanca–Anfa Airport. It was designed by Morphosis Architects.

== History ==
The building designed by American architect Thom Mayne is an iconic building in the city and one of the tallest in the region. "CFC" stands for Casablanca Finance City, which highlights the building's role in the city's financial sector.

The CFC First Tower was completed in 2019 and stands at approximately 122 meters (446 feet) tall, making it one of the tallest skyscrapers in Casablanca . It mainly houses offices, the building is also equipped with modern facilities, services and amenities designed to meet the needs of businesses.

=== Architecture ===
The structure, 122 meters high, is composed of 25 floors, a mezzanine and 6 levels of underground parking 4 . The tower's design is modern, with distinctive architecture and glass facades. It offers panoramic views of the city and the coast from its upper floors. The CFC Fist Tower is located in Casablanca 's business district, providing easy access to the city's businesses, hotels and services.

== See also ==
- List of tallest buildings in Morocco
- List of tallest buildings in Africa
- Casablanca Finance City
