= BCP Tower =

Skyscraper in Casablanca, Morocco

- Tour de la Banque Centrale Populaire (French)
- Interactive map of the BCP Tower area

General information
- Status: Completed
- Type: Office
- Location: Casablanca, Morocco, Siege de la Banque Populaire, Anfa Lot 64, Casablanca, Morocco
- Coordinates: 33.56125°N 7.66027°W
- Construction started: 2022
- Completed: 2023
- Owner: Banque Centrale Populaire

Height
- Roof: 120 m (390 ft)

Technical details
- Structural system: Concrete
- Floor count: 27
- Floor area: 23,957 m^{2} (258,000 sq ft)

Design and construction
- Architects: Groupe 3 Architectes; Cabinet Rachid Andaloussi
- Structural engineer: TESS Engineering

The BCP Tower (abbreviated from French: Tour de la Banque Centrale Populaire) is a high-rise office building located Casablanca Finance City, Casablanca, Morocco. Built between 2022 and 2023 and named after BCP Group, the tower stands at 120 m (390 ft) tall with 27 floors and is the current 5th tallest building in Morocco as well as the second tallest in Casablanca.

== History ==
=== Architecture ===
The project consists of 2 simple, parallelepiped volumes, formed by the 5-storey podium on the ground and the 27-storey Tower attached to it. The two main façades face north and south. They are treated differently in order to adapt to this situation:

The north façade consists of a double skin in large blocks (2.70 m wide by 3.6 m high). The inner skin consists of glazed frames on a mixed opaque and glazed sill (fire barrier), while the outer skin offers a single large glass panel. A hollow joint on each floor allows ventilation of the air gap and the sill ensures the C+D between floors by masking the plenum with the opaque part while maintaining the view thanks to the glazed sill.

The southern façade, more exposed to sunlight, is protected behind a mesh of moucharabieh made of GRC concrete. The pattern of these square panels, 1.80 m on each side, varies according to the distribution of solids and voids and the more or less dense mesh of their frame. The interior façade, set back, is composed of classic full-height glazed frames, 1.35 m wide. The blind gables use the same type of pattern on the GRC cladding, except that the panels are completely solid.

This approximately 24,000 m^{2} (258,000 sq ft) IGH building is designed according to international environmental standards through LEED certification.

== See also ==
- List of tallest buildings in Morocco
- List of tallest buildings in Africa
