= Al Noor Tower =

Cancelled 540 meters skyscraper that was to be built in Casablanca, Morocco

General information
- Status: Proposed
- Type: Office and Hospitality
- Location: Casablanca, Morocco
- Owner: Sheikh Tarek M. Binladen (MED - Dubai - UAE)

Height
- Roof: 540 metres (1,800 ft)

Technical details
- Floor count: 114

Design and construction
- Architects: Denis Valode (Valode & Pistre - Paris FR)

Website
- www.alnoortower.com

The Al Noor Tower is a cancelled 540-meter skyscraper in Casablanca, Morocco. Had it been completed, it would have been the tallest building in Africa. The concept of the tower was created by a French designer, Amédée Santalo, who was based in Dubai. The design was commissioned by Sheikh Tarek bin Laden, the half brother of Osama bin Laden. The project was canceled in 2018.

== See also ==
- List of tallest buildings in Morocco
- List of tallest buildings in Africa
