= Mohammed VI Tower =

Skyscraper in Salé, Morocco

- برج محمد السادس

- Mohammed VI Tower in 2025
- Former names: BMCE Tower

General information
- Status: Completed
- Architectural style: Modern (exterior) Moroccan (interior)
- Location: Salé, Morocco, 34°01′08″N 6°48′19″W
- Construction started: July 2017
- Completed: 2025
- Opened: April 2026
- Cost: 3.5 billion MAD

Height
- Height: 250 metres

Technical details
- Floor count: 55
- Floor area: 102,800 m^{2}
- Lifts/elevators: 40

Design and construction
- Architects: Rafael de la Hoz, Hakim Benjelloun
- Main contractor: TGCC; BESIX; Six Construct; China Railway Construction Corporation

Website
- mohammedvitower.ma

The Mohammed VI Tower (Arabic: برج محمد السادس) is a 55-story, 250 m (820 ft) mixed-use skyscraper in Salé, Morocco, on the right bank of the Bou Regreg River, opposite Rabat, the country's capital. It is the tallest building in Morocco and one of the tallest buildings in Africa. The tower contains a luxury hotel, premium office space, high-end residences, commercial and cultural facilities, and a panoramic observation deck.

The project was initiated by Moroccan businessman Othman Benjelloun, chairman of Bank of Africa, and was developed by O TOWER, a joint venture between Bank of Africa, RMA and O CAPITAL Group. The project was initially known as the BMCE Tower, reflecting the former name of Bank of Africa, before being renamed the Mohammed VI Tower. Conceived as a landmark development within the Bou Regreg Valley project, the tower combines financial, commercial, residential, hospitality and cultural uses within a single development.

The tower was designed by Spanish architect Rafael de La-Hoz in collaboration with Moroccan architect Hakim Benjelloun. Its construction officially began on 1 November 2018, following several years of preliminary geological, technical, architectural and environmental studies and the laying of its foundation stone on 9 March 2016. Construction was carried out by a joint venture between Belgian contractor BESIX and Moroccan contractor TGCC under a design-and-build contract. The building was completed and handed over in March 2026, and was officially inaugurated on 13 April 2026 by Crown Prince Moulay Hassan, on behalf of King Mohammed VI of Morocco.

== History ==
The Mohammed VI Tower originated as a project initiated by Moroccan businessman Othman Benjelloun, chairman of Bank of Africa, for a new headquarters for the banking group.

In 2013, the Bank of Africa group, then known as BMCE Group, signed an agreement with the Anfa urbanization and development agency (AUDA) to develop the project in the new Casablanca Finance City district.

In 2014, Benjelloun presented the model of the proposed BMCE Tower, describing the project as a rocket-shaped structure intended to symbolize the bank's ambitions:

“A tower that I wanted represented by a rocket. This rocket will carry thousands of executive members and employees of the BMCE group to space. This Rocket will be ready for take-off from a Launch Pad, also represented in this project."

The project was originally intended for Casablanca Finance City and was initially planned as the new headquarters of the banking group. The proposed height was subsequently increased as the project evolved. In 2016, the project was relocated to Salé and renamed the Mohammed VI Tower, with the programme expanded beyond its original headquarters function.

On 9 March 2016, King Mohammed VI laid the foundation stone for the project in Salé, marking the beginning of its development at its new location.

The project subsequently underwent several years of preparatory work before the official construction launch in November 2018. The development was undertaken through O TOWER, with the project becoming a major landmark of the Bou Regreg Valley development.

The Mohammed VI Tower was completed in 2026 and formally opened in April of that year. On 5 May 2026, the tower's flagship hotel, Waldorf Astoria Rabat–Salé, welcomed its first guests. Operated by Hilton Worldwide, the hotel has 55 rooms, five dining venues and a spa.

== Architecture and design ==
The Mohammed VI Tower was conceived as a slender vertical landmark combining a distinctive silhouette with advanced structural and environmental systems. Its overall form was inspired by a rocket poised for launch, symbolizing movement and forward momentum. The design was commissioned from Rafael de La-Hoz and Hakim Benjelloun in 2014 by Othman Benjelloun through O TOWER. The tower rises from a multi-level podium and tapers towards its upper section, culminating in a crown containing observation facilities. Its height makes it visible from distances of around 50 kilometres across the Rabat–Salé metropolitan area.

The building has a total floor area of approximately 102,800 m² and comprises 55 floors. Its mixed-use programme includes offices, high-end residences, a luxury hotel and public and cultural facilities. The lower levels accommodate office and public functions, while residential and hospitality uses occupy much of the middle and upper portions of the tower. The uppermost levels contain observation and panoramic facilities. The four-level podium accommodates restaurants, reception areas, conference facilities, commercial spaces and other public amenities.

The tower employs a hybrid structural system combining a high-strength reinforced-concrete core with an external steel frame. The core accommodates the building's principal technical and vertical circulation functions, while the external structure contributes to the distribution of lateral loads. The arrangement was designed to provide structural resilience against strong winds and seismic activity while allowing large, naturally lit floor areas.

The façades are differentiated according to orientation. The northern façade uses a modular curtain-wall system designed to provide extensive glazed areas and natural light, while the southern façade incorporates a double-skin system with integrated photovoltaic panels. The photovoltaic elements cover several thousand square metres and contribute to the building's energy performance. The tower's façades cover more than 70,000 m² in total and incorporate glass, metal and environmental-control systems.

A tuned mass damper is installed near the top of the tower to reduce the effects of wind-induced movement and improve occupant comfort, particularly on the upper floors. The tower's foundations were designed to address the geotechnical conditions of the site and its proximity to the Bou Regreg River. They extend approximately 60 metres below ground and consist of 104 concrete barrettes supporting a thick reinforced-concrete raft.

The interior design was developed by French designer Pierre-Yves Rochon and combines contemporary interiors with Moroccan craftsmanship and decorative elements inspired by local heritage. Public and private spaces incorporate large doors, sculptures, murals and carved plasterwork, alongside a collection of approximately 7,000 artworks and decorative works by around 143 Moroccan and international artists and artisans.

The upper section contains the Rabat–Salé Heritage Observatory on the 50th floor, offering panoramic views of the two cities and the Bou Regreg Valley. The 51st floor houses a permanent exhibition titled The Sky Speaks Arabic, dedicated to the contributions of Arab and Andalusian civilisation to astronomy and related fields. Other cultural facilities include a library, conference facilities and exhibition spaces.

The tower incorporates a range of environmental measures, including photovoltaic power generation, rainwater harvesting, wastewater recycling and energy-recovery systems. These measures contributed to the building's LEED Gold and HQE certifications.

== Construction ==
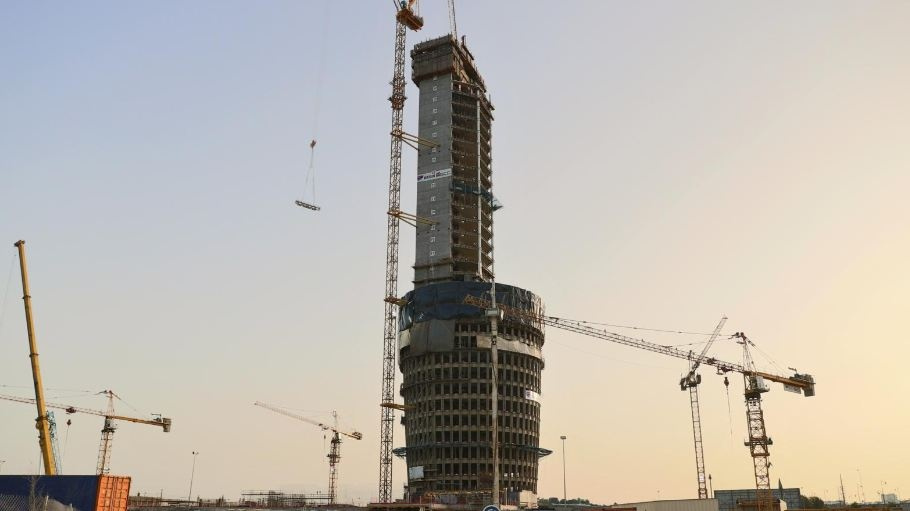
Mohammed VI Tower under construction in 2021.

Preliminary work on the project included geological, technical, architectural and environmental studies. The foundation stone was laid on 9 March 2016, while the official construction launch took place on 1 November 2018 on the right bank of the Bou Regreg River in Salé.

O TOWER was responsible for the development of the project, while construction was undertaken by BESIX and TGCC under a design-and-build contract. The contract covered design, engineering, procurement and construction, including the structural works, façades, electromechanical systems, interior finishes and other building systems.

The site's geotechnical conditions presented a major engineering challenge. The ground consists of layers of sand and silt, with no shallow bedrock suitable for supporting a structure of this height. The tower therefore rests on deep foundations extending approximately 60 metres underground, comprising 104 concrete barrettes capped by a reinforced-concrete raft approximately 3.5 metres thick. The construction also required extensive dewatering and the creation of a waterproofed basement because the groundwater level was above the basement level.

The structural system combines reinforced concrete and structural steel. The concrete core provides the principal lateral resistance, while the external steel structure contributes to the overall stability and load distribution. Approximately 9,800 tonnes of structural steel were used in the project, while the foundations required approximately 26,000 m³ of concrete.

Construction progressed through several stages. By 2021, the foundations had been completed, while the podium was approximately 90% complete and the steel structure had reached about 50% completion. The concrete core had also reached a significant height as construction of the tower progressed. The project was ultimately completed and handed over on 30 March 2026.

== Location ==
The Mohammed VI Tower stands on the right bank of the Bou Regreg River in Salé, within the Rabat-Salé-Kénitra region of Morocco, directly across the river from Rabat. It forms the centrepiece of the Bouregreg Valley Development Project and occupies a prominent position within the urban area linking the two cities.

Its location provides extensive views over Rabat, Salé, the Bou Regreg Valley and the Atlantic Ocean. The tower is visible from approximately 50 kilometres away, making it a prominent feature of the metropolitan skyline.

The area surrounding the tower was developed as part of the wider Bouregreg Valley project, with landscaped spaces, pedestrian areas, seating areas and water features incorporated around the building. The development also provides direct access to the Bou Regreg waterfront.

== Opening ==
The Mohammed VI Tower was completed in early 2026, with BESIX announcing the formal handover of the project on 30 March 2026. It was officially inaugurated on 13 April 2026 by Crown Prince Moulay Hassan, acting on behalf of King Mohammed VI, during a ceremony held at the tower on the right bank of the Bou Regreg River.

During the inauguration, the Crown Prince visited the main lobby, conference facilities and library, as well as a model apartment, the tower's hotel and the Rabat–Salé Heritage Observatory. The building's programme includes the Waldorf Astoria Rabat–Salé hotel, offices, high-end residences, restaurants, commercial facilities, conference spaces and cultural and artistic venues.

The upper observation facilities form a major public component of the tower. The 50th-floor observatory provides panoramic views of Rabat and Salé, while the 51st floor houses the permanent The Sky Speaks Arabic exhibition, giving the building a cultural and tourist function in addition to its commercial, residential and hospitality uses.

== See also ==
- List of tallest buildings in Morocco
- List of tallest buildings in Africa
- List of tallest buildings in the world
- List of future tallest buildings
- List of tallest buildings
- Hassan II Mosque
