= BCP Group =

Moroccan bank

- BCP Tower, Casablanca Finance City
- Type: Public
- Traded as: CSE: BCP
- Industry: Finance
- Founded: May 25, 1926; 100 years ago
- Headquarters: Casablanca, Morocco
- Products: Banking; Asset management; Commodities; Credit cards; Equities trading; Investment management; Mortgage loans; Private equity; Wealth management
- Revenue: ▲DH 20,1 billion (2021)
- Net income: ▲DH 2,7 billion (2021)
- Total assets: ▲DH 465 billion (2021)
- Website: groupebcp.com

BCP Group, also referred to as Banque Populaire or Chaabi, is a Moroccan international financial services group headquartered at the BCP Tower in Casablanca.

The acronym BCP stands for the group's central entity, the Banque Centrale Populaire. The group also comprises eight regional entities known as Banques Populaires Régionales: Centre-Sud (covering the Souss-Massa region), Fez-Meknes, Laayoune, Marrakesh-Beni Mellal, Nador-Al Hoceima, Oujda, Rabat-Kenitra, and Tangier-Tétouan.

As of 2024, BCP Group is Morocco's second-largest banking group, behind market leader Attijariwafa Bank and ahead of Bank of Africa. The group operates in several countries in sub-Saharan Africa. Banque Centrale Populaire is listed on the Casablanca Stock Exchange.

== Overview ==
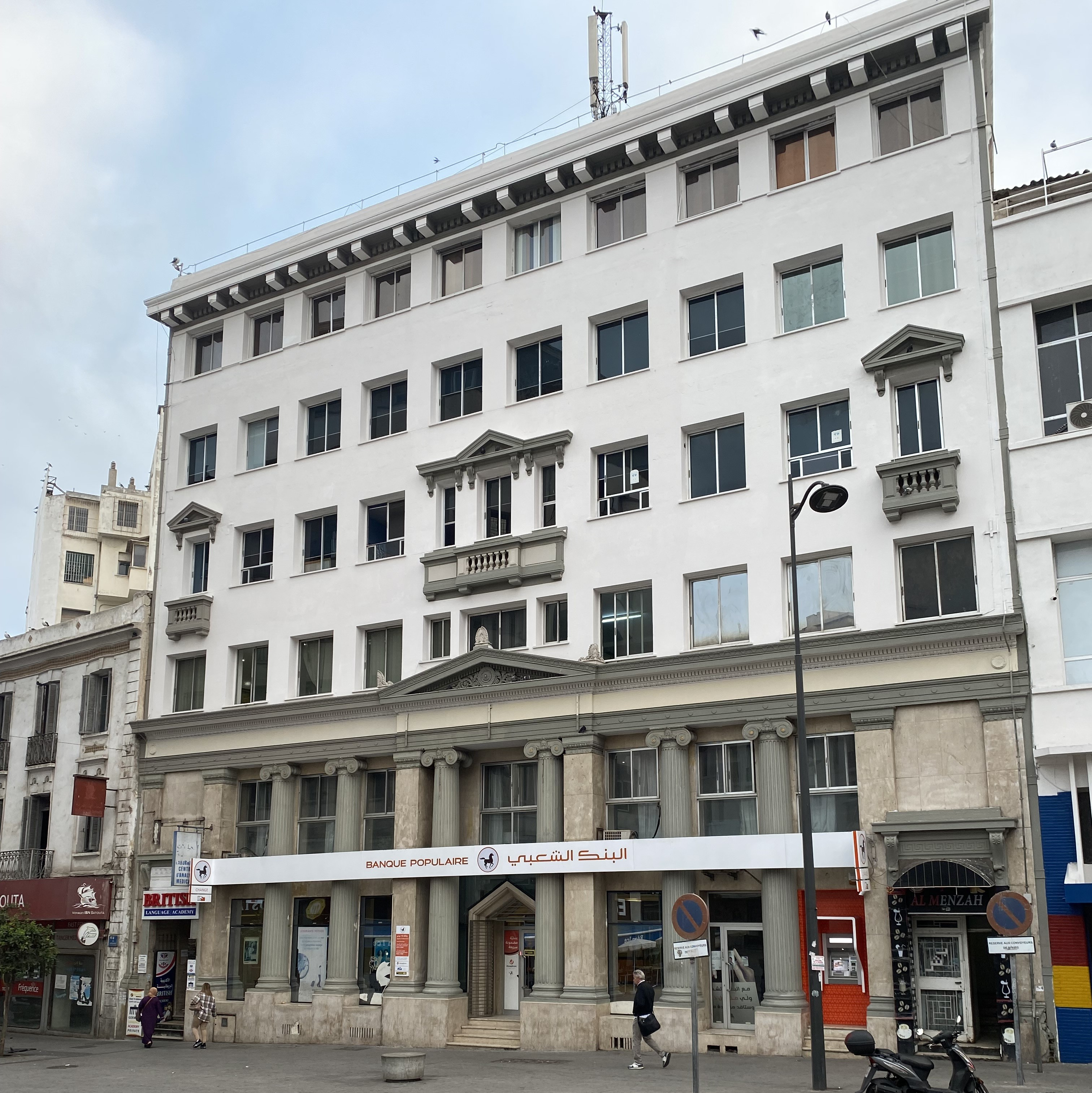
A Banque Populaire branch in downtown Casablanca, in the former building of the Bank of British West Africa

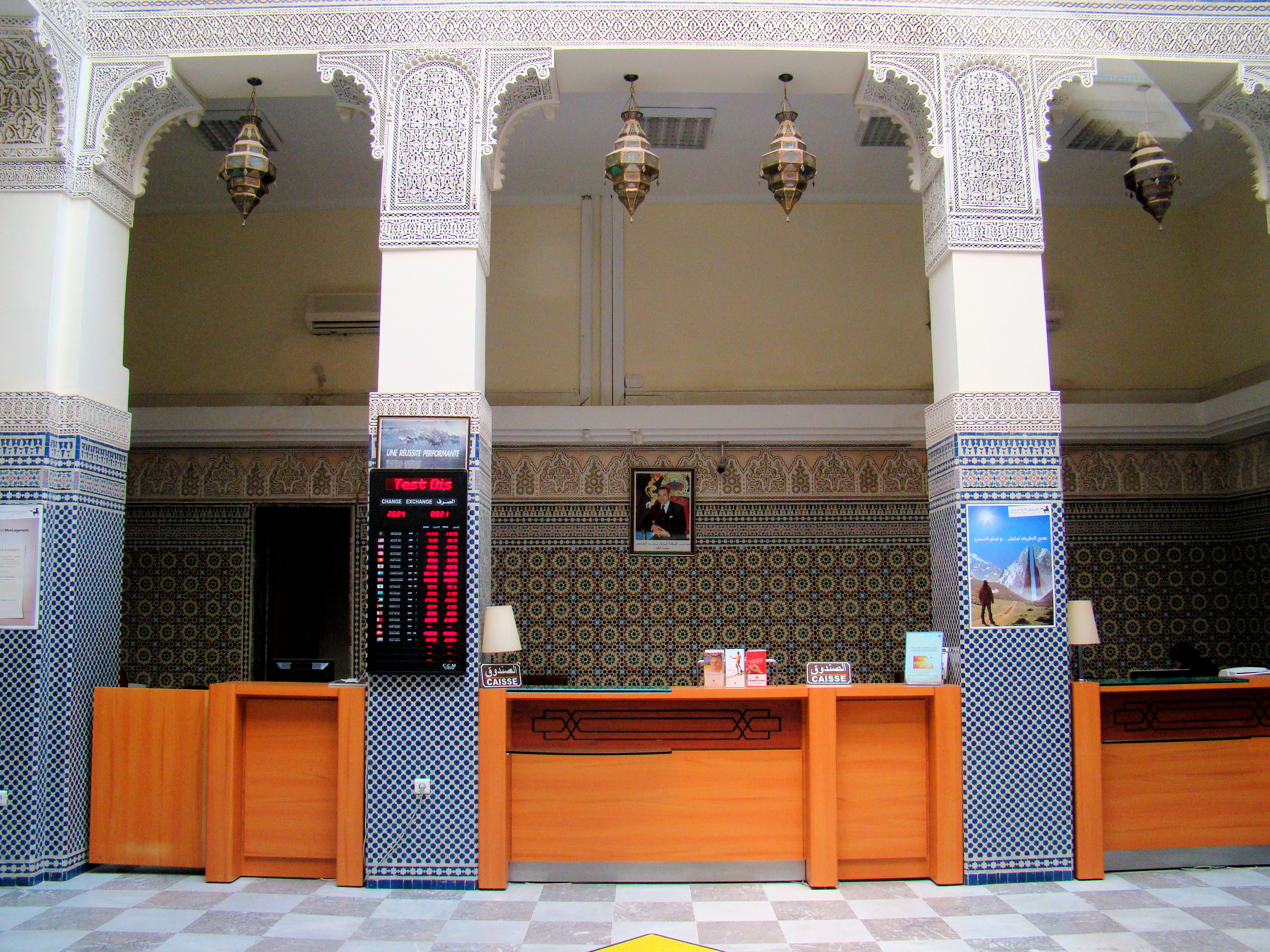
Branch in the Old Town of Fez

The origins of BCP Group go back to a Royal Decree, or dahir, issued in the name of the Moroccan sultan Mulay Yusef by the authorities of the French protectorate in Morocco on 25 May 1926. The decree authorized the creation of cooperative banks in the territory and was inspired by the French legislation of 1917 that organized the system later known as Groupe Banque Populaire in France. Several local cooperative banks were established between 1931 and 1952, although they later faced significant management difficulties. On 2 February 1961, after Moroccan independence, a new decree reorganized the network and created BCP as its central institution, with the status of a government agency. The group's deposit base grew rapidly during the following decade, and by 1974 it had become Morocco's largest bank by deposit volume.

In 1972, BCP created its European subsidiary in Paris, operating under the Chaabi Bank brand. Its expansion into Africa began in 1990, following government agreements between Morocco and the Central African Republic (CAR) and Guinea. The Banque Populaire Maroco-Centrafricaine (BPMC) was established in Bangui in July 1990 after a diplomatic protocol dated 13 February 1989, while a similar institution, BPMG, was created in Conakry.

BCP was reorganized as a joint-stock company in 2000. In 2004, it was partly privatized through a listing on the Casablanca Stock Exchange. The group later absorbed the regional bank based in Casablanca in 2010, and the regional bank based in El Jadida in 2016. In May 2012, the Paris-based Groupe BPCE acquired a 5% minority stake in BCP.

Also in 2012, BCP Group expanded further into sub-Saharan Africa through the acquisition of Atlantic Bank Group, which operated in Côte d'Ivoire, Benin, Burkina Faso, Mali, Niger, Senegal and Togo.

By that period, the bank held a 27.9% share of customer deposits in Morocco. This corresponded to customer deposits of 204.9 billion dirhams in the first half of 2013. At the end of 2012, the bank had 11,878 employees.

By 2014, the Moroccan state had sold its remaining ownership stake in BCP to the group's regional banks. A 2015 restructuring increased BCP's equity ownership in the regional banks to majority stakes of 52%, with the remainder held by cooperative clients. This change made BCP more similar in structure to a commercial banking group than to a traditional cooperative banking network. The regional banks, in turn, collectively hold a majority of BCP's shares.

In 2015, BCP Group acquired the former Niger operations of Banque Internationale pour l'Afrique Occidentale (BIAO). In 2016, it established a branch in Guinea-Bissau. It later acquired additional banking operations in Cameroon through Banque internationale du Cameroun pour l'épargne et le crédit (BICEC), in the Republic of the Congo through Banque commerciale internationale (BCI), in Madagascar through Banque Malgache de l'Océan Indien (BMOI), and in Mauritius.

In March 2023, BCP entered into a long-term partnership with Mastercard to develop digital payment services and related solutions.

BCP Group was ranked 22nd on Forbes Middle East's 30 Most Valuable Banks 2025 list. It was also ranked 39th on Forbes Middle East's Top 100 Listed Companies 2025 list.

== Operations ==
As of end-2022, BCP owned between 51% and 52.5% of equity in each of the eight regional banks. Its other subsidiaries included Banque Atlantique in Benin (58.6%), Burkina Faso (48.8%), Côte d'Ivoire (79.4%), Mali (57.5%), Niger (63.9%), Senegal (79.8%), and Togo (67.9%); BICEC in Cameroon (78.4%), BPMC in the CAR (75%), BCI in the Republic of the Congo (100%), Chaabi Bank in France (100%), BPMG in Guinea (61.7%), BMOI in Madagascar (66.7%), and BCP Mauritius (100%).

For 2023, net banking income grew by 10.6% to MAD 22.9 billion. Consolidated deposits totalled MAD 372 billion and consolidated loans stood at MAD 319.4 billion.

== See also ==
- List of banks in Morocco
