= Maârif =

Maârif المعاريف ⵍⵎⵄⴰⵔⵉⴼ
- Arrondissement of Casablanca
- Casablanca Twin Center from boulevard Al Massira Al Khadra.
- Interactive map of Maârif المعاريف ⵍⵎⵄⴰⵔⵉⴼ
- Coordinates: 33°34′12″N 7°38′09″W
- Country: Morocco
- Region: Casablanca-Settat
- Préfecture: Casablanca

Population (2024)
  - Total: 139,669
- Time zone: UTC+0 (GMT)
- Geocode: 06.141.01.03

Maârif or El Maârif (Arabic: المعاريف, lit. 'the notables') is one of the 16 borough of Casablanca, the largest city in Morocco.

As of 2024, it had 139,669 inhabitants.

It is bounded to the north by Boulevard d'Anfa and Mohamed Zerktouni, to the east by Avenue 2 Mars and Nador, to the south by the Casablanca urban highway, and to the west by Boulevard Ghandi and Route d'El Jadida.

Since the 2021 local elections, the President of the borough is Abdessadek Morchid (عبد الصادق مرشد).

== Borough ==
=== Management ===
The members of the borough council are required to meet 3 times a year, during the first week of January, the first week of June, and the first week of September.

The meeting are generally open to the public

=== Elected members ===
Since the 2021 local elections, the current President of this borough is Abdessadek Morchid (عبد الصادق مرشد).

== History ==
In 1949, the musician Salim Halali settled in Morocco and transformed an old café in Maârif into a prestigious cabaret, Le Coq d'Or, where Warda Al-Jazairia and El-Haja El-Hamdaouia performed. In the neighborhood is also located the Mohammed V stadium which holds room for 44'000 spectators.

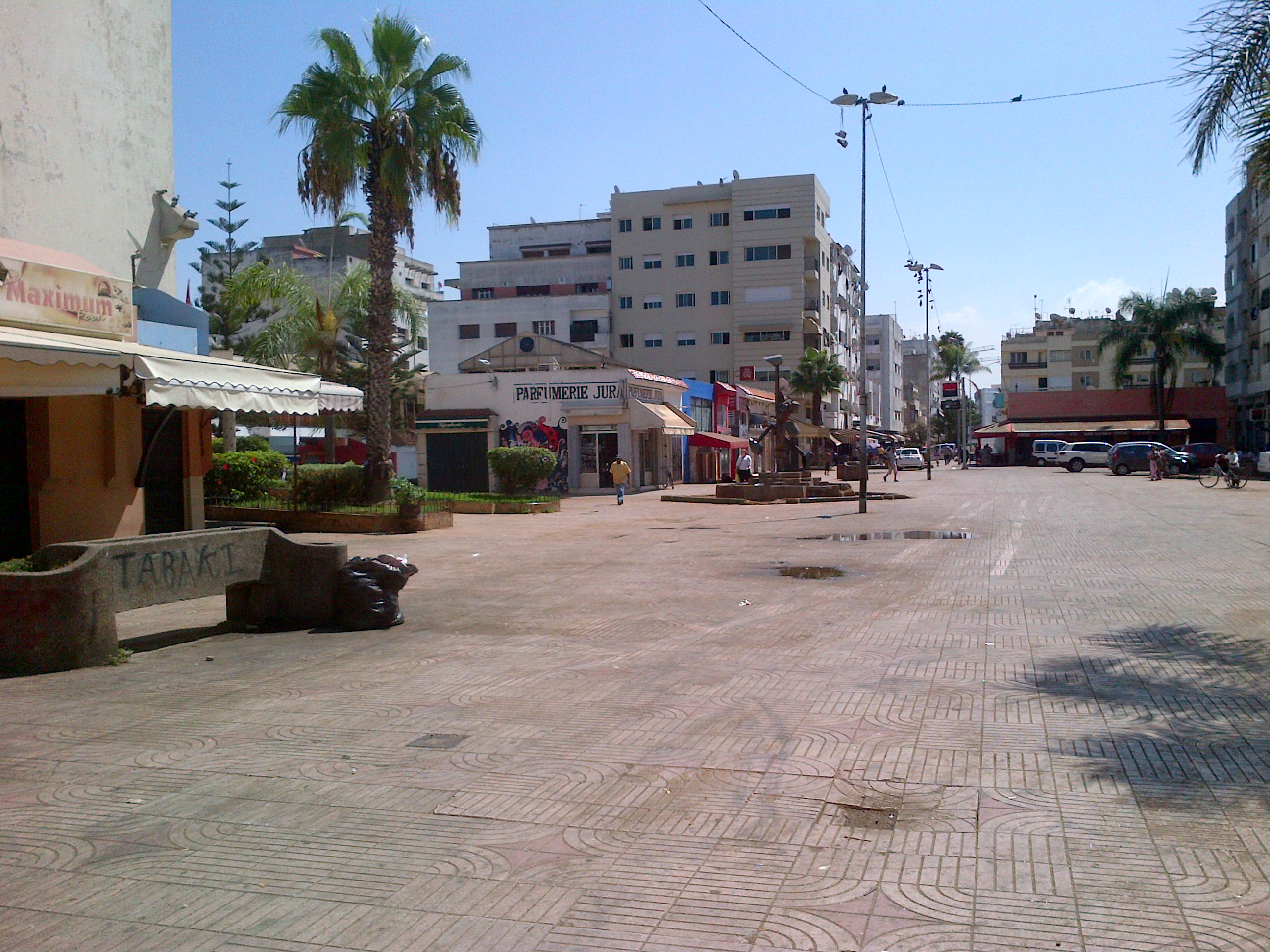
Rue du Jura in 2013, before renovations.

The novelist Mohamed Zafzaf also lived in the neighborhood.

== Demography ==
According to the 2024 General Census of Population and Housing by the High Commission for Planning, Maârif has 139,669 inhabitants.
