= Global Framework Agreement =

Non-binding accord between unions and multi-national corporations

A Global Framework Agreement or GFA, previously called International Framework Agreement or IFA is a non-binding agreement between global union federations and multinational companies, which at minimum promises that workers within a company's world-wide operations can exercise fundamental labour rights in accordance with ILO core labour standards on freedom of association and collective bargaining. The first GFA was signed in 1988 between the International Union of Foodworkers (IUF) and French-multinational Danone. As of September 2018, more than 300 agreements between trade unions and multinational companies have been signed.

== See also ==
- OECD Guidelines for Multinational Enterprises
