= Casablanca Twin Center =

Complex of two skyscrapers in Casablanca, Morocco

- برجا الدار البيضاء

General information
- Location: Casablanca, Morocco
- Coordinates: 33°35′10″N 7°37′55″W
- Completed: 1999

Height
- Roof: 115 m (377 ft)

Technical details
- Floor count: 28
- Floor area: 93,000 m^{2} (1,000,000 ft^{2})

Design and construction
- Architect: Ricardo Bofill Taller de Arquitectura

The Casablanca Twin Center (Arabic: برجا الدار البيضاء) is a complex of two skyscrapers located at Casablanca, Morocco. The two structures, the West Tower and the East Tower, have 28 floors each. The center houses a complex of shops, offices, and a five-star hotel, and lies at the heart of Casablanca in the Maarif district, at the crossroads between Zerktouni Boulevard and the Boulevard Al Massira Al Khadra. The main architect was Ricardo Bofill and the associate architect was the Moroccan Elie Mouyal.

== Location and appearance ==
The complex forms the main gateway to the residential districts in the west of the city, and is located on a triangular site which emphasizes the project's asymmetry. The two connecting towers are identical, but distinct, and are joined at the lower levels by a large complex containing the bulk of the popular shopping center. The whole structure presents a modern high-tech image, with a pared-down design and minimal relief, while local tradition is maintained in the building materials: marble, plaster, and ceramic tiles.

The central square is a landscaped shopping center on three terraces, offering a perspective on the urban scale, when seen from the exterior. The two towers are one of the tallest buildings in Casablanca. They rise through 115 meters (377 ft) to a total of 28 floors each. The total floor area is 93,000 m^{2} (1,001,044 sq ft), with a 7.2-meter-high (24 ft) atrium. There are 15 elevators (lifts) in the Twin Center. The towers were inaugurated in 1998 and became a landmark in Casablanca.

== Use of towers ==
Above the shopping center, which includes 5 levels, has a supermarket in addition to boutique and designer shops, are the two towers:

- The West Tower, or Tower A, forming part of the shopping center, with multiple floors of office accommodation above;
- The East Tower, or Tower B, which contains the five-star Kenzi Tower Hotel.

Offices in Tower A are much sought after by international businesses. The hotel in Tower B has 210 bedrooms, plus 27 suites, including the 'Casablanca Royal Suite'. Facilities such as spa, bars, and restaurants are open to non-residents and are popular amongst Casablanca's richer residents, particularly the panoramic restaurant on the 27 floor, and "Bar 28", located on the 28 and top floor of Tower B.

== See also ==
- Hassan II Mosque
- List of tallest buildings in Morocco
- List of tallest buildings in Africa
- List of skyscrapers
- List of the world's tallest structures
- List of works by Ricardo Bofill Taller de Arquitectura
