= Besix =

Belgian-French construction group

BESIX Group S.A.
- Type: NV
- Industry: Construction
- Founded: 1909; 117 years ago
- Headquarters: Brussels, Belgium
- Area served: Worldwide
- Key people: Pierre Sironval (CEO); Johan Beerlandt (Chairman)
- Services: Construction, Real Estate Development, Concessions & Assets
- Revenue: ▲US$3.8 billion (2020)
- Owner: Orascom Construction (50%), Belgian nationals (50%)
- Number of employees: 12,000 (2020)
- Website: besix.com

BESIX Group is a Belgian construction group based in Brussels, one of the world's leading international contractors according to the ENR ranking. Active since 1909, BESIX operates in Europe, the Middle East, Oceania, Africa, North America and Asia.

Its achievements include Dubai’s Burj Khalifa, the world's tallest tower, buildings of the European Parliament in Brussels, and the Grand Egyptian Museum on the Giza pyramids plateau. In 2021 and 2022, it was announced that BESIX had been chosen to build the Guggenheim Museum in Abu Dhabi, the Triangle Tower, Paris' third highest tower, and the Kangaroo Point Green Bridge in Brisbane, one of the world's longest span cable stay pedestrian bridges.

In 2020, BESIX had a turnover of 3.8 billion dollars and 12,000 employees worldwide.

== General information ==
- Activities: Besix operates in most sectors of construction, including building, marine works, environmental installations (drinking water, wastewater treatment, waste treatment), sports and leisure facilities, civil works and infrastructure. In addition to construction, Besix is active in real estate development, mainly in Western Europe, and manages concessions through public-private partnerships in Europe and in the Middle East.
- Subsidiaries: BESIX's subsidiaries include Six Construct in the Middle East, Besix Watpac in Australia, and Besix Infra, Cobelba, Jacques Delens, Vanhout, Wust, Lux TP, Franki Foundations, Socogetra and Besix Unitec in Europe. BESIX also owns A-Stay, a company in the hotel sector.
- Shareholding: Besix is owned 50% by Belgian nationals and 50% by the Egyptian company Orascom. The chairman of the board of directors is Johan Beerlandt and the CEO is since 2021 Pierre Sironval, both of Belgian nationality.
- Membership: BESIX Group has signed an International Framework Agreement on fair labour standards with the Building and Wood Workers' International (BWI) global union federation and with its European Works Council (EWC). The group is a member of the United Nations Global Compact programme, as well as of the Belgian Alliance for Climate Action.
- Sponsorship: Since 2017 but ending in 2023, BESIX was an official sponsor of the Belgian football team, the Red Devils, the Belgium women's national football team and the national youth teams.

== Major projects | Examples ==
Sheikh Zayed Grand Mosque, Abu Dhabi

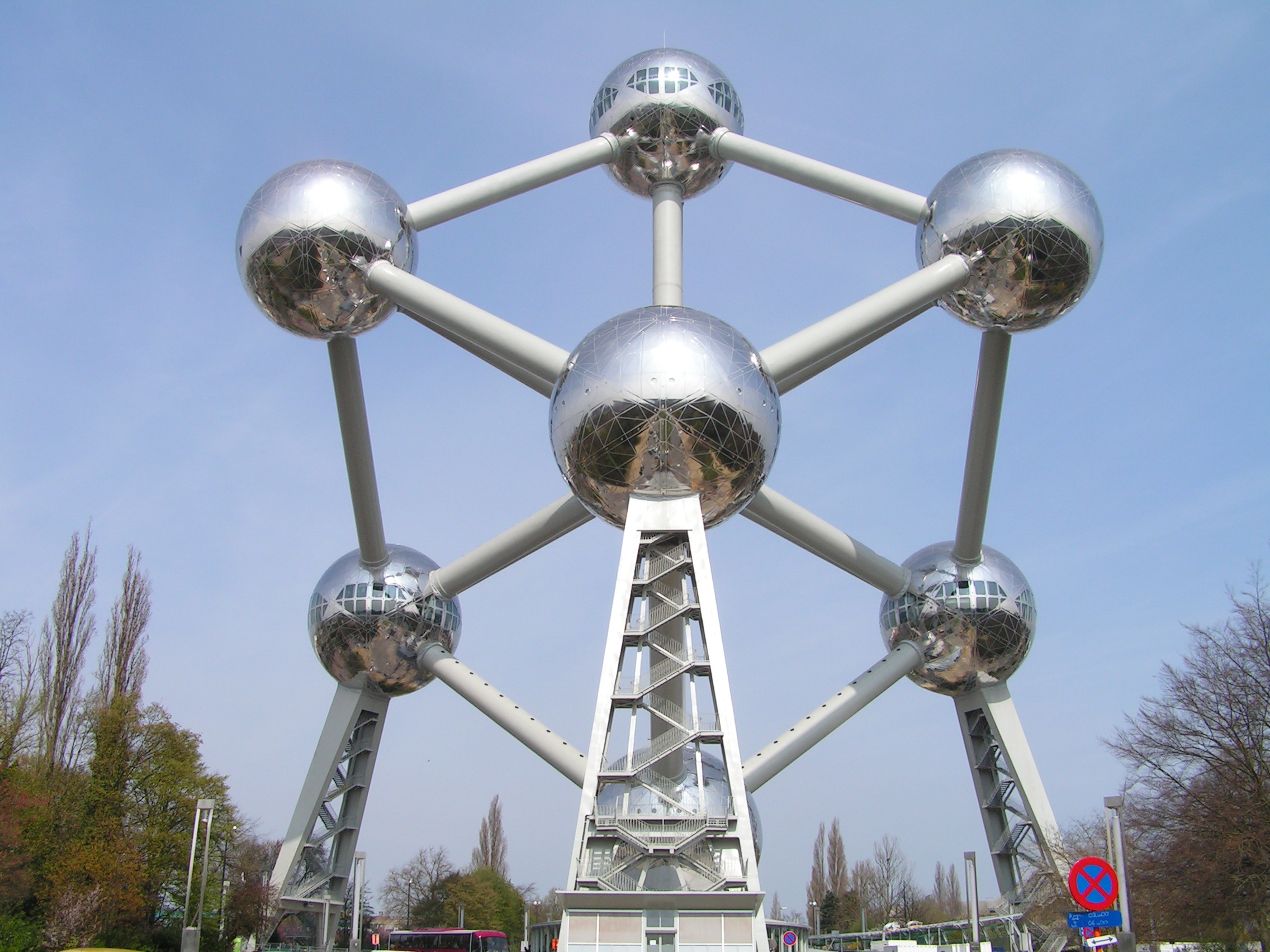
Atomium (Renovation), Belgium

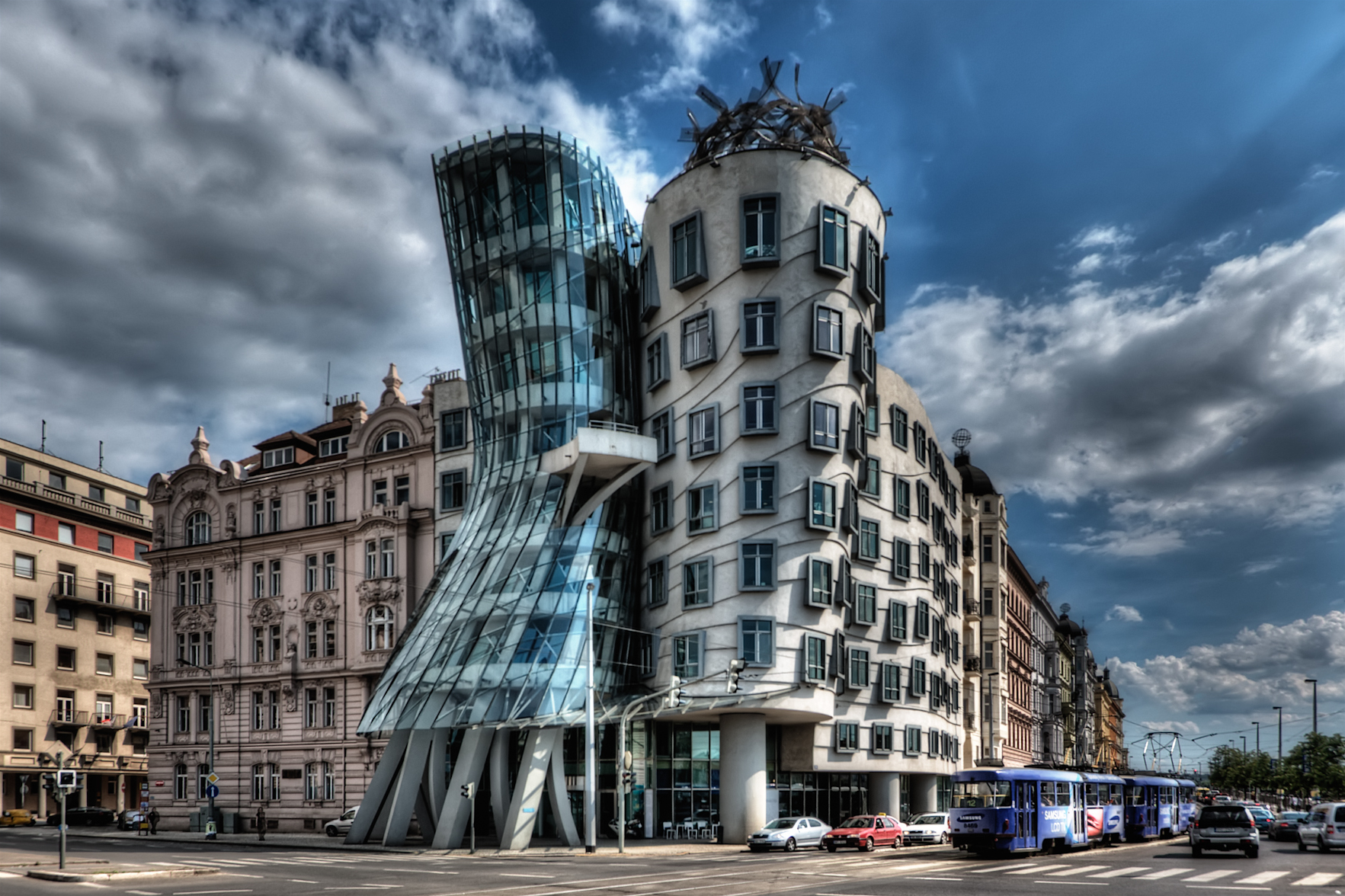
Dancing House, Czech Republic

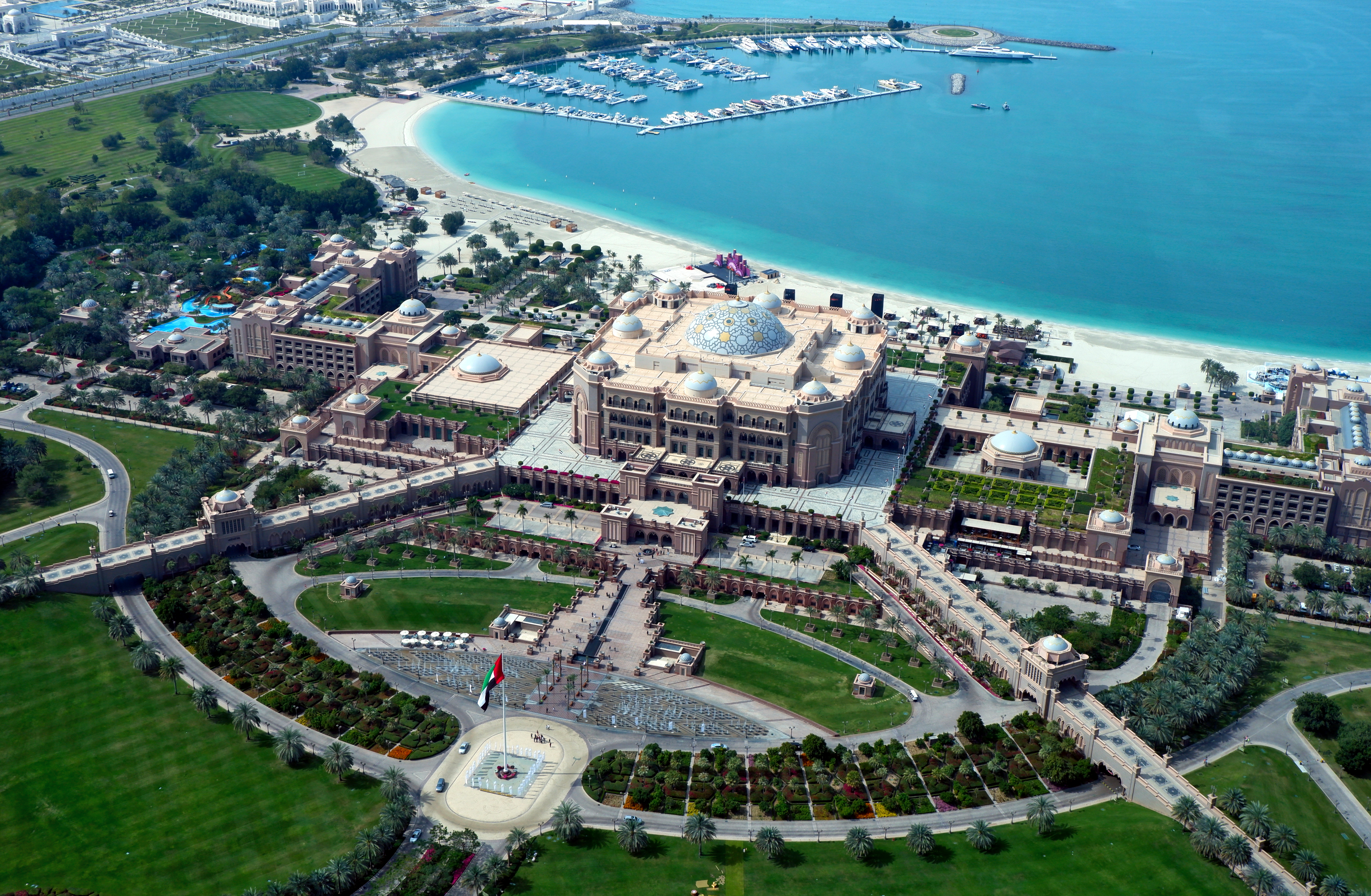
Emirates Palace, Abu Dhabi

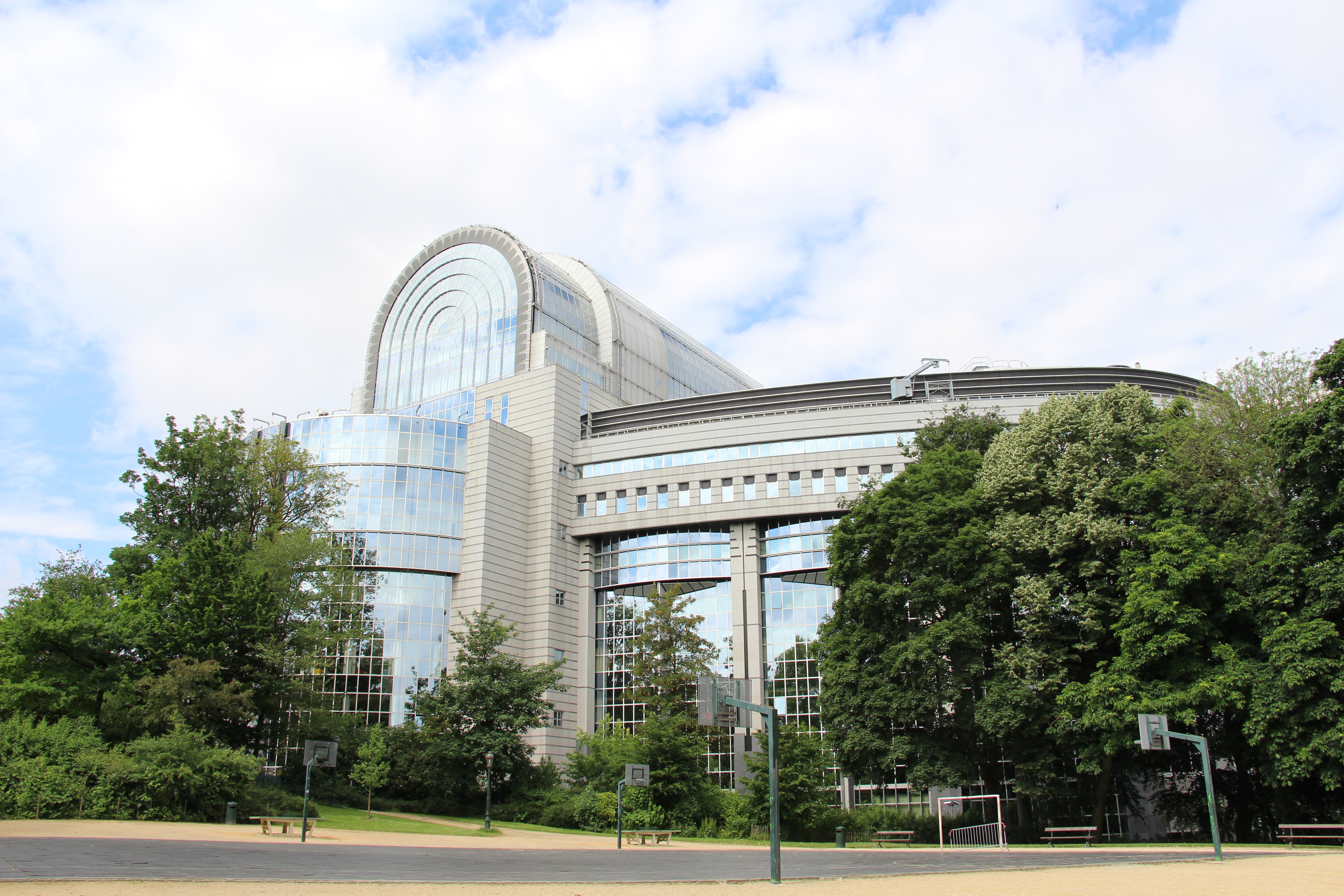
European Parliament, Brussels

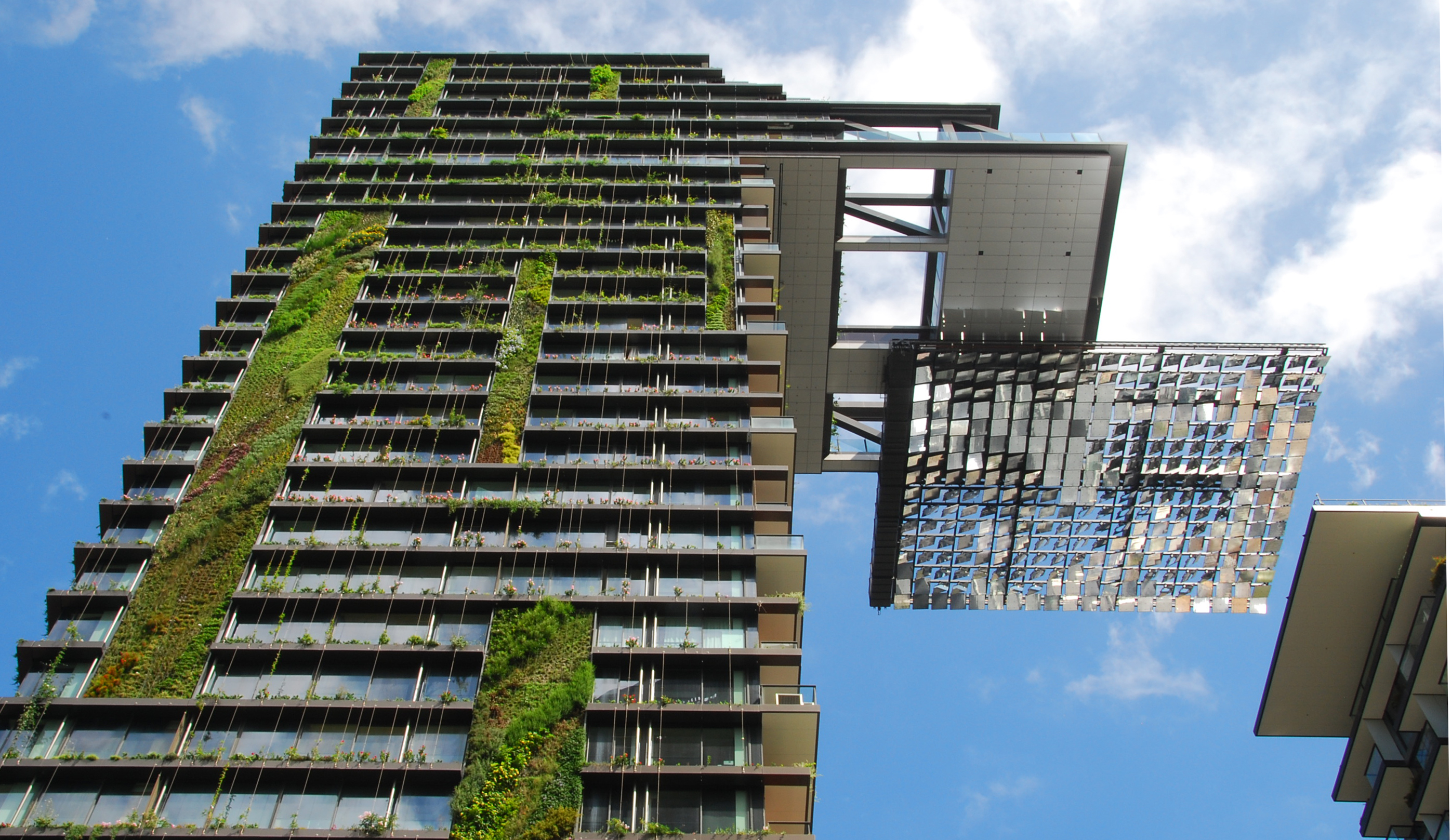
One Central Park, Australia

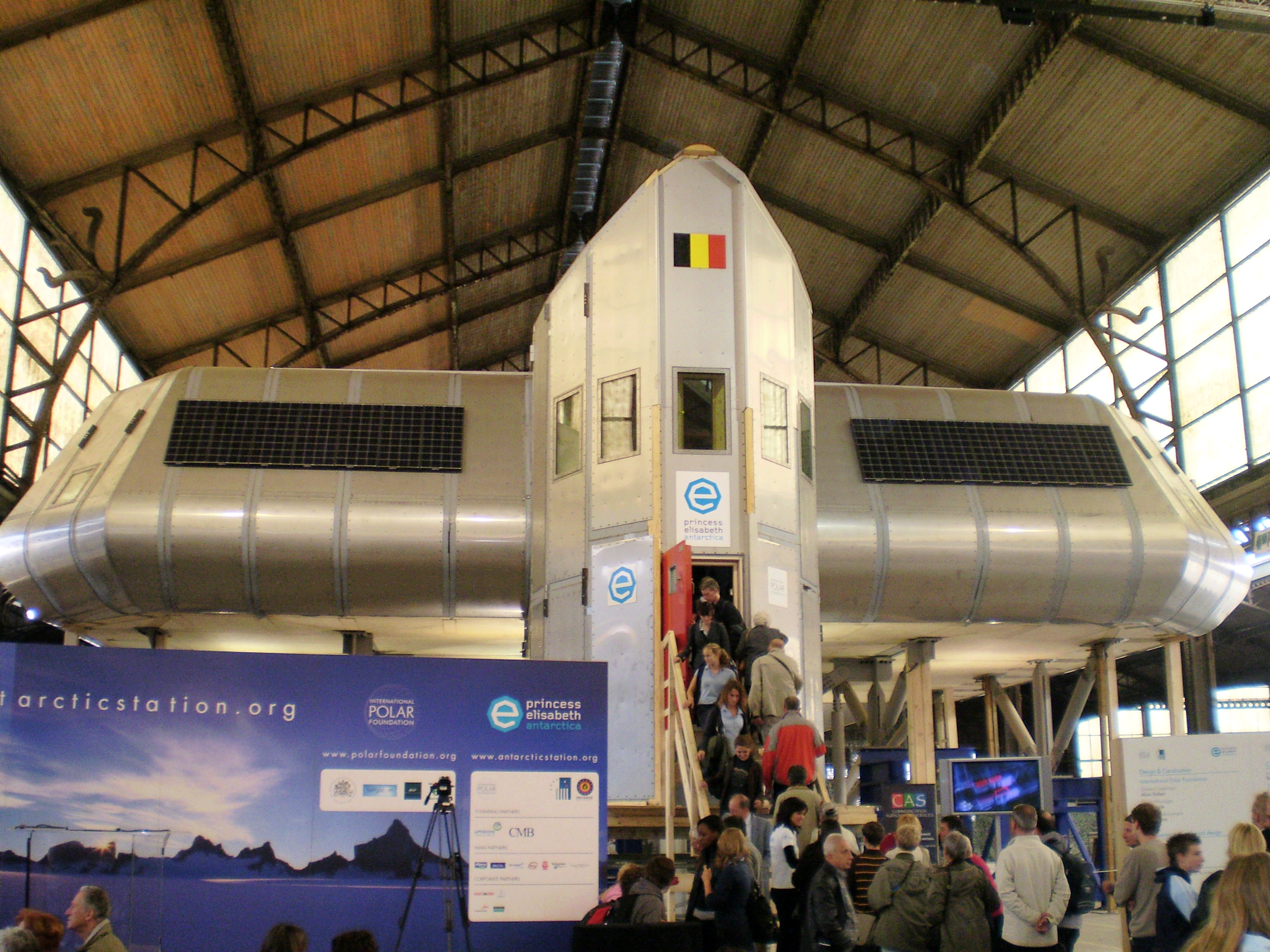
Princess Elisabeth Antarctica, Antarctica

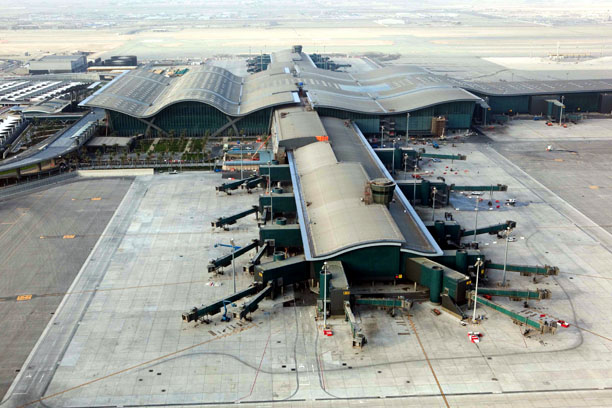
Hamad International Airport, Doha

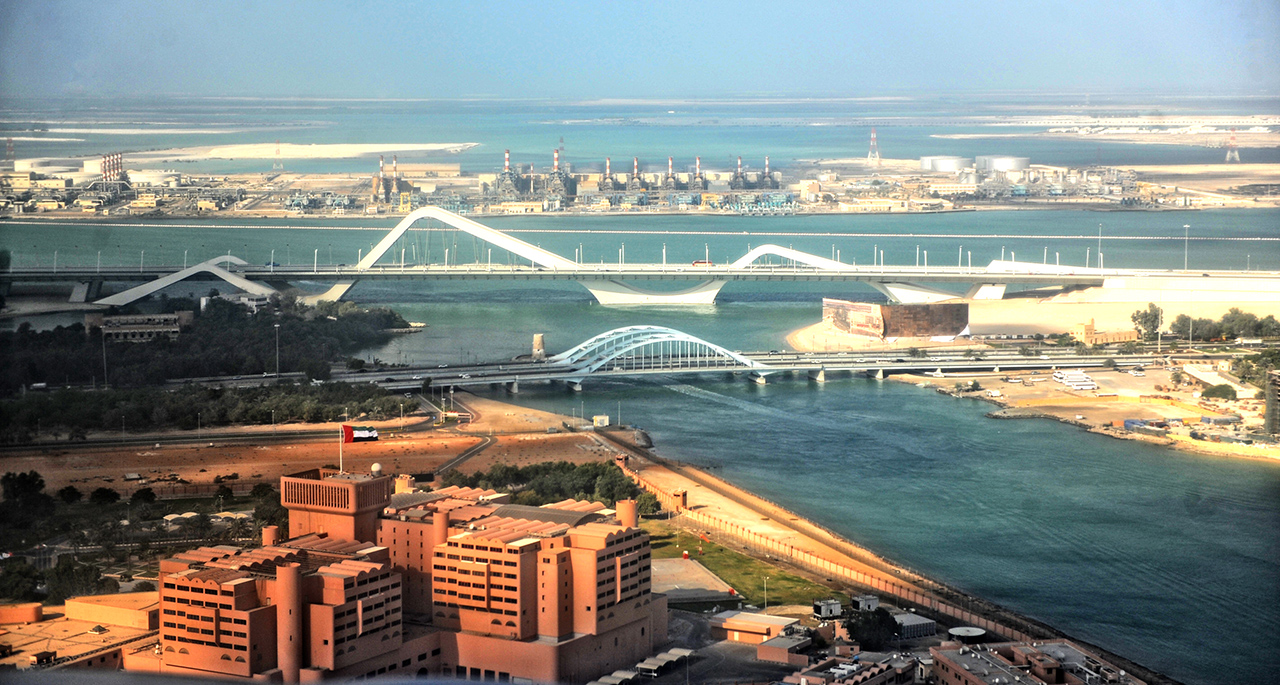
Sheikh Zayed Bridge, Abu Dhabi

Burj Khalifa, Dubai

The Address Downtown, Dubai

Aspire Tower, Qatar

Mohammed VI Tower, Morocco

ADNOC Headquarters, Abu Dhabi

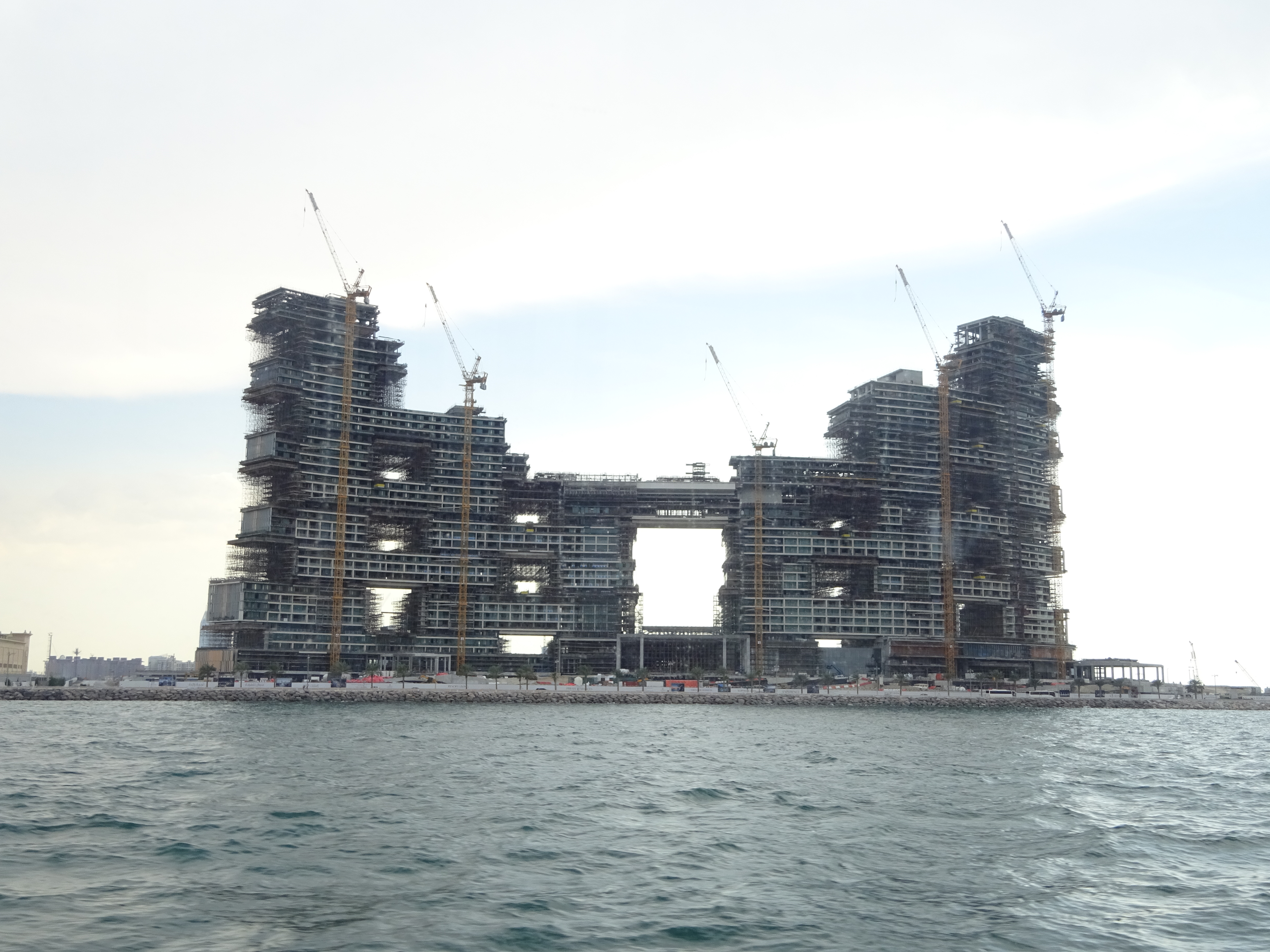
Atlantis The Royal, Dubai

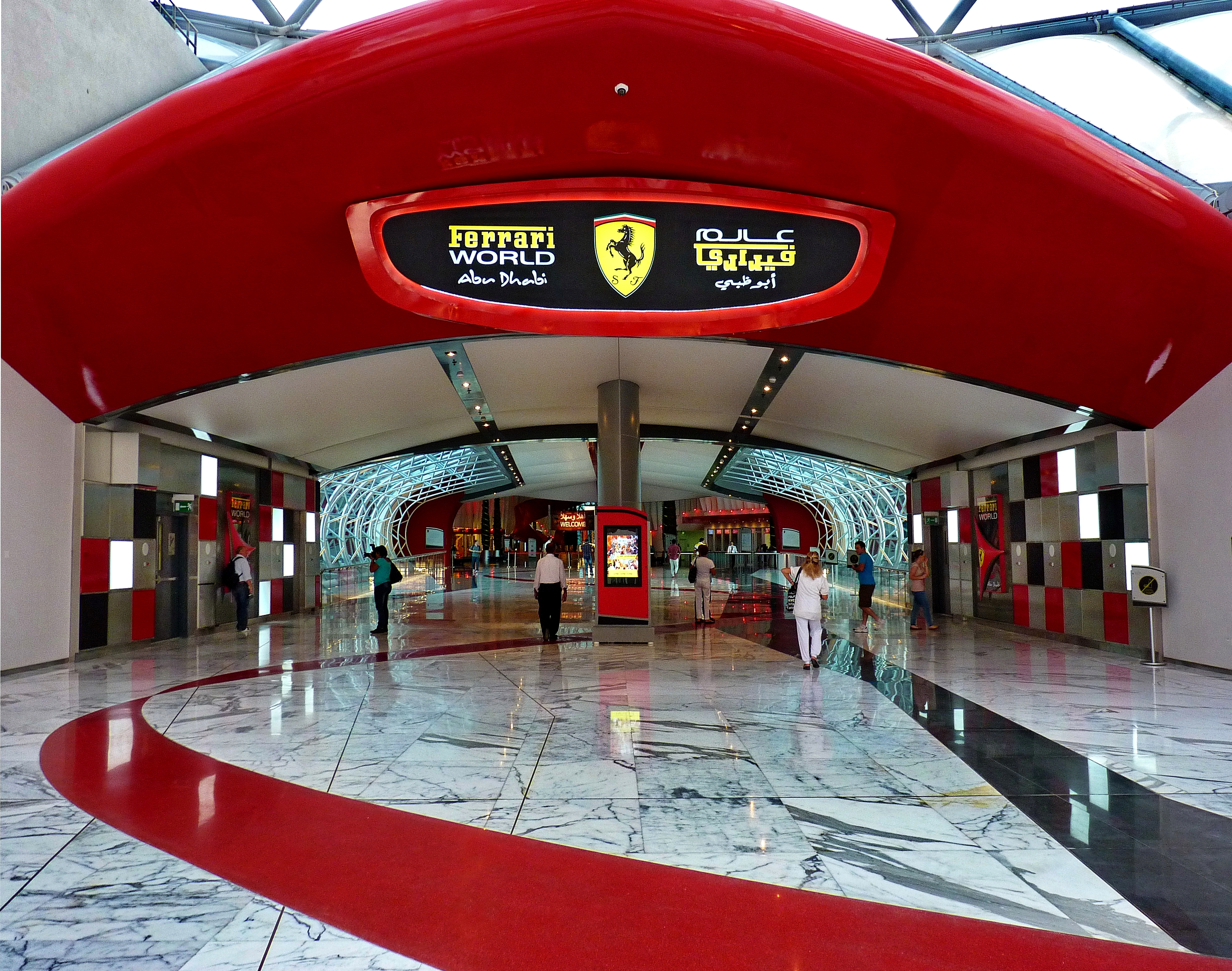
Ferrari World, Abu Dhabi

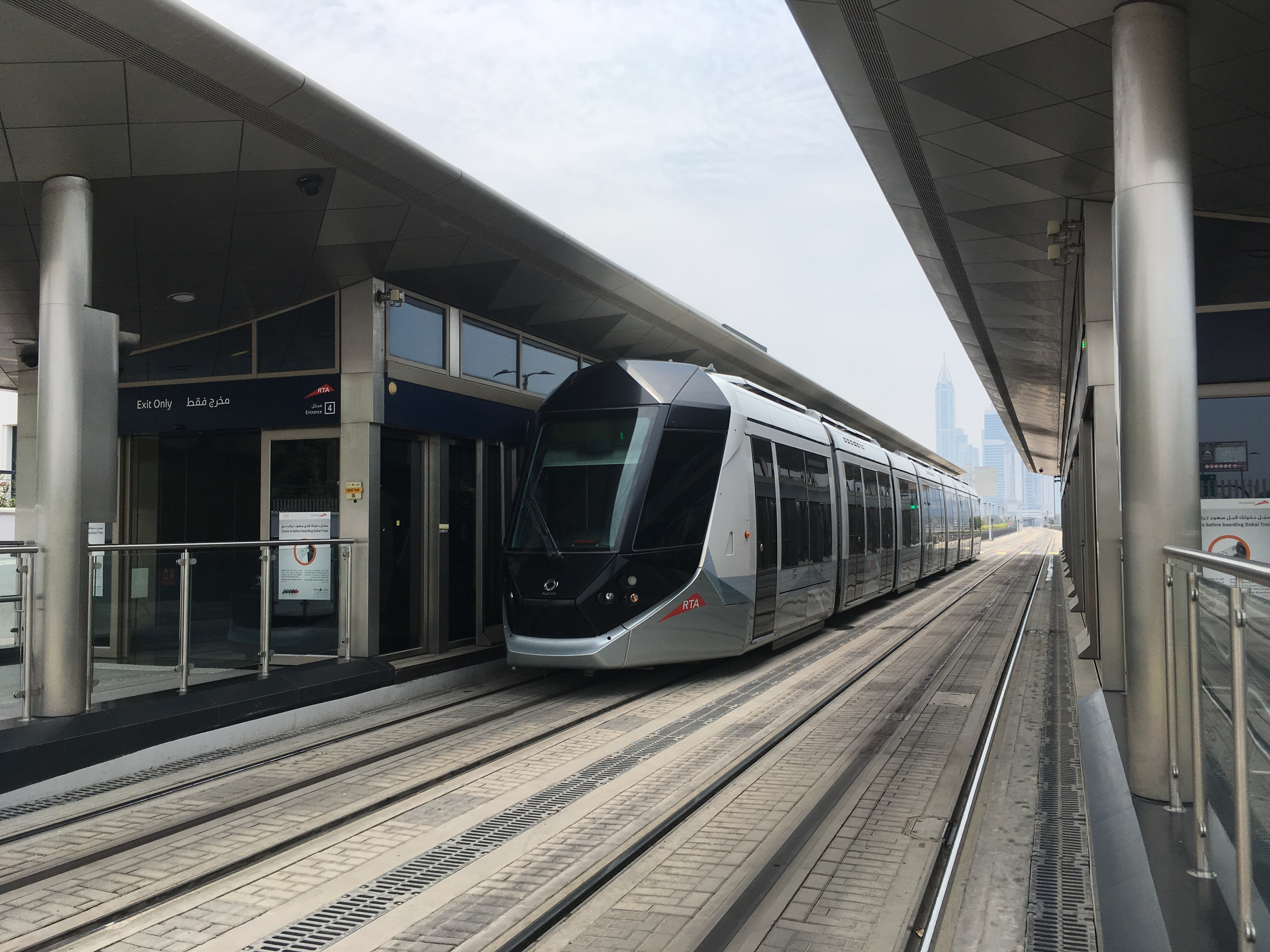
Dubai Tram, Dubai

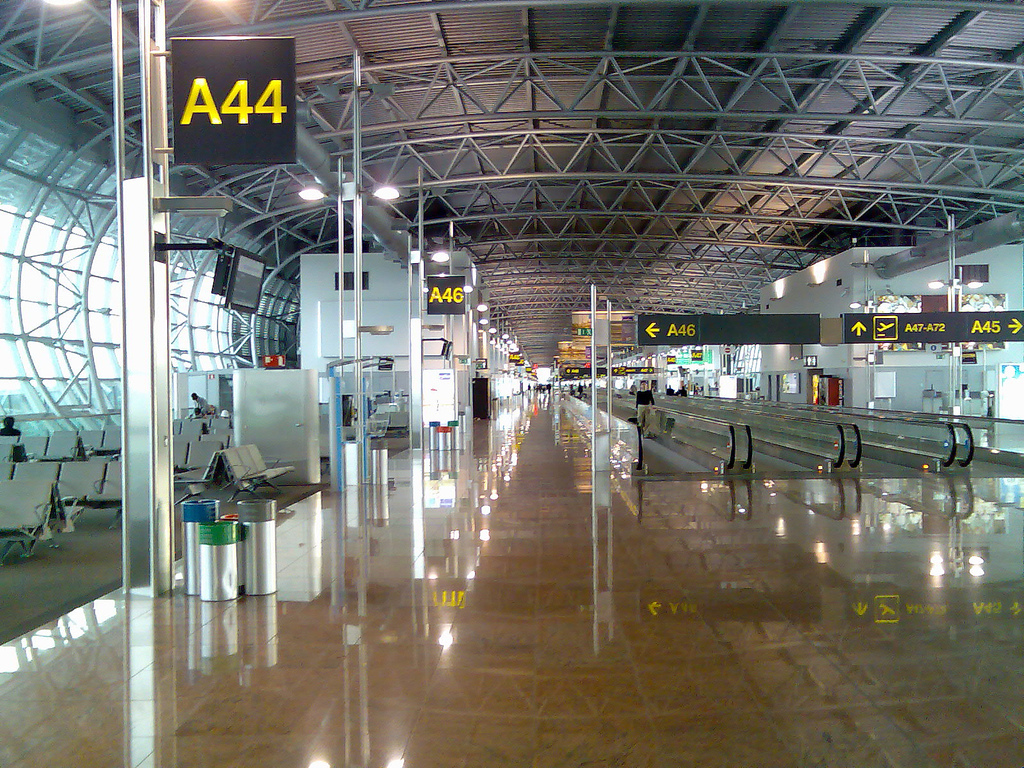
Brussels Airport, Belgium

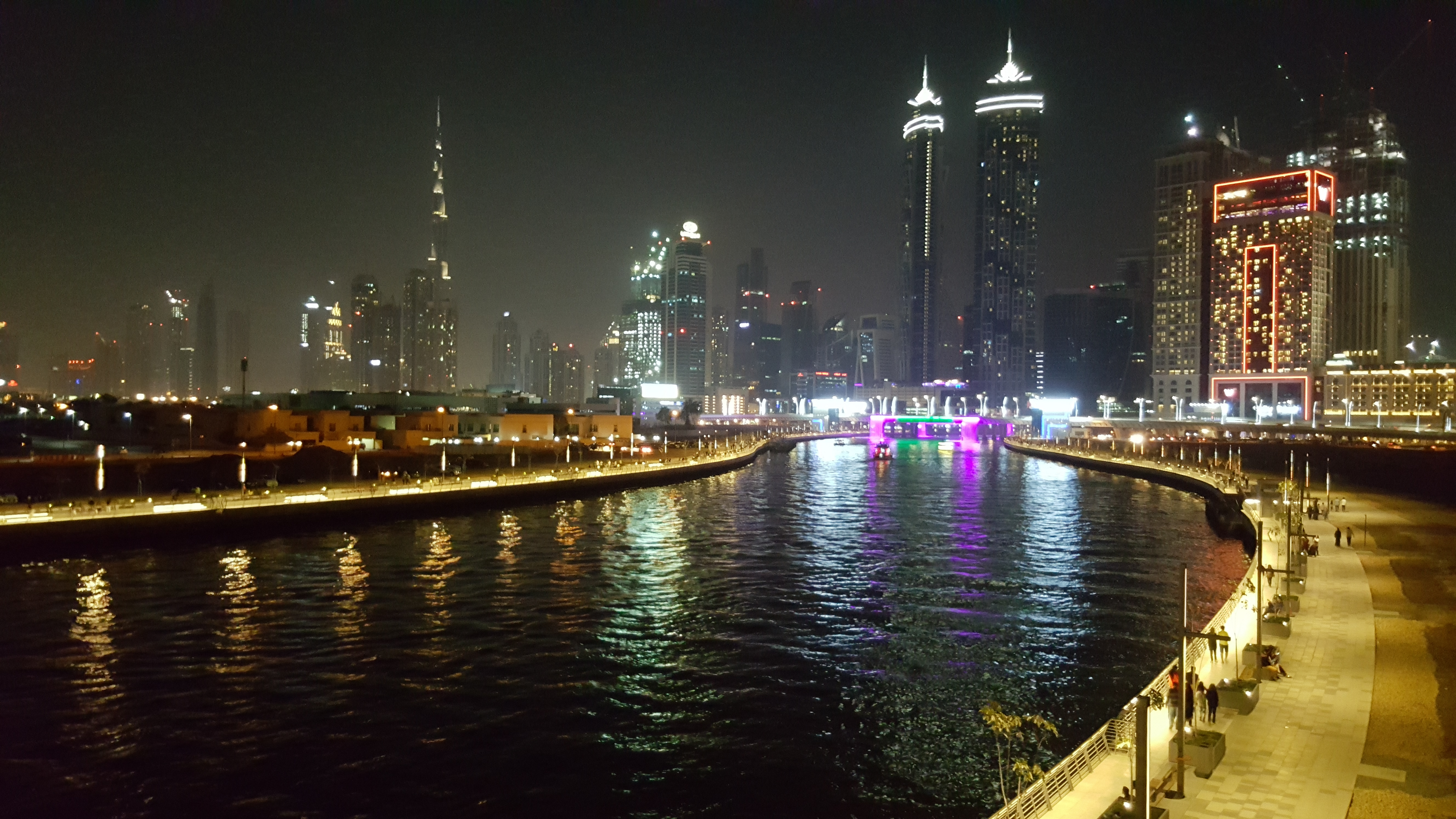
Dubai Canal, Dubai

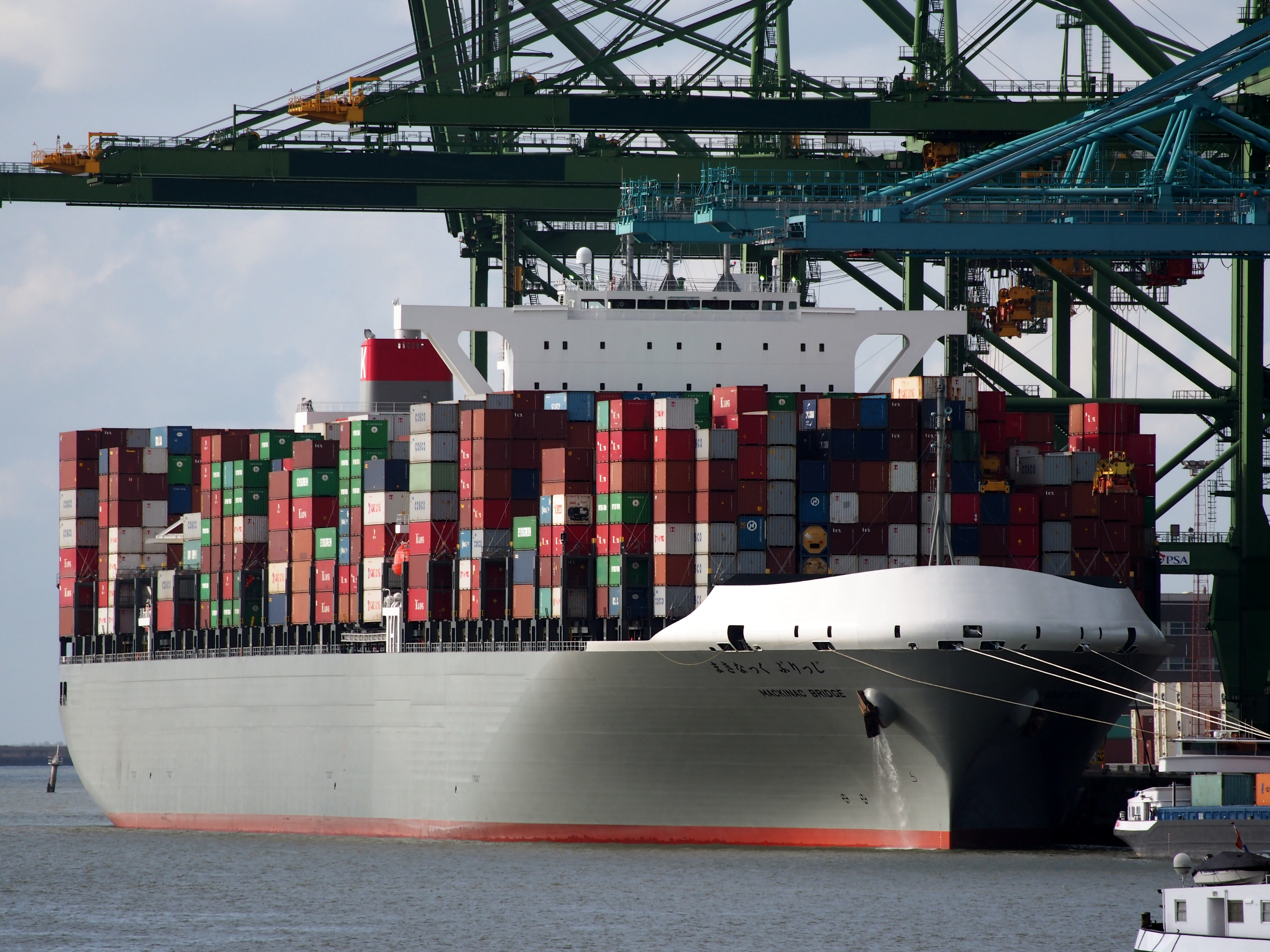
Port of Antwerp, Belgium

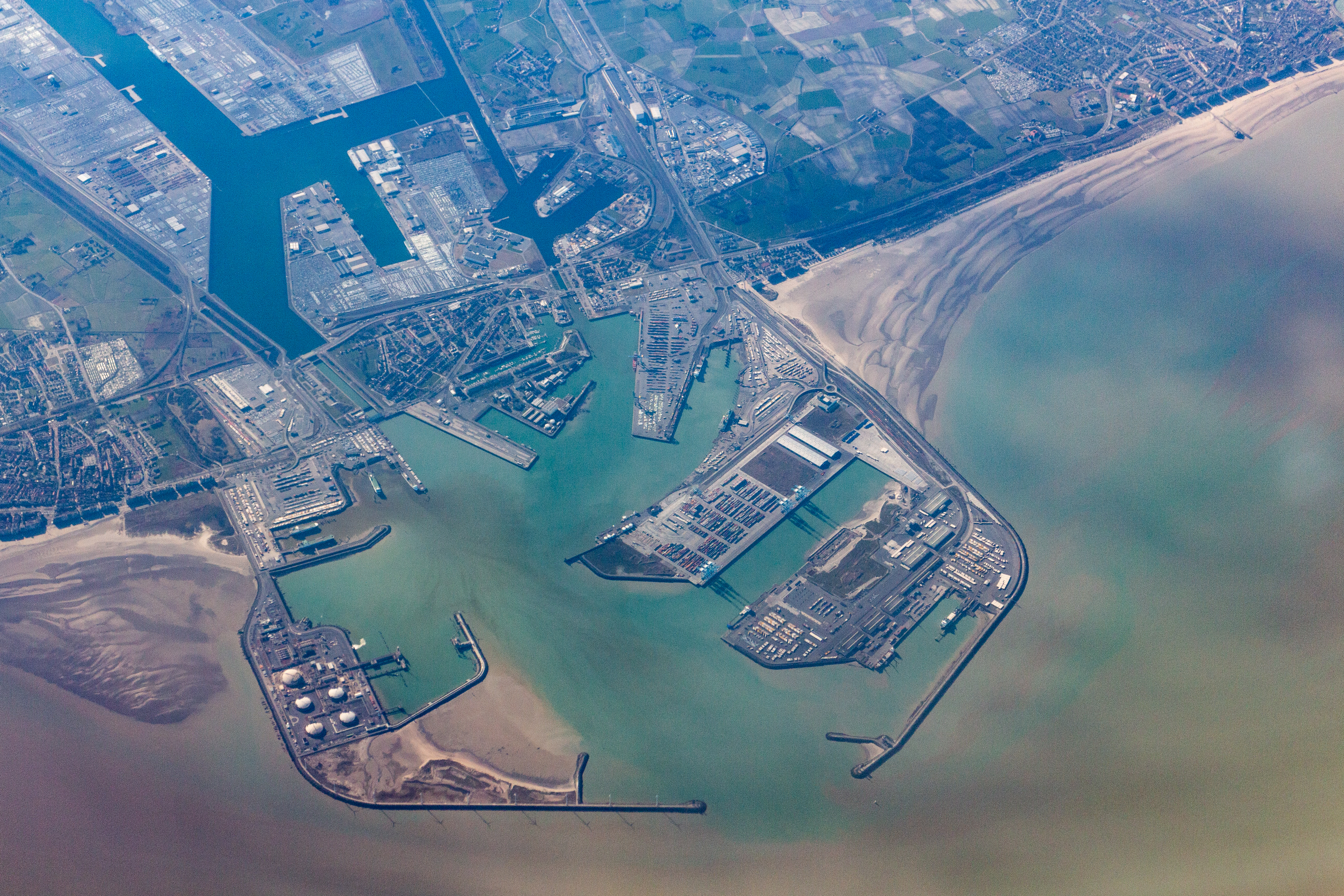
Port of Zeebrugge, Belgium

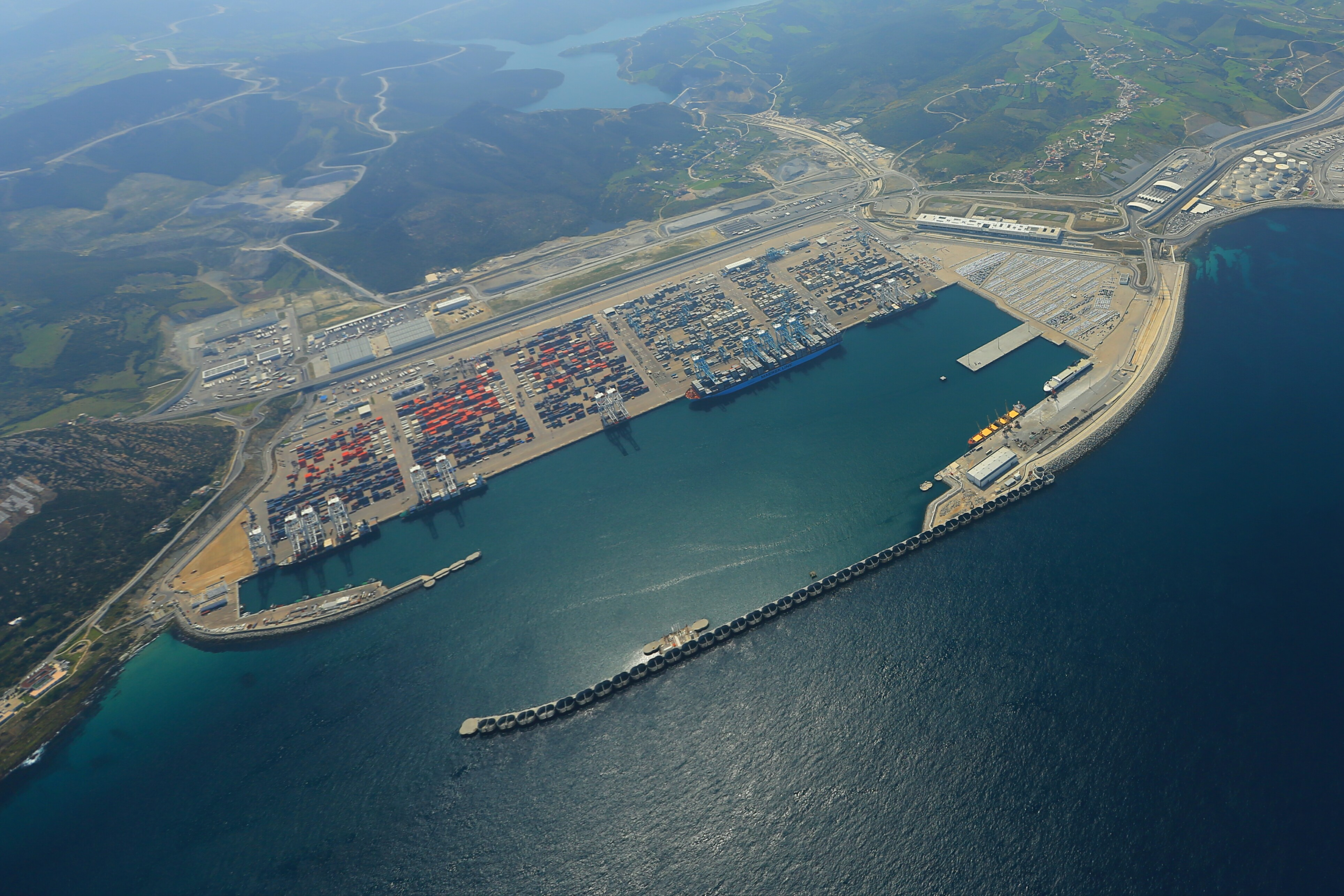
Tanger Med I & II, Morocco

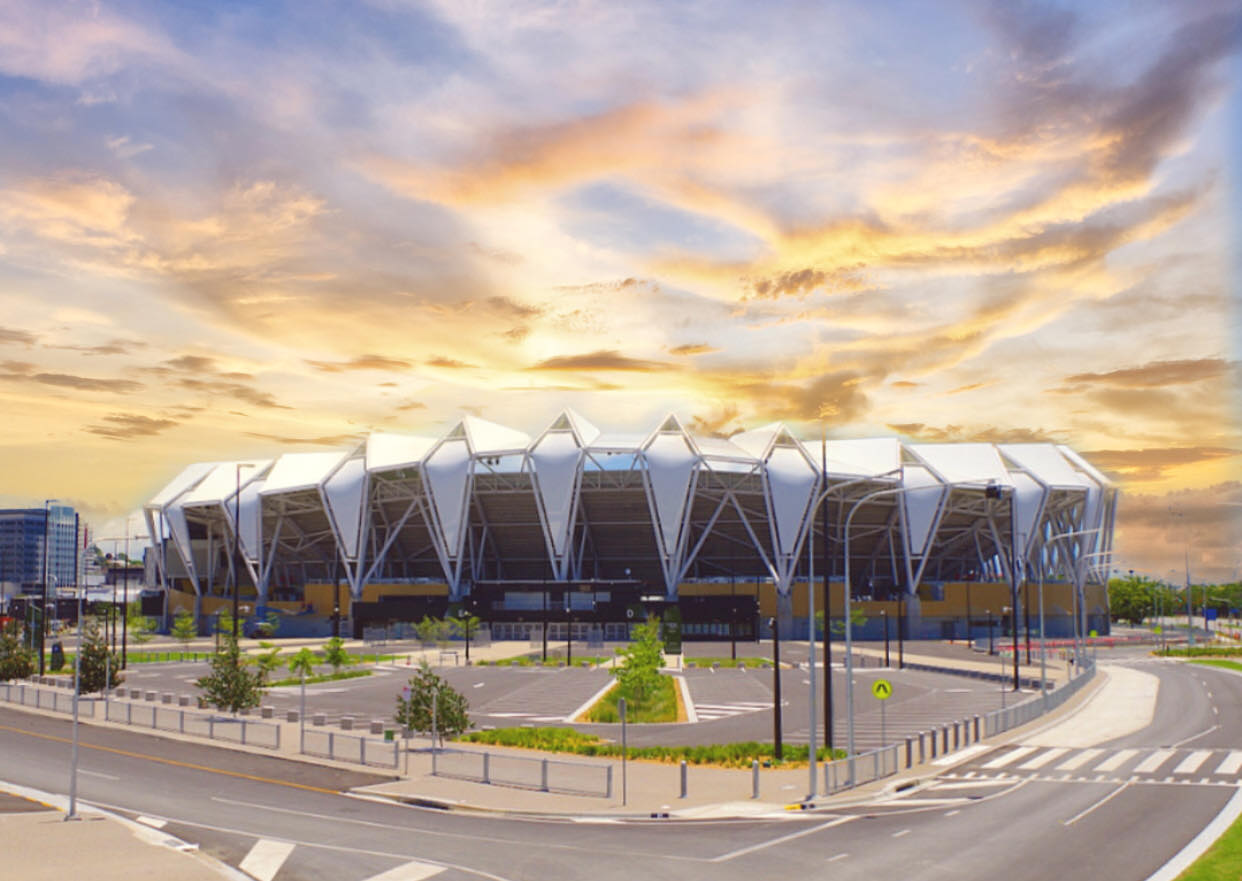
North Queensland Stadium, Australia

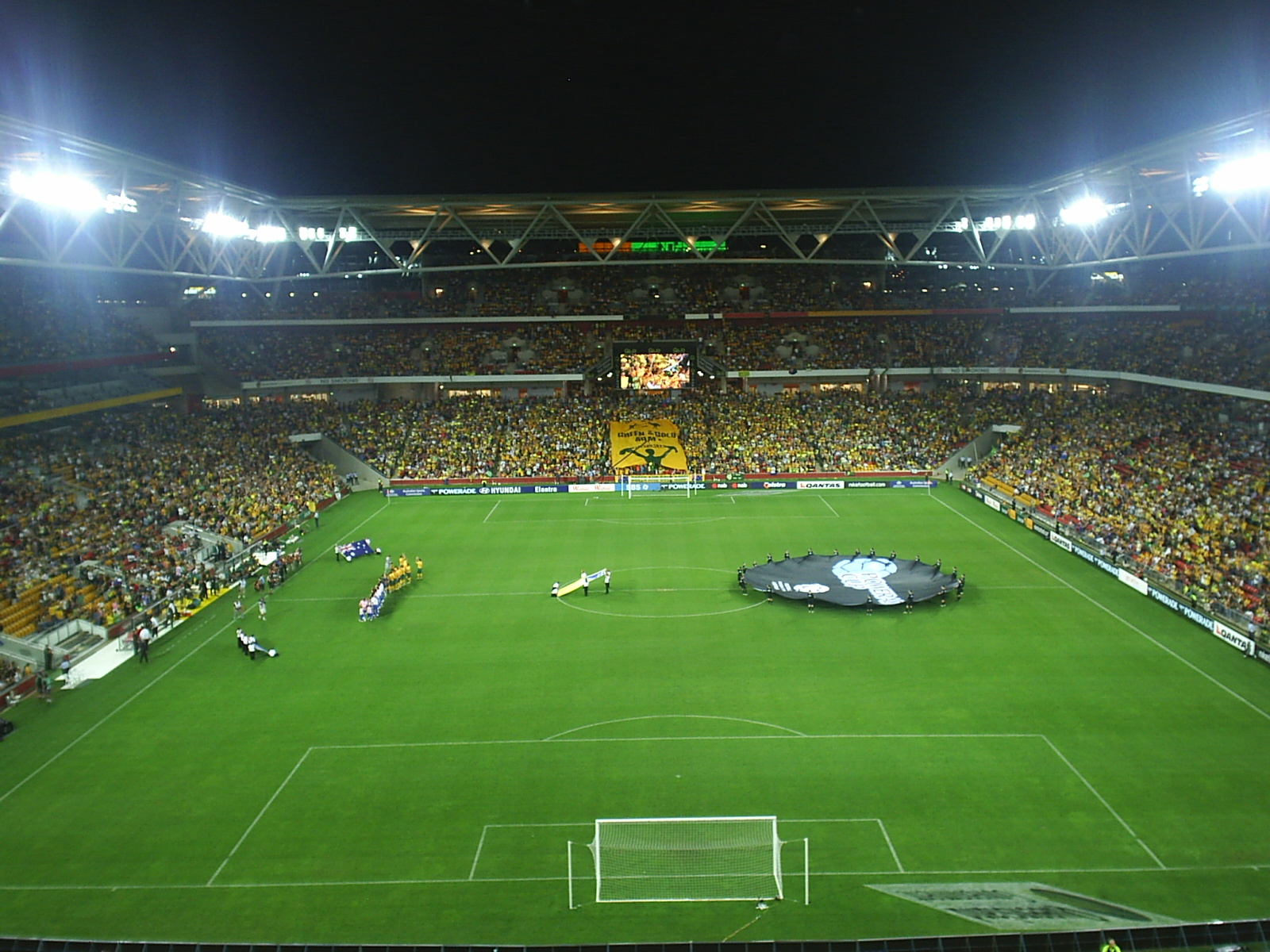
Suncorp Stadium (Watpac), Australia

Al Janoub Stadium, Al Wakrah, Qatar

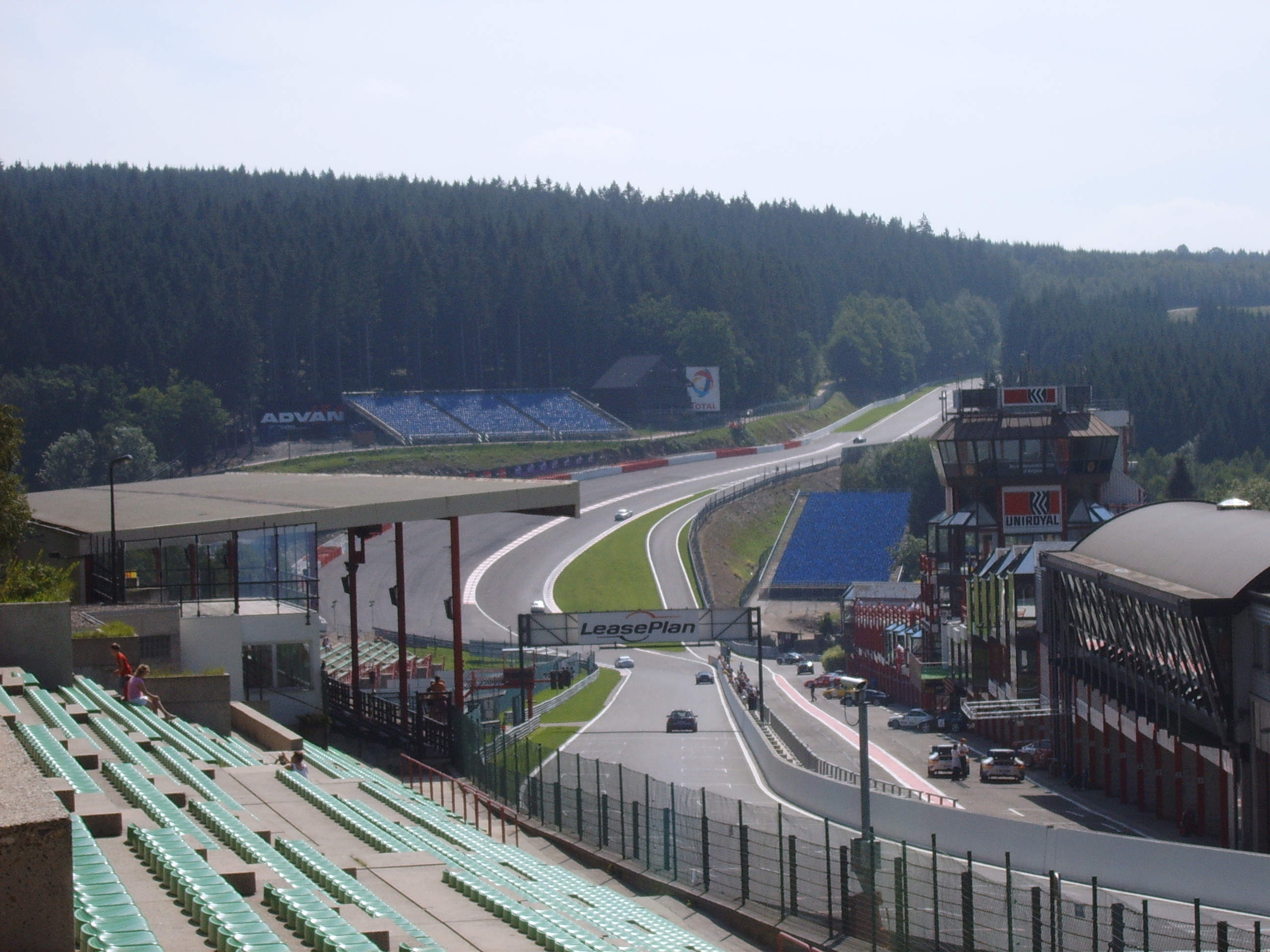
Circuit de Spa-Francorchamps, Belgium

== History ==
- BESIX Group was founded in 1909 by the Stulemeijer family under the name Société Belge des Bétons (SBB). After the First World War, the company participated in the reconstruction of Belgian ports and waterways destroyed during the conflict.
- In 1920, the SBB expanded its construction activities into several European countries, particularly France and Spain, and then into Africa from the end of the 1940s.
- In 1966, SBB created a subsidiary, Six Construct, to take charge of major development projects in the Middle East: via Six Construct, BESIX became in the ensuing decades a driving force in the development of the Arabian Peninsula, particularly in the United Arab Emirates and Qatar.
- In 1988, SBB diversified into the field of real estate development. This branch would develop rapidly in the following decades via Betonimmo, which later became BESIX RED, operating in various European countries including Belgium, France, the Netherlands, Portugal and Luxembourg.
- In 2004, 13 SBB senior managers, with the support of Orascom, carried out a Leveraged Management Buy-Out. The group was thereupon delisted from the stock market and renamed BESIX Group. Johan Beerlandt, who had been with the company since 1974, became its new CEO. In the following years, BESIX's turnover increased from 850 million euros in 2004 to 3.1 billion in 2011.
- In 2009, BESIX celebrated its centenary. The anniversary coincided with the inauguration of the Burj Khalifa, the tallest tower in the world, built by BESIX in collaboration with Arabtec and Samsung Engineering & Construction.
- In 2017, Rik Vandenberghe succeeded Johan Beerlandt as CEO of BESIX, after 12 years as CEO of ING Bank. Johan Beerlandt became chairman of the board.
- In 2018, BESIX strengthened its position in Australia by acquiring, through a public takeover bid, all the shares of construction company Watpac Ltd. In the same year, the group acquired several companies in Europe, including interior decoration specialist Flamant.
- In 2019, BESIX 3D prints the world's largest 3D printed facade in Dubai and announces new contracts comprising the design and construction the Rail Baltica Central Station project, the largest infrastructure project in the Baltic region for 100 years.
- In 2020, BESIX announces new projects comprising the construction of the Saint-Denis–Pleyel station, one of the largest stations of the Grand Paris Express.
- In 2021, Pierre Sironval succeeds Rik Vandenberghe and becomes Deputy CEO of BESIX Group. It was announced that BESIX would build the Guggenheim Abu Dhabi, Europe's largest hybrid-timber building in Amsterdam, one of the world's largest Waste-to-Energy plant in the UAE and the 400 meters Tower F in Abidjan, Africa's tallest tower.

== Environment ==
BESIX participates in the construction, management and maintenance of waste-to-energy and waste recycling projects, as well as wastewater treatment plants, water reuse facilities and drinking water treatment plant. These include one of the largest drinkable water treatment plant in West Africa, in La Mé (Ivory Coast). In Dubai, the group is notably building the world's largest thermal waste recycling plants.

In the Benelux region, BESIX has built energy-neutral infrastructure. These include sewage treatment plants as well as infrastructures. In Belgium, BESIX's subsidiary Jacques Delens has notably built the first passive office building in Brussels, has won the be.circular award in 2018 and 2019, an award which promotes circular economy in the Belgian construction sector, and has participated to the construction of the first neighborhood in the world to be officially certified BREEAM Outstanding.

In Cameroon, BESIX participates to the construction of the Nachtigal Hydropower Project, which will produce up to one-third of the country's electricity.

BESIX participated in the construction of the first high-rise building in the world to obtain both LEED Platinum certification (Leadership in Energy and Environmental Design) and High Environmental Quality (HQE) certification, for the Carpe Diem tower in the Parisian district of La Défense). In Africa, BESIX has begun building one of Africa's tallest towers, the Mohammed VI Tower, which will also be one of the first high-rise buildings in Africa to achieve dual LEED Gold and HQE certification.

== Engineering and innovation ==
BESIX has an internal engineering department which undertakes the design work and technical studies for its construction sites, especially for skyscrapers, marine infrastructures and civil engineering works.

In 2020, BESIX Engineering was awarded the first worldwide Building Information Modeling (BIM) standard (ISO 19650-2). In 2017, BESIX was the first Belgian construction company and the first general contractor in Europe to achieve maximum certification level in BIM In 2018, BESIX and its subsidiary Vanhout took awards in each category presented at the 2018 BIM Awards. In the 2017 BIM Awards, BESIX took awards in five out of six categories, also winning the BIM Award of the Year.

In 2018, BESIX and Proximus, the leader in Belgium's ICT and Telecommunications sectors, set up a partnership to jointly develop a new generation of Smart Buildings, with priority to solutions promoting energy efficiency, comfort and safety. In 2019, the companies inaugurated their very first smart building in Dordrecht, in the Netherlands.

BESIX has developed initiatives in the field of Open Innovation. These comprise the Clean Air project, developed by BESIX employees, that has made it possible to create plant walls for tunnels and roads for treating CO_{2}. In Dubai, other BESIX employees have developed 3D concrete printing solutions: in 2020, they have printed the world's largest 3DCP façade.

== Sponsorship ==
In the sports area, BESIX has since 2017 been an official sponsor of the Belgium National football team, the Red Devils. BESIX also supports the Belgium women's national football team, the Red Flames, and the national youth teams.

The BESIX Foundation operates in the sectors of the environment (renewable energies, waste treatment), education (literacy, vocational training) and construction (access to housing, sustainable construction). Created in 2009, it supports existing non-profit organizations, either through project financing or through skills provision.

== Working conditions in the Middle East ==
BESIX Group is a signatory to an International Framework Agreement on fair labour standards with the Building and Wood Workers' International (BWI), a global union federation, and its European Works Council (EWC). BESIX's commitment to international trade union associations follows regular criticism of construction companies and the working conditions of migrant workers in the Middle East. The agreements signed with BWI are based on the respect of international standards and the conventions of the International Labour Organization (ILO).

- In 2017, the Chairman of the ILO Governing Body highlighted the differences in working conditions of migrant workers in the Middle East from one company to another, taking BESIX as an example of one of the companies with good practices in the area.
- In 2019, the director of Amnesty International in Belgium presented BESIX as the example to follow in terms of respect for workers' rights, particularly in Qatar. He repeated similar comments in 2021 on the Belgian television channels BX1 and LN24.
- In 2022, BESIX, Belgian trade unions FGTB-ABVV and CSC-ACV, and BWI officially called upon the International Labour Organization (ILO) to recognize occupational health and safety as a fundamental right.

Going beyond the ILO rules, BESIX has implemented various initiatives for the benefit of migrant workers, for example in terms of health coverage or quality of housing. BESIX also organizes training courses for them in IT.

On a number of occasions since 2013, Six Construct, BESIX's subsidiary in the Middle East, has been awarded the Corporate Social Responsibility label of the Dubai Chamber of Commerce and Industry. The label is the highest recognition of Corporate Social Responsibility in the United Arab Emirates.

The group is a member of the United Nations Global Compact programme.
