= Maroc Telecom HQ =

Skyscraper in Rabat, Morocco

- Interactive map of the Maroc Telecom HQ area

General information
- Status: Completed
- Type: Office
- Location: Rabat, Morocco, Avenue Annakhil, Rabat, Morocco
- Coordinates: 33.95844°N 6.87101°E
- Construction started: 2008
- Completed: 2012
- Owner: Maroc Telecom

Height
- Antenna spire: 139 m (456 ft)
- Roof: 91 m (299 ft)

Technical details
- Structural system: Concrete
- Floor count: 20
- Floor area: 29,700 m^{2} (320,000 sq ft)

Design and construction
- Architects: Agence Jean-Paul Viguier et Associés; Omar Kobbite
- Structural engineer: Setec Bâtiment; Terrell Group
- Main contractor: Artelia

The Maroc Telecom HQ is a high-rise office building in the Hay Ryad district of Rabat, Morocco. Built between 2008 and 2012, the tower stands at an official height of 139 m (456 ft) tall by antenna spire with 20 floors and is the current third tallest building in Morocco as well as the tallest in Rabat.

== History ==
=== Architecture ===
The building is located in the Hay Ryad business district and is the headquarters of the telecommunications company Maroc Telecom. It is 91 metres tall (139 metres including the antenna) and has 20 floors. It also houses an exhibition hall, a museum, a restaurant and an auditorium with a capacity of 600 people. The facility opened in 2013 and its inauguration included a ceremony that included fireworks, artists and performances, costing about 5 million Moroccan dirhams.

The tower has curtain wall glass-panel facades and the access to the office areas is facilitated by 13 elevators. The upper levels of the building house auditoriums and presentation spaces. The tower has received recognition for providing high-standard environmental friendly systems with particular attention towards energy management.

The tower needed to embody the elegance and promise of tradition while also appearing contemporary. Hence, the design was shaped by the delicate interplay that characterizes the finest edifices in the nation: interior and exterior, simplicity and opulence, warmth and chilliness, and so forth. These do not convey opposing relationships but instead create enchanting connections among themselves.

The tower emerges from a vast, clean parallelepiped-shaped block that encompasses the entire surface area. By sliding two halves of the volume diagonally, two prisms are created, uncovering the "original" interior of the shape. Only the foundation of the tower stays whole as if embedded in the earth. This generates an architectural approach that blends light and shadow, fragility and strength. The structure features a 27-metre overhang at its peak, leaving a strong impact on the viewer.

== Gallery ==
Night view of Maroc Telecom HQ

Daytime view of Maroc Telecom HQ

== See also ==
- List of tallest buildings in Morocco
- List of tallest buildings in Africa
