= Casablanca Finance City =

Financial and business hub in Casablanca, Morocco

Casablanca Finance City القطب المالي للدار البيضاء
- Business district
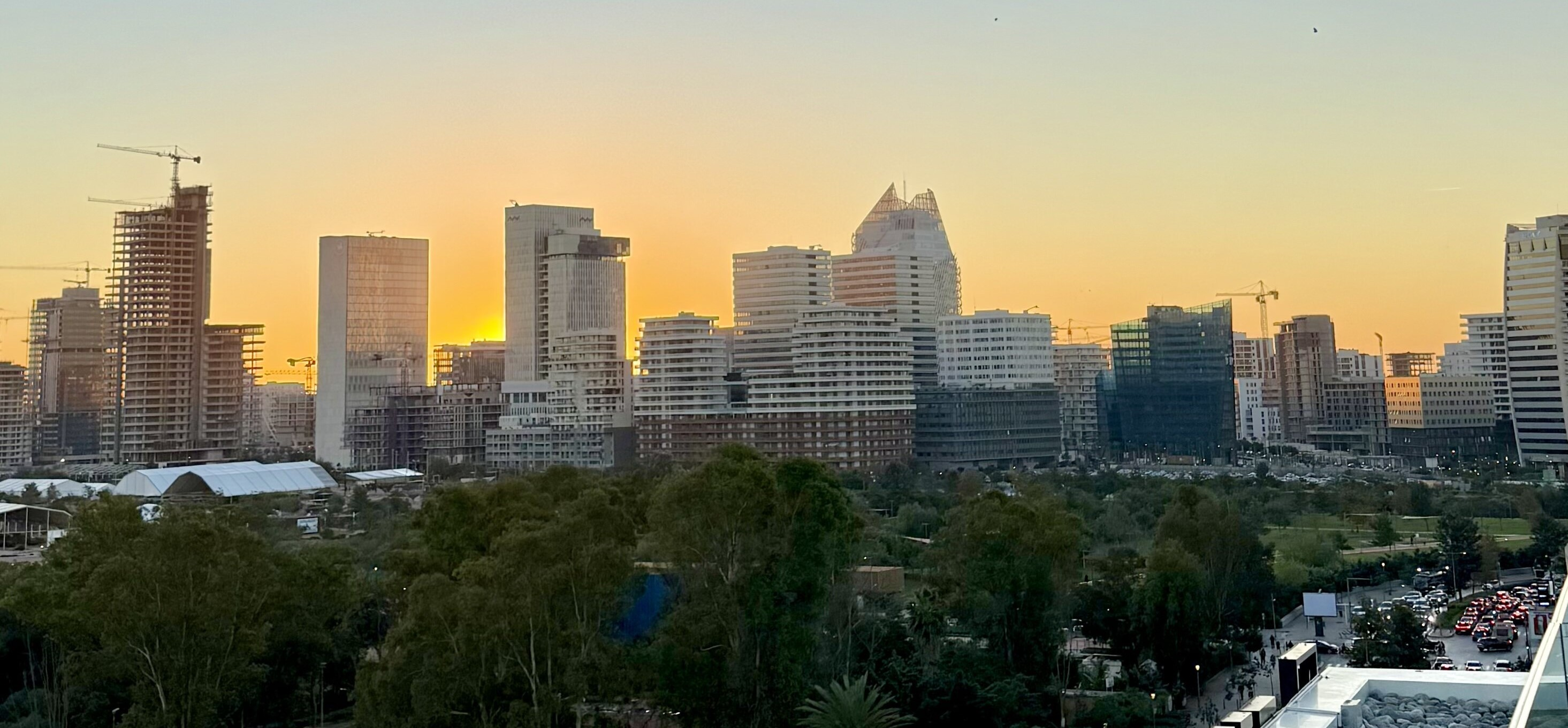

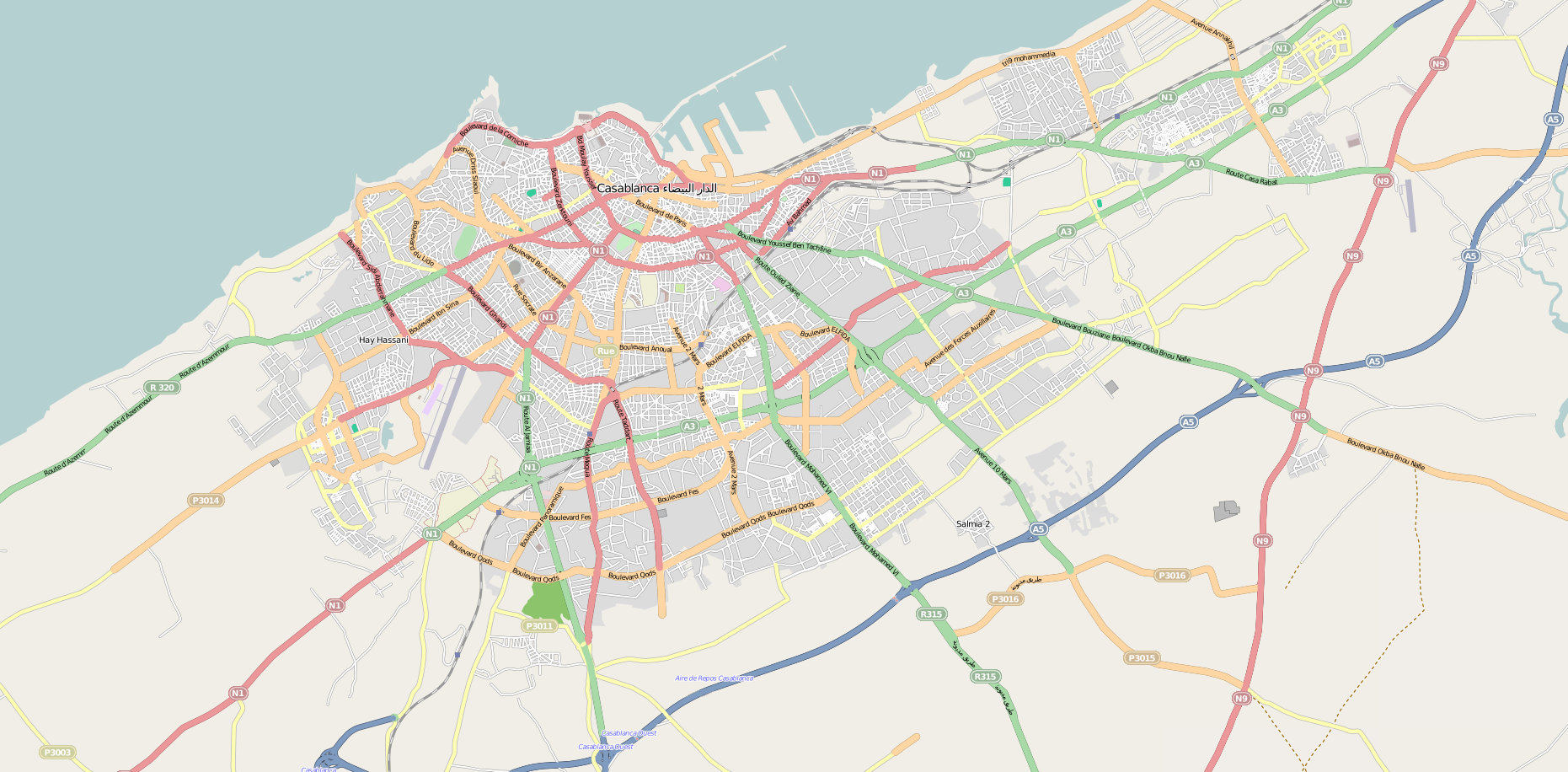
- Location in Greater Casablanca
- Coordinates: 33.5569°N 7.6606°W
- Country: Morocco
- Region: Casablanca-Settat
- City: Casablanca
- Established: 2010

Government
  - Body: Casablanca Finance City Authority
- Website: casablancafinancecity.com

Casablanca Finance City (CFC; Arabic: القطب المالي للدار البيضاء) is a financial and business center located in Casablanca, Morocco. It serves as a regional hub for financial institutions, multinational corporations, and professional service firms operating in Africa.

CFC is listed in the Global Financial Centres Index and has consistently ranked as the leading financial center in Africa and among the top financial hubs globally.

== Overview ==
CFC was established by Law No. 44-10 in December 2010. The law introduced the "CFC Status," which grants specific financial and regulatory advantages to companies operating from the center. The Casablanca Finance City Authority (CFCA), a public entity, oversees its management and promotion.

The CFC compound is located on the site of the former Casablanca–Anfa Airport, which has been redeveloped into a modern business district. The area includes office towers, residential units, hotels, and related infrastructure.

=== Rankings ===
Casablanca Finance City joined the Global Financial Centres Index (GFCI) in 2014. In the GFCI 19 report (April 2016), CFC was ranked first in Africa and 33rd globally. CFC has consistently maintained its position as the top financial center in Africa. As of 2025, it remained ahead of other regional centers such as Johannesburg, Nairobi, Mauritius, and Kigali.

== Membership ==
By the end of 2015, over 100 companies had obtained CFC Status. As of 2024, this number exceeded 200, including international banks, law firms, multinational headquarters, and investment funds. These companies operate across various African markets using Casablanca as a base for regional coordination.

== Global impact ==
=== Tax regime reform and EU grey list ===
When CFC was launched in 2010, its tax framework granted companies a full corporate tax exemption for five years, followed by a reduced rate of 8.75%, compared with a standard rate of up to 30% elsewhere in Morocco. The European Union came to regard this preferential package as unfair tax competition, and in 2017 placed Morocco on its "grey list" of non-cooperative tax jurisdictions.

To address these concerns, Morocco amended the CFC tax framework, notably through a decree-law adopted on 1 October 2020 that also broadened the range of activities eligible for CFC status. The reform introduced a uniform 15% rate for companies establishing themselves after 2020, while preserving the five-year exemption; the older, more favourable 8.75% regime remained available for two more years to firms already installed. Despite the reform's entry into force, Morocco remained on the EU grey list as of October 2020, since the OECD had not yet reviewed the changes: its relevant committee had not convened since February 2020 because of disruptions linked to the COVID-19 pandemic, pushing any reassessment to the following update in February 2021.

The loss of the original tax advantage, combined with the reputational effect of the grey-listing, weighed on CFC's momentum: new company registrations slowed to roughly twenty in 2020, down from forty in 2019, and CFC fell seven places in the Global Financial Centres Index to 53rd worldwide by September 2020. CFC's director general attributed part of this slowdown to the exogenous shock of the pandemic, set a target of recruiting forty to fifty new companies in 2021, and acknowledged that the initial goal of 500 member companies by 2025 was unlikely to be met.

In February 2021, EU member states formally withdrew Morocco from the grey list (Annex II) following a positive OECD assessment of the CFC reform, alongside corrections to two other preferential regimes — those covering export free zones and exporting companies — introduced through the 2020 Finance Law. By 2022, CFC had continued to expand despite the episode, having attracted more than 200 companies since its launch and maintaining, for five consecutive years, its position as Africa's leading financial centre ahead of Cape Town and Johannesburg in the GFCI rankings.
