= Bollinger =

French Champagne house

Coordinates: 49.0538571°N 4.0077952°E

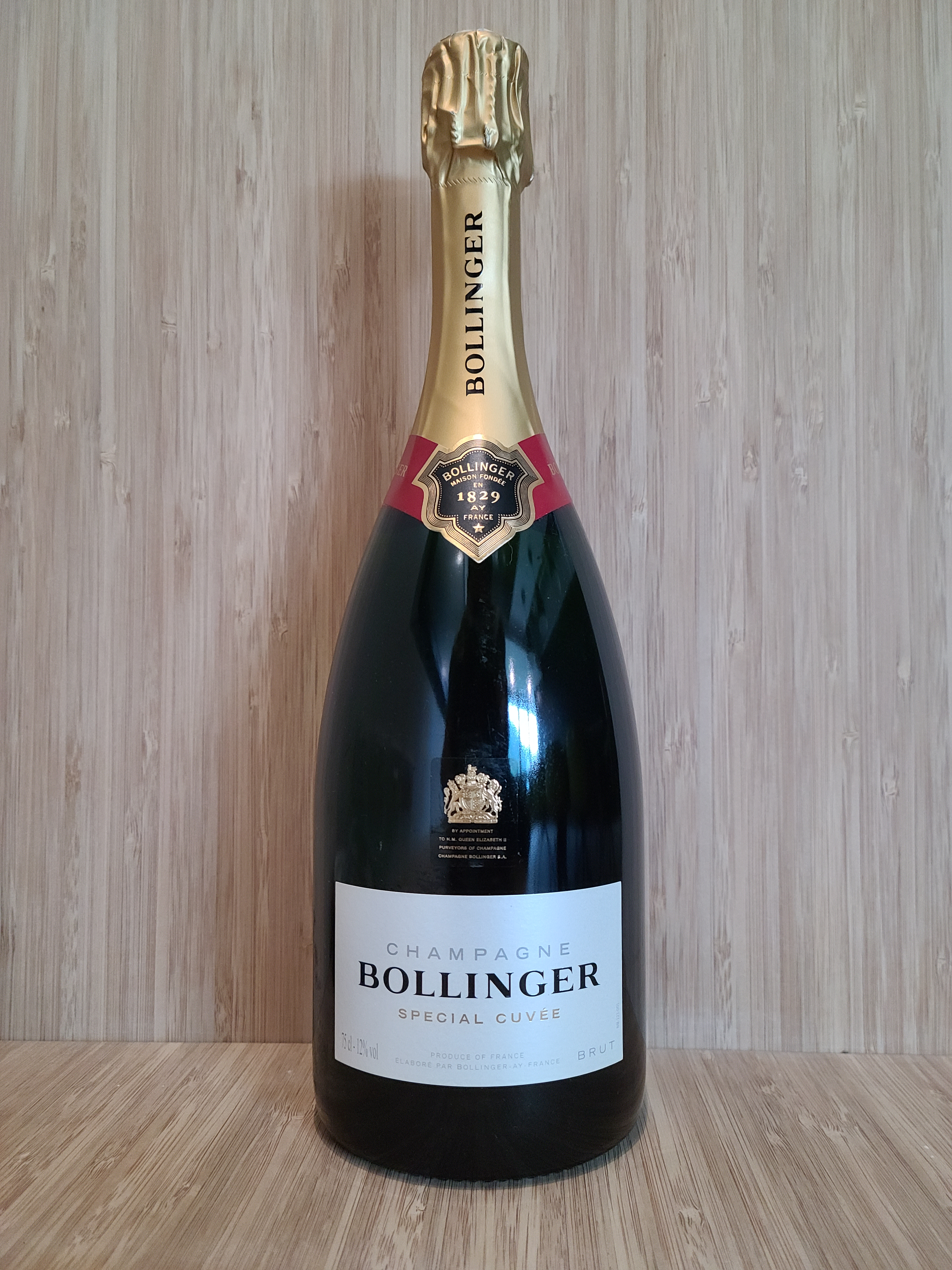
- Wine region: Ay, Marne
- Appellation: Champagne
- Area cultivated: 160 hectares (400 acres)
- Cases/yr: 100,000
- Known for: Vieilles Vignes Françaises and R.D. (prestige); Grande Année and Grande Année Rosé (vintage); Special Cuvée (non-vintage)
- Varietals: Pinot noir, Chardonnay, Pinot Meunier
- Website: www.champagne-bollinger.com

Bollinger (French pronunciation: [bɔlɛ̃ʒe]) is a French Champagne house, a producer of luxury sparkling wines from the Champagne region. They produce several labels of Champagne under the Bollinger name, including the vintage Vieilles Vignes Françaises, Grande Année and R.D. as well as the non-vintage Special Cuvée. Founded in 1829 in Aÿ by Hennequin de Villermont, Paul Renaudin and Jacques Bollinger, the house continues to be run by members of the Bollinger family. In 1884, Bollinger received a Royal Warrant from Queen Victoria.

Bollinger has been featured in the James Bond film series for several decades, beginning in 1973 in the film Live and Let Die and more recently in the films Casino Royale and Skyfall. A 40th-anniversary wine, the Special Cuvée 007 Limited Edition, was released for the 2021 film, No Time To Die.

== History ==
Bollinger has roots in the Champagne region dating back to 1585 when the Hennequins, one of the Bollinger founding families, owned land in Cramant. Before the Bollinger house was founded, in the 18th century the Villermont family practised wine making, though not under their family name. In 1750, Villermont settled in the location 16 rue Jules Lobet, which would eventually become the head office for Bollinger.

In 1803 Jacob Joseph Placidus Bollinger (or Jacques Joseph Placide Bollinger as he called himself in France) was born in Ellwangen, in the Kingdom of Württemberg. In 1822, he moved to the Champagne region and began work at the Champagne house of Muller Ruinart, which no longer exists. Many other German nationals came to settle in the Champagne region, including Johann-Josef Krug and the Heidsiecks, who founded a house that would become Charles Heidsieck, Piper Heidsieck, Heidsieck & Co Monopole, Veuve Clicquot and others.

The Champagne house Renaudin Bollinger was founded on 6 February 1829 in Aÿ by Hennequin de Villermont, Paul Levieux Renaudin and Jacques Bollinger. The partners agreed that the Villermont name would not be used on the labels, hence the house name Renaudin Bollinger. Starting when Jacques Bollinger married Charlotte de Villermont, the house has been managed by the Bollinger family. Even though Paul Renaudin passed without an heir to his name, the label did not become solely Bollinger until the 1960s.

Founder Jacques Joseph Bollinger married Charlotte de Villermont. The couple had a daughter, Marie, who had two sons Joseph and Georges. These sons took over the company in 1885 and began expanding the family estate by purchasing vineyards in nearby villages.

=== Expansion under Lily Bollinger ===
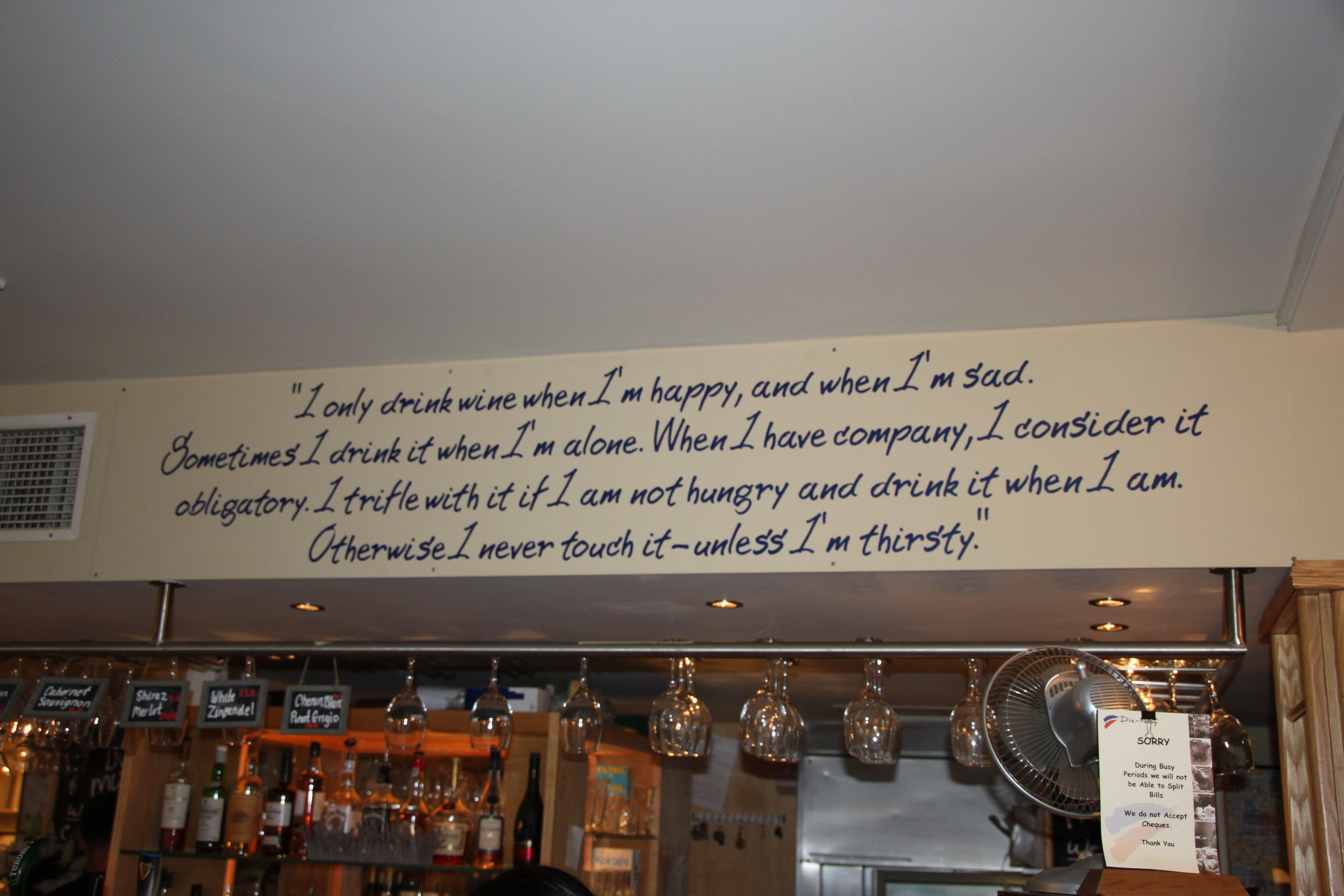
A notice showing Lily Bollinger's saying about champagne (St Peter Port, Guernsey)

In 1918 Jacques Bollinger, the son of Georges, took over the company. Jacques married Élisabeth Law de Lauriston Boubers, known as "Lily". Jacques further expanded the facilities by building new cellars, purchasing the Tauxières vineyards, and acquiring the assets of another Champagne house on Boulevard du Maréchal de Lattre de Tassigny, where Bollinger's offices are presently located.

When Jacques Bollinger died in 1941, Lily Bollinger took over. Lily expanded production through the purchase of more vineyards, but is better known for traveling the world to promote the brand. Lily was well-publicized in the Champagne region, leaving several noteworthy quotes.

I drink [wine] when I’m happy and when I’m sad. Sometimes I drink it when I’m alone. When I have company I consider it obligatory. I trifle with it if I’m not hungry and drink it when I am. Otherwise, I never touch it—unless I’m thirsty.

Lily managed Bollinger until 1971, when her nephews Claude d'Hautefeuille and Christian Bizot succeeded her.

=== Modern day ===
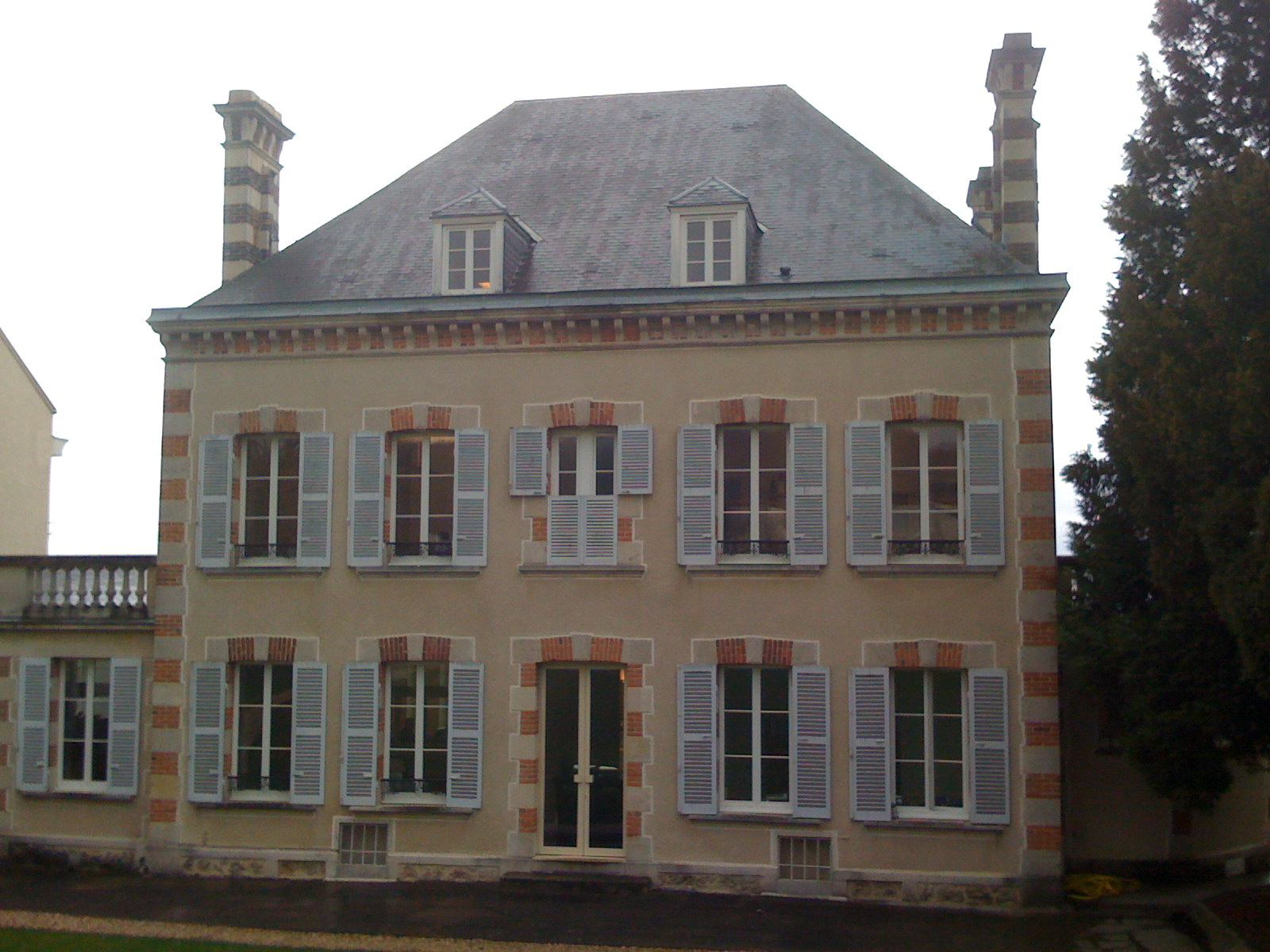
Bollinger Champagne house in Ay

Bollinger was modernized under the direction of Claude d'Hautefeuille, who acquired additional vineyards and developed the brand internationally. Following Claude, his cousin Christian Bizot took over the Bollinger house. In addition to expanding the world distribution of Bollinger, Bizot developed a Charter of Ethics and Quality in 1992. Since 1994, Ghislain de Mongolfier has managed Bollinger. A great-grandson of the founder, Mongolfier has also served as president of the Association Viticole Champenoise since 2004, after leading the Commission of Champagne for 10 years.

In April 2021, Bollinger finalized a purchase of the Willamette Valley's Ponzi Family Winery in Oregon wine country, on the west coast of the United States. The region is known for its Pinot noir wine grapes, with this purchase establishing another French producer in the American West Coast wine production.

== Wines ==
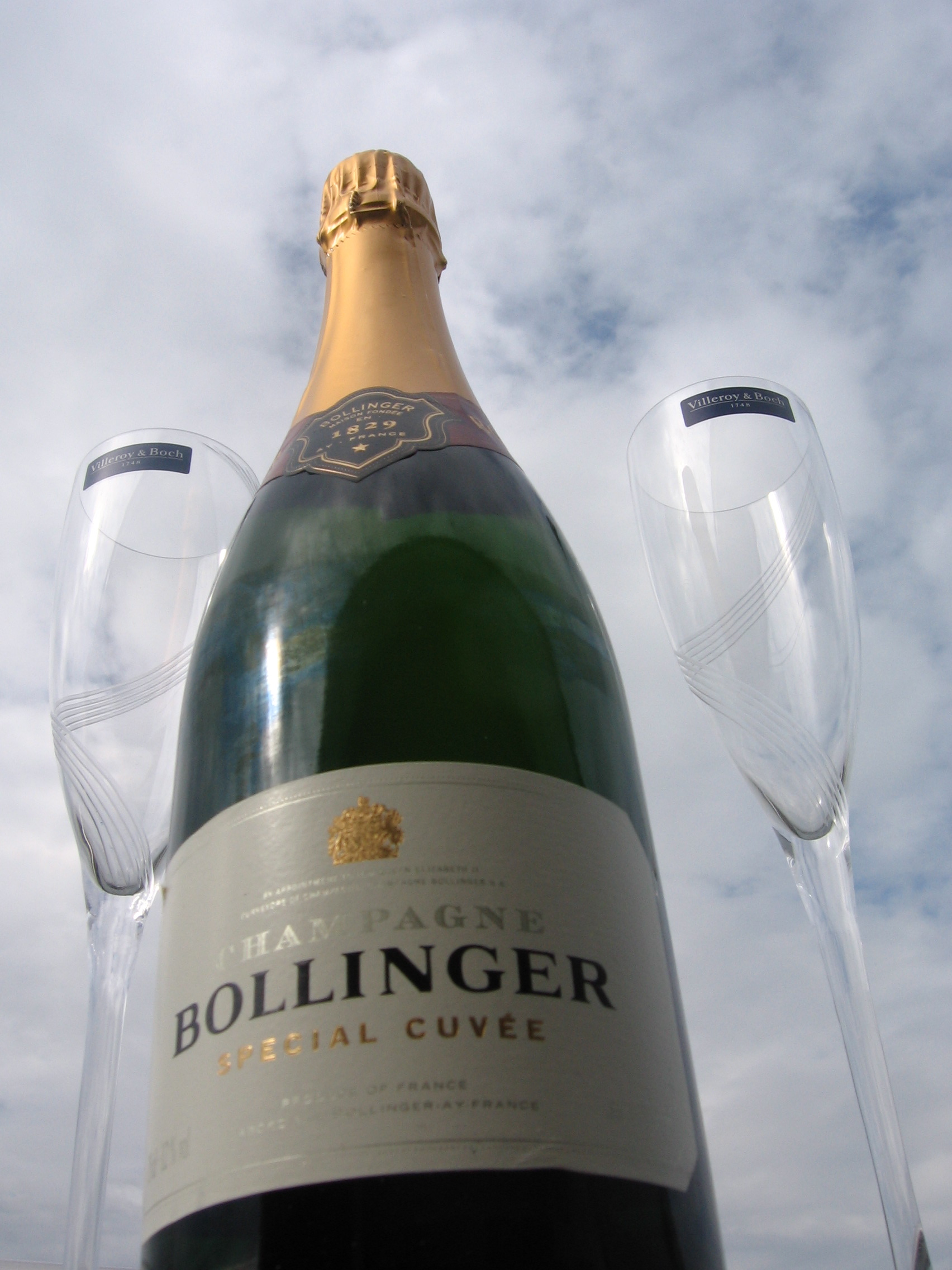
Bollinger's Special Cuvee

Bollinger is one of the few remaining independent Champagne houses. Family-managed since 1889, Bollinger maintains more than 150 hectares of vineyards. It currently produces the following sparkling wines:

- Special Cuvée (non-vintage): The Bollinger house style. This Champagne blend uses grapes from a given year, with the addition of reserve wines. Champagne author Tom Stevenson describes the house style as "classic, Pinot-dominated Champagnes of great potential longevity and complexity" which "tends to go toasty." The blend includes up to 10% reserve wines, which may be up to fifteen years old. Special Cuvée are aged in the lees for at least five years before release. (Composition: 60% Pinot noir, 25% Chardonnay, 15% Pinot Meunier.)
- Grande Année (vintage): this Champagne is also available as a rosé. The wine spends five years on its lees and is aged in bottle under cork, instead of crown seal. (Composition: 65% Pinot noir, 35% Chardonnay.)
- R.D. (vintage): it spends at least eight years on its lees, and like the Grand Année, is aged under cork, not crown seal. R.D. is a registered trademark of Bollinger which stands for récemment dégorgé ("recently disgorged"). In the mid-1990s, Bollinger sold Année Rare, which was an R.D. that had undergone longer aging on the lees.
- Vieille Vignes Françaises (vintage): a blanc de noirs is made in small quantity with wine from two small plots of ungrafted rootstock planted in low density. The English wine writer Cyril Ray suggested the idea of using the ungrafted vines to produce a separate wine to Lily Bollinger in the 1960s. The first vintage was 1969. Vieille Vignes refers to how the vines are trained rather than the age of the rootstock. The low-density vineyards, Clos St-Jacques in Aÿ and Chaudes Terres in Aÿ, are severely pruned, and produce 35% less juice per vine, creating a "super rich wine." In 2005, phylloxera destroyed the third vineyard used for this wine, Croix Rouge in Bouzy.
- Coteaux Champenois La Côte aux Enfants (vintage): This still red wine is produced from grapes grown on the south-facing slope of the 100% echelle vineyard, the Côte aux Enfants in Aÿ.

=== Reserve wines ===
Every harvest, Bollinger saves some wines from the grand crus and premier crus for reserve wines. The reserves are bottled in magnums with cork, under light pressure and aged for five to fifteen years.

== Production ==
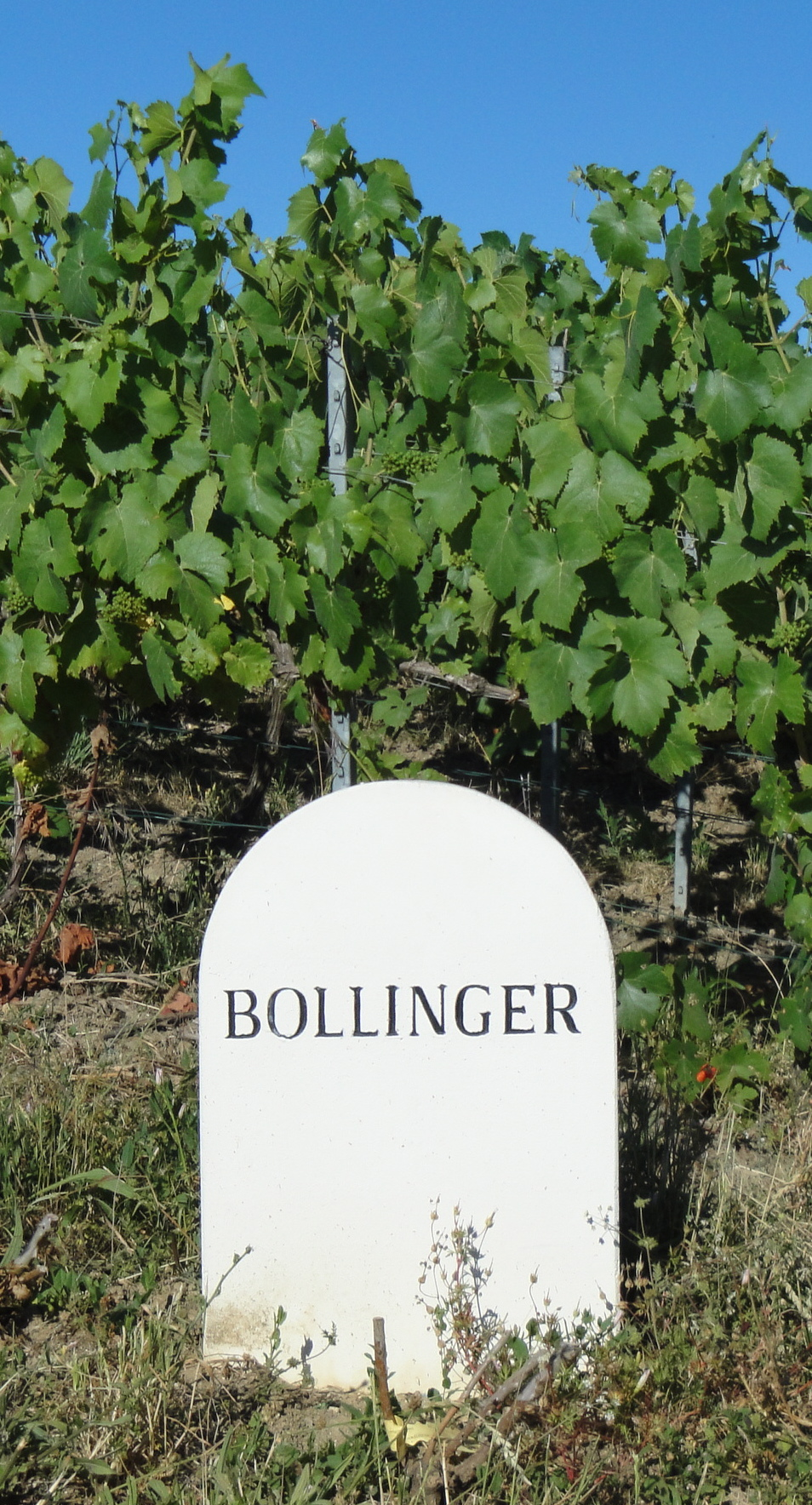
Marker for one of Bollinger's estate vineyards

Bollinger is fermented in oak barrels, and at harvest, usually only the first pressing is used, the cuvée. Bollinger sells some second pressings, the tailles. It utilizes two pressing houses, Louvois and Mareuil sur Aÿ.

The first fermentation is done cru by cru, variety by variety. Wines that will not hold up to first fermentation in wood are vinified in vats. Bollinger Champagnes usually undergo malolactic fermentation, with traditional yeast. Vintage wine, including all wine to be used in a Grande Année, is fermented in small oak barrels, sorted according to origin and variety. Both oak and stainless steel are used for non-vintage wine. The Grande Année and R.D. Champagnes are riddled by hand.

At disgorgement, Bollinger wines are given a low dosage. The company uses 6–9 grams of sugar per litre for the Special Cuvée and La Grande Année. The extra-brut R.D. is dosed between 4 and 5 grams. After dosage, the wines are aged an additional several months, resting for a minimum of three months before shipping. The champagnes are shipped ready to be consumed.

=== Grape supply ===
Bollinger owns nearly 160 hectares of vines, producing more than 60% of its supply. The vines are predominantly Pinot noir, specifically clone 386. The vineyards also include some ungrafted French vines from before the phylloxera epidemic. Bollinger owns vines in the heart of the Champagne region, including the crus of Aÿ, Bouzy and Verzenay.

List of Villages with size of holding and rating

- Avenay-Val-d'Or: 15 hectares of 93% echelle.
- Aÿ: 22 hectares of 100% echelle
- Bisseuil: 5.4 hectares of 93% echelle
- Bouzy: 0.25 hectares of 100% echelle
- Champvoisy: 17 hectares of 84% echelle
- Cuis: 21.15 hectares of 95% echelle
- Grauves: 6.6 hectares of 95% echelle
- Louvois: 15.7 hectares of 100% echelle
- Mutigny: 3.95 hectares of 93% echelle
- Tauxières-Mutry: 17.95 hectares of 99% echelle
- Verzenay: 17 hectares of 100% echelle

== Corporate structure ==
The holding company for Bollinger is Société Jacques Bollinger, whose holdings in France also include Ayala Champagne, Maison Chanson in Burgundy, Langlois-Chateau in the Loire valley and Delamain in Cognac. In Australia, Société Jacques Bollinger has invested in the Tapanappa Winery located in the Wrattonbully wine region in Australia. Other partners in the Tapanappa Winery are Jean Michel Cazes of Château Lynch-Bages and Brian Croser, formerly of Petaluma Winery.

== See also ==
- List of Champagne producers
