= Thiénot =

Champagne Thiénot
- Industry: Winery
- Founded: 1985
- Founder: Alain Thiénot
- Headquarters: 4, rue Joseph Cugnot - 51500 TAISSY
- Products: Champagnes
- Parent: Goupe Alain Thiénot
- Website: Official website

Champagne Thiénot is a Champagne house founded in 1985 and based in Taissy, near from Reims. It is part of the Alain Thiénot Group, owner of different brands such as Canard-Duchêne, Joseph Perrier and Marie Stuart.

== Vineyards ==
Vineyards spanning 27 hectares, of which half are classified as Grand Cru and Premier Cru:

- Grand Cru (6.25 Ha) : Ay, Le Mesnil et Avize
- 1er Cru (7.01 Ha) : Dizy, Cumières, Pierry et Tauxière

== See also ==
- List of Champagne houses
