= Henry Bizot =

French banker (1901–1990)

Henry Bizot (1901–1990) was a French banker, and the first chairman of Banque Nationale de Paris.

In 1964, he became chairman of Comptoir national d'escompte de Paris (CNEP), and in 1966, the first chairman of Banque Nationale de Paris, following CNEP's merger with Banque nationale pour le commerce et l'industrie (BNCI).

His son Christian Bizot married Marie-Hélène, niece of Lily Bollinger, and became head of the Bollinger Champagne house, and the fifth generation to run the family business.
