= Louvois =

Louvois may refer to:

- Louvois, Marne, a French commune
- François-Michel le Tellier, Marquis de Louvois (1641–1691), French secretary of state for war
- Camille le Tellier de Louvois (1675–1718), French clergyman, son of the marquis
- Jehan de Louvois (13th century), French trouvère
- Fontaine Louvois, monumental public fountain in Paris
- Fort Louvois, 17th-century fortification on the Atlantic coast of France
- Louvois (horse)
