= Christian Bizot =

Christian Bizot (1928 – 7 July 2002) was a French winemaker, the head of the Bollinger Champagne house, and the fifth generation to run the family business.

== Biography ==
Christian Bizot was born in Paris in 1928. He was the niece of Lily Bollinger. He was the son of Henry Bizot, president of the Banque Nationale de Paris, and Guillemette Law de Lauriston-Boubers, younger sister of Lily Bollinger.

Bizot joined Bollinger in 1952, aged 24.

Another of her nephews Claude d'Hautefeuille, took over the running of Bollinger when Lily retired in 1971 and ran it until 1978, when Bizot took over as president.

He married Marie-Hélène Balsan, and they had five sons, Henry, Charles, Étienne, Guy and Xavier.

Bizot died on 7 July 2002, aged 73, at his summer home near Grenoble, soon after finishing a round of golf.
