= Dizy, Marne =

Dizy
- Commune
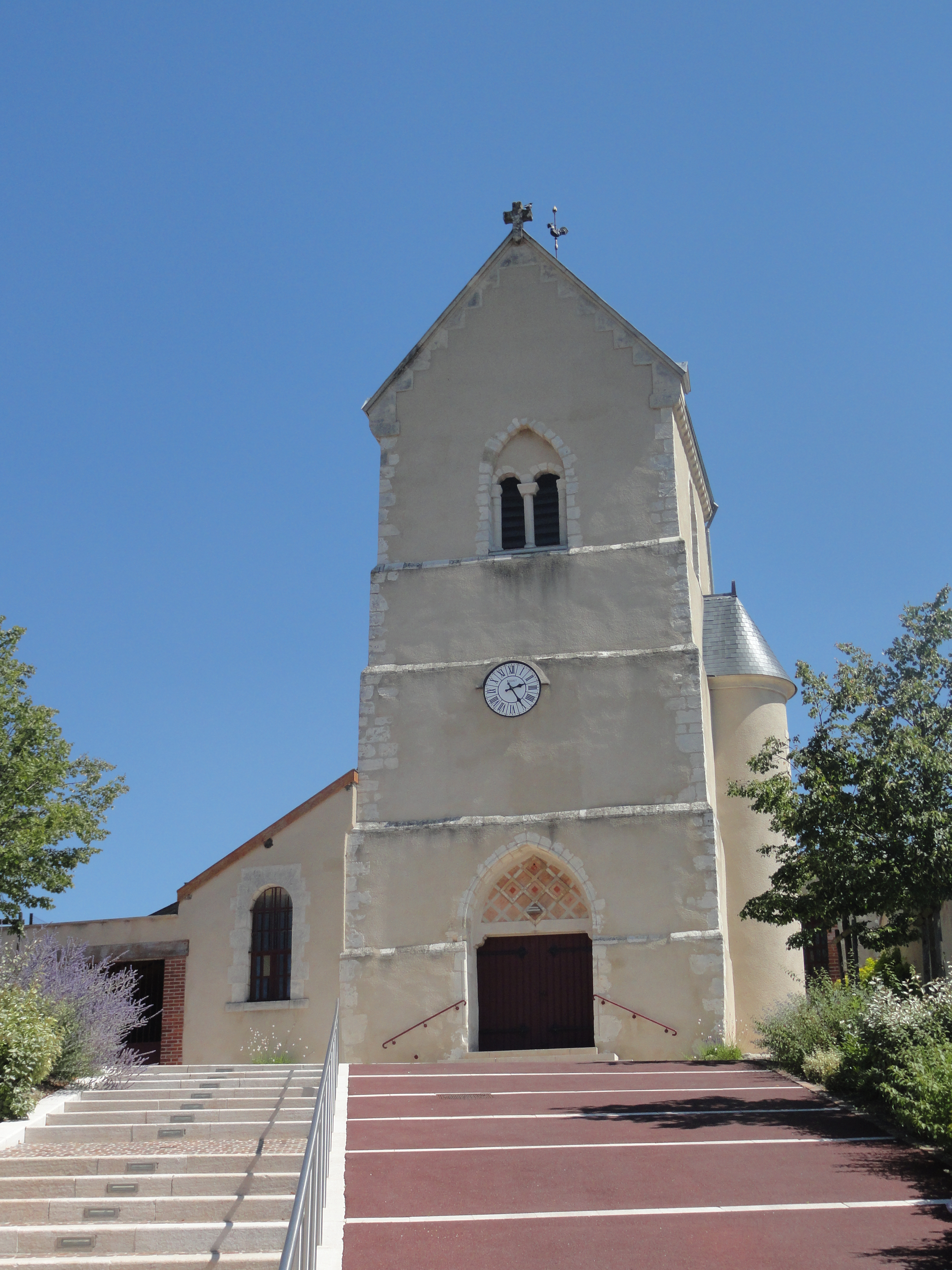
- St-Timothée Church

- Coat of arms
- Location of Dizy
- Location within France Location within Grand Est
- Coordinates: 49°03′58″N 3°58′02″E
- Country: France
- Region: Grand Est
- Department: Marne
- Arrondissement: Épernay
- Canton: Épernay-1
- Intercommunality: Grande Vallée de la Marne

Government
  - Mayor (2020–2026): Antoine Chiquet
- Area^{1}: 3.23 km^{2} (1.25 sq mi)
- Elevation: 72 m (236 ft)
- Highest elevation: 250 m (820 ft)
- Lowest elevation: 69 m (226 ft)
- Population (2023): 1,482
  - Density: 459/km^{2} (1,190/sq mi)
- Time zone: UTC+01:00 (CET)
  - Summer (DST): UTC+02:00 (CEST)
- INSEE/Postal code: 51210 /51350
- ^{1} French Land Register data, which excludes lakes, ponds, glaciers > 1 km^{2} (0.386 sq mi or 247 acres) and river estuaries.

Dizy (French pronunciation: [dizi]) is a commune in the Marne department in north-eastern France.

== Geography ==
Dizy is situated in the Marne valley, on the main road between Épernay (3 km) and Reims (23 km).

The village is north of Magenta, south of Champillon, east of Hautvillers and west of Ay.

== History ==
The place is first mentioned in 662 as Villa Disiacum perhaps owing to the roman surname -Decius.

In 1881, the commune which was called Dizy until 1801, then Dizy-sur-Marne, took the name of Dizy-Magenta. In 1965, when Magenta became independent, the village took again the name of Dizy.

== Demographics ==
The inhabitants of the commune are called Dizyciens.

== Twin towns ==
Dizy is twinned with:

- Sommerach, Germany

== See also ==
- Communes of the Marne department
- Montagne de Reims Regional Natural Park
