= Banque Nationale de Paris =

Former bank in France

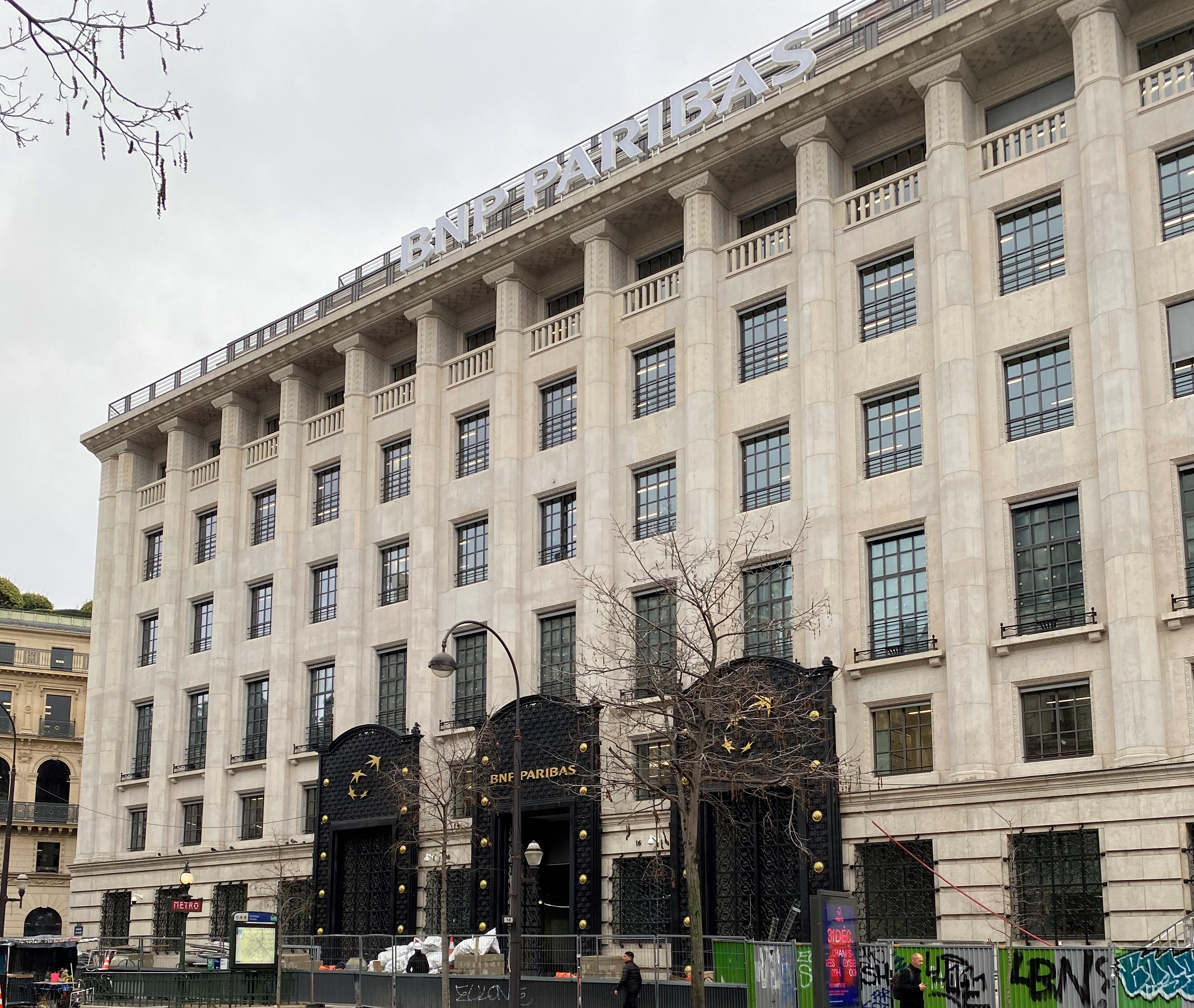
Head office building of BNP inherited from the Banque Nationale pour le Commerce et l'Industrie at 12, boulevard des Italiens in Paris

Banque nationale de Paris (French pronunciation: [bɑ̃k nɑsjɔnal də paʁi]) was a major French bank. It was formed in 1966 through the merger of Comptoir National d'Escompte de Paris (CNEP, est. 1848) and Banque Nationale pour le Commerce et l'Industrie (BNCI, est. 1932). In 1999, BNP initiated a merged with Paribas to form BNP Paribas, completed in 2000.

== Overview ==
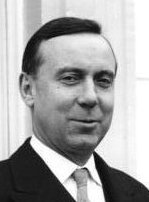
Michel Debré (1912-1996) was the architect of the creation of BNP in 1966

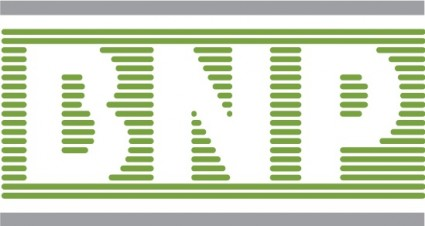
BNP logo adopted in 1987

In 1966, the French government decided to merge the CNEP and BNCI to create BNP, as part of a broader plan of financial sector reform led by finance minister Michel Debré. Among other initiatives, the Debré plan also entailed banking sector liberalization (known as the réforme Debré-Haberer) and the creation of an independent securities commission, the Commission des Opérations de Bourse.

In 1973, BNP employees were allowed to become shareholders, but that opening was reversed in 1982 as the bank was fully renationalized. In 1989, BNP entered a bancassurance partnership with state-owned insurer Union des assurances de Paris (UAP), which later became part of Axa. During the 1980s, the bank's prudent management by longtime CNEP employee René Thomas protected it from the excessive and politicized credit expansion that affected its competitor the Crédit Lyonnais.

The bank was re-privatised in 1993 under the leadership of Michel Pébereau as part of a second Chirac government's privatization policy.

== Partnership with Dresdner Bank ==
Starting in 1988, BNP President René Thomas started exploring a strategic partnership with its German counterpart Dresdner Bank. This materialized in the 1990s with the creation of several 50-50 joint ventures in the central and eastern European countries undergoing post-Communist transition: first in Hungary (1990), then in Czechoslovakia and Russia (1991), Poland (1994), Bulgaria (1995), Croatia (1997), and Romania (1998). The Russian joint venture supported a Dresdner Bank branch in Saint Petersburg and had Matthias Warnig, a former East German Stasi officer and associate of Vladimir Putin, as its chairman. In late 1998, they brought these joint ventures under a jointly owned holding company based in Vienna, Austria. Beyond these regional initiatives, BNP and Dresdner in 1996 signed a broader partnership, which led analysts in the late 1990s to anticipate closer integration between the two institutions. In 1999, a proposed merger between the two was opposed by Allianz, by then a major shareholder of Dresdner Bank and competitor of Axa.

The partnership, which had never been as popular in France as in Germany, was unwound in the wake of the BNP-Paribas merger. In August 2000, Greece's Egnatia Bank acquired the Romanian joint venture. The new group and Dresdner then divided the other joint-venture banks between themselves: BNP Paribas bought out Dresdner in Bulgaria (with 20 percent still owned by the European Bank for Reconstruction and Development), Hungary, and Poland, whereas Dresdner bought out BNP Paribas in Croatia, Czechia, and Russia. In October 2002, the two banks amicably terminated their broader partnership agreement of 1996.

The former joint ventures met various fates. BNP Paribas expanded significantly in Poland with the acquisition of BGZ Bank in 2015, and retained a comparatively smaller-scale activity in both Bulgaria and Hungary, where it ranked 19th in the country by assets by end-2023. Dresdner sold its Croatian subsidiary to Zagrebačka banka in 2005, then was itself acquired by Commerzbank in 2008-2009, which merged the two respective Russian subsidiaries in 2010. Following the Russian invasion of Ukraine in 2022, Commerzbank sharply reduced its exposure in the country, stopped servicing payments in Russia in 2023, and by 2025 was still reducing its legacy operations there. As of 2025, Commerzbank retained the former Dresdner Bank's presence in Czechia. The former Romanian joint venture undertook several cycles of restructuring by which it was successively renamed Egnatia Bank Romania (2001) then Marfin Bank Romania (2008), and has been known as Vista Bank since 2019.

== Leadership ==
- Henry Bizot, Président 1966-1971; previously Président of CNEP 1964-1966
- Pierre Ledoux, Directeur Général 1966-1971, then Président 1971-1979; previously Directeur Général of BNCI 1963-1966
- Jacques Calvet, Directeur Général 1976 -1979, then Président 1979-1982
- Gerard Llewellyn, Directeur Général 1979-1982
- René Thomas, Président 1982-1993
- Jacques Masson, Directeur Général 1982-1987
- Jacques Wahl, Directeur Général 1982-1993
- Daniel Lebègue, Directeur Général 1987-1996
- Michel Pébereau, Président-Directeur Général (PDG) 1993-2000; later PDG of BNP Paribas

== See also ==
- Banque Internationale pour le Commerce et l'Industrie, the network of BNP affiliates in Africa
- Banque Marocaine pour le Commerce et l'Industrie, subsidiary in Morocco
- Union Bancaire pour le Commerce et l'Industrie, subsidiary in Tunisia
- List of banks in France
