= Nanteuil-la-Forêt =

- Commune
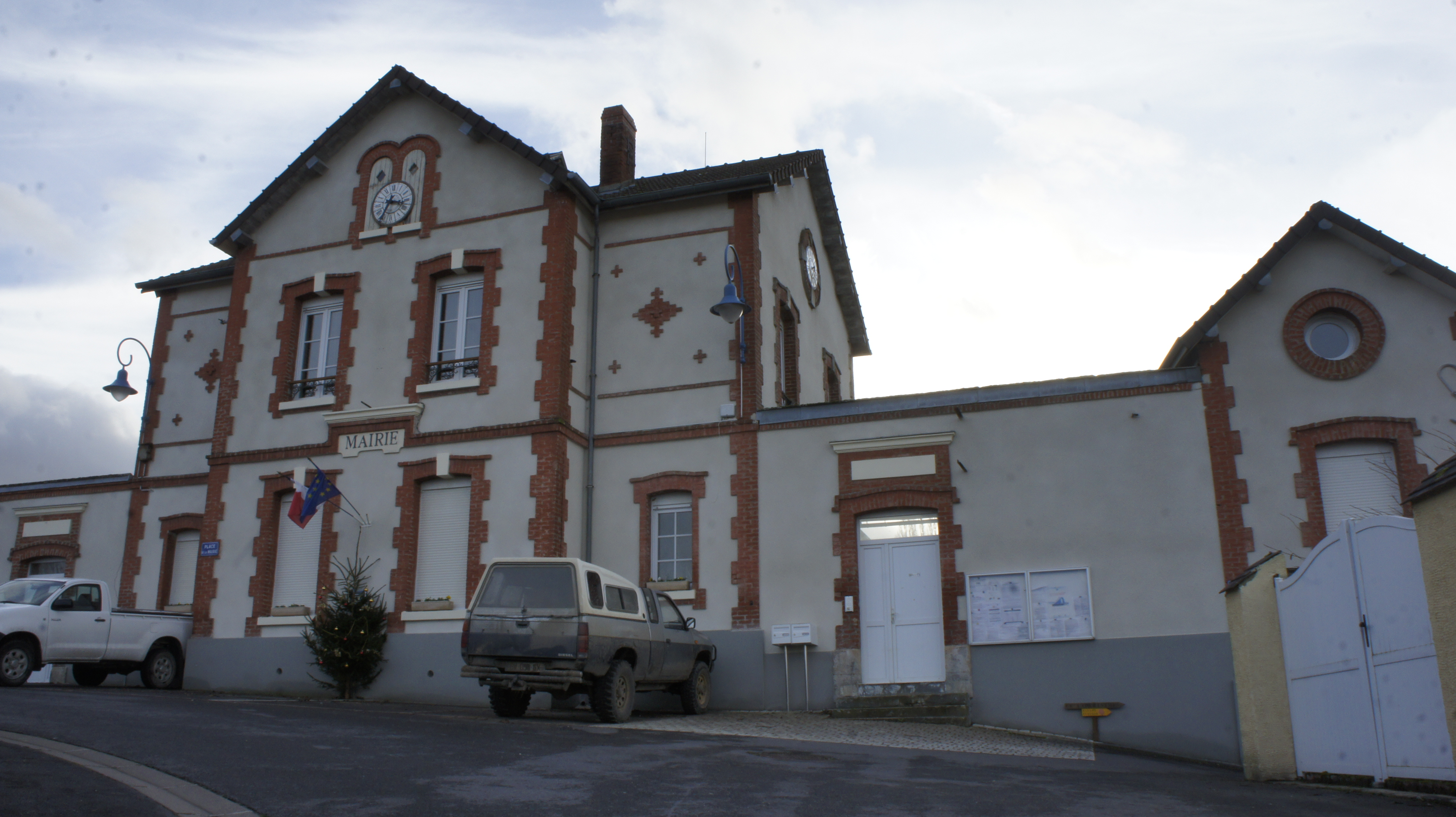
- The town hall in Nanteuil-la-Forêt
- Location of Nanteuil-la-Forêt
- Location within France Location within Grand Est
- Coordinates: 49°07′51″N 3°55′25″E
- Country: France
- Region: Grand Est
- Department: Marne
- Arrondissement: Épernay
- Canton: Épernay-1
- Intercommunality: Grande Vallée de la Marne

Government
  - Mayor (2020–2026): Sébastien Grangé
- Area^{1}: 14.55 km^{2} (5.62 sq mi)
- Elevation: 260 m (850 ft)
- Population (2023): 300
  - Density: 21/km^{2} (53/sq mi)
- Time zone: UTC+01:00 (CET)
  - Summer (DST): UTC+02:00 (CEST)
- INSEE/Postal code: 51393 /51480
- ^{1} French Land Register data, which excludes lakes, ponds, glaciers > 1 km^{2} (0.386 sq mi or 247 acres) and river estuaries.

Nanteuil-la-Forêt (French pronunciation: [nɑ̃tœj la fɔʁɛ]) is a commune in the Marne department in north-eastern France.

== Points of interest ==
- Jardin botanique de la Presle

== See also ==
- Communes of the Marne department
- Montagne de Reims Regional Natural Park
