= Bertha of Val d'Or =

Saint Bertha of Val d'Or
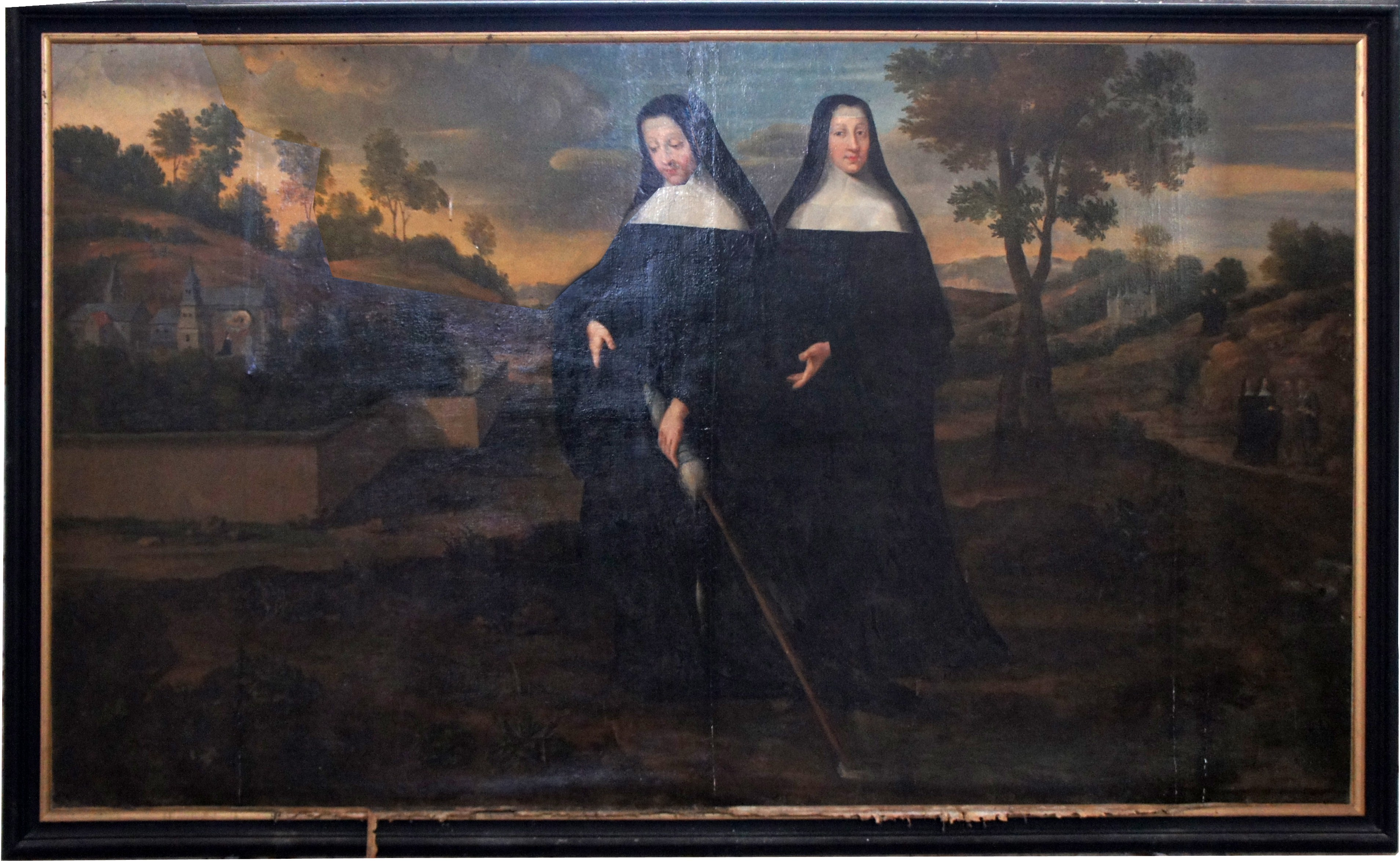

Virgin and martyr
- Born: France
- Died: 690; France
- Venerated in: Roman Catholic Church Eastern Orthodox Church
- Canonized: Pre-Congregation
- Feast: 1 May

Bertha of Val d'Or (birth unknown, death c. 690), was an abbess, virgin, and martyr. She is venerated in the Roman Catholic Church and Eastern Orthodox Church as a saint.

Her husband was Gombert, Lord of Champenois, who was a nobleman and member of the royal family of France, with whom she lived a celibate life. The tradition of Bertha's life is "very late and unreliable". Laurent Majoret wrote a vita that was first published in Toul in 1650 and reissued in Rheims in 1700 and in 1743.

Gombert built a convent for Bertha and her maidens at Avenay, and then retired to a monastery on the coast. After Gombert was killed by "idolaters" and "pagan marauders", she was directed by a vision to move her nuns to Val d'Or, near Avenay, in the Champagne region of northeastern France. It is uncertain if the convent followed the Dominican Rule. There was a drought in the area; according to hagiographer Agnes Dunbar, Peter the Apostle appeared to her and guided her to a garden with a good spring. She created, with her distaff, a stream she called "Libra" because she bought the spring with a pound of silver. The stream flowed in front of her convent and supplied water for both her nuns and for the town; Dunbar reported that "there it flows to this day, an abundant supply of beautiful, clear water, curing many infirmities, and witnessing the truth of the legend of the distaff".

In 690, the relatives of Bertha's husband became angry with her because they were indignant that she distributed her husband's money to the poor and because she "gave to the poor a great deal that they hoped to get for themselves". so they killed her. Dunbar reports that they "were immediately seized by the devil, and tore themselves to pieces, all but one woman named Nuncia, who had some pangs of repentance". Bertha appeared to Nuncia, asking that her husband's body be brought to Val d' Or so that she could be buried with him. Nuncia requested proof that her actions would be forgiven if she granted Bertha's wish; as soon as Nuncia moved Gombert's body to the convent, blood spouted out of her nose and mouth as Bertha had said it would. One hundred years later, Bertha's body was found "fresh and life-like;" when her body and Gombert's were brought to the place where she was killed, "her wounds bled afresh". Bertha's feast day is 1 May.

== Works cited ==
- Dunbar, Agnes B.C. (1901). A Dictionary of Saintly Women. Volume 1. London: George Bell & Sons. pp. 117−118.
