= Fontaine-sur-Ay =

Fontaine-sur-Aÿ
- Commune
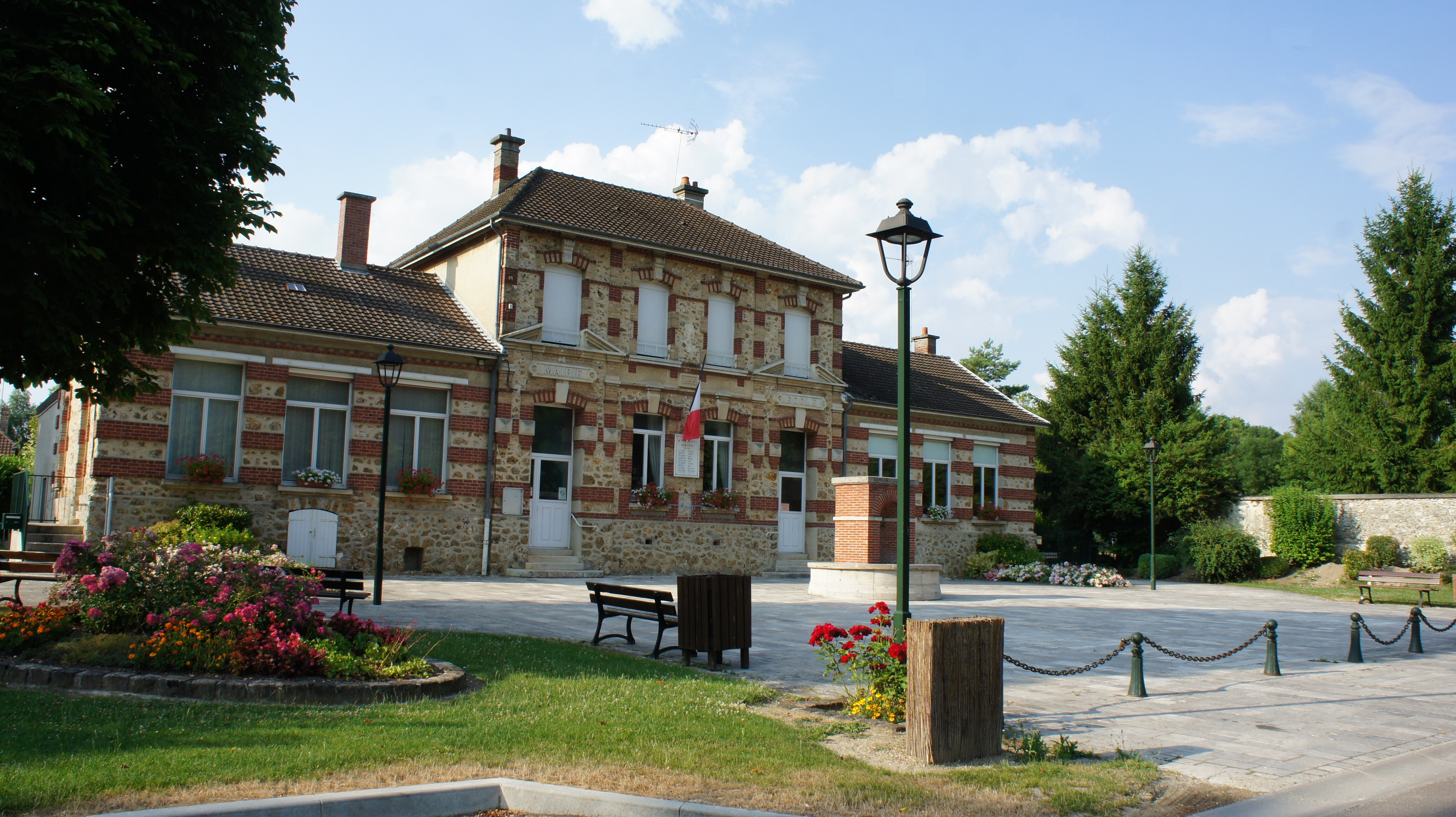
- The town hall in Fontaine-sur-Ay
- Location of Fontaine-sur-Aÿ
- Location within France Location within Grand Est
- Coordinates: 49°04′58″N 4°04′24″E
- Country: France
- Region: Grand Est
- Department: Marne
- Arrondissement: Épernay
- Canton: Épernay-1
- Intercommunality: Grande Vallée de la Marne

Government
  - Mayor (2022–2026): Alain-Louis Gourdy
- Area^{1}: 7.72 km^{2} (2.98 sq mi)
- Elevation: 90 m (300 ft)
- Population (2023): 316
  - Density: 40.9/km^{2} (106/sq mi)
- Time zone: UTC+01:00 (CET)
  - Summer (DST): UTC+02:00 (CEST)
- INSEE/Postal code: 51256 /51160
- ^{1} French Land Register data, which excludes lakes, ponds, glaciers > 1 km^{2} (0.386 sq mi or 247 acres) and river estuaries.

Fontaine-sur-Ay (French pronunciation: [fɔ̃tɛn syʁ aˑji], literally Fontaine on Ay; also Fontaine-sur-Aÿ) is a commune in the Marne department in north-eastern France.This village lies in the Champagne region, known for its sparkling wines. Fontaine-sur-Ay spans an area of 7.72 km², with altitudes ranging between 87 and 271 meters above sea level. Its postal code is 51160.

Two rivers, the Germaine and the Livre, flow through the area, meeting near the village center.

== See also ==
- Communes of the Marne department
- Montagne de Reims Regional Natural Park
