= Jardin botanique de la Presle =

Botanical garden located in La Presle, France

Coordinates: 49°05′56″N 3°52′08″E

The Jardin botanique de la Presle (2 hectares), also known as the Centre botanique de la Presle, is a botanical garden located in La Presle, Nanteuil-la-Forêt, Marne, Champagne-Ardenne, France. It is open daily except Sunday; an admission fee is charged.

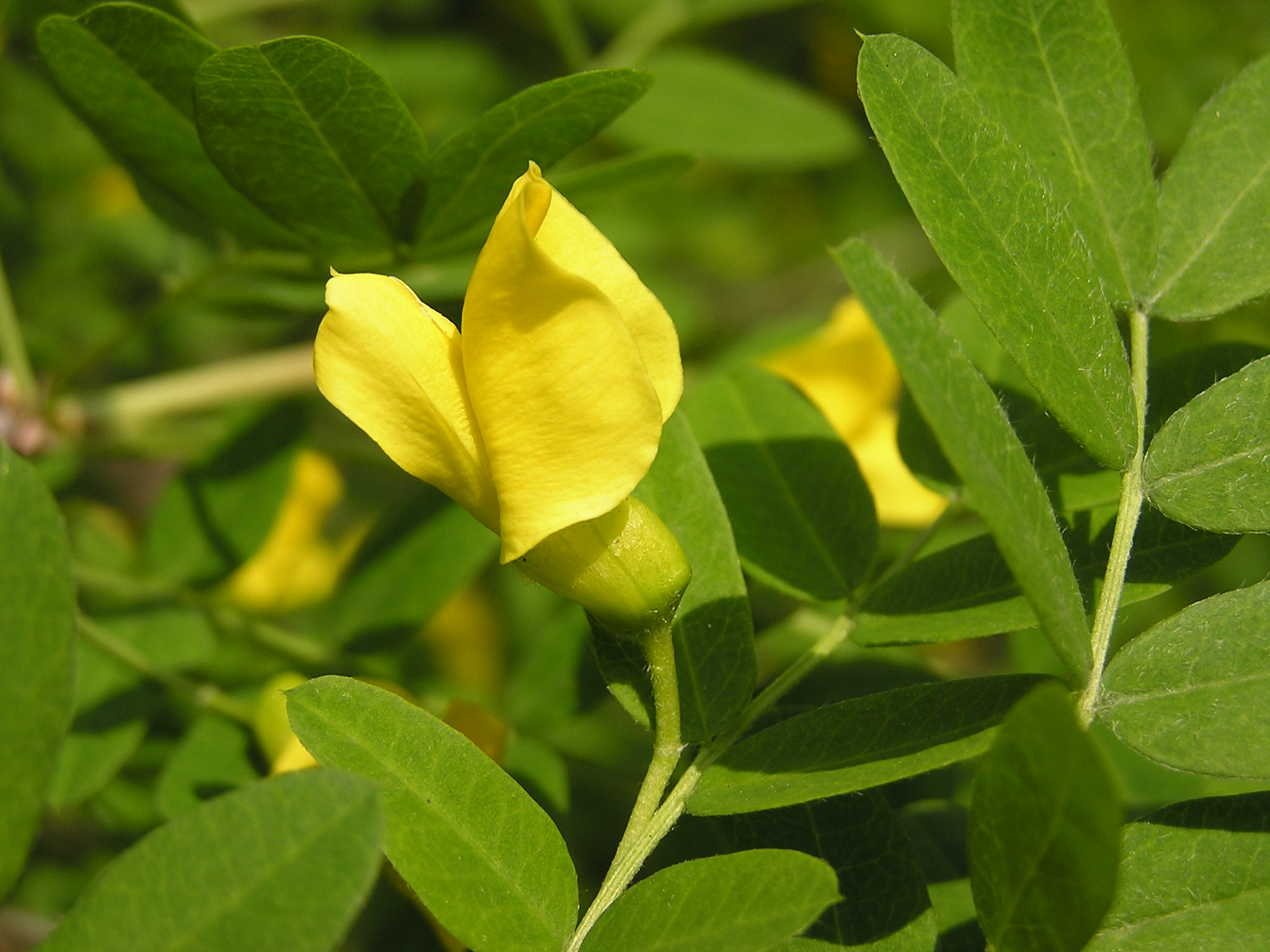
Jardin botanique de la Presle

The garden began as an outgrowth of a private nursery, and evolved over the years in response to travels to Kyrgyzstan, eastern Anatolia, the Balkans, and the Sierra Nevada. In 1995 it was recognized by the Conservatoire des Collections Végétales Spécialisées (CCVS) for its Spirea collection, with three additional recognitions in 2000 for Caragana, saxifrage, and willows (Salix). It became a formal botanical garden in 2001, and in 2005 was named a Jardin Remarquable by the ministry of culture.

Today the garden contains more than 500 old roses; alpine plants, notably from the Central Asian region; good collections of Fabaceae, Lamiaceae, and Lonicera; a wide variety of shrubs including Deutzia, dogwood, hawthorn, and Philadelphus; and a trial collection of Mediterranean plants. It also includes a Caucasian labyrinth and topiary cut into monster shapes.

== See also ==
- List of botanical gardens in France
