= Germaine, Marne =

Germaine
- Commune
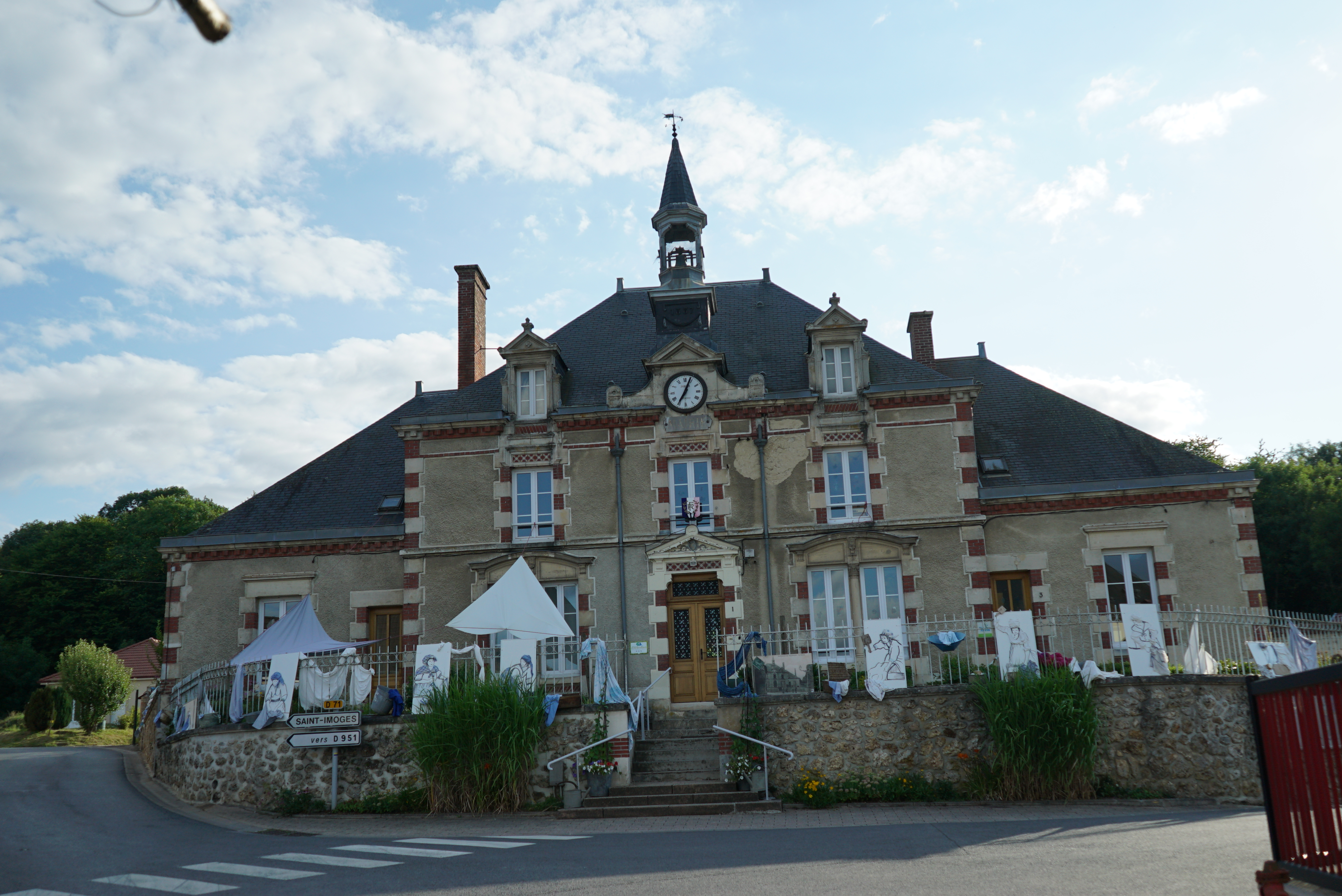
- The town hall in Germaine
- Location of Germaine
- Location within France Location within Grand Est
- Coordinates: 49°06′55″N 4°01′52″E
- Country: France
- Region: Grand Est
- Department: Marne
- Arrondissement: Épernay
- Canton: Épernay-1
- Intercommunality: Grande Vallée de la Marne

Government
  - Mayor (2020–2026): Philippe Caplat
- Area^{1}: 14.87 km^{2} (5.74 sq mi)
- Highest elevation: 274 m (899 ft)
- Lowest elevation: 123 m (404 ft)
- Population (2023): 528
  - Density: 35.5/km^{2} (92.0/sq mi)
- Time zone: UTC+01:00 (CET)
  - Summer (DST): UTC+02:00 (CEST)
- INSEE/Postal code: 51266 /51160
- ^{1} French Land Register data, which excludes lakes, ponds, glaciers > 1 km^{2} (0.386 sq mi or 247 acres) and river estuaries.

Germaine (French pronunciation: [ʒɛʁmɛn]) is a commune in the Marne department in north-eastern France.

== Wine production ==
Germaine is part of the Champagne wine region. Moët & Chandon have vineyards in Germaine. In 2008 it was proposed to redraw the region boundaries, excluding Germaine. As of 2019, the change had not happened, with a final decision expected in 2024.

== See also ==
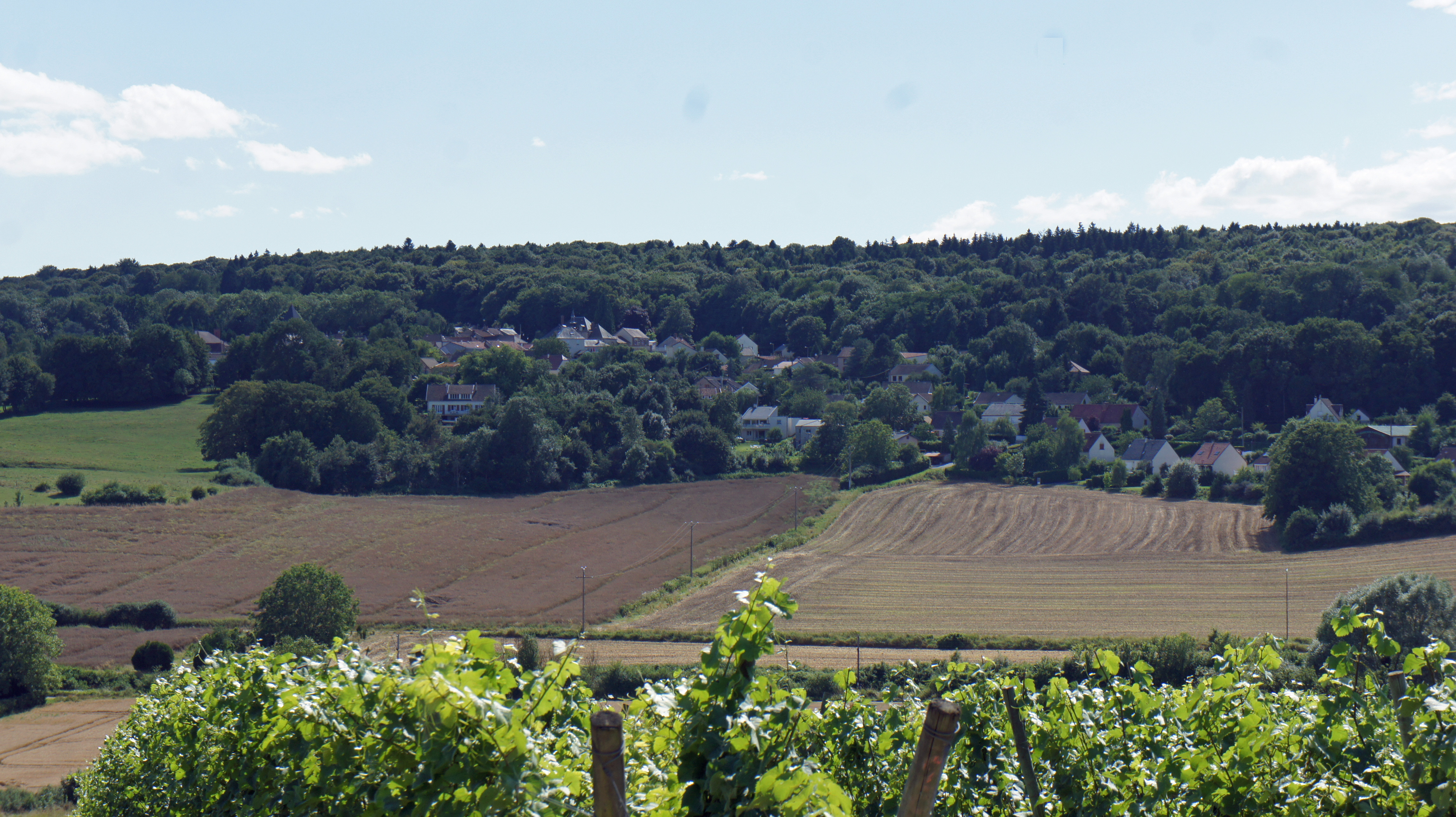

- Communes of the Marne department
- Montagne de Reims Regional Natural Park
