= Val de Livre =

- Commune
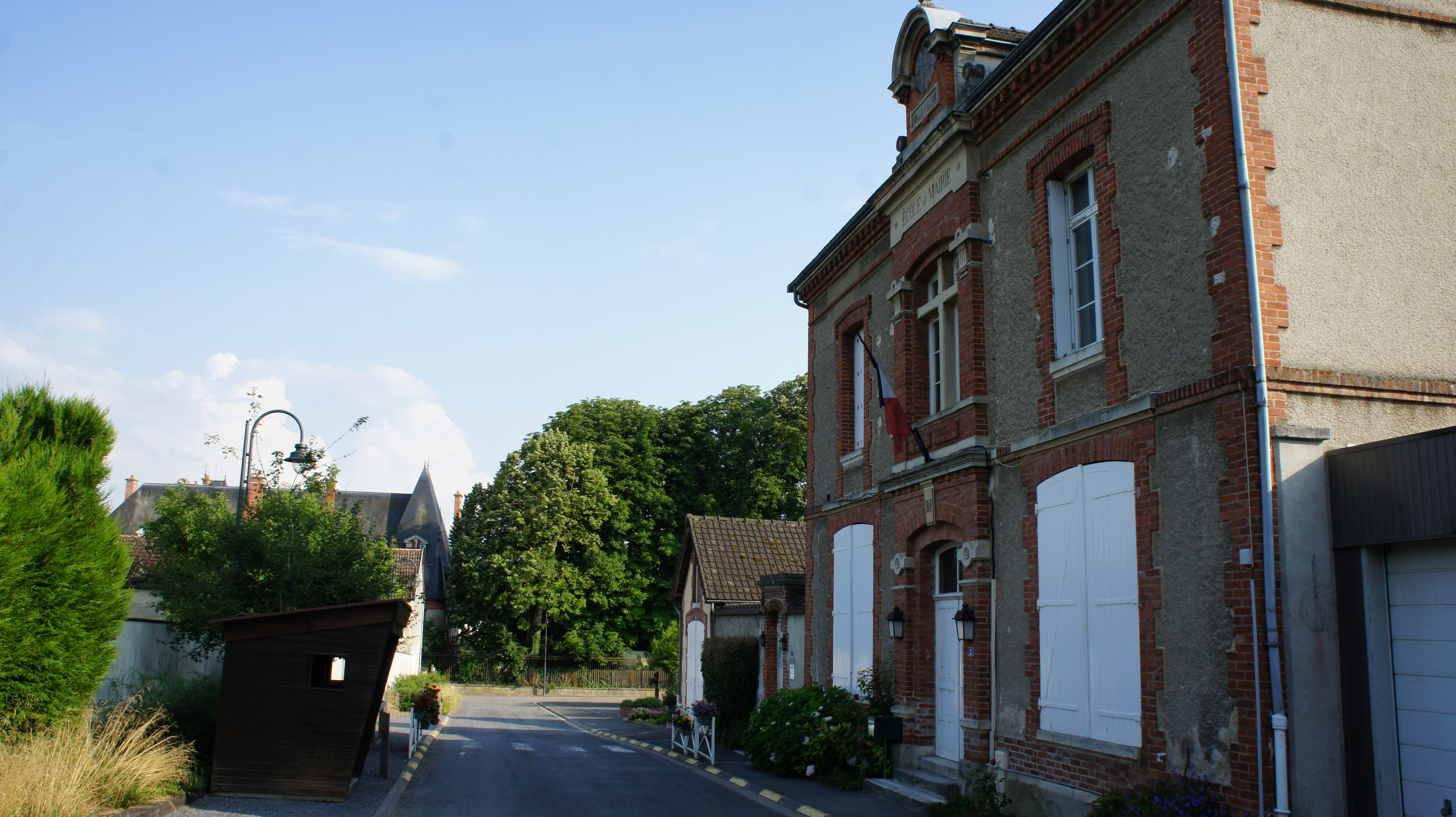
- The town hall in Val de Livre
- Location of Val de Livre
- Location within France Location within Grand Est
- Coordinates: 49°05′28″N 4°06′14″E
- Country: France
- Region: Grand Est
- Department: Marne
- Arrondissement: Épernay
- Canton: Épernay-1

Government
  - Mayor (2020–2026): Philippe Richomme
- Area^{1}: 22.34 km^{2} (8.63 sq mi)
- Population (2023): 586
  - Density: 26.2/km^{2} (67.9/sq mi)
- Time zone: UTC+01:00 (CET)
  - Summer (DST): UTC+02:00 (CEST)
- INSEE/Postal code: 51564 /51150
- ^{1} French Land Register data, which excludes lakes, ponds, glaciers > 1 km^{2} (0.386 sq mi or 247 acres) and river estuaries.

Val de Livre (French pronunciation: [val də livʁ]) is a commune in the Marne department, northern France. The municipality was established on 1 January 2016 and consists of the former communes of Tauxières-Mutry and Louvois.

== See also ==
- Communes of the Marne department
