= Tauxières-Mutry =

- Part of Val de Livre
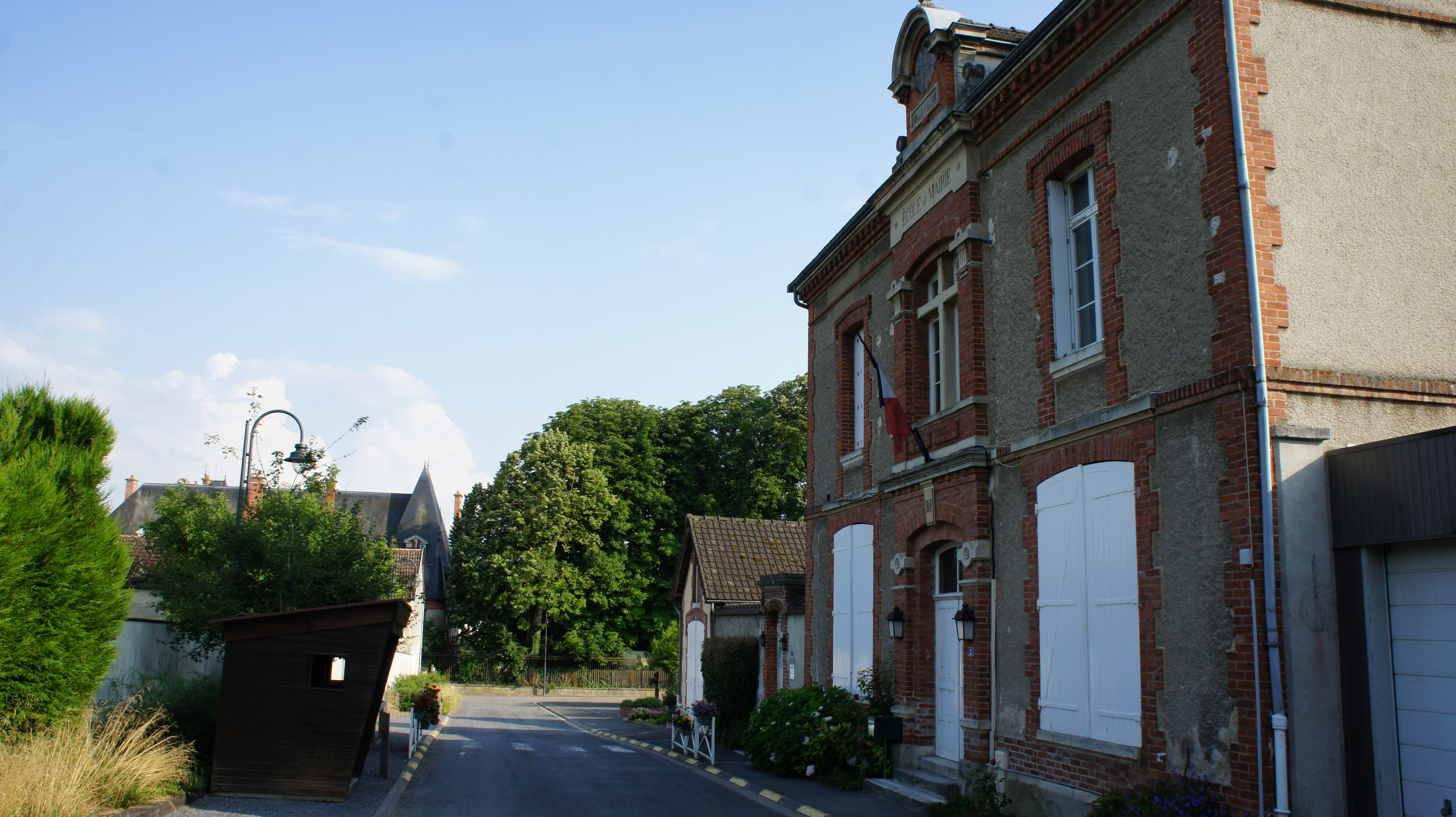
- Town hall
- Location of Tauxières-Mutry
- Location within France Location within Grand Est
- Coordinates: 49°05′31″N 4°06′16″E
- Country: France
- Region: Grand Est
- Department: Marne
- Arrondissement: Épernay
- Canton: Épernay-1
- Commune: Val de Livre
- Area^{1}: 10.17 km^{2} (3.93 sq mi)
- Elevation: 114 m (374 ft)
- Population (2022): 268
  - Density: 26.4/km^{2} (68.3/sq mi)
- Time zone: UTC+01:00 (CET)
  - Summer (DST): UTC+02:00 (CEST)
- Postal code: 51150
- ^{1} French Land Register data, which excludes lakes, ponds, glaciers > 1 km^{2} (0.386 sq mi or 247 acres) and river estuaries.

Tauxières-Mutry (French pronunciation: [toksjɛʁ mytʁi]) is a former commune in the Marne department in north-eastern France. On 1 January 2016, it was merged into the new commune Val de Livre.

== Champagne ==
Its vineyards are located in the Montagne de Reims subregion of Champagne, and are classified as Premier Cru (99%) in the Champagne vineyard classification. Together with Mareuil-sur-Ay it is the highest rated of the Premier Cru villages, and has therefore just missed out on Grand Cru (100%) status.

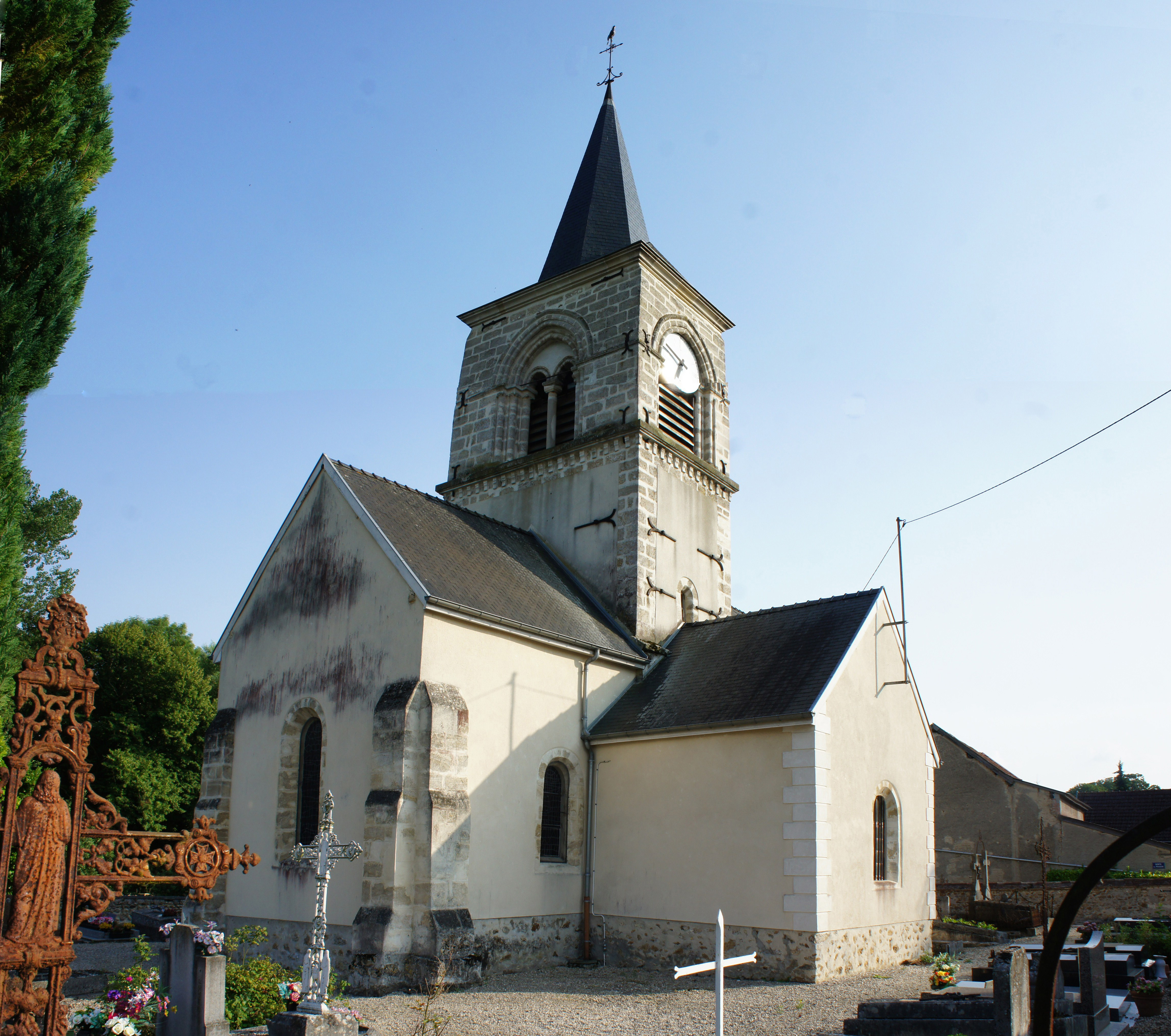
Church of Tauxières-Mutry.

== See also ==
- Communes of the Marne department
- Montagne de Reims Regional Natural Park
