= Mardeuil =

- Commune
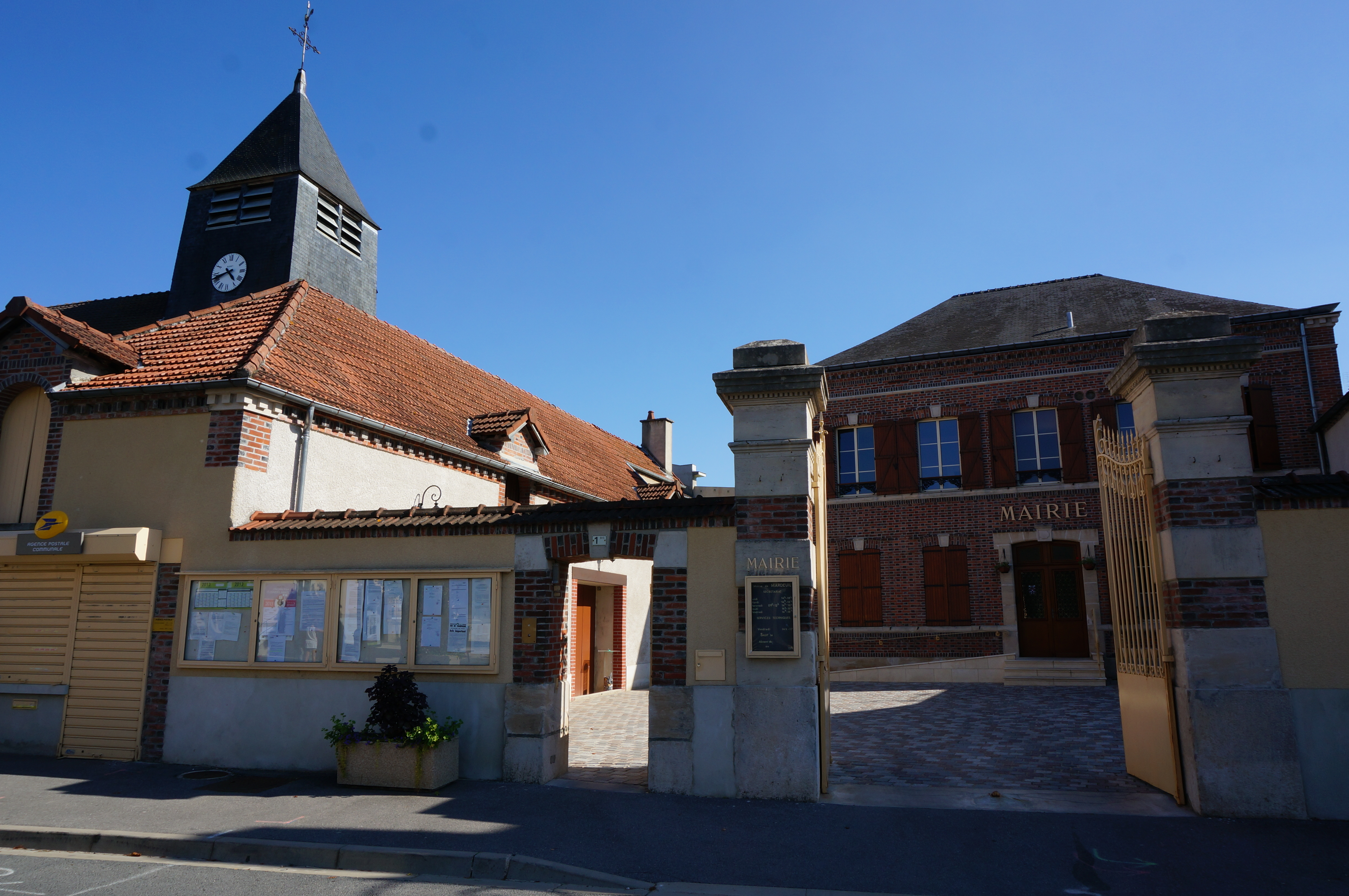
- The town hall, post office and church in Mardeuil

- Coat of arms
- Location of Mardeuil
- Location within France Location within Grand Est
- Coordinates: 49°03′18″N 3°55′50″E
- Country: France
- Region: Grand Est
- Department: Marne
- Arrondissement: Épernay
- Canton: Épernay-1
- Intercommunality: CA Épernay, Coteaux et Plaine de Champagne

Government
  - Mayor (2020–2026): Denis de Chillou de Churet
- Area^{1}: 9.19 km^{2} (3.55 sq mi)
- Population (2023): 1,457
  - Density: 159/km^{2} (411/sq mi)
- Demonym(s): Mardouillats, Mardouillates
- Time zone: UTC+01:00 (CET)
  - Summer (DST): UTC+02:00 (CEST)
- INSEE/Postal code: 51344 /51530
- Website: http://www.commune-de-mardeuil.com/
- ^{1} French Land Register data, which excludes lakes, ponds, glaciers > 1 km^{2} (0.386 sq mi or 247 acres) and river estuaries.

Mardeuil (French pronunciation: [maʁdœj]) is a commune in the Marne department in north-eastern France.

== See also ==
- Communes of the Marne department
