= Canard-Duchêne =

French champagne house

Coordinates: 49.1535235°N 4.081112°E

- Founded: 1868
- Founders: Victor Canard and Léonie Duchêne
- Headquarters: 1 Rue Edmond Canard, 51500 Ludes, Champagne, France
- Parent: Thiénot Group
- Website: canard-duchene.fr

Canard-Duchêne is a Champagne house founded in 1868 and currently part of the Thiénot group, owner of its own label Champagne Thiénot, plus Joseph Perrier and Marie Stuart.

The House was founded by Victor Canard and Léonie Duchêne, who gave their names to the champagne house.

== History ==
Canard-Duchêne was founded in 1868 by husband-and-wife Victor Canard and Léonie Duchêne. The two had met in 1860, Victor a barrel-maker with knowledge of farming and ageing wines in barrels, while Duchêne was knowledgeable wine-tasting and viniculture. In 1890, Victor and Léonie's son Edmond secured a contract with Tsar Nicholas II of Russia to be his official supplier of Champagne. After this, Canard-Duchêne adopted the Russian Imperial coat of arms as part of its logo, the two-headed eagle.

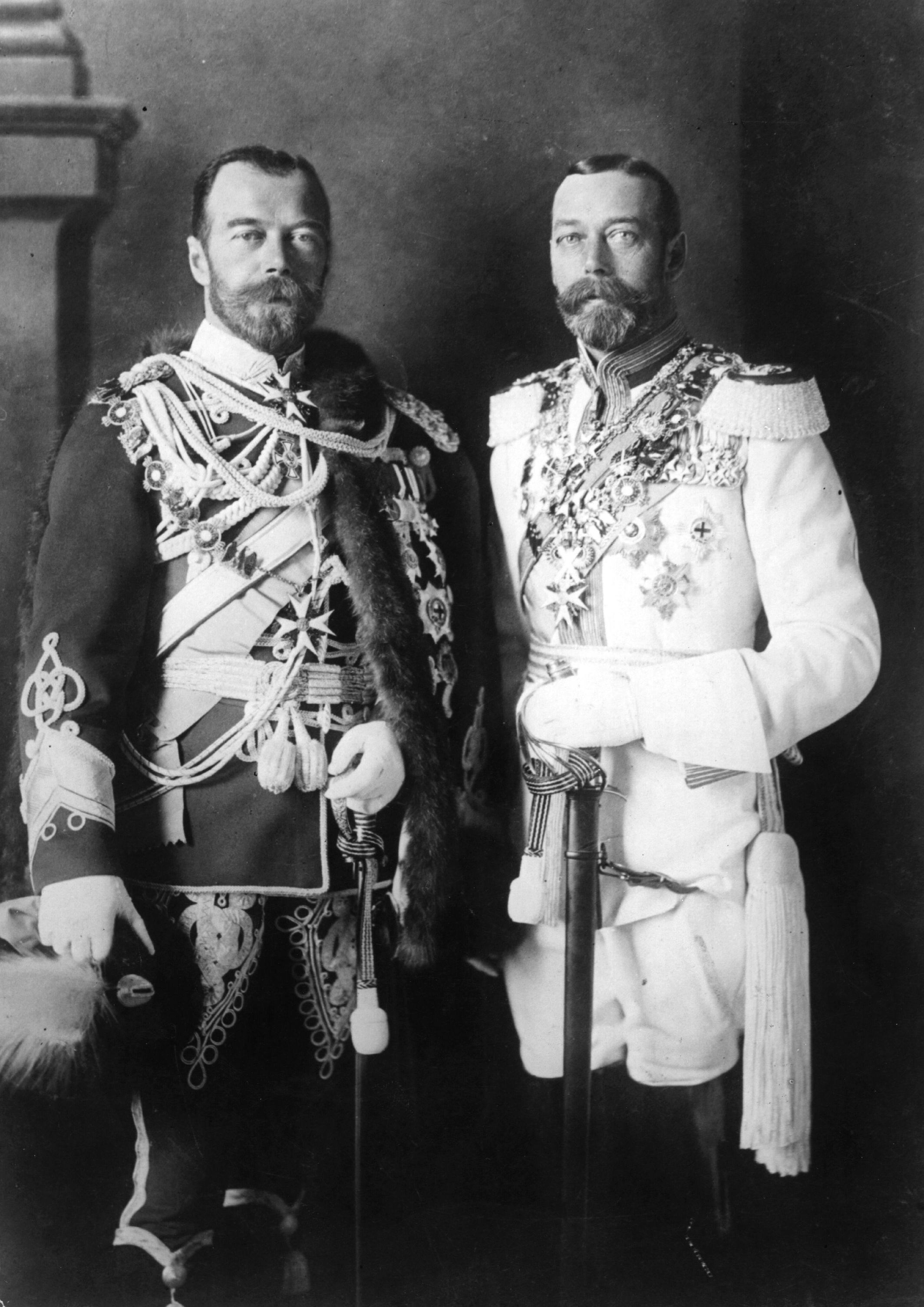
Photo of Tsar Nicholas II and King George V in Berlin, 1913

In 1978, Canard-Duchêne was associated with Veuve Clicquot and then joined the LVMH Group. Subsequently, the House saw substantial growth on European markets. The takeover by the independent Champagne group Thiénot occurred in October 2003.

== Champagnes ==
=== Canard-Duchêne Brut Non-Vintage Champagne ===
The Authentic Brut Non-Vintage tastes both fresh and intense. It is made from a blend of 60 different Cru wines, and the blend of grapes is made up of 45% Pinot Noir, 35% Pinot Meunier and 20% Chardonnay. Reserve wines from several years make up at least 20% of the blend in order to give a consistent style year after year.

Canard-Duchêne Authentic Brut is characterised by its straw-yellow appearance and delicate mousse. Intense aromas of fresh fruit can be detected, typical of the Pinot grape varietals. On the palate, fruit aromas intermingle with pastry notes. The Canard-Duchêne Authentic Brut is often drunk with light foods, and particularly as an aperitif.

=== Canard-Duchêne Brut Non-Vintage Rosé Champagne ===
Canard-Duchêne Authentic Rosé is a blend of 50% Pinot noir, 20% Pinot Meunier and 30% Chardonnay. The reserve wines, particularly red wines crafted from Pinot Noir from the Montagne de Reims, make up at least 10% of the blend in order to give a consistent style year after year.

=== Grande Cuvée Charles VII NV Champagne ===
Charles VII was launched in 1968 to celebrate the 100th anniversary of Canard-Duchêne. Grande Cuvée Charles VII is made through a selection of what the producer views as the best crus, producing a fruity drink.

== Environment ==
Canard-Duchêne is unusual for a major Champagne houses in being situated in the countryside rather than a town. In marketing, the business emphasises organic farming practices.

== Awards ==
Canard-Duchêne wines consistently obtain awards across the board for the Champagnes they produce. Below is a summary of the awards some of their Champagnes won in 2012:

Canard-Duchêne Brut Non-Vintage Champagne

- 'Bronze' in the Decanter World Wine Awards
- 'Silver' in the International Wine & Spirit Competition
- 'Bronze' in the International Wine Challenge
- Given 14/20 by Jancis Robinson.

Canard-Duchêne Authentic Green Brut Non-Vintage

- 'Commended' at the Decanter World Wine Awards
- 'Silver' in the International Wine & Spirit Competition
- 'Silver' in the International Wine Challenge

Canard-Duchêne Brut Non-Vintage Rosé Champagne

- 'Bronze' in the Japan Wine Challenge
- 'Commended' by the International Wine Challenge
- 'Bronze' in the International Wine and Spirit Competition

Grande Cuvée Charles VII NV Champagne

- 'Silver' in the Decanter World Wine Awards
- 'Bronze' in the International Wine Challenge
- 'Seal of Approval' at the Japan Wine Challenge
- Given 17/20 by Jancis Robinson

== See also ==
- List of Champagne houses
