= Michel Pébereau =

French businessman (born 1942)

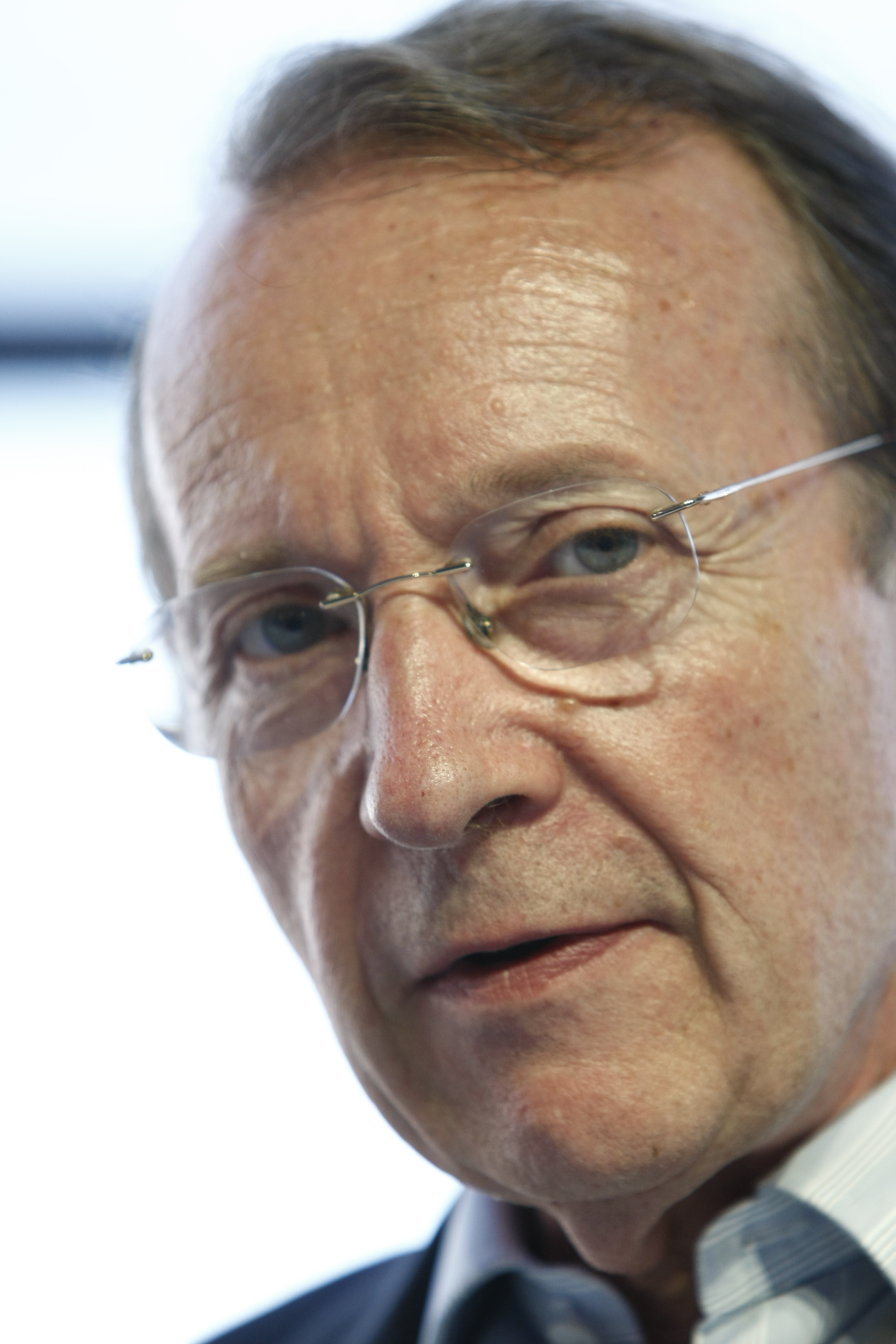
- Born: 23 January 1942 (age 83); Paris, France
- Education: Lycée Louis-le-Grand
- Alma mater: École Polytechnique, ÉNA
- Occupation: Chair of bnp paribas

Michel Pébereau (born 23 January 1942) is a French businessman and former chairman of BNP Paribas. He became chair after overseeing the merger of Banque Nationale de Paris and Banque Paribas in May 2000. He retired in 2011.

== Early life and education ==
He graduated from the École Polytechnique in 1965 and the École nationale d'administration in 1967.

== Career ==
Pébereau began his business career in 1967 at the Inspection générale des finances. Three years later he joined the French Treasury and held a variety of high-ranking positions. He led Banque Nationale de Paris for seven years leading up to its merger with Banque Paribas.

He is a member of the board of directors for various organizations internationally.
