= Jehan de Louvois =

Jehan de Louvois in the Chansonnier du Roi, above his song

Jehan de Louvois (fl. 1252–1270) was a French nobleman and trouvère from the County of Champagne.

== Life ==
Jehan was born perhaps as early as the 1210s. His family were vassals of the House of Châtillon for a part of Louvois. His grandfather, Vauthier, and father, Oudart, were co-ruling their part of Louvois in 1225, when they renounced their half of the viscountcy of Mailly in exchange for the right to build a banal oven. Nonetheless, Jehan continued to be known by the vicecomital title, perhaps because it had become attached to their fief in Louvois by then. He had a younger brother named Robert, attested in 1254.

Jehan succeeded his father sometime between 1225 and 1252. He is recorded as a vassal of Count Theobald IV of Champagne between 1249 and 1252. He held as fiefs of the count the fortress and village of Dugny and the forests of La Neuville-en-Chaillois, Saint-Basle and Vauremont. He also appears in a list of vassals of Count Theobald V (1256–1270).

Jehan married a daughter of Stephen, lord of Mareuil-sur-Ay, as attested in a document from the reign of Theobald V. In 1270, he made a donation to the abbey of Avenay, where he was to be buried, for perpetual masses for his soul. He was by then an old man. The next known lord of Louvois, Bernard (fl. 1286–1295), was possibly his son.

== Poetry ==
Only one surviving song, Chanz ne me vient de verdure, is attributed to Jehan de Louvois. It is preserved in four chansonniers, but in three of these (sigla I, O and U) it is anonymous. Jehan is named as its author only in the Chansonnier du Roi, where he is also depicted as a charging knight in a decorated initial. The first stanza is:

Chanz ne me vient de verdure
Ne por yver ne remaint;
Chanter puis je par froidure,
Se la saison m'i ataint.
Mais ce ne soude ne fraint,
Qu'a cler jor m'est nuis oscure
Puis que joie me soufraint;
Moi ne chaut queus vans me maint
