= Louvois, Marne =

Louvois
- Part of Val de Livre
- Location of Louvois
- Location within France Location within Grand Est
- Coordinates: 49°06′06″N 4°07′00″E
- Country: France
- Region: Grand Est
- Department: Marne
- Arrondissement: Épernay
- Canton: Épernay-1
- Commune: Val de Livre
- Area^{1}: 12.17 km^{2} (4.70 sq mi)
- Highest elevation: 281 m (922 ft)
- Lowest elevation: 109 m (358 ft)
- Population (2022): 323
  - Density: 26.5/km^{2} (68.7/sq mi)
- Time zone: UTC+01:00 (CET)
  - Summer (DST): UTC+02:00 (CEST)
- Postal code: 51150
- ^{1} French Land Register data, which excludes lakes, ponds, glaciers > 1 km^{2} (0.386 sq mi or 247 acres) and river estuaries.

Louvois (French pronunciation: [luvwa]) is a former commune in the Marne department in north-eastern France. On 1 January 2016, it was merged into the new commune Val de Livre.

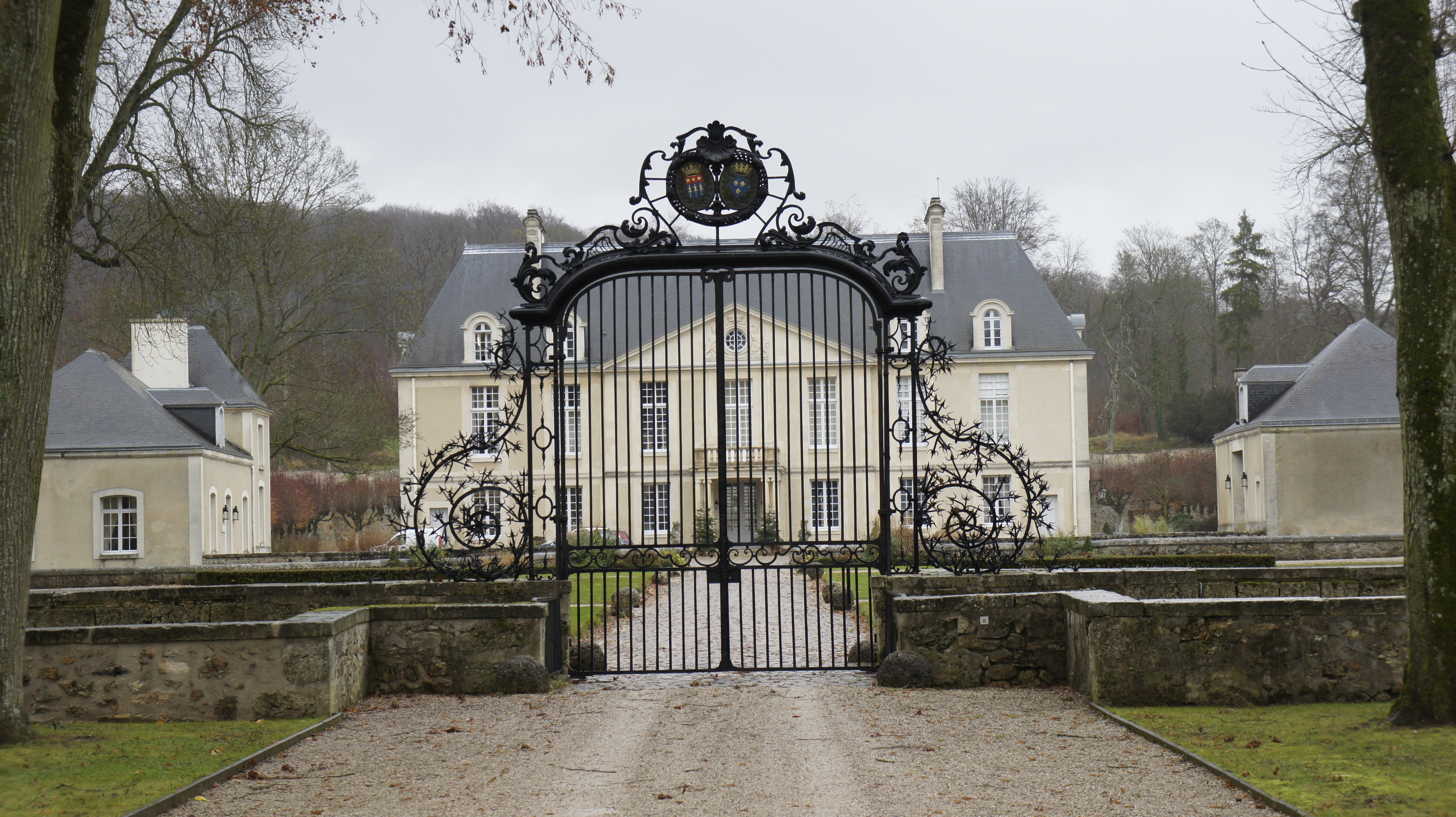
Castle and baroque gardens.

The trouvère Jehan de Louvois was lord of the place in the 13th century.

== Champagne ==
The village's vineyards are located in the Montagne de Reims subregion of Champagne, and are classified as Grand Cru (100%) in the Champagne vineyard classification.

== See also ==
- Communes of the Marne department
- Classification of Champagne vineyards
- Montagne de Reims Regional Natural Park
- François-Michel le Tellier, Marquis de Louvois
