= Mutigny =

- Commune
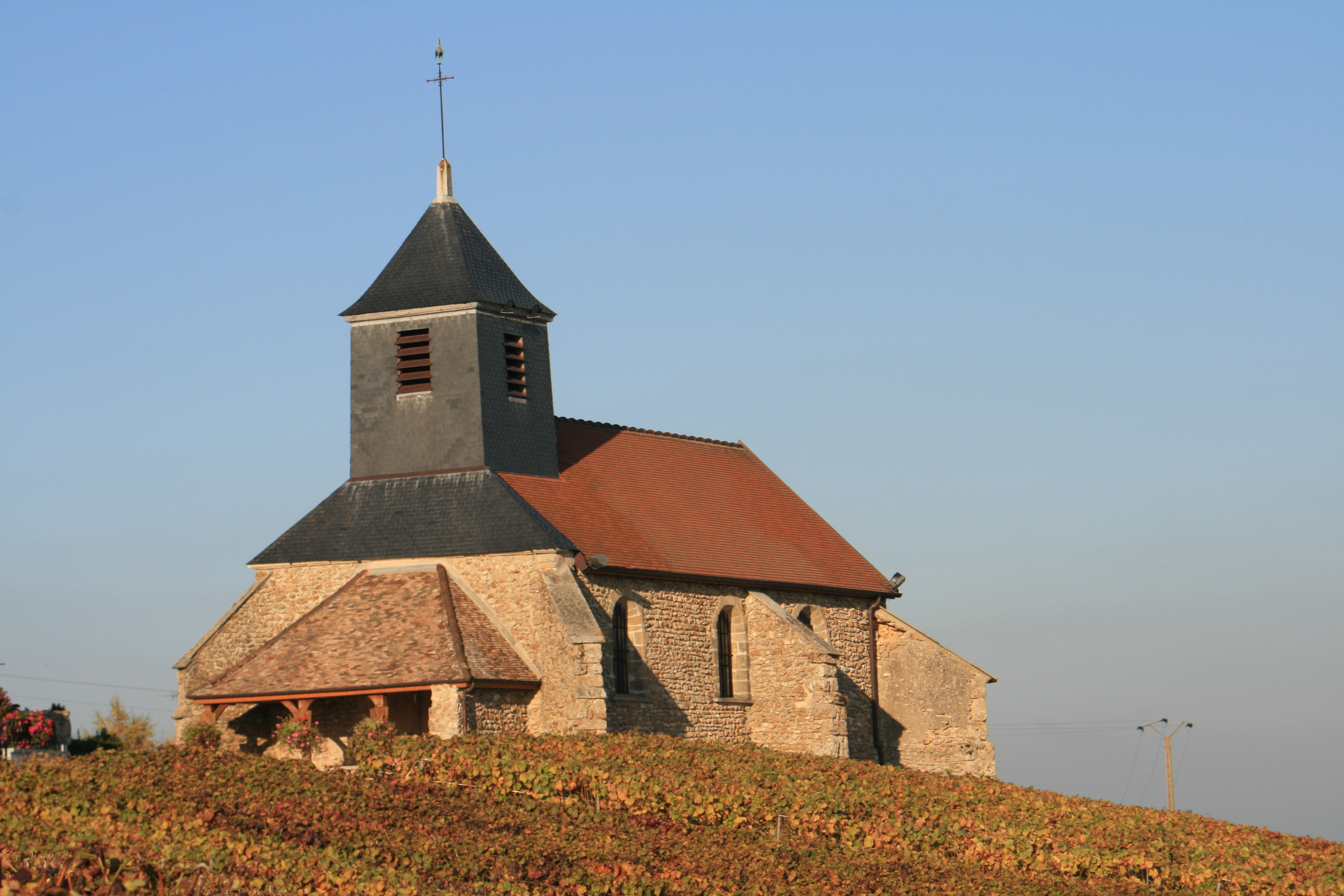
- The church in Mutigny
- Location of Mutigny
- Location within France Location within Grand Est
- Coordinates: 49°04′02″N 4°01′37″E
- Country: France
- Region: Grand Est
- Department: Marne
- Arrondissement: Épernay
- Canton: Épernay-1
- Intercommunality: Grande Vallée de la Marne

Government
  - Mayor (2020–2026): Marie-Claude Remy
- Area^{1}: 3.75 km^{2} (1.45 sq mi)
- Elevation: 240 m (790 ft)
- Population (2023): 212
  - Density: 56.5/km^{2} (146/sq mi)
- Time zone: UTC+01:00 (CET)
  - Summer (DST): UTC+02:00 (CEST)
- INSEE/Postal code: 51392 /51160
- ^{1} French Land Register data, which excludes lakes, ponds, glaciers > 1 km^{2} (0.386 sq mi or 247 acres) and river estuaries.

Mutigny (French pronunciation: [mytiɲi]) is a commune in the Marne department in north-eastern France.

== See also ==
- Communes of the Marne department
- Montagne de Reims Regional Natural Park
