= Avenay-Val-d'Or =

- Commune
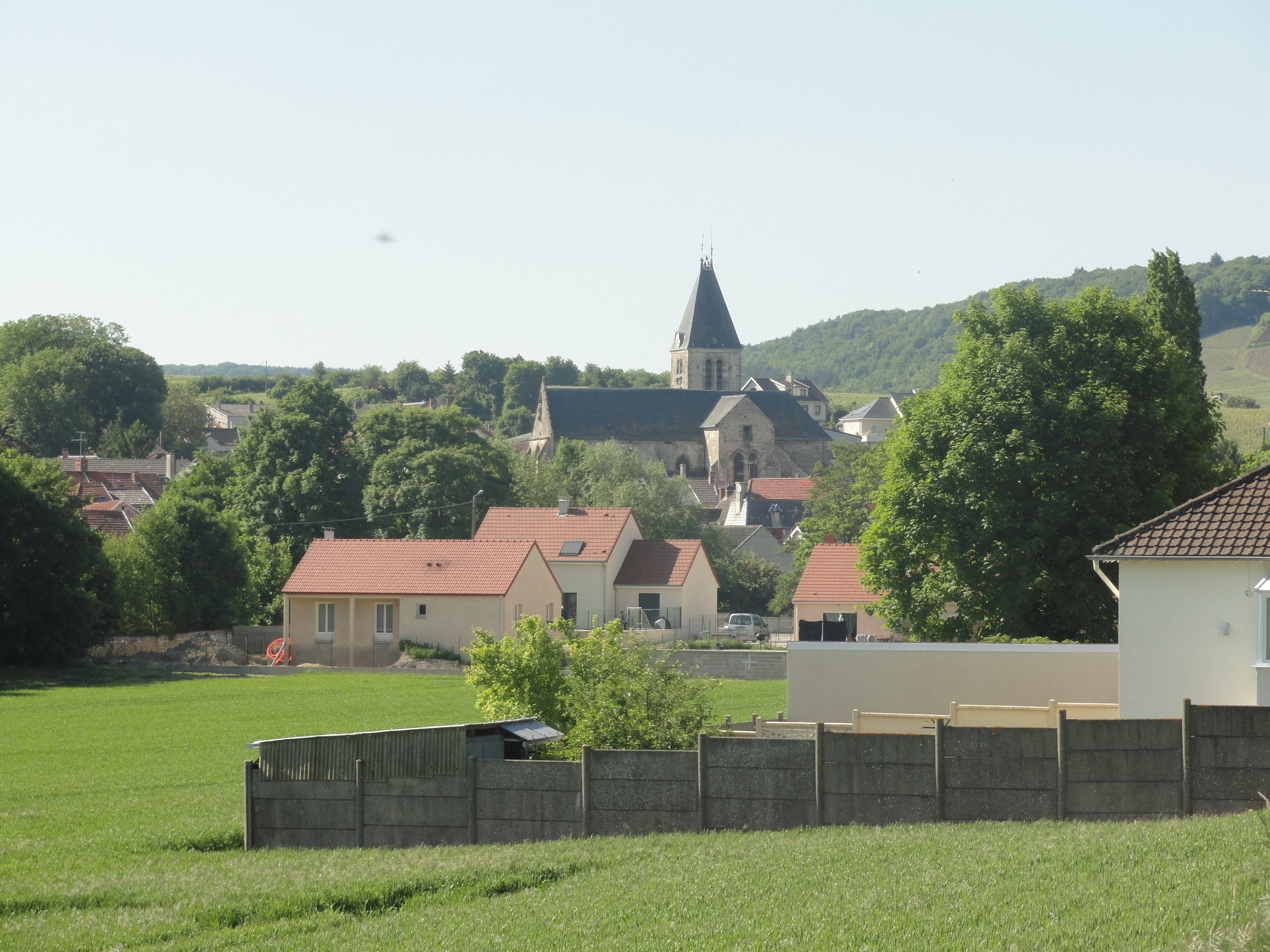
- A general view of Avenay-Val-d'Or
- Location of Avenay-Val-d'Or
- Location within France Location within Grand Est
- Coordinates: 49°04′12″N 4°02′48″E
- Country: France
- Region: Grand Est
- Department: Marne
- Arrondissement: Épernay
- Canton: Épernay-1
- Intercommunality: CC Grande Vallée Marne

Government
  - Mayor (2020–2026): Philippe Maussire
- Area^{1}: 12.49 km^{2} (4.82 sq mi)
- Highest elevation: 256 m (840 ft)
- Lowest elevation: 73 m (240 ft)
- Population (2023): 956
  - Density: 76.5/km^{2} (198/sq mi)
- Time zone: UTC+01:00 (CET)
  - Summer (DST): UTC+02:00 (CEST)
- INSEE/Postal code: 51028 /51160
- ^{1} French Land Register data, which excludes lakes, ponds, glaciers > 1 km^{2} (0.386 sq mi or 247 acres) and river estuaries.

Avenay-Val-d'Or (French pronunciation: [avnɛ val dɔʁ]) is a commune in the Marne department, northeastern France. Located in the Vallée de la Marne, part of the Champagne region, its primary industry is viticulture.

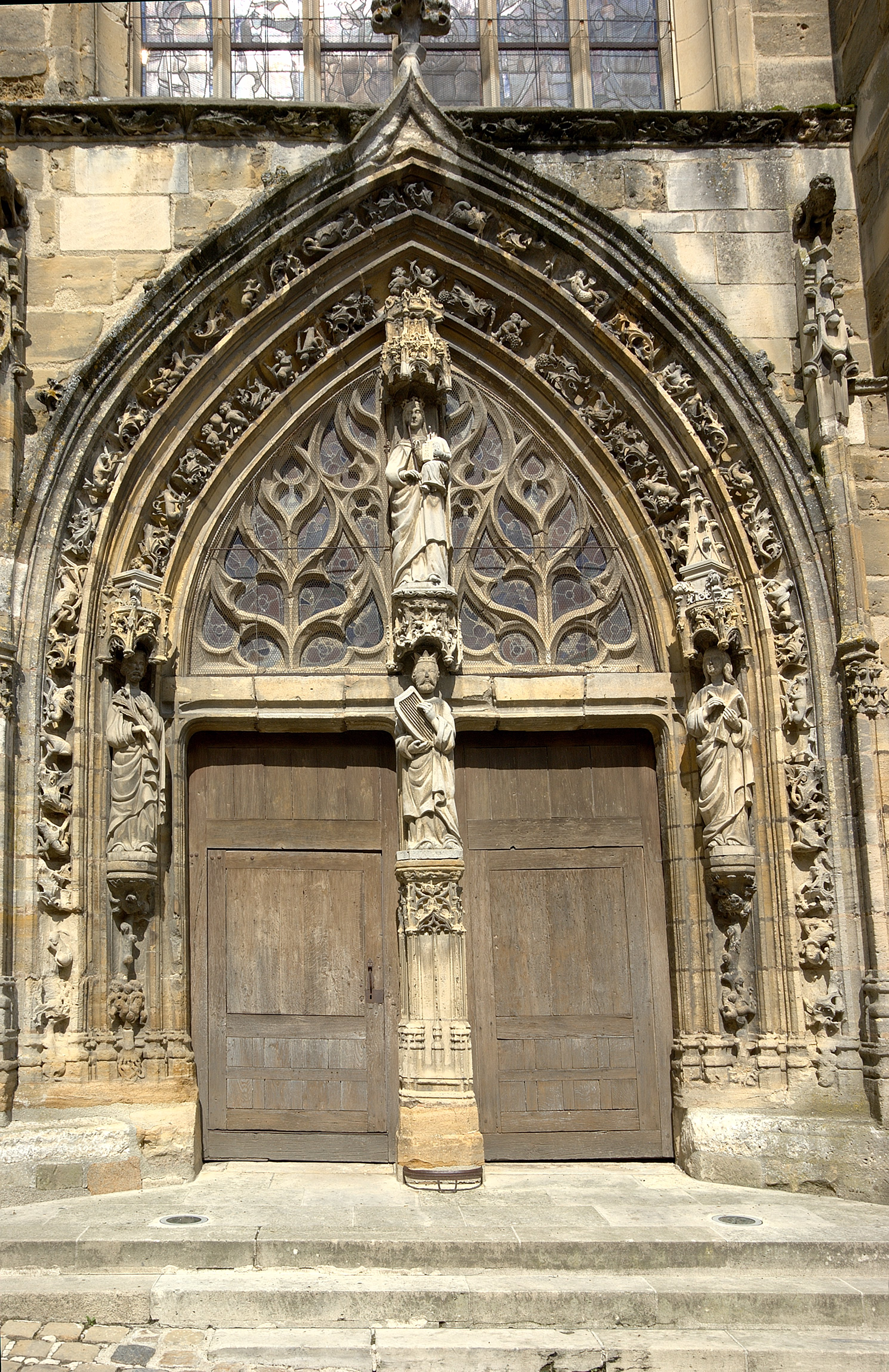
Portal of Saint Trésain's church

== History ==
A number of Roman remains have been discovered nearby, including a fort and medals showing Emperors Marcus Aurelius and his son Commodus. It was formerly the site of a Benedictine abbey founded by Bertha of Avenay at the end of the sixth century CE, later destroyed during the French Revolution. One of the most prestigious religious institutions in Champagne, it became so popular in the 12th century that limits were placed on the number of nuns accepted.

== Population ==
Historical population
Year	Pop.	±% p.a.
1968	1,009	—
1975	1,040	+0.43%
1982	953	−1.24%
1990	991	+0.49%
1999	1,026	+0.39%
2007	901	−1.61%
2012	910	+0.20%
2017	1,026	+2.43%
2023	956	−1.17%
Source: INSEE

== See also ==
- Communes of the Marne department
- Montagne de Reims Regional Natural Park
