= Champillon =

- Commune
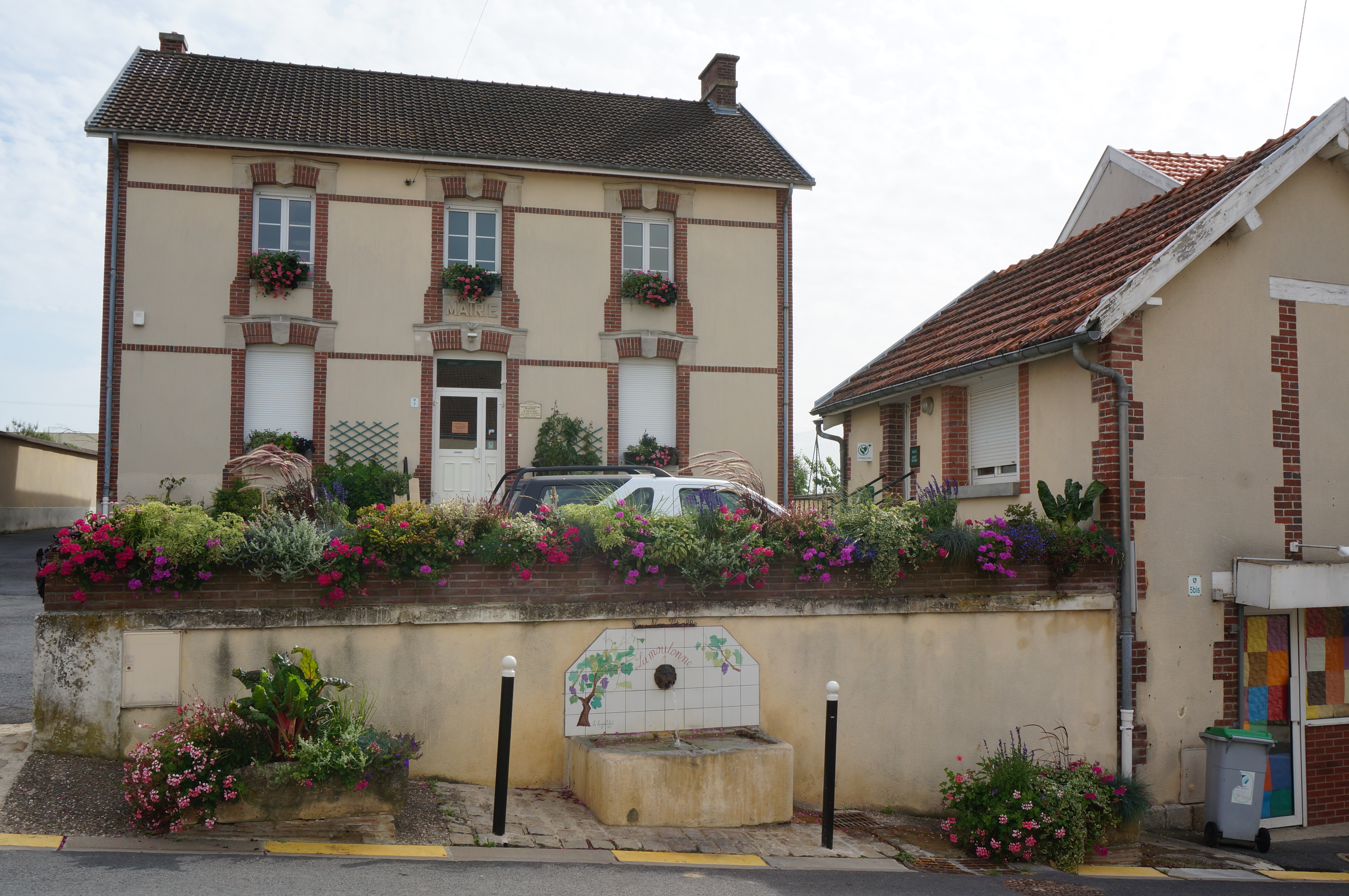
- The town hall in Champillon

- Coat of arms
- Location of Champillon
- Location within France Location within Grand Est
- Coordinates: 49°05′07″N 3°58′44″E
- Country: France
- Region: Grand Est
- Department: Marne
- Arrondissement: Épernay
- Canton: Épernay-1
- Intercommunality: Grande Vallée de la Marne

Government
  - Mayor (2020–2026): Jean-Marc Beguin
- Area^{1}: 1.46 km^{2} (0.56 sq mi)
- Elevation: 198 m (650 ft)
- Population (2023): 510
  - Density: 350/km^{2} (900/sq mi)
- Time zone: UTC+01:00 (CET)
  - Summer (DST): UTC+02:00 (CEST)
- INSEE/Postal code: 51119 /51160
- ^{1} French Land Register data, which excludes lakes, ponds, glaciers > 1 km^{2} (0.386 sq mi or 247 acres) and river estuaries.

Champillon (French pronunciation: [ʃɑ̃pijɔ̃]) is a commune in the Marne department in north-eastern France.

== See also ==
- Communes of the Marne department
- Montagne de Reims Regional Natural Park
