= Jacques Calvet =

French businessman (1931–2020)

- Born: 19 September 1931; Boulogne-Billancourt, France
- Died: 9 April 2020 (aged 88); Dieppe, France
- Occupation: Businessman

Jacques Calvet (19 September 1931 – 9 April 2020) was a French businessman.

== Biography ==
Calvet earned a degree from Sciences Po after attending the school from 1955 to 1957. He studied alongside Édouard Balladur. He joined the Court of Audit in 1957. From 1959 to 1974, he served in various ministerial offices in the cabinet of Valéry Giscard d'Estaing. He was nicknamed "Deputy Minister" for his various roles.[1] After d'Estaing's victory in the 1974 French presidential election, he joined the Banque nationale de Paris, which was owned by the state at the time. He became managing director in 1976 and succeeded Pierre Ladoux as chairman in 1979. François Mitterrand's victory in the 1981 French presidential election caused Calvet's departure from the bank the following year.

Peugeot called on Calvet in 1982 when Groupe PSA was experiencing financial difficulties. CEO of the group from 1984 to 1997, he restructured the Peugeot and Citroën brands and helped them become leading auto manufacturers in Europe. When he began leading Groupe PSA, the company was 30.5 billion francs in debt. When he left in 1997, the group had 17.6 billion francs in equity. In 1987, President Mitterrand described Calvet as his "most dangerous adversary". He participated in the political show L'Heure du vérité on 3 October 1988. In 1989, Calvet sued the newspaper Le Canard enchaîné for publishing his tax return sheet, which indicated a strong increase in revenues. The European Court of Human Rights condemned France for its lack of ability to maintain freedom of the press. He strongly defended the French automobile industry against that of Japan, waging war against the "technocrats of Europe". He took part in the Maastricht Treaty in 1992. He was succeeded at Groupe PSA by Jean-Martin Folz.

During the 1997 French legislative election, Calvet ran for the Rally for the Republic party nomination in Haute-de-Seine's 5th constituency, but failed to gather support. He then worked in several advisory positions in various large French companies, such as Société Générale and Galeries Lafayette. In 1999, he was godfather to the graduating class of the Economic Warfare School.

Jacques Calvet died on 9 April 2020 at the age of 88 in Dieppe.
