= Magenta, Marne =

Magenta
- Commune
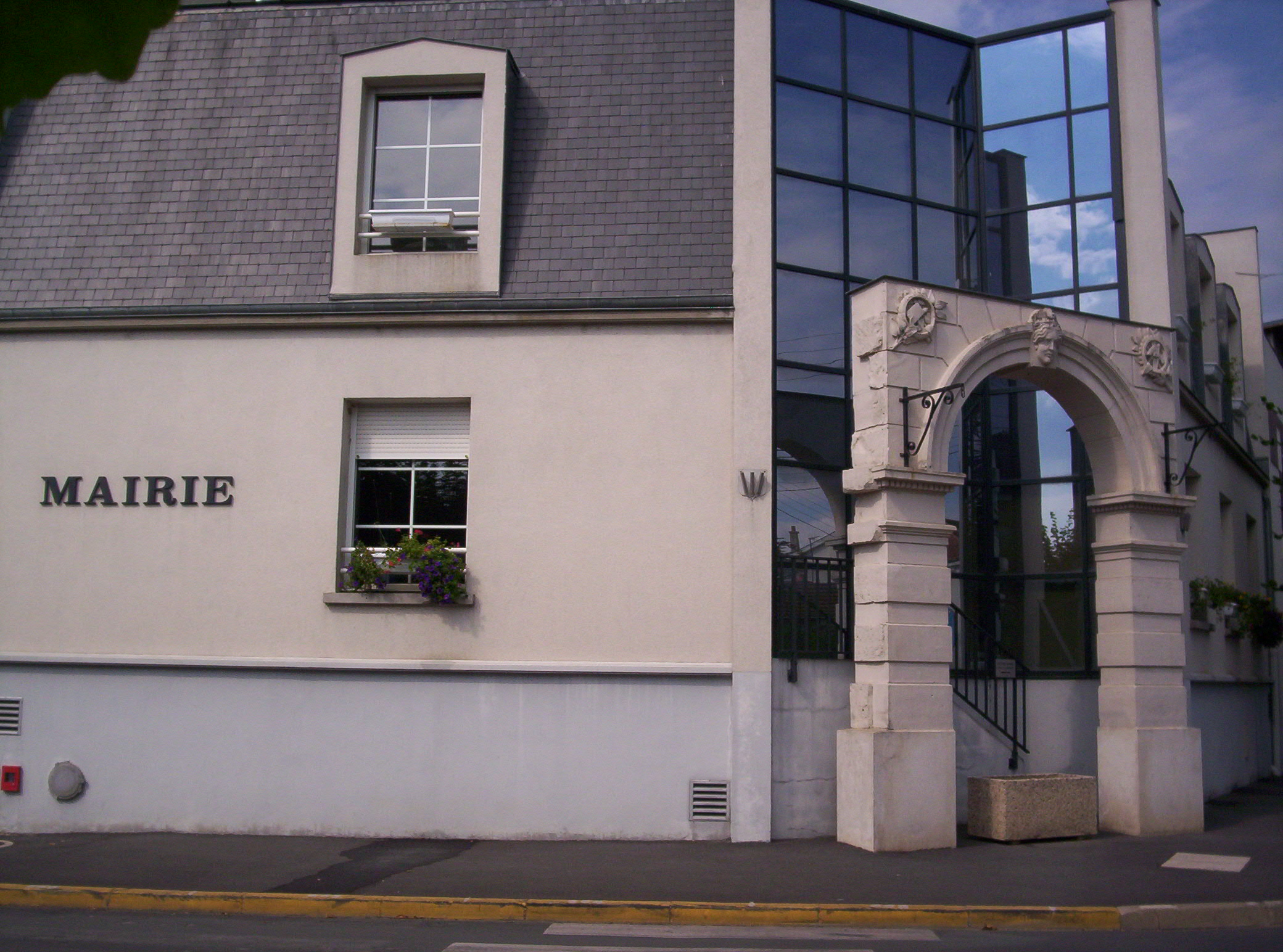
- The town hall in Magenta

- Coat of arms
- Location of Magenta
- Location within France Location within Grand Est
- Coordinates: 49°03′10″N 3°57′58″E
- Country: France
- Region: Grand Est
- Department: Marne
- Arrondissement: Épernay
- Canton: Épernay-1
- Intercommunality: CA Épernay, Coteaux et Plaine de Champagne

Government
  - Mayor (2020–2026): Laurent Madeline
- Area^{1}: 0.97 km^{2} (0.37 sq mi)
- Elevation: 72 m (236 ft)
- Population (2023): 1,680
  - Density: 1,700/km^{2} (4,500/sq mi)
- Demonym(s): Magentais, Magentaises
- Time zone: UTC+01:00 (CET)
  - Summer (DST): UTC+02:00 (CEST)
- INSEE/Postal code: 51663 /51530
- Website: www.ville-magenta.fr
- ^{1} French Land Register data, which excludes lakes, ponds, glaciers > 1 km^{2} (0.386 sq mi or 247 acres) and river estuaries.

Magenta (French pronunciation: [maʒɛ̃ta]) is a commune in the Marne department in north-eastern France. It was named after the 1859 Battle of Magenta, now in Italy. As of 2023, the population of the commune was 1,680.

== See also ==
- Communes of the Marne department
