= Cumières =

- Commune
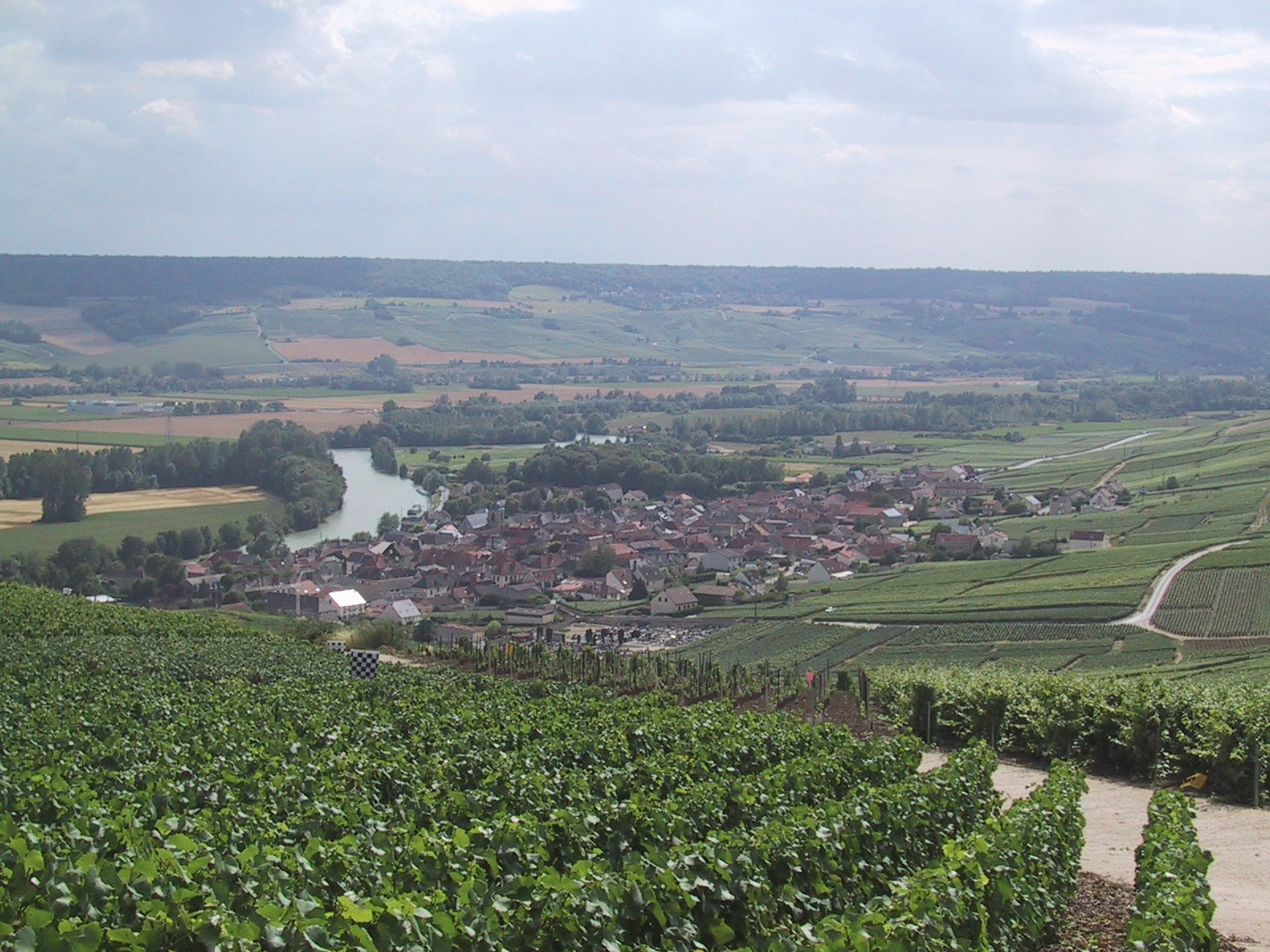
- A general view of Cumières

- Coat of arms
- Location of Cumières
- Location within France Location within Grand Est
- Coordinates: 49°04′22″N 3°55′39″E
- Country: France
- Region: Grand Est
- Department: Marne
- Arrondissement: Épernay
- Canton: Épernay-1
- Intercommunality: CA Épernay, Coteaux et Plaine de Champagne

Government
  - Mayor (2020–2026): José Tranchant
- Area^{1}: 2.99 km^{2} (1.15 sq mi)
- Elevation: 75 m (246 ft)
- Population (2023): 685
  - Density: 229/km^{2} (593/sq mi)
- Time zone: UTC+01:00 (CET)
  - Summer (DST): UTC+02:00 (CEST)
- INSEE/Postal code: 51202 /51480
- ^{1} French Land Register data, which excludes lakes, ponds, glaciers > 1 km^{2} (0.386 sq mi or 247 acres) and river estuaries.

Cumières (French pronunciation: [kymjɛʁ]) is a commune in the Marne department in north-eastern France.

== Twin towns ==
Cumières is twinned with:

- Felino, Italy
- Assesse, Belgium

== See also ==
- Communes of the Marne department
- Montagne de Reims Regional Natural Park
