= Lily Bollinger =

French wine executive (1899–1977)

Lily Bollinger (born Élisabeth Law de Lauriston-Boubers; 1899 - 22 February 1977 near Reims, France) was the head of the Bollinger Champagne business from 1941 to 1971.

Bollinger was the daughter of Baron Olivier Law de Lauriston-Boubers and Berthe de Marsay. She married Jacques Bollinger (1894-1941), general manager of Bollinger Champagne and grandson of founder Jacques Joseph Bollinger, on 10 November 1923. They had no children.

Bollinger took over the presidency of the Bollinger house after the death of her husband in 1941, and directed it until 1971. She launched the Bollinger RD vintage in 1961 and the vintage Vieilles Vignes Françaises in 1969, putting the brand on the international stage. After her death in 1977, her nephews, Claude d'Hautefeuille and Christian Bizot, succeeded her in turn.

Bollinger's most famous quote was

"I drink champagne when I'm happy and when I'm sad. Sometimes I drink it when I'm alone. When I have company I consider it obligatory. I trifle with it if I'm not hungry and drink it when I am. Otherwise, I never touch it—unless I'm thirsty."
