= Canton of Épernay-1 =

Coordinates: 49.05°N 3.95°E

The canton of Épernay-1 is an administrative division of the Marne department, northeastern France. Its borders were modified at the French canton reorganisation which came into effect in March 2015. Its seat is in Épernay.

It consists of the following communes:

1. Ambonnay
2. Avenay-Val-d'Or
3. Aÿ-Champagne
4. Bouzy
5. Champillon
6. Cumières
7. Dizy
8. Épernay (partly)
9. Fontaine-sur-Ay
10. Germaine
11. Hautvillers
12. Magenta
13. Mardeuil
14. Mutigny
15. Nanteuil-la-Forêt
16. Saint-Imoges
17. Tours-sur-Marne
18. Val-de-Livre
