= List of companies of Rwanda =

Location of Rwanda

Rwanda is a sovereign state in East Africa and one of the smallest countries on the African mainland. Its economy suffered heavily during the 1994 Rwandan Genocide, but has since strengthened. The economy is based mostly on subsistence agriculture. Coffee and tea are the major cash crops for export. Tourism is a fast-growing sector and is now the country's leading foreign exchange earner.

== Notable firms ==
This list includes notable companies with primary headquarters located in the country. The industry and sector follow the Industry Classification Benchmark taxonomy. Organizations which have ceased operations are included and noted as defunct.

Notable companies Status: P=Private, S=State; A=Active, D=Defunct
Name	Industry	Sector	Headquarters	Founded	Notes	Status	
AB Bank Rwanda	Financials	Banks	Kigali	2013	Microfinance bank	P	A
Access Bank Rwanda	Financials	Banks	Kigali	1995	Commercial bank	P	A
Bank of Africa Rwanda Limited	Financials	Banks	Kigali	2003	Commercial bank, part of Bank of Africa Group (Mali)	P	A
Bank of Kigali	Financials	Banks	Kigali	1966	Commercial bank	P	A
Banque Populaire du Rwanda	Financials	Banks	Kigali	1986	Commercial bank	P	A
Banque Populaire du Rwanda SA	Financials	Banks	Kigali	1975	Commercial bank	P	A
Bourbon Coffee	Consumer services	Restaurants & bars	Kigali	2006	Coffeehouse chain	P	A
Bralirwa Brewery	Consumer goods	Brewers	Kigali	1957	Brewery	P	A
Compagnie Générale de Banque	Financials	Banks	Kigali	1999	Commercial bank	P	A
Equity Bank Rwanda Limited	Financials	Banks	Kigali	2011	Commercial bank	P	A
Great Lakes Energy	Utilities	Conventional electricity	Kigali	2002	Power utility	P	A
Guaranty Trust Bank	Financials	Banks	Kigali	2004	Commercial bank	P	A
Housing Bank of Rwanda	Financials	Banks	Kigali	1975	Commercial bank, defunct 2011	P	D
I&M Bank Rwanda Limited	Financials	Banks	Kigali	1963	Commercial bank	P	A
KCB Bank Rwanda Limited	Financials	Banks	Kigali	2008	Commercial bank	P	A
National Bank of Rwanda	Financials	Banks	Kigali	1964	Central bank	S	A
National Post Office	Industrials	Delivery services	Kigali	1922	Postal services	P	A
Rwanda Development Bank	Financials	Banks	Kigali	1967	Development bank	P	A
Rwanda Mountain Tea	Food processing	Beverage	Kigali	2005	Tea Company	P	A
Rwanda Stock Exchange	Financials	Investment services	Kigali	2011	Exchange	P	A
RwandAir	Consumer services	Airlines	Kigali	2002	Flag carrier airline	S	A
Rwandatel	Telecommunications	Fixed line telecommunications	Kigali	1993	Defunct 2011	P	D
Silverback Cargo Freighters	Industrials	Delivery services	Kigali	2002	Defunct 2009	P	D
SORAS Group Limited	Financials	Full line insurance	Kigali	1984	Insurance	P	A
Terracom	Telecommunications	Mobile telecommunications	Kigali	2006	Mobile network	P	A
Unguka Bank	Financials	Banks	Kigali	2005	Microfinance bank	P	A
Urwego Opportunity Bank	Financials	Banks	Kigali	2007	Microfinance bank	P	A
Water Consulting East Africa	Industrials	Engineering and contracting services	Kigali	2007	Water engineering consultancy	P	A
Zigama Credit and Savings Bank	Financials	Banks	Kigali	1997	Microfinance bank	P	A

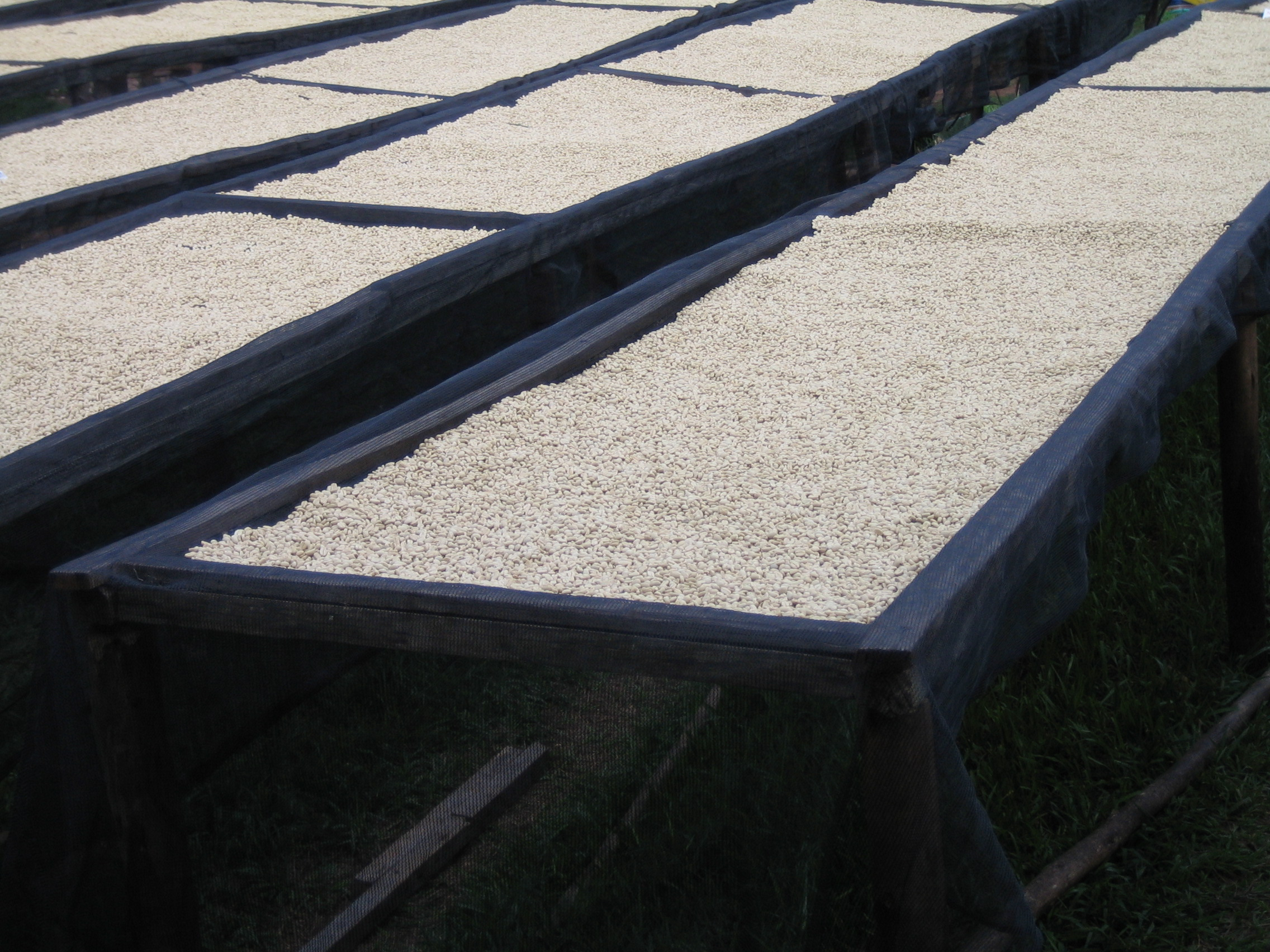
Coffee beans drying in Maraba. Coffee is one of Rwanda's major cash crops.

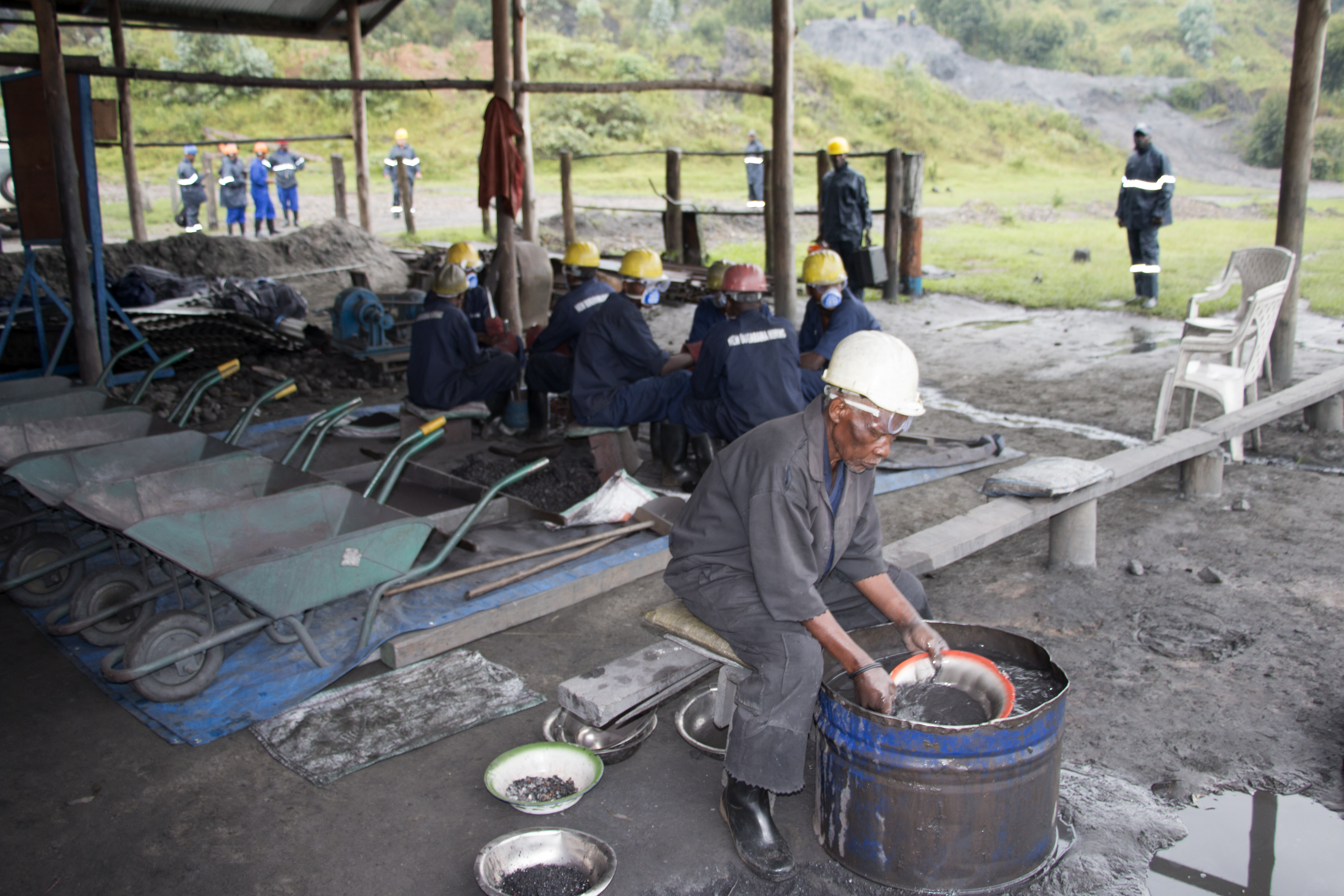
The New Bugurama Mining Company tungsten mine in Rwanda

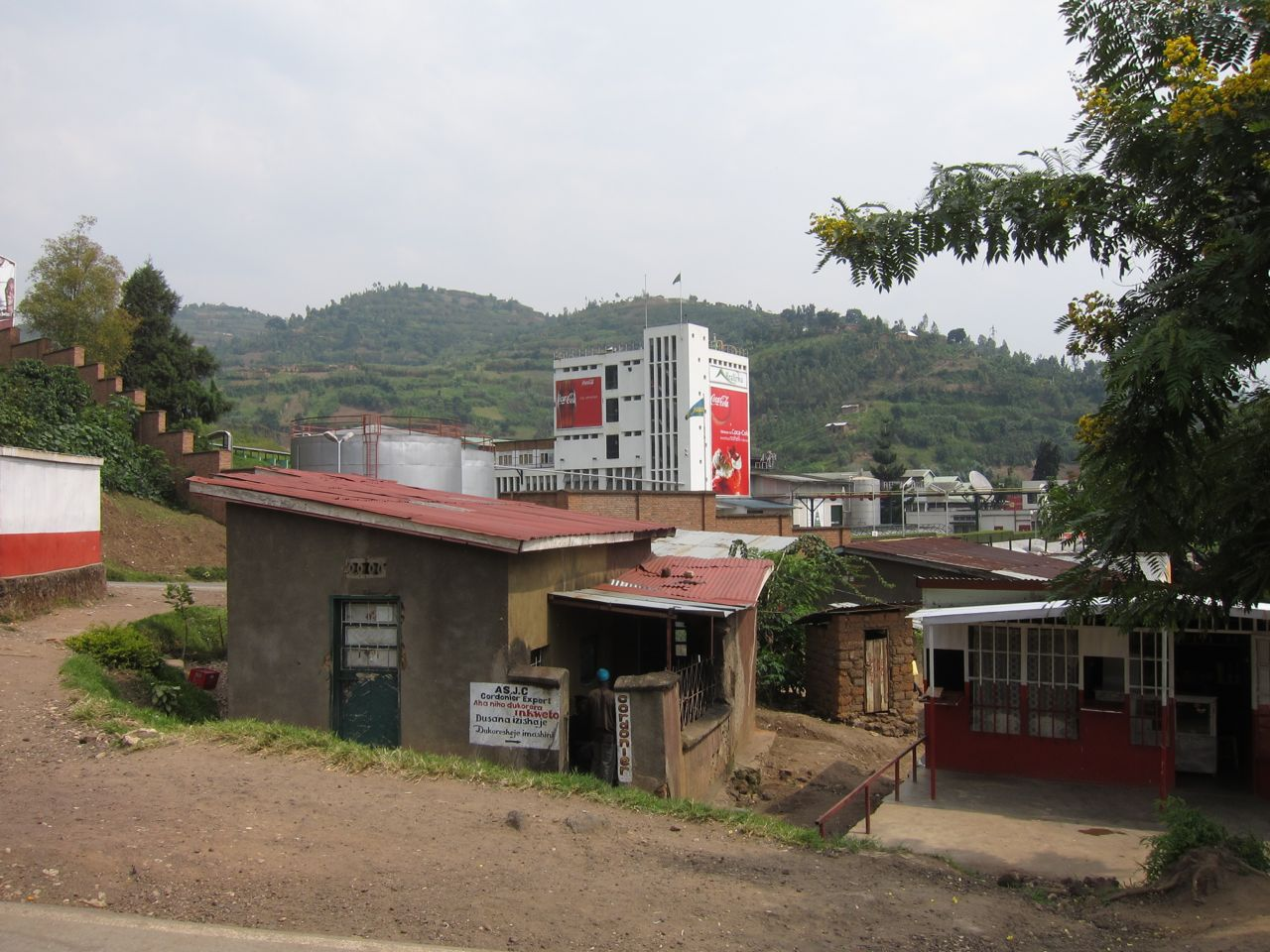
Bralirwa Brewery in Kigali

== See also ==
- List of supermarket chains in Rwanda
- Rwanda Over The Counter Exchange
