= CFG Bank =

Moroccan bank

- Company type: Société anonyme
- Traded as: CSE: CFG
- Industry: Banking, financial services
- Founded: 1992; 34 years ago
- Founders: Adil Douiri, Amyn Alami
- Headquarters: Casablanca, Morocco
- Key people: Adil Douiri (President)
- Products: Banking; Asset management; Commodities; Credit cards; Equities trading; Insurance; Investment management; Mortgage loans; Private equity; Wealth management
- Number of employees: 509 (2023)
- Website: cfgbank.com

CFG Bank, formerly known as Casablanca Finance Group, is a Moroccan bank founded in 1992. Initially Morocco’s first investment bank, it became a universal bank in 2015, offering services to the general public. The bank is listed on the Casablanca Stock Exchange.

== History ==
In 1992, upon their return to Morocco, Adil Douiri and Amyn Alami co-founded Morocco's first investment bank, originally named Casablanca Finance Group.

They were supported by Abdelaziz El Alami (chairman of BCM) and Othman Benjelloun (chairman of BMCE Bank, now Bank of Africa).

In 1998, it acquired a license as a bank specializing in market activities.

In 2000, under the brand Dar Tawfir, CFG Group began distributing savings products to individuals and in 2005 launched the first online stock trading site in Morocco, Africa, and the Middle East.

In November 2015, CFG Group became CFG Bank.

Since 2016, the Moroccan bank has been partnering with the US-based digital banking technology company Temenos (previously Kony) to develop its “digital-first” offering.

In October 2023, CFG Bank aims to be listed on the Casablanca Stock Exchange, which will involve a capital increase with an expected amount of 600 million dirhams, approximately 55 million euros.

== See also ==
- List of banks in Morocco
