= Disty Technologies =

Moroccan IT distribution company

- Type: Public
- Traded as: MASI: DYT
- Industry: IT distribution
- Founded: 2012
- Founder: Younès Elhimdy
- Headquarters: Casablanca, Morocco
- Area served: Morocco
- Key people: Younès Elhimdy (CEO)
- Website: https://www.distytechnologies.com

Disty Technologies (in Arabic: ديستي تكنولوجيز) is a Moroccan IT distribution company. Founded in 2012 by Younès Elhimdy, the company was listed on the Casablanca Stock Exchange in July 2022.

== History ==
Disty Technologies was founded in 2012 by Younès Elhimdy as a national importer and distributor of IT products. Between 2013 and 2017, the company expanded its distribution network through partnerships with major technology brands, including HP, Lenovo, Apple, Asus, Microsoft, Hewlett Packard Enterprise, SanDisk and Canon. In 2018, Disty Technologies increased its share capital to 40.5 million Moroccan dirhams.

In January 2020, Disty Technologies entered into a partnership with Bitdefender.

In May 2022, Disty Technologies signed after-sales service agreements with Asus and Canon, and established a dedicated subsidiary, S.L.A Technologies.

In July 2022, Disty Technologies received approval from the Moroccan Capital Market Authority and was listed on the Casablanca Stock Exchange through a transaction combining a capital increase and a secondary share offering.

In 2023, Disty Technologies announced distribution agreements wit LG Electronics and Honeywell.

In 2023, Disty Technologies reported revenue of 540.8 million Moroccan dirhams, representing a 9% increase compared with the previous financial year.

In March 2024, PME Croissance partially divested its stake in Disty Technologies, transferring 27,652 shares to AD Moroccan Equity Fund and 22,253 shares to another collective investment scheme. As a result of this transaction, PME Croissance fell below the regulatory ownership threshold of 10% of the company's share capital. The transaction also enabled AD Moroccan Equity Fund to exceed the 5% threshold, reaching a 5.47% stake in Disty Technologies. A few months later, PME Croissance sold its remaining shares (49,906 shares) to Younès Elhimdy, resulting in its complete exit from the company's shareholding structure.

In 2024, Disty Technologies reported revenue of 547.8 million Moroccan dirhams.

In October 2025, Disty Technologies and Acer signed a partnership agreement for the distribution of Acer's products in Morocco.
