= Bank of Africa Ghana =

Ghanaian commercial bank

Bank of Africa Ghana Limited
- Type: Private
- Industry: Financial services
- Founded: 1997
- Headquarters: Accra, Ghana
- Number of locations: 23 branches
- Key people: Abderrahmane Belbachir, managing director Fatoumata Gakou, deputy managing director
- Products: Loans, transaction accounts, savings, investments, debit cards
- Revenue: ▼Aftertax:US$9,420,161.62 (GHS:111,911,520 (2023)
- Total assets: ▲US$ 274,053,442.42 (GHS 3,225,754,896 (2023)
- Parent: Bank of Africa Group
- Website: www.boaghana.com

Bank of Africa Ghana Limited, also referred to as BOA Ghana, is a commercial bank in Ghana. It is one of the commercial banks licensed by Bank of Ghana, the central bank of Ghana, and the national banking regulator. the bank has 33 branches in 2015.

BOA Ghana is a large financial services provider in Ghana. As of December 2011, the total asset valuation of the bank was estimated at US$300 million (GHS:735.5 million). The bank is a member of Bank of Africa Group, a multinational, Pan African bank headquartered in Bamako, Mali, with presence in fourteen African countries: Benin, Burkina Faso, Burundi, Democratic Republic of the Congo, Djibouti, Ghana, Kenya, Ivory Coast, Madagascar, Mali, Niger, Senegal, Tanzania and Uganda. The group also maintains an office in Paris, France.

== History ==
The bank was incorporated in 1997, as Amalgamated Bank Limited. In 2006, Meeky Enterprises of Nigeria, acquired 49% shareholding in AmalBank. At that time, Meeky was also a major shareholder in Oceanic Bank, a Nigerian financial services provider which was later acquired by Ecobank Nigeria. In April 2011, majority shareholding (60%) in AmalBank was acquired by the Bank of Africa Group. AmalBank rebranded to Bank of Africa (Ghana).

== Ownership ==
The stock of Bank of Africa (Ghana) is owned by the following corporate entities and individuals.

Bank of Africa (Ghana) stock ownership

Rank	Name of owner	Percentage ownership
1	Bank of Africa Group	60.00
2	Meeky Enterprises of Nigeria	
3	Others	
	Total	100.00

== Branch network ==
In 2024, the bank had 25 branches at the following locations:

- Amakom Business Office – 323 24 February Road, Amakom, Kumasi
- Adum Business Office – 10 Mission Road, Adum, Kumasi
- Maamobi Business Office – 165 Nima Highway, Accra
- New Town Business Office – B Plaza, Hill Street at New Town-Pigfarm Road, New Town
- Accra Central Business Office – Ollivant Arcade, Former UTC Building Accra Central
- Business Centre Office – Ground Floor, The Octagon, Ridge, Accra
- Michel Camp Road Business Office – Aseidua Plaza, Tulaku, Tema
- Spintex Business Office – Adjacent Glory Oil Filling station, Batsona-Spintex Road, Tema
- Tamale Business Office – 8 Daboya Street, Old Market, Tamale
- Osu Business Office – No. F88/1, Cantonments Road (Oxford Street), Osu
- Takoradi Business Office – 10 Market Circle, Takoradi
- Kwashieman Business Office – No. 248, Motorway Ext., Kwashieman (Hong Kong), Accra
- East Legon Business Office – 38B Lagos Avenue, East Legon, Accra
- Dansoman Business Office – No.C300 Dansoman Estates, Sahara Dansoman, Accra
- Madina Business Office – H/N B90, Near Hollywood-Madina Zongo Junction,Madina
- Abossey Okai Business Office – Mortuary Road, Abossey Okai, Accra
- Tema Business Office – Ground Floor, Heights of Greener pastures Plaza,Comm 1 Tema, Tema
- Kejetia Business Office– Former S.A.T Building Kumasi, Kumasi
- Wa Business Office- Block “B” Dobile Residential Area, IEPER Street Wa
- Bolgatanga Business Office- Plot No. 394, Central Residential Area
- Suame Business Office- Plot No. 2 Block T, S.K. Bonsu Storey Building, Tarkwa-Maakro, Kumasi
- Teshie Nungua Business Office- Parcel No 129, Block 6, Section 73, Nungua, Adjacent Kpeshie Divisional Police
- Opera Square Business Office- No. D1, Opera Cinema Building Pagan Rd, Accra
- Octagon Business Office- Ground Floor, The Octagon, Independence Avenue, Accra
- Airport Business Office- Plot No. 19, Holiday Inn Hotel Airport City, Accra

== See also ==
- Bank of Africa Group
- List of banks in Ghana
- AmalBank
- Economy of Ghana
- Bank of Africa Kenya Limited
- Bank of Africa Rwanda Limited
- Bank of Africa Tanzania Limited
- Bank of Africa Uganda Limited
