= Banque Marocaine du Commerce =

Banque Marocaine du Commerce can refer to one of two banking companies:

- BMCE Bank (Banque Marocaine du Commerce Extérieur)
- BMCI (Banque Marocaine du Commerce et de l'Industrie)
