= Bank of Africa =

International bank headquartered in Morocco

Bank of Africa Group

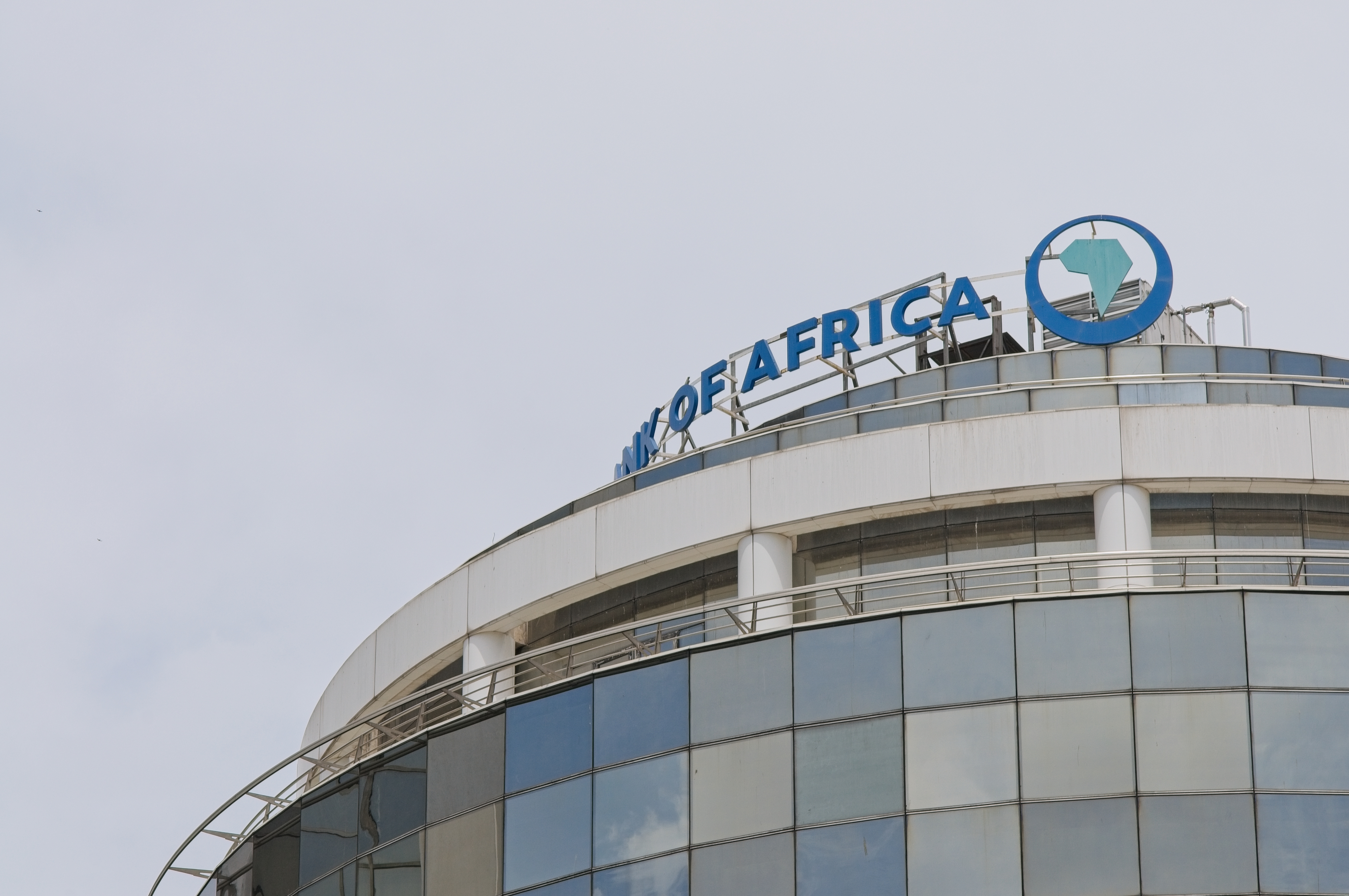
- Headquarter of Bank of Africa 10/05/2026
- Type: Public
- Traded as: CSE: BOA
- Industry: Financial services
- Founded: August 31, 1959; 66 years ago
- Headquarters: Casablanca, Morocco
- Key people: Othman Benjelloun (Group chairman & CEO)
- Products: Banking; Asset management; Commodities; Credit cards; Equities trading; Insurance; Investment management; Mortgage loans; Private equity; Wealth management
- Net income: ▲€ 215 million (2025)
- Total assets: ▲€ 40.7 billion (2025)
- Total equity: ▲€ 3 billion (2025)
- Number of employees: ▲14,900 (2025)
- Subsidiaries: BOA-BENIN; BOA-MADAGASCAR; BOA-COTE D'IVOIRE; BOA-MALI; BOA-BURKINA FASO; BOA-NIGER; BOA-KENYA; BOA-SENEGAL; BOA-UGANDA; Banque de Crédit de Bujumbura; BOA-TANZANIA; BOA-RDC; BOA-MER ROUGE; BOA-GHANA; BOA-TOGO; BOA-RWANDA; BOA-FRANCE; BMCE Capital; Maghrebail; Salafin; Maroc Factoring; RM Experts; Bank Al Karam; Banque de Développement du Mali (BDM); LCB Bank; BANK OF AFRICA SHANGHAI; BANK OF AFRICA UK
- Website: bankofafrica.ma

Bank of Africa (BOA), formerly Banque Marocaine du Commerce Extérieur (BMCE), is a Moroccan international financial services group headquartered in Casablanca.

The group originated from BMCE’s 2010 acquisition of Bank of Africa, a banking network founded in 1982 in Mali. Established in 1959, BMCE subsequently integrated the Bank of Africa network into its operations. In 2020, its commercial banking activities were rebranded under the Bank of Africa name, while the BMCE designation continues within the group’s corporate identity through the byline “BMCE Group.”

As of 2024, the bank is the third-largest in Morocco. Its major shareholders include Royale Marocaine d'Assurance (RMA), an insurance company controlled by Moroccan financier Othman Benjelloun, and the French cooperative banking group Crédit Mutuel Alliance Fédérale. The remainder of the share capital is held by institutional investors and the public. Listed on the Casablanca Stock Exchange, Bank of Africa operates in numerous African countries, offering a broad range of financial services across the continent.

== History ==
=== Banque Marocaine du Commerce Extérieur ===
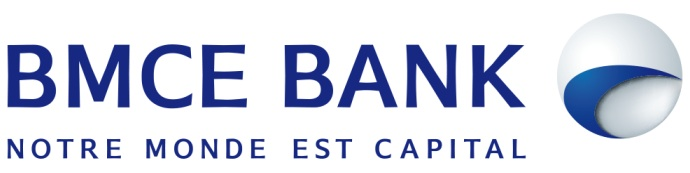
BMCE logo in 2015

At the time of Moroccan independence, the new country's banking system was dominated by French banks, namely the Banque Commerciale du Maroc controlled by Crédit Industriel et Commercial and the local operations of Banque Nationale pour le Commerce et l'Industrie, Crédit Lyonnais, and Société Générale as well as Algeria-centric Compagnie Algérienne and Crédit Foncier d'Algérie et de Tunisie (CFAT). The creation of BMCE in 1959 was the first step in a decades-long process, known locally as marocanisation, of reduction of that colonial legacy.

BMCE was established in 1959 as a government-owned commercial entity and in 1962 opened its capital to foreign strategic investors, the main one being Banca Commerciale Italiana (BCI) which had been present in Morocco since 1928 and brought BMCE its network of branches in the country. By late 1962, the foreign shareholders included BCI (16.7 percent), Mouton Roger Group (12.5 percent), Banco di Roma, Bank of America, Bank of West Africa (BWA), Banque Française du Commerce Extérieur, Commerzbank, and Skandinaviska Banken (2.8 percent each); private Moroccan shareholders held an additional 4.2 percent, while the Moroccan government retained 50 percent. In 1965 BWA, acquired that year by Standard Bank, transferred to BMCE its branch in Tangier.

In 1971, BMCE took over the bulk of the Société de Banque du Maghreb (SBM), the Moroccan subsidiary of the former CFAT, while Société Générale Morocco acquired about a fifth of the SBM's activity. BMCE then opened its first overseas branch in Paris in 1972, and listed on the Casablanca Stock Exchange in 1974. In 1975, it absorbed the Banco Español en Marruecos, headquartered in Tétouan, and in 1989 opened BMCE International in Madrid, which in 1993 became part of a fully-fledged Spanish subsidiary.

In 1989, it took a minority stake in the public development bank of Mali, the first expansion of a Moroccan bank into sub-Saharan Africa. In 1995, it was privatized and taken over by Othman Benjelloun through his controlling ownership of insurer Royale Marocaine d'Assurance.

=== Bank of Africa ===
Bank of Africa was established in late 1982, in Bamako, Mali, by local businesspeople. It was formed to address the scarcity of banking services for local businesses and individuals, which was prevalent not only in Mali at that time, but across most of Francophone West Africa. This initial effort was without any external financial backing.

The initial success of BOA led to the group gradual expansion and reorganization away from its Malian origins. In 1988, African Financial Holdings (AFH) was established in Luxembourg as a holding company for BOA Mali and operations to be added in other African countries. The objectives of AFH were to promote the establishment of banking subsidiaries across Africa, with local capital participation as a key component and to offer both management, technical support as well as equity participation in these new banking subsidiaries. To increase their capital base, AFH then took on new investors including Proparco (an affiliate of the French Development Agency), the Netherlands Development Finance Company (FMO), and Paris-based Natexis (later Natixis).

AFH / Bank of Africa Group expanded through a mix of internal growth and acquisitions, including:

- 1994: Nigerian International Bank (NIB) in Niamey, Niger, established in 1989
- 1996: Banafrique in Abidjan, Côte d'Ivoire, est. 1980
- 1999: National Bank for Rural Development (Bankin'ny Tantsaha Mpamokatra - BTM) in Antananarivo, Madagascar, est. 1979
- 2004: Banque Indosuez's branch in Nairobi, Kenya, est. 1981; the BOA's first expansion beyond French-speaking Africa
- 2006: Allied Bank in Kampala, Uganda, est. 1985 as Sembule Investment Bank and renamed in 1996
- 2007: Eurafrican Bank in Dar es Salaam, Tanzania, est. 1995
- 2008: Banque de Crédit de Bujumbura in Bujumbura, Burundi, est. 1922 as a branch of Banque du Congo Belge and renamed in 1964
- 2010: Banque Indosuez Mer Rouge in Djibouti, est. 1908 as a branch of the Banque de l'Indochine
- 2011: AmalBank in Accra, Ghana, est. 1999
- 2015: Agaseke Bank in Kigali, Rwanda, est. 2003

Meanwhile BOA established and grew operations of its own in Benin (1990), Burkina Faso (1998), Senegal (2001), the Democratic Republic of the Congo (2010), Togo (2013), and Ethiopia (2014). In 2004, in partnership with the local government, it also created a specialized mortgage bank in Cotonou, the Banque de l'Habitat du Benin (BHB), which however did not develop as significantly as initially envisaged. In 2010, BOA opened a subsidiary in France, developing from an earlier representative office opened in Paris in 2000.

=== Merger and aftermath ===
In 2008, Luxembourg-based AFH, the parent company of the Bank of Africa Group, rebranded itself into Bank of Africa Group S.A., and BMCE took a 35% shareholding interest, bringing financial capital and banking expertise. BMCE became majority owner of the BOA group in 2010, and held a 72.6 percent equity stake by 2013.

In 2020, BMCE itself assumed the new name Bank of Africa - BMCE Group. Through successive transactions since 2004, Crédit Mutuel Alliance Fédérale has become the second major shareholder of the group with 25% of the company's equity as of end-2020. The largest shareholder remains Othman Benjelloun at 27.4 percent, through his O Capital holding company and insurance company RMA Watanya.

Bank of Africa was ranked 29th on the Forbes Middle East's 30 Most Valuable Banks 2025 list.

== Operations ==
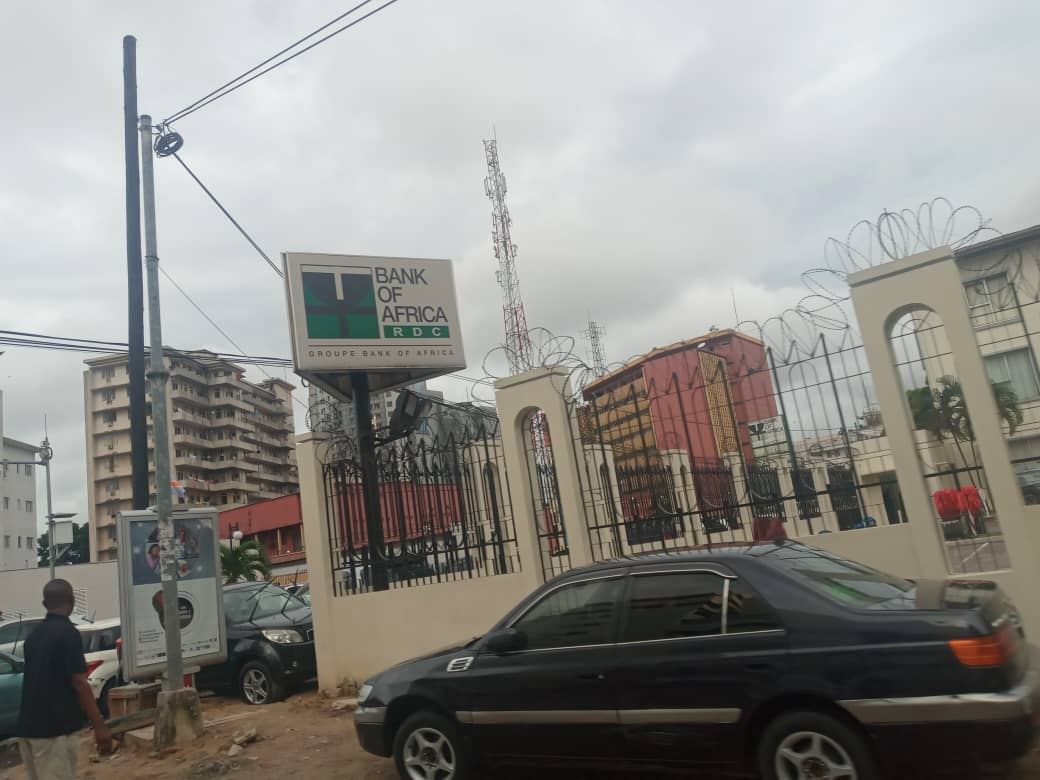
A Bank of Africa sign in Kinshasa, DRC

As of end-2023, Bank of Africa S.A. (Luxembourg) remained as an internal holding company of the group, with its equity capital owned by Bank of Africa - BMCE Group (72.41 percent), FMO (9.41 percent), Proparco (3.73 percent), and other shareholders (14.45 percent). The sub-Saharan African country in which BOA held the most assets was Burkina Faso, followed by Ivory Coast and Benin. In total, international activities (outside Morocco) represented 32 percent of the group's consolidated assets at end-2023.

Also at end-2023, Bank of Africa - BMCE Group retained direct control of operations in Morocco, while BOA SA had majority-owned subsidiaries in Benin (54.1 percent stake), Burkina Faso (56.5 percent), the DRC (86.6 percent), Djibouti (100 percent), France (94.8 percent), Ghana (98 percent), Kenya (89.5 percent), Ivory Coast (69.8 percent), Madagascar (61.1 percent), Mali (64.2 percent), Niger (59.1 percent), Rwanda (95 percent), Senegal (61.7 percent), Tanzania (96.2 percent), Togo (94.5 percent), and Uganda (92.2 percent), as well as minority stakes in the Banque de l'Habitat du Bénin (24.2 percent) and Banque de Crédit de Bujumbura (24.22 percent). The individual entities' other shareholders are typically a mix of Western and multilateral development institutions, and local individuals and entities. BOA also maintains representative offices in Ethiopia, Spain, the United Kingdom, China, Italy, Germany, UAE, Belgium, Canada, and the Netherlands.

Nonbank subsidiaries:

- Banque de l'Habitat du Bénin (BHB)
- Equipbail Benin
- Equipbail Mali
- Equipbail Mada
- Actibourse SA
- Aissa, BOA's IT company
- Attica SA

Additional entities of the BOA Group:

- BMCE Bank International
- BMCE Capital

== See also ==
- Ecobank
- Standard Bank
- United Bank for Africa
- Zenith Bank
- Africa Morocco Link
- List of banks in Morocco
