= Bank of Africa Kenya =

Bank of Kenya

Bank of Africa Kenya Limited
- Type: Private
- Industry: Banking and finance
- Predecessor: Calyon Bank Kenya Limited
- Founded: 2004
- Headquarters: Nairobi, Kenya
- Key people: Dennis Awori (chairman); Ronald Marambii (managing director)
- Products: Loans, mortgages, investments, debit cards, credit cards
- Revenue: ▼KES: 2.04 billion (US$ 18.7 million) (2019)
- Total assets: ▲KES:43.996 billion (US$403.27 million) (2019)
- Number of employees: 530+ (2016)
- Website: boakenya.com

Bank of Africa Kenya Limited (BOA Kenya) is a commercial bank in Kenya. It is one of the commercial banks licensed by Central Bank of Kenya, the country's central bank and the national banking regulator.

== Overview ==
BOA Kenya is a mid-tier bank and is ranked 15th out of the 42 commercial banks in Kenya by the CBK. The bank provides banking services to corporations, SMEs, investment groups, and individuals. As at 31 December 2019, the bank's total assets were valued at KES:43.996 billion (US$403.27 million), with shareholders' equity valued at KSh4.28 billion (approx. USD39.2 million. The bank's customer base was in excess of 100,000, as of March 2016.

== History ==
The bank traces its roots from Calyon Bank (formally Credit Agricole Indosuez) which was founded in 1981. In April 2004, Groupe Bank of Africa (BOA Group) acquired the operations of Credit Agricole Indosuez in Kenya and incorporated them into its newly formed subsidiary BOA Kenya. This transaction was completed on June 30, 2004.

BOA Kenya has invested in BOA Uganda (52.72%), making it a subsidiary and a 24.1% stake in BOA Tanzania, making it an associate.

== Ownership ==
BOA Kenya is a member of the Mali based Bank of Africa Group. As of December 2019, shareholding in the bank's stock was as depicted below:

BOA Kenya stock ownership
Rank	Name of owner	Percentage ownership
1	Bank of Africa Benin	31.34
2	Bank of Africa Group	24.01
3	Netherlands Development Finance Company (FMO)	13.01
4	Bank of Africa Madagascar	11.65
5	Bank of Africa Ivory Coast	11.00
6	Bank of Africa (Red Sea)	7.03
7	Agora S.A.*	1.95
	Total	100.00

Note: Bank of Africa Group is a subsidiary of Moroccan based Banque Marocaine du Commerce Exterieur.

== Governance ==
BOA Kenya is governed by a ten-person board of directors, with Dennis Awori as chairman and Ronald Marambii as managing director.

== See also ==
- List of banks in Kenya
- Bank of Africa
- Bank of Africa Ghana Limited
- Bank of Africa Rwanda Limited
- Bank of Africa Uganda Limited
