= EQD =

EQD or EqD may refer to:

== EqD ==
- Equestria Daily, fandom news site for the My Little Pony franchise

== EQD ==
- An alias of musician Shed (born 1975)
- Elite Qualifying Dollars, a metric used for calculating miles for AAdvantage status
- MASI index symbol for Eqdom, a Moroccan consumer finance company
- Abbreviation of EarthQuaker Devices, an American effects pedal manufacturer
