= Amalgamated Bank (disambiguation) =

Amalgamated Bank is a union-owned bank headquartered in New York City. It may also refer to:

- Amalgamated Bank of Chicago, a former sister institution to the Amalgamated Bank
- Amalgamated Bank Limited, more commonly known as AmalBank
- Absa Group Limited, formerly named Amalgamated Banks of South Africa
