= Siké Billé =

Sociologist, Cameroonian feminist and activist against forced early marriage

- Citizenship: Cameroonian
- Education: University of Paris VIII 1970s
- Occupations: Sociologist, feminist, and women's rights activist
- Years active: 1970-present
- Organization: Association for the Fight Against Violence Against Women
- Title: Co-founder of the Cameroon chapter of the Inter-African Committee

Siké Billé is a sociologist, activist and pioneer of feminism in Cameroon. Originally from the Littoral Region, she is a co-founder of the Association for the Fight Against Violence Against Women (ALVF). Through her activism, she is a pioneer in the fight against early and forced marriage in the Far North Region, as well as at the national and international levels.

== Biography ==
Siké Billé studied sociology at the University of Paris VIII in the 1970s. At that time, although she understood what feminist ideology entailed, she was not convinced of the movement's relevance to her own life. Nevertheless, she joined a left-wing opposition group alongside other Cameroonian students specifically, the Women's Liberation Movement. This experience inadvertently sparked her feminism.

Siké Billé and two other Cameroonian women, Esther Endalé and Ngobo Ekotto, took part in the International Women's Day event organized in Paris in 1979. Following that event, the three women who had met in Paris, thousands of kilometers from their homes reportedly vowed that one day they would bring their women's rights activism back to Cameroon.

In 1991, joined by four other women, Siké Billé, Esther Endalé, and Ngobo Ekotto founded the Association for the Fight Against Violence Against Women (ALVF) in the capital, Yaoundé. This association thus replaces the Women's Collective for Renewal, an organization they had previously established but which was banned by the Cameroonian government due to its political orientation. The founders of ALVF, who now campaign against violence against women, address forms of violence encompassing physical, psychological, sexual, political, social, and economic dimensions.

In 1996, Sike Billé working in the public service, is assigned as a sociologist in village hydraulics projects in the Far North. Upon her arrival, she met several women, including Aïssa Doumara, who had been forced into marriage as a teenager and compelled to leave school before later returning. With the latter, Siké Billé who sought to establish a women's organization in a region where gender-based violence is widespread and women have virtually no knowledge of their rights founded ALVF Maroua in March of that same year. Two years later, the two women opened the first ALVF "Women's Life Centre" (Centre Vie de femmes), a facility dedicated to women's empowerment.

From her experience through the activities of the ALVF Far North branch, Siké Billé very quickly noticed that the women who showed up at the gates of ALVF had in common, a forced early marriage and abandonment by their spouse. These young women are thus left to their own devices with dependent children. That is why Siké Billé has decided to dedicate herself to eradicating forced early marriage and empowering the victims of such abuse.

As part of her activism against early marriage, Siké Billé campaigns across Cameroon and pressures the government to implement strategies to combat child marriage. She also believes it is important to mobilize the educational community, victims of child marriage, and their parents to take a stand against the practice. She thereby denounces Cameroonian law, which allows parents to marry off a 15-year-old girl, whereas the age of marriage is set at 18 for boys.

In 2001, ALVF Extrême Nord (ALVF-EN), which already had branches in Maroua and Kousseri, helped a group of young women attending the Women's Life Center to establish APAD. Having become an independent organization in 2009, APAD enables abuse victims to support one another and promotes victim empowerment in the Far North region.

In 2002, while working as a specialist in strategies to combat early and forced marriage, Siké Billé managed the "Strategies to Combat Early and Forced Marriage" project in the Far North region. She also authored several tools for analyzing this form of violence, namely: the analysis tree for strategies to combat early and forced marriage, the profile of a survivor of early and forced marriage, and the theory of change regarding the fight against early and forced marriage. Justine Kwachu, Director of Women in Alternative Action in Cameroon, also reacts to the launch of the campaign: "This is the opportunity for members of Girls Not Brides in Cameroon to take activities of the campaign beyond the launch, and ensure that the national strategy is effective and implemented by all stakeholders."

Siké Billé is director of the NGO Girls Not Brides. She is also a co-founder of the Cameroon chapter of the Inter-African Committee. The organization's work has revealed that genital mutilation is also practiced in Cameroon. Siké Billé's dream is for the ALVF to establish several centers for the empowerment of women who are victims of violence in other cities across Cameroon.
