= Maroc PME =

Moroccan public institution

Maroc PME is a Moroccan public institution dedicated to supporting very small, small, and medium-sized enterprises as part of the country's economic and industrial development policies.

== History ==
The institution was established in 2002 under the name National Agency for the Promotion of Small and Medium Enterprises (ANPME) as part of Morocco's public efforts to strengthen the country's SME sector. In 2014, the agency was rebranded as Maroc PME.

In May 2026, Maroc PME signed a framework agreement with the Casablanca Stock Exchange to facilitate access for Moroccan very small, small, and medium-sized enterprises to the capital markets.

== Missions ==
Maroc PME implements public support programs for businesses, with particular emphasis on industrial SMEs and very small enterprises (VSEs). Its activities are aimed at assisting companies with development, modernization, investment, innovation, digital transformation, and competitiveness improvement projects.

Its main areas of intervention include:

- supporting SMEs in their investment projects;
- assisting with the modernization and transformation of businesses;
- promoting innovation, digitalization, and competitiveness improvement;
- supporting companies in their export development;
- implementing sector-specific programs and public support mechanisms;
- strengthening industrial integration and the upgrading of Moroccan companies.

Maroc PME provides both technical and financial support, often in collaboration with public and private sector partners. The agency also organizes meetings, regional outreach events, and information programs to help businesses better understand and access available government support schemes.
