= Eqdom =

Moroccan consumer finance company

EQDOM
- Company type: S.A.
- Traded as: MASI: EQD
- Industry: Consumer finance
- Founded: 1974; 52 years ago
- Founder: Moroccan State
- Headquarters: Casablanca, Morocco
- Number of locations: 127 Boulevard Zerktouni, 20100 Casablanca
- Key people: Younes Benboujida (CEO)
- Products: Consumer loans, automobile financing
- Revenue: MAD 580.75 million (2021)
- Net income: MAD 32.6 million (2021)
- Parent: Société Générale
- Website: www.eqdomnet.ma

EQDOM is a Moroccan consumer finance company specializing in personal and automobile credit solutions.

== History ==
Founded by the Moroccan State through the Société Nationale d'Investissement (SNI) and the Caisse de Dépôt et de Gestion (CDG) in 1974 to provide equipment financing for civil servants, EQDOM was listed on the Casablanca Stock Exchange in 1978. Société Générale acquired majority control in 2002 through its Moroccan subsidiary.

In April 2024, Société Générale announced plans to sell its Moroccan banking assets including EQDOM to Saham Group, marking a new ownership phase.

== Activities ==
In the 2020s, EQDOM diversified its activities by offering services to individual clients and expanding its range of products.

By 2023, it was regarded as a "specialist in consumer credit," although its net banking income had declined.
