= Louis Vachon =

Canadian banker (born 1962)

- Born: 1962 (age 63–64); Quebec, Canada
- Education: Bates College; Tufts University
- Occupations: Banker, financier, and business executive
- Years active: 1985 - present
- Employer(s): J.C. Flowers & Co (present); National Bank of Canada (1996-2021); Bankers Trust (1990 - 1996); Citibank (1985 - 1986)
- Known for: Leading the National Bank of Canada as CEO
- Board member of: Groupe CH; Molson Coors Brewing Company; OSMO Foundation; Alimentation Couche-Tard; BCE; CFG Bank

Louis Vachon CM (French: [lu.i vaʃɔ̃]; born 1962) is a Canadian banker, financier, and business executive. He is the former chief executive officer of National Bank of Canada, the 6th largest bank in Canada. Louis Vachon announced his intention to retire on October 31, 2021, after nearly 15 years in the role. He has been CEO since 2007, previously serving as the bank's chief operating officer. Before taking a full-time position at the bank, he was the president and CEO of National Bank Financial Group, the 4th largest investment bank in Canada.

He was named CEO of the Year by Canadian Business in 2014, and the following year he received mixed media coverage for being the highest compensated banking executive in the country. Vachon is an Officer of the Ordre national du Québec. He is a Member of the Order of Canada and of the Ordre de Montréal and a recipient of the Global Citizens Award from the United Nations Association in Canada.

== Early life and education ==
Vachon was born in 1962, in Quebec, Canada. His great grandmother Rose-Anna Vachon, started an eponymous pastry company in Beauce and his father served as the Dean of School of Business at Sherbrooke University. He spoke about his upbringing in Canadian Business, stating, "Being a successful business person was highly valued in our family."

He entered Bates College, in Lewiston, Maine in 1979 and became interested in finance early on. Paul Erdman's The Billion Dollar Sure Thing played a role in his interest and shaped his early thoughts on financial markets. Vachon graduated from college in 1983, with a B.A. in economics, and went on to graduate from The Fletcher School of Tufts University, with an M.A. in international finance. Vachon is a chartered financial analyst (CFA).

== Banking career ==
Vachon began his career in 1985 at Citibank and joined Lévesque Beaubien Geoffrion in 1986. He then moved to Bankers Trust in 1990 where he stayed for six years.

=== National Bank Financial ===
Vachon became the president and chief executive officer of Innocap Investment Management, a subsidiary of National Bank of Canada in 1996. In 1997, he became a vice president in the firm, charged with its treasury and overseeing its financial markets. He eventually became the CEO and president of National Bank Financial, the 4th largest investment bank in Canada. During the 2008 financial crisis, the investment bank was one of the only financial institutions to see profit through the crisis. In early 2009, the board of the bank offered him a $1.9 million bonus for his actions during the crisis.

=== National Bank of Canada ===
Vachon was appointed President and Chief Executive of National Bank of Canada on February 2, 2007. In November 2012, Vachon announced that the bank was letting go of nearly 300 jobs in order to tighten expenses and create a streamlined infrastructure. The move was seen, as well, as an economic contraction and had caused Moody's Investor Service to reduce the bank's credit rating down one level while also projecting it might drop it down two levels at the conclusion of the month. Despite the drop in credit rating, the bank stated that Vachon's vision for the future remained unchanged.

His compensation totaled $7,618,503 in 2015, with a base pay of $1,083,333, with other compensation adding up to $6,344,803. Although he heads the 6th largest bank in Canada, he was the most compensated banking executive in 2015. He was criticized for sitting on too many boards as CEO, however Vachon rebutted the claim saying that it was "odd" to say to a CEO, "you can’t sit on an external board even though your company is a major shareholder."

In a December quarterly earnings call with investors and analysts, Vachon stated that the bank had increased positive operating leverage in its common equity and increased its quarterly dividend twice during the fiscal year—close to 7%.

== Personal life ==
Vachon resides in Montreal, Quebec. On November 25, Vachon along with the Mayor of Montreal, Denis Coderre, unveiled an art installation piece that displayed along a six-kilometre (3.73 mile) stretch of Autoroute 20 in honor of Montreal's 375th anniversary. He said that Montreal was "a dynamic city with a reputation for innovation" later noting that "every day, hundreds of thousands of people travel along the stretch of highway between the airport and downtown Montreal, [and this art piece will be] exactly what people will see as they drive into town."

== Awards and honours ==
Vachon has received numerous awards and honors for his work in Canadian investment banking and corporate leadership.

- Named one of "Canada's Top 40 Under 40" (2001)
- Financial Personality of the Year by Finance et Investissement (2012)
- Inducted as Honorary Lieutenant-Colonel of Les Fusiliers Mont-Royal, Montreal (2011)
- Named CEO of the Year by Canadian Business magazine (2014)
- Financial Personality of the Year by Finance et Investissement (2014)
- Honorary doctorate by Bishop's University (2015)
- Honorary doctorate by University of Ottawa (2016)
- Awarded the Global Citizens Award from the United Nations Association in Canada (2016)
- Appointed as a Member of the Order of Canada (2016)
- Appointed as a Member of the Ordre de Montréal (2018)
- Appointed Officer of the Ordre national du Québec (2019)
- Honorary doctorate by Ryerson University (now Toronto Metropolitan University) (2017)
- Honorary doctorate by Concordia University (2019)
- Honoured by Right to Play during The Heroes Gala (2018)
