= Saham Bank =

Moroccan bank

- Formerly: Société Générale Maroc
- Company type: Public company
- Industry: Financial services
- Founded: 1913; 113 years ago
- Headquarters: Casablanca, Morocco
- Key people: Moulay Hafid Elalamy (Chairman of the Supervisory Board)
- Products: Banking services
- Total assets: US$12 billion (2024)
- Owner: Saham Group (57.66%); Deveco Souss (27.54%); Patrimoine Gestion et Placements (PGP) (3.23%); Other shareholders (11.53%)
- Website: sahambank.com

Saham Bank is a Moroccan commercial bank headquartered in Casablanca. It was originally established in 1913 as the Moroccan subsidiary of the French banking group Société Générale.

On 2024-04-12, Société Générale announced the sale of its 57.7% stake in SGMB to the Saham Group, owned by Moroccan businessman Moulay Hafid Elalamy, including its insurance arm La Marocaine Vie, for €745 million. The rebranding to Saham Bank was made official on 2025-06-18.

== History ==
Société Générale began its Moroccan operations in 1913, opening branches in Casablanca and Tangier shortly after the establishment of the French protectorate in Morocco. In 1923, its Moroccan headquarters were moved from the rue des Consuls in Rabat to a newly constructed building on the prominent boulevard Mohammed V, designed by French architect Edmond Gourdain. The bank's Casablanca network expanded to 7 branches by 1939 and 22 by 1950, alongside new locations in Kenitra and Meknes.

In 1965, SGMB took over the Moroccan operations of Société Marseillaise de Crédit and began further expansion. In 1971, it acquired 20% of the activities of the Société de Banque du Maghreb, the Moroccan branch of the former Crédit Foncier d'Algérie et de Tunisie. The remaining assets were taken over by Banque Marocaine du Commerce Extérieur (BMCE).

In 1979, SGMB relocated its headquarters to a modern building at 55, Boulevard Abdelmoumen in Casablanca.

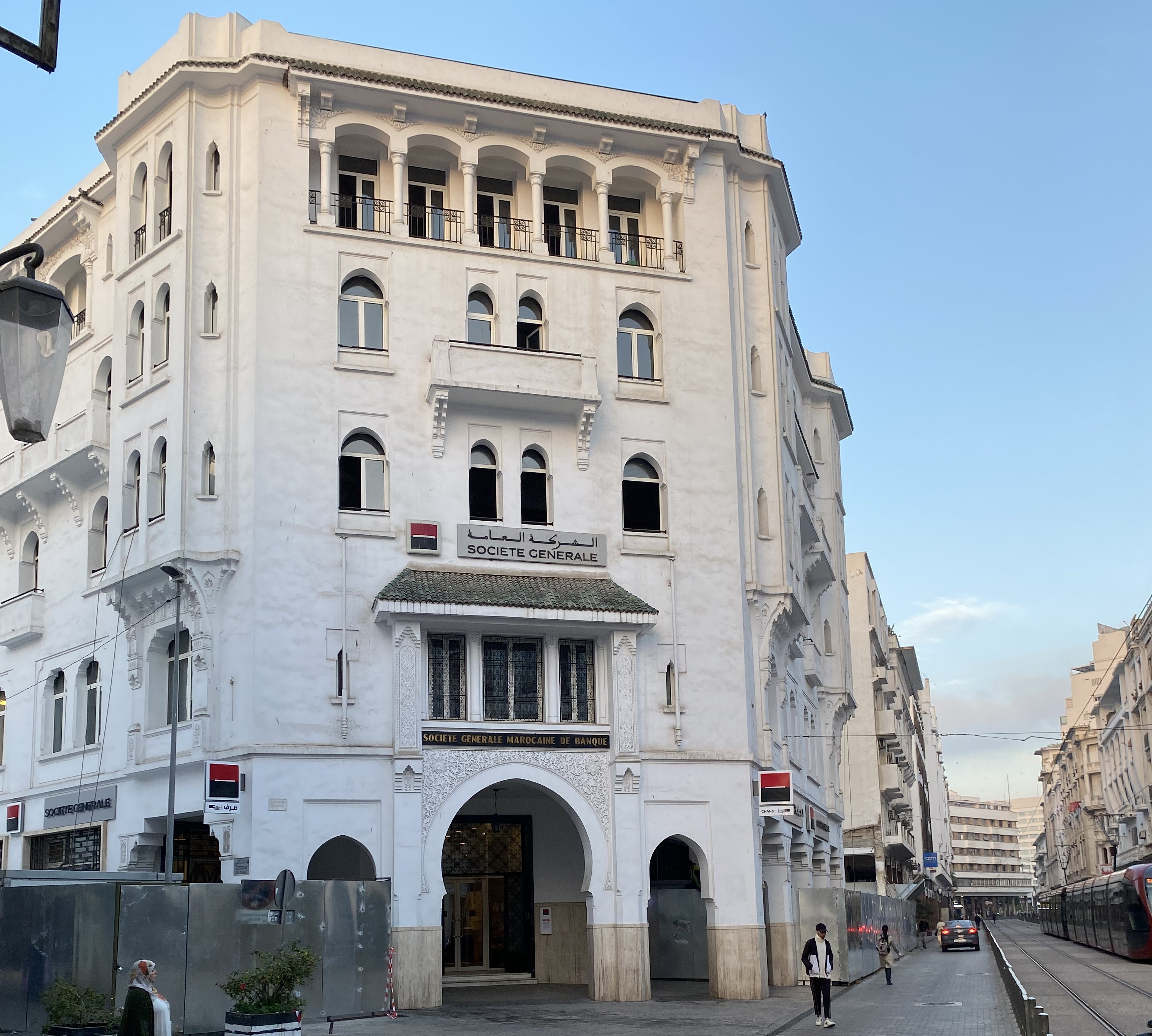
Former head office building on 84, boulevard Mohammed V in Casablanca

During the 1980s and 1990s, the bank consolidated its position in both retail and corporate banking markets. From the early 2000s, it introduced a localized visual identity, featuring a red diamond and dotted square motif, before reverting in December 2007 to the global branding of the Société Générale Group with the signature red-and-black square logo.

By the early 2020s, SGMB was Morocco's fourth-largest bank, behind Attijariwafa Bank, the Banque Populaire Group, and Bank of Africa (formerly BMCE).

On 2024-04-12, Société Générale formally agreed to sell its majority stake in SGMB to Saham Group, marking its exit from the Moroccan retail banking market. The brand officially became Saham Bank on 2025-06-18.

== See also ==
- List of banks in Morocco
