= Crédit du Maroc =

Moroccan commercial bank

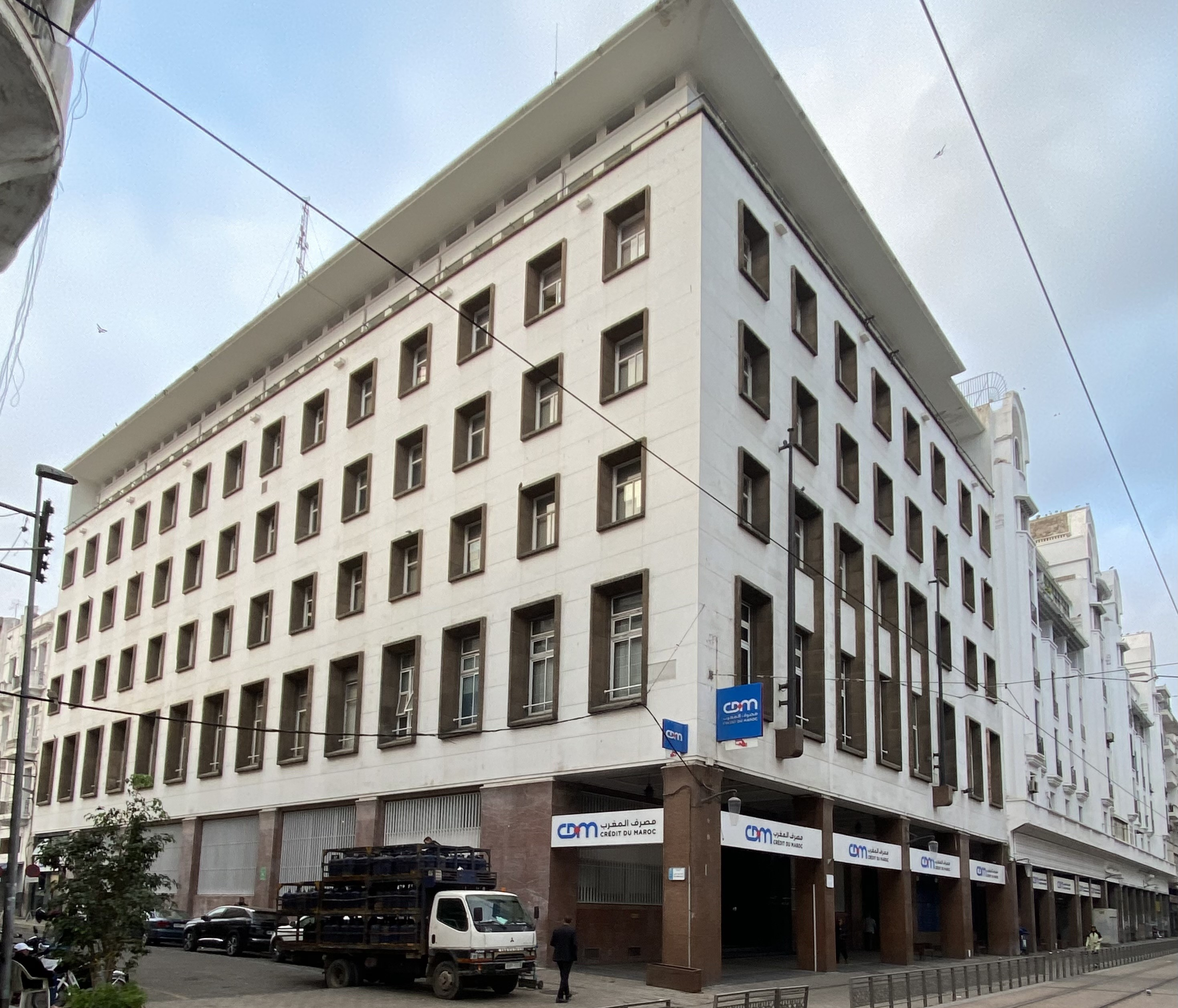
- Former Casablanca branch of Crédit Lyonnais, part of the CDM head office complex
- Company type: Société Anonyme
- Traded as: CSE: CDM
- Industry: Banking
- Founded: 1929; 97 years ago
- Headquarters: Casablanca, Morocco
- Revenue: 2.45 billion dirhams – Net Banking Income (2021)
- Net income: 627.39 million dirhams (2021)
- Parent: Holmarcom Group
- Website: www.creditdumaroc.ma

Crédit du Maroc (CDM; Arabic: مصرف المغرب) is a Moroccan bank founded in 1929. Headquartered in Casablanca, it provides commercial banking services in Morocco and has operated under its current name since 1966.

Crédit du Maroc has experienced several changes in ownership over time. It was previously part of international banking groups and is currently a subsidiary of the Moroccan holding group Holmarcom.

== Overview ==
Crédit Lyonnais established its subsidiary in Casablanca in 1929. In 1950, it relocated to a new head office building designed by architect Edmond Brion on the prestigious boulevard Mohammed V.

In 1966, in response to the newly independent Moroccan government's push for marocanisation or shedding the colonial legacies in its banking sector, the operation was renamed Crédit du Maroc. Crédit Agricole became CDM's owner following its purchase of Crédit Lyonnais in 2003.

In February 2021, Crédit du Maroc signed a partnership with the National Agency for the Promotion of Employment and Skills (ANAPEC) to work on promoting entrepreneurship.

In late April 2022, Crédit Agricole announced the sale of its 78.7 percent stake in Crédit du Maroc to the Holmarcom Group. A new visual identity was adopted by Crédit du Maroc following that change of ownership.

The International Bank of Tangier (BIT) and SIFIM are subsidiaries of the CDM Group.

== See also ==
- List of banks in Morocco
