= Adil Douiri =

Moroccan politician, businessman and venture capitalist

- عادل الدويري
- Born: November 16, 1963 (age 61); Rabat, Morocco
- Occupation(s): Politician, businessman, venture capitalist
- Known for: Former Minister of Tourism
- Term: 2002–2007
- Relatives: Fouad Douiri (cousin)

Adil Douiri (Arabic: عادل الدويري; born 16 November 1963 in Rabat) is a Moroccan politician, businessman and venture capitalist.

== Personal life ==
He is the son of Mhamed Douiri who was also a Minister and a daughter of Ahmed Balafrej. He is also the cousin of Fouad Douiri.

== Career ==
In 1992, he founded the Casablanca Finance Group. Between 2002 and 2007, he was the Minister of Tourism in the cabinet of Driss Jettou.

== See also ==
- Anis Birou
