= MADEX index =

Moroccan stock index

The MADEX index (Moroccan Most Active Shares Index) is a stock index that comprises most active shares listed continuously in the Casablanca Stock Exchange (Casablanca, Morocco) with variations closely linked to all the market serves as a reference for the listing of all funds invested in shares. It is one of two major indices of the Casablanca bourse, the other one being the MASI (Moroccan All Shares Index).

== See also ==
- MASI index
