= SORAS Group Limited =

Insurance services group

- Native name: Société Régionale d’Assurances
- Company type: Private
- Industry: Insurance, financial services
- Founded: 15 November 1984; 41 years ago
- Headquarters: Boulevard de la Révolution; Kigali, Rwanda
- Key people: Moranyi Charles chairman of the board
- Products: Insurance, real estate, banking holding
- Revenue: ▲RWF: 16.99 billion (2013)
- Net income: ▲RWF: 1.68 billion (2013)
- Total assets: ▲RWF: 43.58 billion (2013)
- Total equity: ▲RWF: 17.97 billion (2013)
- Parent: Sanlam
- Website: Homepage

SORAS Group Limited, commonly known as SORAS, is an insurance services group. It offers a wide range of financial products and services in insurance, property and banking in Rwanda.

== Overview ==
The SORAS Group's headquarters are located in Kigali, Rwanda. The group has subsidiaries in Rwanda and an associate in Burundi. SORAS was the first private insurance company to be registered and to operate in Rwanda.

SORAS Group is the largest insurance company in Rwanda with a market share of 35%.

== History ==
SORAS Group started its operations on 15 November 1984 as Société Rwandaise d’Assurances, as a subsidiary of Union des Assurances De Paris (UAP) International, to offer insurance services in Rwanda.

On 27 September 2010, the firm was transformed into a holding company with two subsidiaries i.e. SORAS Assurances Generales Limited and SORAS VIE Limited. To which it transferred its short and long term businesses to respectively. This was in order to comply with the Rwandan Law no 52/2008 of 10/09/2008 which obligated insurance companies to split short term and long term activities.

In 2012, as part of its regional expansion goal, SORAS Group acquired 33% of shares of an insurance company in Burundi, SOCAR SA. This new acquisition led to the change of the company's meaning, SORAS, from Société Rwandaise d’Assurances becoming Société Régionale d’Assurances. The name change was to reflect the group's status as a regional company.

During the financial year 2013, SORAS Group though its subsidiaries SORAS Assurances Generales Limited and SORAS VIE Limited lost its controlling stake in Agaseke Bank after major changes were made in the bank's shareholding structure. This led to a drop in SORAS Group's holding in the bank from 75% to 25%. The withdrawal from Agaseke bank was part of the Group's strategy of refocusing on its insurance business.

On 3 March 2014, Sanlam Emerging Markets a South African financial services group, announced that it had concluded an agreement to acquire 63% interest in Soras Group in a deal valued at USD 24.3 million. This acquisition was completed in June 2014 made SORAS part of a larger global group.

== Subsidiaries and investments ==
The companies that comprise the SORAS Group Limited include the following:

- SORAS Assurances Generales Limited – Kigali, Rwanda - 100% shareholding - founded in 2010. Offering short term and general insurance.
- SORAS VIE Limited – Kigali, Rwanda - 100% shareholding - founded in 2010. Offering life and long term insurance.
- Agaseke Bank – Kigali, Rwanda - 25% shareholding - a commercial bank in Rwanda, serving individuals and businesses, focusing mainly on SMEs. Held through SORAS Assurances Generales Limited and SORAS VIE Limited.
- SOCAR SA - Bujumbura, Burundi - 33% shareholding - founded in 1998. Offering insurance services in Burundi.

== Ownership ==
The stock of the group is privately held. As of 30 June 2014, the shareholding in SORAS Group is as depicted in the table below:

SORAS Group Limited

Rank	Name of owner	Percentage ownership
1	Sanlam Emerging Markets	63.00
2	Other local and international investors	27.00
	Total	100.00

== Governance ==
SORAS Group is governed by a five-person board of directors, with Moranyi Charles serving as the chairman of the group.

== See also ==
- Sanlam
- Agaseke Bank
