= Crédit Agricole du Maroc =

Bank in Morocco

Crédit agricole du Maroc
- Headquarters: Rabat, Morocco
- Website: creditagricole.ma

The Crédit Agricole du Maroc (CAM, Arabic: القرض الفلاحي للمغرب), known from 1961 to 2003 as Caisse Nationale du Crédit Agricole, is a public bank based in Rabat, Morocco.

== History ==
The CAM traces its origins to the dahir or Royal Decree of 1961 that established a National Agricultural Credit Bank (French: Caisse Nationale du Crédit Agricole, CNCA) inspired by the namesake French institution (est. 1920 and under that name since 1926), the national entity of the decentralized Crédit Agricole group. The next year, again as in France, regional entities were created under the generic name National Agricultural Credit Bank (French: Caisse Régionale du Crédit Agricole, CRCA). In 1968, these were complemented by more decentralized entities under the generic name Local Agricultural Credit Bank (French: Caisse Locale du Crédit Agricole, CLCA). In 1970, the local banks were allowed to collect savings.

In 2003, the CNCA was reorganized as a joint-stock company and renamed Crédit Agricole du Maroc, and acquired majority control of the distressed Banque Marocaine pour l'Afrique et l'Orient (BMAO).

In 2017, CAM created Al Akhdar Bank (AAB), an islamic finance affiliate.

== Ownership ==
As of late 2024, the CAM's ownership structure was as follows:

- Moroccan State: 75.2 percent
- Moroccan Agricultural Mutual Insurance (MAMDA): 7.4 percent
- Moroccan Central Mutual Insurance Company (MCMA): 7.4 percent
- Caisse de Dépôt et de Gestion: 10.0 percent

== See also ==
- List of banks in Morocco
