= Arthur Isiko =

Ugandan accountant and bank executive

- Born: Arthur Isiko; 1977 (age 48–49); Uganda
- Education: Makerere University (Bachelor of Commerce); University of Warwick (Master of Business Administration); Association of Chartered Certified Accountants (Fellow of Chartered Certified Accountants)
- Occupations: Accountant & bank executive
- Years active: 1996 - present
- Title: Managing Director & Chief Executive Officer; Bank of Africa in Uganda

Arthur Isiko is an accountant and bank executive in Uganda. He is the Managing Director and Chief Executive Officer of Bank of Africa in Uganda.

== Background and education ==
He was born at Mulago Hospital, Kampala, Uganda, in 1977. He studied commerce at Makerere University, graduating with a Bachelor of Commerce degree. He followed that with a Master of Business Administration degree obtained from the University of Warwick. Later, he obtained the title of Fellow of Chartered Certified Accountants from the Association of Chartered Certified Accountants of the United Kingdom.

== Career ==
He joined Bank of Africa - Uganda in 2003 as Head of Internal Audit. Later, he served as Head of Finance and then as Assistant General Manager in charge of the bank's back office operations. He was subsequently promoted to Executive Director. In 2015, he was appointed Managing Director, in which he had served in acting capacity since 2014. From 1999 until 2003, he worked at PricewaterhouseCoopers.

== See also ==
- List of banks in Uganda
- Banking in Uganda
