= List of banks in Morocco =

This is a list of commercial banks in Morocco, as published by the Bank Al-Maghrib in July 2021.

== List of commercial banks ==
- Al Barid Bank, state-owned
- Arab Bank PLC, part of Arab Bank Group
- Attijariwafa Bank
- Banco Sabadell, part of Banco Sabadell Group
- Bank Al-Amal, part-owned by BCP Group
- Banque Centrale Populaire, part of BCP Group
- Bank of Africa
- Banque Marocaine pour le Commerce et l'Industrie (BMCI), part of BNP Paribas Group
- Banque Populaire du Centre-Sud, part of BCP Group
- Banque Populaire de Fes-Meknès, part of BCP Group
- Banque Populaire de Laayoune, part of BCP Group
- Banque Populaire de Marrakech - Beni Mellal, part of BCP Group
- Banque Populaire de Nador - Al Hoceima, part of BCP Group
- Banque Populaire d'Oujda, part of BCP Group
- Banque Populaire de Rabat-Kénitra, part of BCP Group
- Banque Populaire de Tanger-Tétouan, part of BCP Group
- CDG Capital, part of the state-owned Caisse de Dépôt et de Gestion (CDG)
- Crédit Agricole du Maroc (CAM), state-owned
- CFG Bank
- Citibank Morocco, part of Citigroup
- CIH Bank, part of CDG
- Crédit du Maroc
- Fonds d'Équipement Communal (FEC), state-owned
- Mediafinance, part of BCP Group (later rebranded as BCP Securities Services)
- Saham Bank
- Union Marocaine de Banques (UMB), under temporary administration
- Caixa Bank, part of CaixaBank Group

== Islamic banks ==
These banks are referred to in Morocco as "participatory banks".

- Al Akhdar Bank (AAB), affiliated with Crédit Agricole du Maroc
- Bank Al Yousr
- Bank Al-Tamweel wa Al-Inma
- Bank As-Safa
- Umnia Bank

== African top banks ranking ==
Eight Moroccan banks featured in the Top 100 ranking of African banks by Tier 1 capital, published in 2025 by African Business:

Bank Name	Rank in Top 100	Location	Owner
Attijariwafa Bank	3	Casablanca	Al Mada (holding) - Morocco
BCP Group	6	Casablanca	Cooperative - Morocco
Bank of Africa	11	Casablanca	Othman Benjelloun - Morocco
Saham Bank	24	Casablanca	Saham Group
CIH Bank	28	Casablanca	Caisse de dépôt et de gestion - Morocco
Crédit Agricole du Maroc	31	Rabat	State of Morocco
Crédit du Maroc	37	Casablanca	Groupe Holmarcom - Morocco
BMCI	38	Casablanca	BNP Paribas - France
Fonds d'Équipement Communal	56	Casablanca	State of Morocco

== See also ==
- List of banks in the Arab world
- List of banks in Africa

== Resources ==
- Currency Exchange Practices at Moroccan Banks
