= BMCI =

Moroccan bank

- BMCI building in Casablanca
- Native name: Banque marocaine pour le commerce et l'industrie
- Type: Société anonyme
- Traded as: BSI
- ISIN: MA0000010811
- Industry: Financial services
- Founded: 1943
- Headquarters: 26 Place des Nations Unies, Casablanca, Morocco
- Key people: Mourad Cherif; Joël Sibrac; Hicham Seffa
- Total assets: approx. MAD 9.5 billion
- Owner: BNP Paribas
- Website: www.bmci.ma

The Banque Marocaine pour le Commerce et l'Industrie (BMCI, lit. 'Moroccan Bank for Commerce and Industry') is a bank in Morocco, headquartered in Casablanca. It is majority-owned subsidiary of Paris-based BNP Paribas (BNPP), and originates from the Moroccan operations of a predecessor of BNPP, the Banque Nationale pour le Commerce et l'Industrie (BNCI).

BMCI subsidiaries include Arval Morocco, BMCI Bourse, BMCI Finance, BMCI Leasing Auto, BMCI Gestion, BMCI Assurance, BMCI Crédit Conso, BMCI Banque Offshore, and BMCI NAJMA.

== History ==
In July 1940, facing challenging prospects at home following the German invasion of France, the Paris-based BNCI acquired the Banque de l'Union Nord-Africaine (BUNA) in Algiers to develop its activity outside Europe, renamed it Banque Nationale pour le Commerce et l'Industrie en Afrique (BNCI-A), and opened a branch in Casablanca. The Moroccan activity became a fully-fledged bank in 1943.

In 1950, BNCI-Afrique inaugurated a high-rise head office building on Casablanca's Place de France. French architect Alexandre Courtois had won the design competition in 1942, and moved to Casablanca in 1943 to oversee the construction works.

In 1964, the newly independent Moroccan government implemented a policy of marocanisation of the banking sector, aimed at shedding colonial legacies. In that context, BNCI renamed its Moroccan operations as BMCI, even though it retained ownership. BMCI listed on the Casablanca Stock Exchange in February 1972.

Meanwhile, the Banque de Paris et des Pays-Bas (BPPB) had started financing the Moroccan Sultanate in 1902, and from 1907 was the controlling shareholder of the State Bank of Morocco. It developed its activity through two major holding entities, the Compagnie générale du Maroc (Génaroc) and the Omnium Nord-Africain. In 1950 it opened its first branch in Casablanca, which in 1974 merged with operations of Banque Worms to form the Société Marocaine de Dépôt et de Crédit. These operations were absorbed by BMCI in 2000 following the merger of BNP (which had succeeded BNCI in 1966) with BPPB (then known as Paribas) to form BNP Paribas. In November 2001, BMCI also acquired ABN Amro Bank Maroc to consolidate its position in the Morocco financial services market.

As of December 2014, BNP Paribas retained 65.03 percent of BMCI's total equity. Other shareholders included AXA Assurance Maroc (9.11 percent), Sanad Assurance (5.84 percent), Atlanta Assurance (4.44 percent) and Holmarcom (2.41 percent).

In April 2026, BNP Paribas signed an agreement to sell its entire 67% controlling stake in BMCI) to Holmarcom. Completion of the transaction is expected during the fourth quarter of 2026, subject to obtaining the required regulatory approvals.

== See also ==
- List of banks in Morocco
