= Bank of Africa Uganda =

Ugandan commercial bank

Coordinates: 00°20′11″N 32°36′00″E

Bank of Africa Uganda Limited
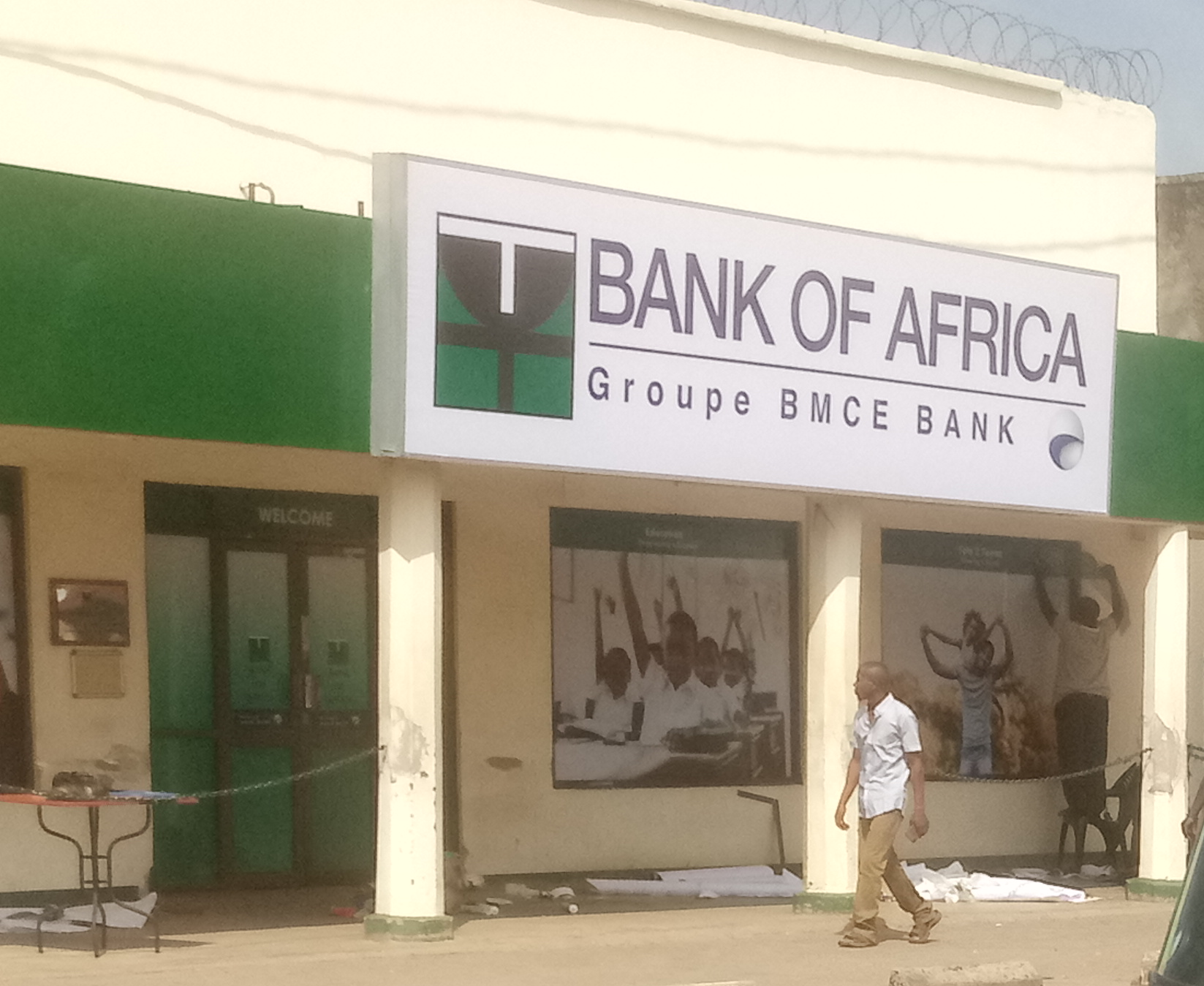
- Bank of Africa Uganda Arua cranch
- Type: Private: Subsidiary of Bank of Africa Group
- Industry: Financial services
- Founded: 1984; 42 years ago
- Headquarters: Lugogo One Building; 23 Lugogo Bypass; Kampala, Uganda
- Key people: George William Egaddu, chairman Arthur Isiko, managing director
- Products: Loans, savings, investments, debit cards, credit cards, mortgages
- Revenue: ▲Aftertax: UGX:11.638 billion (US$3.02 million) (H1 2023)
- Total assets: UGX:1,100 billion (US$285.5 million) (H1 2023)
- Number of employees: 700+ (2024)
- Website: boauganda.com

Bank of Africa Uganda Limited, also known as BOA Uganda (BOAU), is one of the commercial banks in Uganda that have been licensed by the Bank of Uganda, the country's central bank and national banking regulator.

== Location ==
The headquarters and main branch of Bank of Africa Uganda Limited are located at Lugogo One Building, 23 Lugogo Bypass, in the central business district of Kampala, Uganda's capital and largest city.

== Overview ==
BOA Uganda is involved in all aspects of commercial banking, although its focus is on providing banking services to multinational companies, mid-size local enterprises, and small retail businesses. As of June 2023, BOA Uganda was a medium-sized financial services provider, with total assets of UGX:1,100 billion (approximately US$285.5 million), with shareholders' equity of UGX:177.688 billion (approximately US$46.11 million).

== Bank of Africa Group ==
The bank is a member of the Bank of Africa Group, a multinational, Pan-African bank headquartered in Casablanca, Morocco, with presence in 20 countries. The group also maintains an office in Paris, France. As of December 2022, the group employed more than 6,500 employees and had a total asset base in excess of €10.2 billion.

== History ==
BOA Uganda started its operations in 1984 as Sembule Investment Bank (SIB). In 1996, SIB was purchased by Banque Belgolaise and the Netherlands Development Finance Company. The new owners renamed the bank Allied Bank. In October 2006, Banque Belgolaise sold its shares to investors that included the Bank of Africa (Kenya), Aureos East Africa Fund LLC, and Central Holdings (Uganda) Limited. The name of the bank was changed to Bank of Africa (Uganda) Limited.

== Ownership ==
The share ownership of BOA Uganda as of 31 December 2022 was as illustrated in the table below:

Bank of Africa stock ownership
Rank	Name of owner	Percentage ownership
1	Bank of Africa Group	47.41
2	Africa Financial Holdings-Indian Ocean of Mauritius	44.83
3	Central Holdings Uganda Limited	7.76
	Total	100.00

== Governance ==
The bank is supervised by a nine-person board of directors, chaired by George William Egaddu, a non-executive board member.

== Management team ==
In December 2010, Edigold Monday was appointed managing director of the bank. She became the first indigenous woman to rise to this level at a Ugandan commercial bank. In April 2014, Monday resigned. Arthur Isiko was appointed to replace her.

== Branch network ==
As of July 2026, the bank maintained branches in all regions of the country, including at the following locations:

- Main branch: One Lugogo Building, 3 Lugogo Bypass, Kampala
- Ndeeba branch: 1024 Masaka Road, Ndeeba
- Taxi Park branch: Mukwano Centre, 40-46 Ben Kiwanuka Street, Kampala
- Kampala Road branch: 48 Kampala Road, Kampala
- Ntinda branch: 49 Ntinda Road, Ntinda, Kampala
- Wandegeya branch: KM Plaza, 85 Bombo Road, Wandegeya, Kampala
- Entebbe branch: 16 Kampala Road, Entebbe
- Nakivubo branch: 15 Nakivubo Road, Kampala
- Mukono branch: 13 Kampala Road, Mukono
- Kabalagala branch: 559 Ggaba Road, Kabalagala, Kampala
- Oasis branch: Oasis Mall, 88-94 Yusuf Lule Road, Kampala
- Jinja Main branch: 1 Main Street, Jinja
- Clive Road branch: 18 Clive Road East, Jinja
- Arua branch: 19 Avenue Road, Arua
- Lira branch: 1A Balla Road, Lira
- Mbarara branch: 1 Mbaguta Road, Mbarara
- Mbale branch: 26 Cathedral Avenue, Mbale
- Fort Portal branch: 14 Bwamba Road, Fort Portal
- Gulu branch: 11 Awere Road, Gulu
- Kololo branch: 9 Cooper Road, Kisementi, Kololo, Kampala
- Kawempe branch: 125 Bombo Road, Kawempe, Kampala
- Nansana branch: 5390 Nansana Town Centre, Nansana
- Luzira branch: 1329/1330 Port Bell Road, Luzira, Kampala
- Hoima branch: 13 Wright Road, Hoima
- Nateete branch: 1-2 Old Masaka Road, Nateete, Kampala
- Patongo branch: 33 Dollo Road, Patongo
- Bbira mini branch: 2731 Mityana Road, Bbira, Wakiso District
- Namasuba branch: Freedom City Mall, 4010 Entebbe Road, Namasuba, Kampala
- Kalongo mini branch: 16 Patongo Road Kalongo
- Business centre: 9 Kittante Road, Kampala
- Rwenzori mini branch: Rwenzori House, 1 Lumumba Avenue, Nakasero, Kampala
- Masaka branch: 7 Birch Avenue, Masaka
- Rubirizi branch: Mbarara-Kasese Highway, Rubirizi

In addition to the brick-and-mortar branches, the bank has a mobile banking vehicle covering nine districts and key trading centres in the districts of Lira, Pader, Oyam, Lira, Kole, Apac, Dokolo, Kaberamaido, Alebtong, and Otuke.

== See also ==
- List of banks in Uganda
- Banking in Uganda
- Bank of Africa Kenya Limited
- Bank of Africa Rwanda Limited
- Bank of Africa Ghana Limited
