= Moulay Hafid Elalamy =

Moroccan businessman and politician (born 1960)

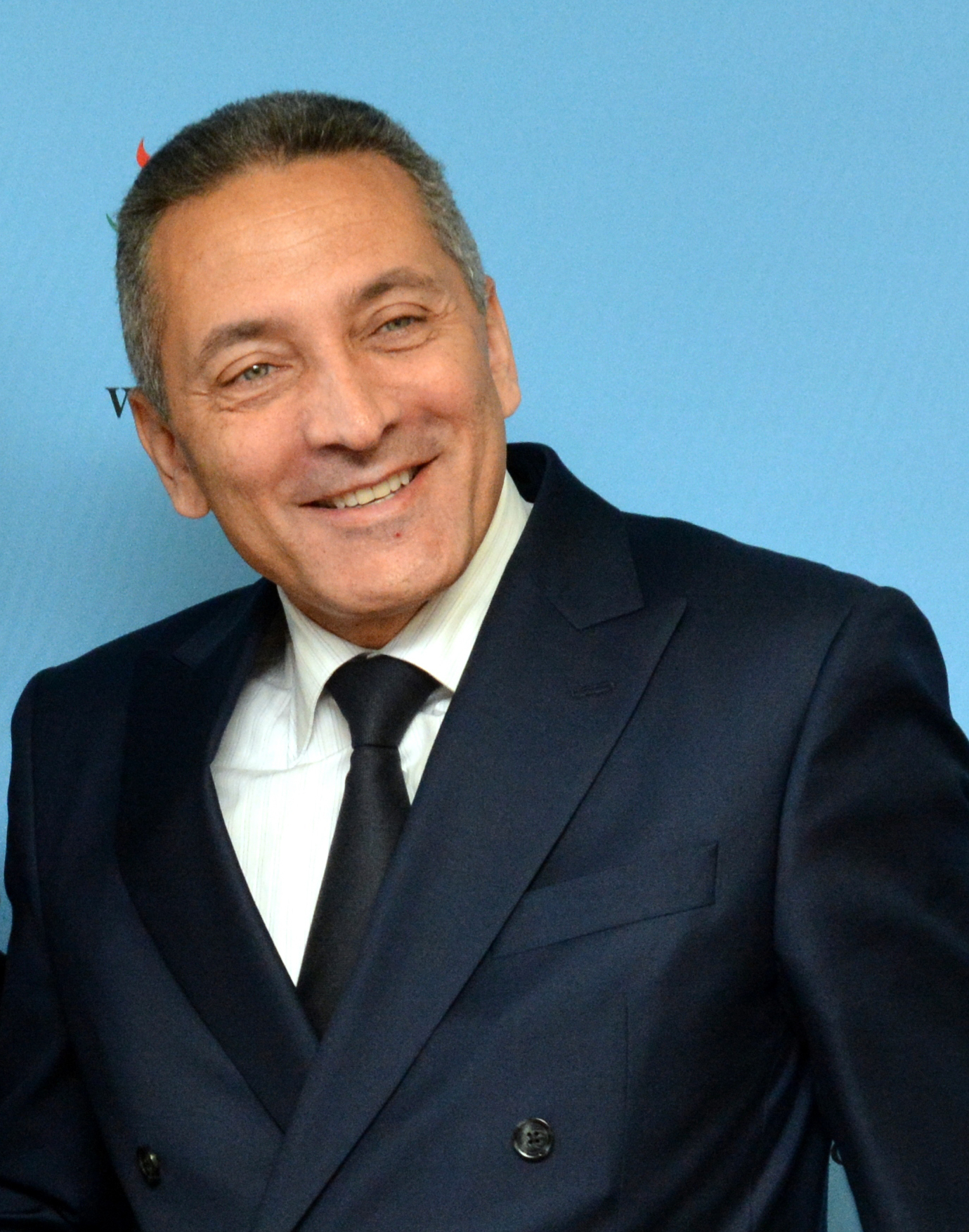
- Moulay Hafid in 2014

Minister of Industry and Trade
- In office October 2013 – October 2021
- Monarch: Mohammed VI
- Prime Minister: Abdelilah Benkirane; Saad-Eddine El Othmani
- Preceded by: Abdelkader Aamara
- Succeeded by: Ryad Mezzour

Personal details
- Born: January 13, 1960 (age 66) Marrakesh, Morocco
- Party: RNI
- Education: Université de Sherbrooke
- Occupation: Chairmain of Teleperformance; Chairman of Saham Bank; Executive Board member of ICC

Moulay Hafid Elalamy (born January 13, 1960) is a Moroccan businessman and politician. He is the founder and owner of the Saham Group. He served as the Minister of Industry, Trade, & New Technologies until 2021.

== Early life ==
Moulay Hafid Elalamy was born on January 13, 1960, in Marrakesh, Morocco. He graduated from the Université de Sherbrooke in Sherbrooke, Quebec.

== Career ==
Elalamy is the founder and owner of the Saham Group. Its subsidiary, CNIA Saada, is the largest insurance company in Morocco. Other subsidiaries include call centers, and clinics.

He served as the Minister of Industry, Trade, & New Technologies until 2021.

As of 2014, he was worth an estimated US $620 million according to Forbes.

Elalamy was the chairman of Morocco's bid for the 2026 FIFA World Cup but lost out to Canada/Mexico/United States on June 13, 2018, in Moscow by 69 votes with 134-65.

In media, Elalamy is majority shareholder of the Moroccan history magazine Zamane, and the newspaper Les Echos.

== Personal life ==
He is married. He resides in Casablanca, Morocco.

On September 15, 2023, Elalamy donated $1.9 Million to Earthquake Fund after an earthquake with a magnitude of 6.8 M_{w} hit Marrakesh-Safi region of Morocco.
