= Rwanda Mountain Tea =

African tea company

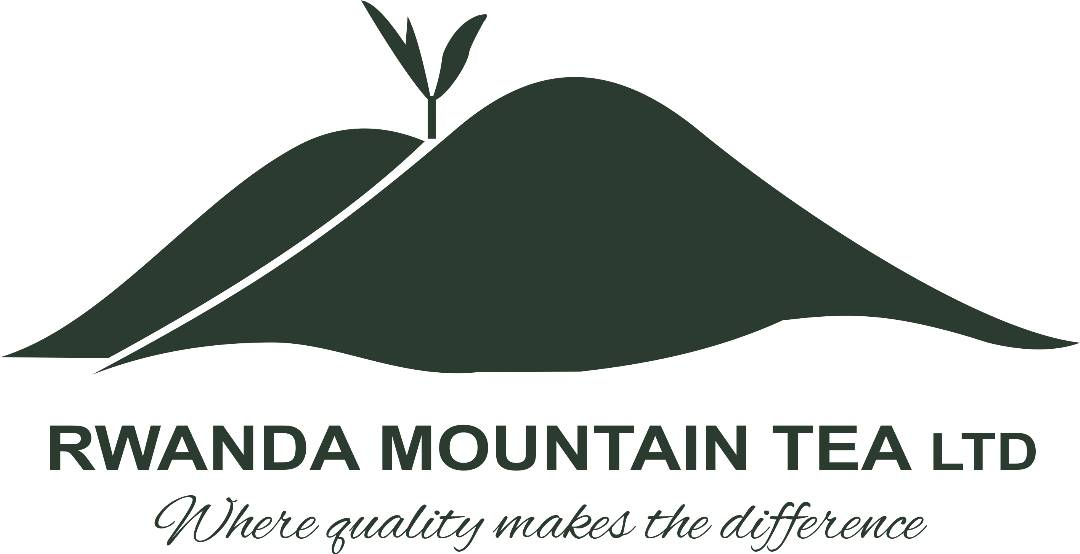

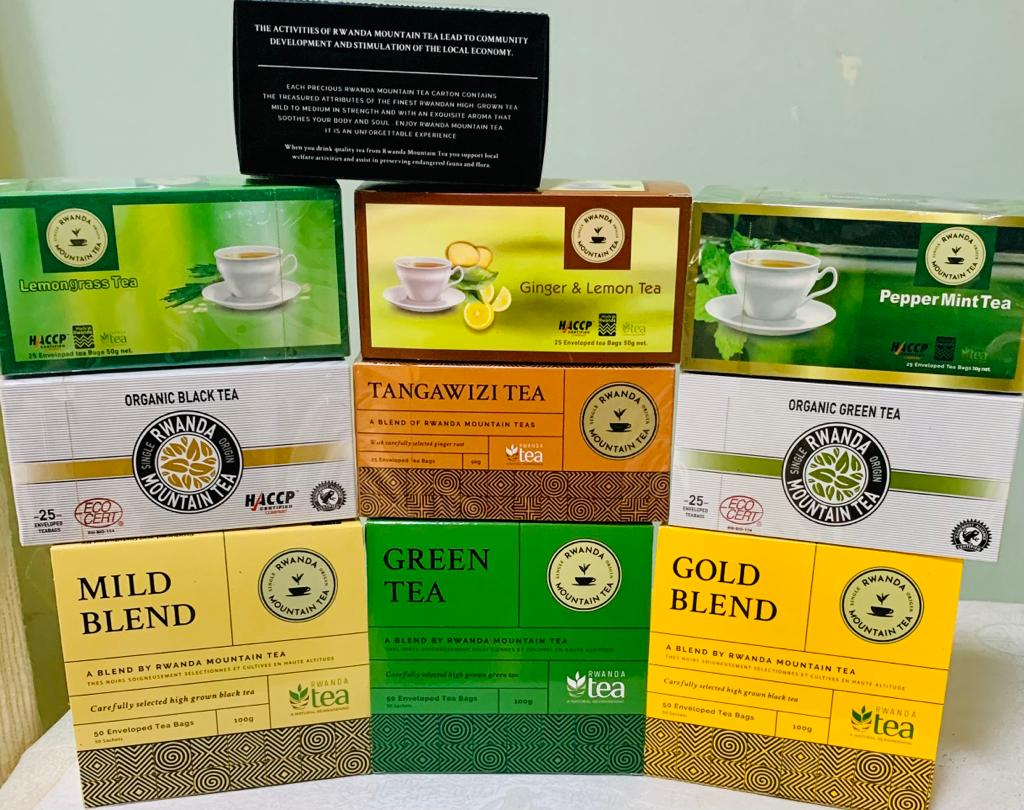
- Headquarters: Kigali, Rwanda
- Number of employees: 13000 - 18000
- Website: Official website

Rwanda Mountain Tea Limited is a privately owned holding company established in 2005, primarily engaged in tea production and the strategic management of several tea factories under its ownership. Through its subsidiary, the Tea Invest Company (“TIC”). In addition to tea, the company has diversified into other sectors including hydropower generation and the fabrication of concrete material.

== Description ==
Rwanda Mountain Tea Ltd is situated in Rwanda's north western region and stretches down to southwestern region. The company was established in 2005 and started investing in tea factories and plantations. In 2006 they had acquired majority shares in a number of government-owned tea estates. In addition to growing their efforts in the industry, they set up a tea factory at Rutsiro (Western region to produce tea. Today it is classified amongst the top 5 exporters of tea in Rwanda.

The company manufactures and trades in organic black tea CTC and Green Orthodox Tea from their Rutsiro Tea factory which is organic certified as per European (EOS) and American (NOP) Organic standards.

Rwanda Mountain Tea as 2 hydro power plants along the Giciye River which supplies about 8 mega watts of electricity to the national grid.

== Awards and recognition ==
Rwanda Mountain Tea Ltd has been recognised and awarded different accolades for their contribution to the tea industry in Rwanda.

- Awarded 1st prize for the BP1 (Kitabi) at the Gold Medal Tea Competition in 2015 organized by the Tea Associations of the USA and Canada.
- Awarded 2nd prize for the PF1 (Kitabi)at the Gold Medal Tea Competition in 2015 organized by the Tea Associations of the USA and Canada.
- Awarded over all winner at the fourth Africa Tea Convention and Exhibition in 2019.

== See also ==
List of companies of Rwanda
