= Compagnie générale du Maroc =

Financial holding company

The Compagnie générale du Maroc (General Company of Morocco), known as "Genaroc", is a French financial holding company founded in February 1912 by a consortium of French banks headed by the Bank of Paris and the Netherlands.

In 1914, it teamed with fr:Lyonnaise des Eaux to create the Moroccan Society of Distribution of Water, Gas and Electricity (SMD).

It then took part in the creation of the fr:Compagnie des chemins de fer du Maroc (Railway Company of Morocco), and it became one of the two main shareholders of the fr:Compagnie franco-espagnole du chemin de fer de Tanger à Fès (Franco-Spanish Company of the Tangier Railway in Fez).
