= Bank of Africa Red Sea =

Bank of Africa (Red Sea)
- Company type: Subsidiary
- Industry: Banking
- Predecessor: Banque Indosuez Mer Rouge
- Founded: 1908; 117 years ago
- Headquarters: Place Lagarde, Djibouti (city), Djibouti
- Parent: Bank of Africa Group
- Website: www.boamerrouge.com

Bank of Africa Red Sea is the second largest bank in Djibouti and is part of the Bank of Africa (BOA) Group. Bank of Africa Group, by then based in Mali, acquired Djibouti-based Banque Indosuez Mer Rouge in 2010. BOA Red Sea operates seven branches in Djibouti and a representative office in Addis Ababa.

== History ==
In 1907, the Banque de l'Indochine started issuing banknotes for Djibouti, and in 1908 established a branch there. The bank had just received the French government concession to create the Franco-Ethiopian Railway between Djibouti and Addis Ababa (Ethiopia).

It had a monopoly on banking services in Djibouti until the arrival in 1954 of the Banque pour le Commerce et l'Industrie - Mer Rouge (BCIMR), a subsidiary of Paris-based Banque Nationale pour le Commerce et l'Industrie. The two banks' headquarters stood together at Place Lagarde for nearly half a century.

In 1974, the Banque de l'Indochine merged with Banque de Suez to form Banque Indosuez, and the operation in Djibouti became Banque Indosuez Mer Rouge (BIMR). BIMR became a wholly owned subsidiary of the French bank Crédit Agricole Indosuez when the Crédit Agricole banking group acquired Banque Indosuez in 1996.

In August 2010 the BOA Group initiated negotiations to acquire BIMR that came to fruition in on 22 December 2010, following which the bank was renamed Bank of Africa Red Sea.
