= Banque Indosuez =

French bank

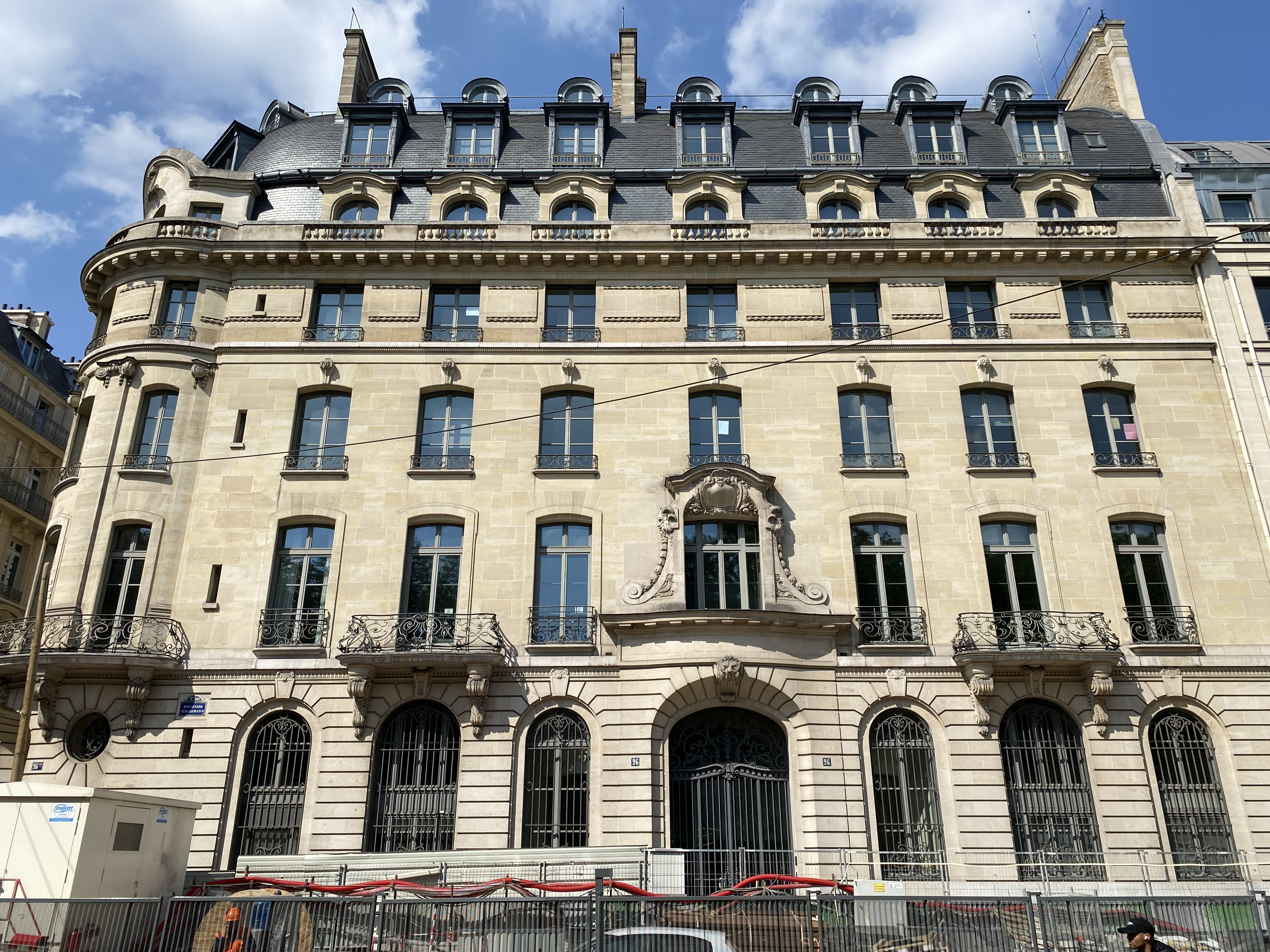
Former headquarters of Banque Indosuez at 96 boulevard Haussmann, Paris

Banque Indosuez was a French bank, the product of the 1975 merger of Banque de l'Indochine and Banque de Suez et de l'Union des mines. It was purchased by Crédit Agricole in 1996, and formed the core of what is now Crédit Agricole Corporate and Investment Bank. As of 2022, its brand survives in Indosuez Wealth Management, the Crédit Agricole group's wealth management arm.

== History ==
In 1966, to prevent an outright takeover of military-industrial concern Schneider by Belgium's Empain group, the Banque de l'Indochine acquired 10 percent of Schneider's capital. As a consequence of that transaction, Empain took 11 percent of the bank's own capital. Its chairman François de Flers then attempted to counter Empain's influence in the bank (as the rest of the shareholder base was highly dispersed) by inviting the Compagnie Financière de Suez, with which the bank had several common business interests, to invest in it as well. In January 1967, Suez acquired 7 percent of the bank's capital, the same amount as held by Empain by then. De Flers subsequently invited La Paternelle, an insurer, to acquire a further 4 percent of the bank's capital, thus consolidating a group of friendly shareholders. In late 1969, the Assurances du groupe de Paris (AGP), a holding company that had been formed in the meantime and owned La Paternelle, owned 22 percent of the Banque de l'Indochine, and by 1972, 45 percent. AGP subsequently sold its stake to the Compagnie Financière de Suez. In 1975, the latter merged the Banque de l'Indochine with its subsidiary the Banque de Suez et de l'Union des Mines, to form Banque Indosuez.

Banque Indosuez was nationalized, together with its longstanding rival Paribas, by the government led by Pierre Mauroy under President François Mitterrand. It was then privatized in 1986 by the government led by Jacques Chirac. A decade later in 1996, it was purchased by Crédit Agricole and renamed Crédit Agricole Indosuez in 1997, incorporating Crédit Agricole's international and market activities.

== Indosuez Wealth Management ==
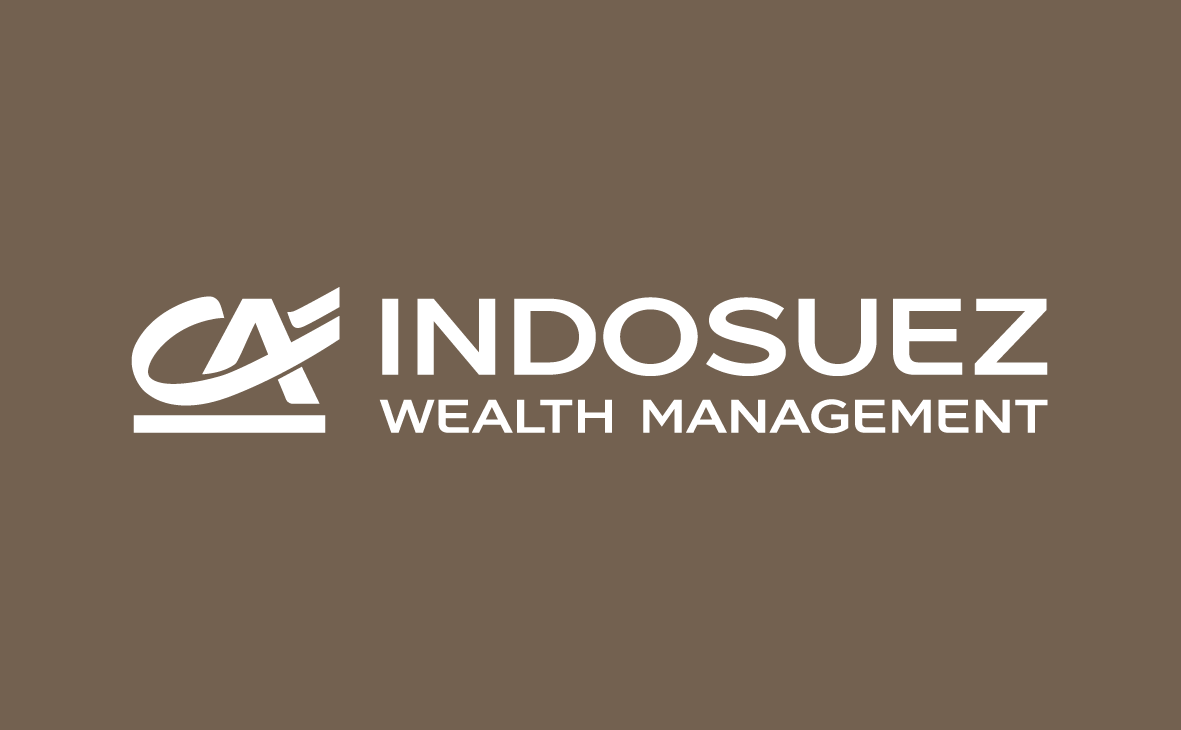
Logo of Indosuez Wealth Management

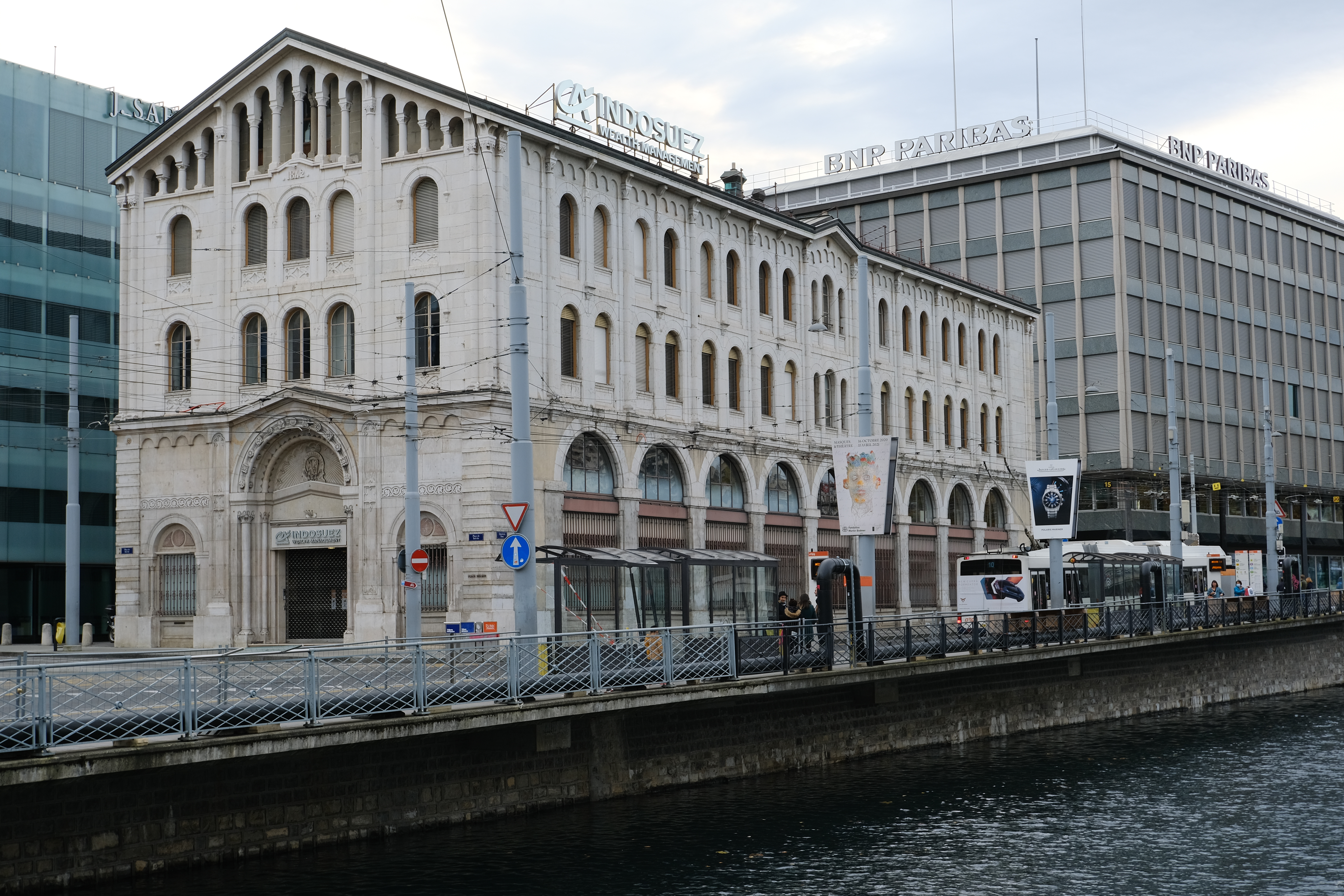
Former Crédit Lyonnais building, now offices of Indosuez Wealth Management in Geneva

Indosuez Wealth Management is the wealth management arm of the Crédit Agricole group and perpetuates the Indosuez brand, even though it covers a much narrower market segment than Banque Indosuez used to. It is headquartered at 17 rue du Docteur Lancereaux in Paris and has offices in several financial centers, including in Geneva.

== Overseas developments ==
In Vanuatu, Indosuez incorporated its branches in 1978 to form Banque Indosuez Vanuatu (BIV). The government of Vanuatu took a 20% stake in BIV in 1983 as BIV was performing a number of central banking functions, though it was not the monetary authority. In 1993, Bank of Hawaii acquired Banque Indosuez's operations in Vanuatu to form Banque d’Hawaii (Vanuatu). Bank of Hawaii sold these operations to Australia and New Zealand Banking Group in 2001.

In 1982, following Indosuez's nationalization, the Malaysian activities were reorganized as the Malaysian-French Bank. These were acquired by Multi-Purpose Capital Holdings Berhad in 1987, and renamed Alliance Bank Malaysia Berhad in 2001 after merger with six other banking institutions in Malaysia.

In 1983 the government of Papua New Guinea invited foreign banks to open affiliates on condition that the foreign parent could only own 49 percent. However, it agreed that Bank of Papua New Guinea (BPNG; the central bank) would buy that portion of the remaining shares that local investors did not take up. Banque Indosuez established Banque Indosuez Niugini—49 percent Indosuez, 41.5 percent BPNG, and the remainder public. In 1997, Bank of Hawaii purchased Banque Indosuez Nuigini Ltd in Papua New Guinea from Banque Indosuez and renamed it Bank of Hawaii (PNG) Ltd.

In 1989, Banque Indosuez closed its branch at Mata-Utu in Wallis and Futuna.

Westpac acquired Banque de Polynésie in 1990, when Indosuez was divesting itself of almost all of its overseas retail banking operations. In New Caledonia, Westpac also acquired the operations of Banque Indosuez in 1990, but sold them in 1998 to Société Générale Calédonienne de Banque, a subsidiary of Société Générale.

The activity in Djibouti became Banque Indosuez Mer Rouge and later Bank of Africa (Red Sea), the second largest bank in Djibouti.

== See also ==
- Paribas
- List of banks in France
