= National Post Office (Rwanda) =

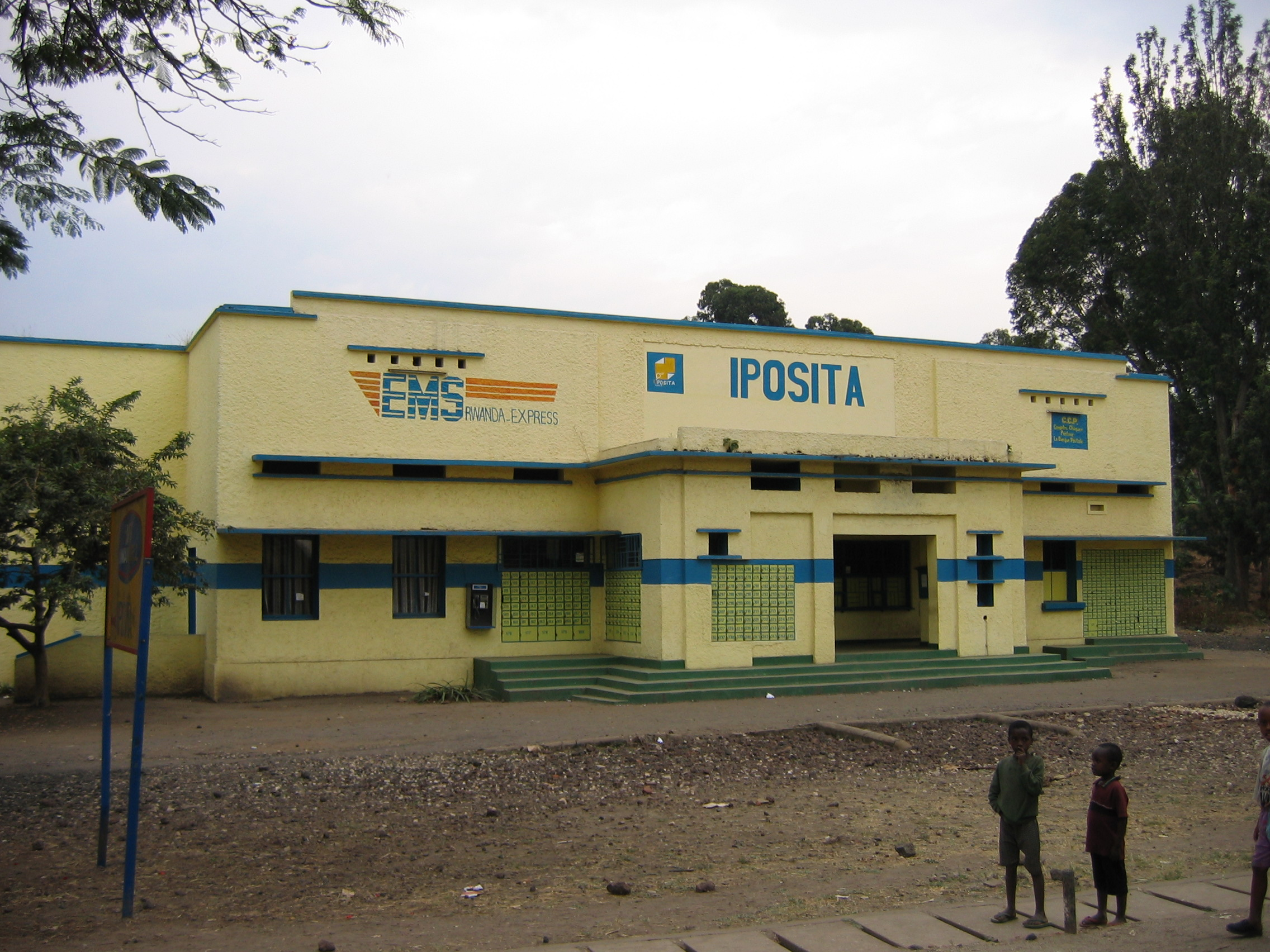
The local post office at Gisenyi in North-West Rwanda

The National Post Office (French: Office national des postes, Kinyarwanda: iPosita Rwanda) is the company responsible for the postal service in Rwanda. As of 2009, the Director General of National Post Office was Celestin Kayitare.

Rwanda is part of the Universal Postal Union, which recommends a maximum of 9,000 people per one post office branch. As of 2009, Rwanda's population is around ten million, and would need 1,111 post office branches to meet this recommendation. As of 2009, Rwanda had nineteen post office branches.

During April 2010, the Office National des Postes announced, through the Universal Postal Union, that several fraudulent issues of stamps were circulating.

== Illegal competitors ==
The Office National Des Postes was granted a monopoly for thirty years in 1992 by the Parliament of Rwanda, then known as the National Development Council. Private services do business in the country despite the government's protests. Atraco, Sotra Tours, Okapi, Virunga, and Muhabura Bus have been named by the postal service as companies operating illegally. As of October 2009, a law was being drafted to crack down on illegal courier services.

== International monetary fund ==
A November 2000 report by the International Monetary Fund (IMF) on reducing poverty in Rwanda stated the IMF would try to make the Office National Des Postes financially self-supporting, while also providing affordable services. According to the report, this would improve the communication structure, allowing those living in poverty to more easily find jobs. As part of a November 2000 agreement over aid with the IMF, the Rwandian government agreed to make the Office National Des Postes self-sufficient by September 2001.

== See also ==
- Communications in Rwanda
- Postage stamps and postal history of Rwanda
