= Great Lakes Energy =

- Company type: Private
- Founded: March 21, 2002
- Headquarters: Kigali, {{{location_country}}}
- Area served: Rwanda
- Founder: Sam Dargan
- Industry: Energy
- Commercial: Yes
- Current status: Active

Great Lakes Energy is a Solar EPC company founded by Sam Dargan in 2005. The company is headquartered in Kigali, Rwanda and primarily serves the East African market. The company is specialized in on-grid and off-grid solar energy systems. For the past decade, the company has helped solve energy challenges of those in East Africa. The company provides non-governmental organizations, hospitals, and schools with optimized photovoltaic systems. The company has specialized in retrofitting existing off-grid PV solar system designs with optimized versions. In the past, the company has also provided jobs for training local Rwandans on how to engineer and install these systems. The company also has provided training to other social entrepreneurs learning to operate in Africa.

Great Lakes Energy became the distributor for Sun King lamps by Green Light Energy in 2013 allowing it to provide lighting solutions for rural households in Rwanda.

In 2014, Great Lakes Energy partnered with Global Bright Light Foundation to distribute sun king lamps to refugees in the UNHCR Kiziba refugee camp in Rwanda.

In 2016, Great Lakes Energy became the official distributor of Victron Energy.

== Health clinics powered by GLE ==
- Gikomero
- Mukuyu
- Nyange
- Nyarugenge HC
- Massoro HC

== C&I scale done by GLE ==
- 283KWp at KTF concept, Bujumbura-Burundi
- 100KWp at Norrsken Kigali House
- 60KWp at Hope Haven School
- 100KWp re-install at King Faisal Hospital
- 35KWp at the Retreat

== See also ==
- Solar power in Africa
- Energy in Rwanda
- Off-the-grid
- Renewable energy in Africa
