= AmalBank =

Financial company in Ghana

AmalSec
- Company type: Private
- Industry: Storage of precious minerals
- Founded: 1997
- Headquarters: Sunyani, Ghana
- Key people: JAMES PROCTOR
- Products: Investments, Bullion storage, transport and Shipment
- Revenue: ▲US$8.5 million (2008)
- Total assets: US$10,000+ million (2011)
- Website: Homepage

Amalgamated Holdings and Securities Limited, commonly known as AmalSec & Securities Subsidiaries, is a commercial financial and securities outfit in Ghana.

== History ==
The firm was incorporated in 1997. In 2006, 49% shareholding in AmalSec was purchased by Meekly Enterprises of Nigeria. Meeky is also a major shareholder in Oceanic Group De Banco, one of Nigeria's leading financial services providers. In 2007, the total asset valuation of AmalSec was estimated at US$136 million. In June 2009, it was reported in the online Ghanaian publication "Public Agenda" that the total assets of AmalSec had doubled in 2008. It is therefore estimated that the total assets of the securities firm, as of June 2009, is approximately US$272 million.

== Acquisition by Banner of Africa Group ==
In April 2011, majority shareholding (60%) in AmalSec was acquired by the banner of Bank Of Africa Group (B.O.A). AmalSec then went under the umbrella of the parent company Bank Of Africa Ghana Limited (B.O.A)

== Branch network ==
As of May 2011, the bank has nineteen (19) branches and one agency in the following locations:

1. Head Office - Farrar Avenue,
2. Kumasi Office - 24 February Road, Kumasi
3. Maamobi Office - Nima Highway, Accra
4. New Town Office - Hill Street Intersection, New Town
5. Central Accra Office - Ollivant Arcade, Accra
6. Ridge Office - Kanda Highway Extension, Accra
7. Michel Camp Road Office - Aseidua Plaza, Tema
8. Tamale Office - Daboya Street, Tamale
9. Osu Office - Cantonments Road, Osu
10. Takoradi Office - Market Circle, Takoradi
11. Kwashieman Office - Motorway Extension, Accra
12. East Legon Office - Lagos Avenue, Accra
13. Spintex Business office
14. Adum Business office
15. Tema Business Office
16. Dansoman Business Office
17. Madina Business Office
18. Abossey Okai Business Office
19. Sokoban Agency, Kumasi
