= Bank of Africa Tanzania =

Tanzanian commercial bank

Coordinates: 06°49′03″S 39°17′31″E

Bank of Africa Tanzania Limited
- Type: Private
- Industry: Financial services
- Founded: 2007; 19 years ago
- Headquarters: NDC Development House, Ohio Street, Dar es Salaam, Tanzania
- Key people: Nehemiah Kyando Mchechu (chairperson); Adam Charles Mihayo (managing director)
- Products: Loans, savings, investments, debit cards, credit cards, mortgages
- Total assets: TSh 564 billion (US$245.4 million) (2019)
- Website: boatanzania.com

Bank of Africa Tanzania Limited, also known as BOA Tanzania (BOAT), is one of the commercial banks in Tanzania that have been licensed by the Bank of Tanzania, the country's central bank and national banking regulator.

== Location ==
The headquarters and main branch of Bank of Africa Tanzania Limited, are located at National Development Corporation House, Ohio Street, at the corner with Kivukoni Road, in the central business district of Dar es Salaam, Tanzania's business capital and largest city. The geographical coordinates of the bank's headquarters are: 6°49'03.0"S, 39°17'31.0"E (Latitude:-6.817500; Longitude:39.291944).

== Overview ==
BOA Tanzania is a retail commercial bank that provides services to multinational companies, mid-size local enterprises, and small retail businesses. As of December 2019, BOA Tanzania was a medium-sized financial services provider, with total assets of TSh 564 billion (approximately US$245.4 million), with customer deposits totalling TSh 390 billion (approximately US$169.7 million).

== Bank of Africa Group ==
The bank is a member of the Bank of Africa Group, a multinational, Pan African bank headquartered in Bamako, Mali, with presence in 18 countries, across a network of 16 commercial banks, one financial corporation, one banque de l’habitat, one brokerage firm, two investment companies, one asset management company and one group representative office in Paris. As of December 2018, the group's total assets were valued at €7.62 billion (US$8.24 billion).

== History ==
BOA Tanzania started its operations in June 2007, when Bank of Africa Group acquired Euroafrican Bank Tanzania, which had been operational since 1995.

== Governance ==
The bank is supervised by a board of directors, chaired by Nehemiah Kyando Mchechu, a non-executive board member. The managing director and chief executive officer of the bank is Adam Charles Mihayo.

== Branch network ==
As of December 2019, the bank maintained 27 networked branches, including 13 branches in Dar es Salaam, 13 branches in other Tanzanian cities and towns and one Business Centre in Dar es Salaam.

== See also ==
- List of banks in Tanzania
