= The Octagon, Accra =

Building in Accra, Ghana

The Octagon
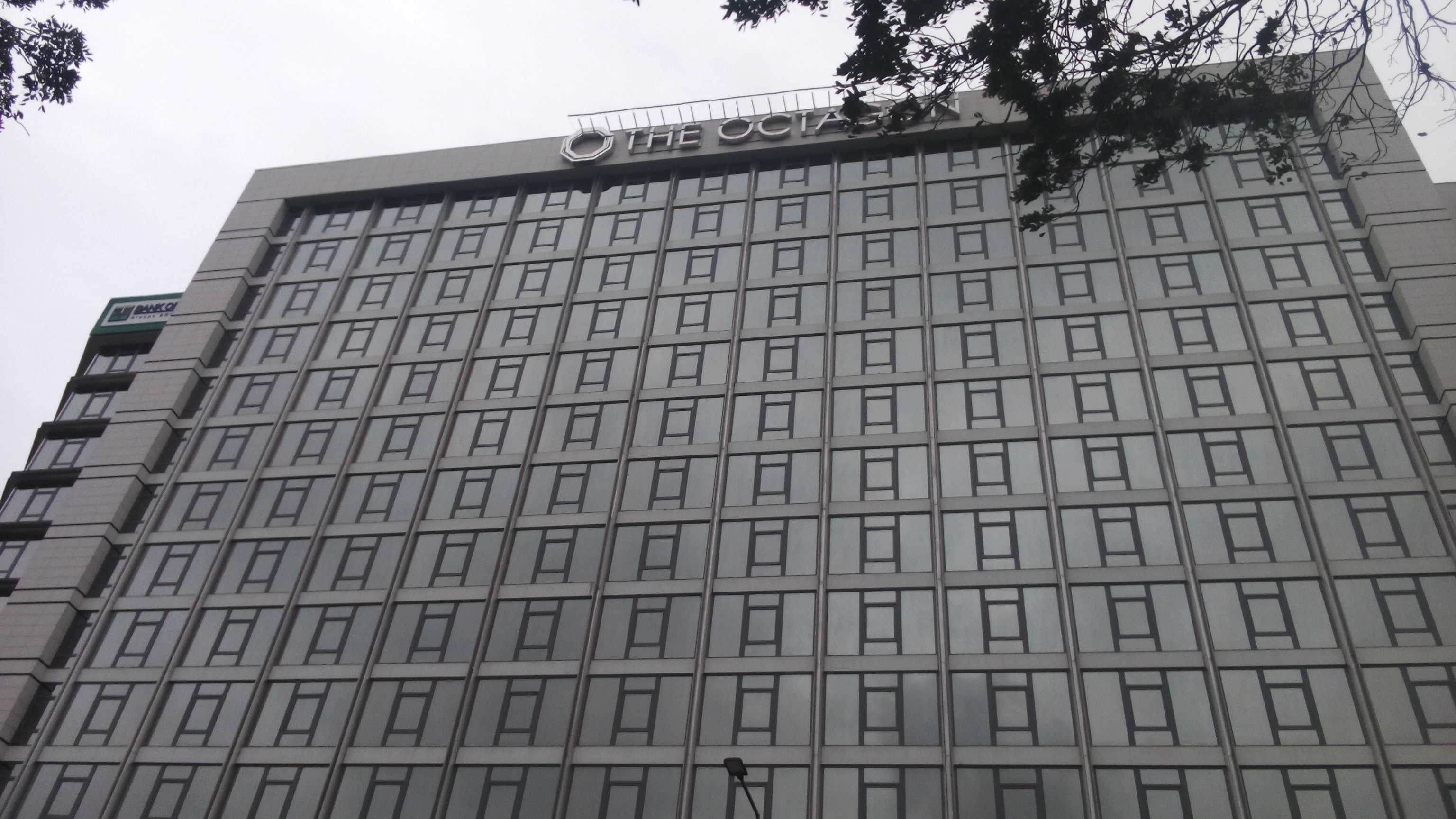

- Location within Ghana

General information
- Location: Accra, Ghana
- Coordinates: 5°33′08″N 0°12′13″W
- Opened: c. 2013
- Owner: Dream Reality Company Limited

Technical details
- Floor area: 75,000 m^{2} (810,000 sq ft)

Website
- www.dreamrealty.com.gh

The Octagon is a business and retail center in Accra, Ghana. The building complex offers ca. 75,000 m^{2} usable area for luxury offices and retail, and inclusively a five-star hotel. Opened in 2013, it is located in Tudu, a suburb of Accra on an area closed by the Independence Avenue and the Barnes Road, northern of the Kinbu Gardens.
