= Water Consulting East Africa =

Multidisciplinary consultancy with headquarters in Kigali

Water Consulting East Africa Ltd
- Type: Private
- Industry: Multidisciplinary consultancy
- Founded: 2014
- Founder: Jean-Paul Skoczylas
- Headquarters: Kigali, Kigali City, Rwanda
- Area served: Rwanda, East and Central Africa
- Key people: Jean-Paul Skoczylas, Managing Director; Jason Lorenzetti, Principal Environmental Engineer
- Website: http://www.waterconsultingea.com

Water Consulting East Africa (WC EA) is a multidisciplinary consultancy with headquarters in Kigali, Rwanda. It provides water and civil engineering, management and construction services in Rwanda East Africa and further afield. WC EA is East Africa’s premier water engineering consultancy.

It was established in 2014 by the founder Jean-Paul Skoczylas. WC EA has provided services to Bechtel Corporation, USAID, UNICEF, IFC, Rwanda Cricket Stadium Foundation and Howard G. Buffet Foundation and on projects funded by DFID and the Bill & Melinda Gates Foundation.

== History ==
Water Consulting East Africa was formed in 2014 to primarily serve the water and civil engineering market in Rwanda, East and Central Africa

== Operations ==
Water Consulting East Africa has experience of working in Rwanda and the Democratic Republic of Congo. WC EA's key employees have experience of working across North America, Europe, Middle East and Africa.

== Projects ==
- Rugari Water Supply, DRC – Virunga National Park/Howard G Buffet Foundation
- Private Sector Agriculture Development, Rwanda - IF
- Nasho II Irrigation Project, Rwanda – Rwandan Ministry of Agriculture/Howard G Buffet Foundation
- Rwandan Water Sector Study, Rwanda - USAID
- CBEHPP National Action Plan, Rwanda - UNICEF
- Rwanda Cricket Stadium Water Supply, Rwanda - RCSF
- Cactus Green Park, Rwanda - FONERWA
- CHAN 2016, Bechtel - Rwanda
