= Fouad Douiri =

Moroccan politician

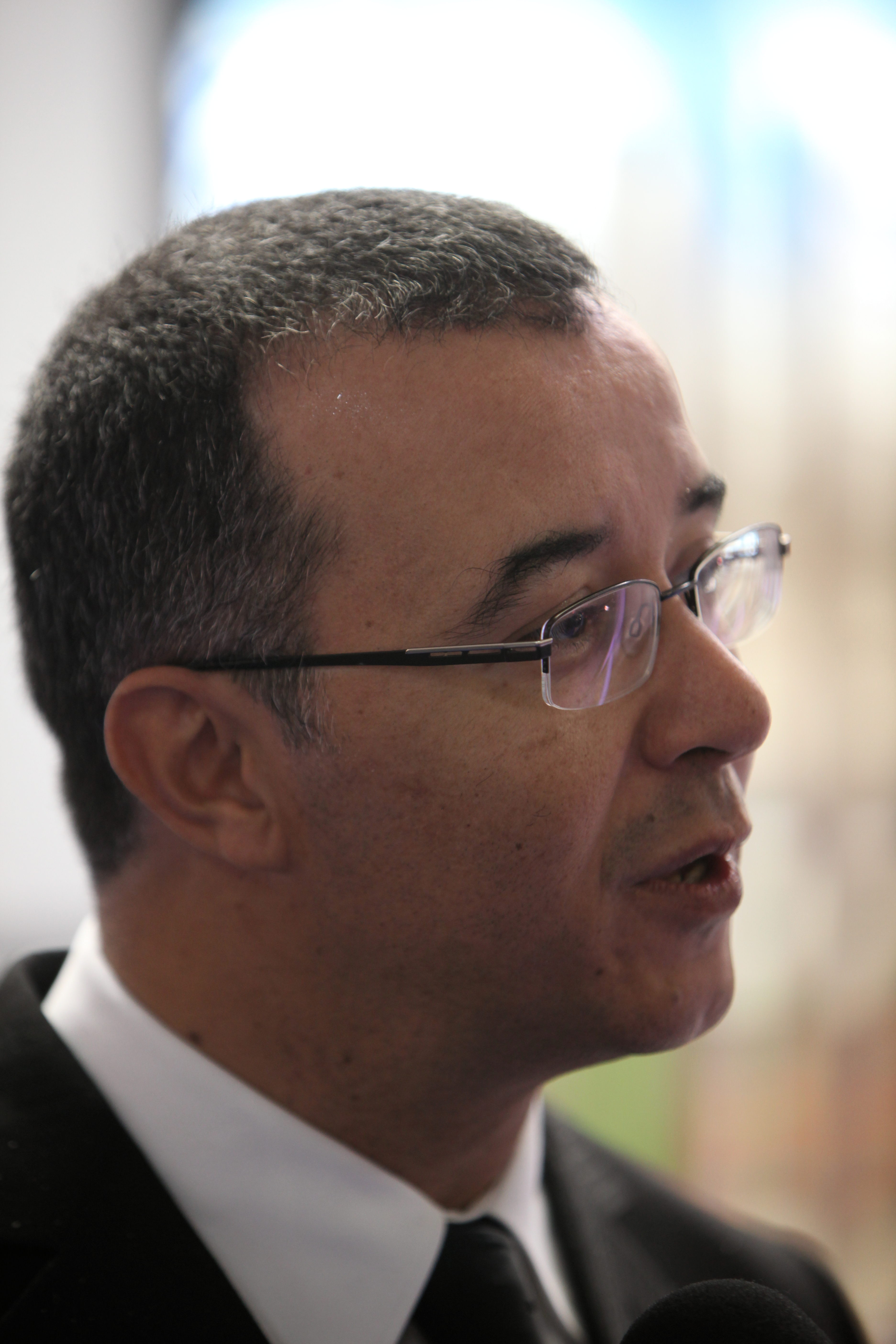

Minister of Energy, Mines, Water and Environment
- In office 3 January 2012 – 9 July 2013
- Monarch: Mohammed VI
- Prime Minister: Abdelilah Benkirane
- Preceded by: Amina Benkhadra
- Succeeded by: vacant

Personal details
- Born: 1960 (age 65–66) Fes, Morocco
- Party: Istiqlal
- Occupation: Politician

Fouad Douiri (Arabic: فؤاد الدويري; born 1960 in Fes) is a Moroccan politician of the Istiqlal Party. He was Minister of Energy, Mines, Water and Environment in Abdelilah Benkirane's cabinet.

== Professional life ==
Before accessing a ministerial portfolio, Douiri held the position of "Président du Directoire" in RMA-Watanya, the insurance division of Othman Benjelloun's financial holding company. In April 2013, while King Mohammed VI was on vacation in France, Hamid Chabat Secretary-General of the Istiqlal Party announced his intentions to leave the coalition that forms the cabinet of Abdelilah Benkirane. Consequently, a resignation request was submitted on 9 July 2013 for all the Party's ministers.

== See also ==
- Cabinet of Morocco
