= Bank of Africa Rwanda =

Bank of Rwanda

Bank of Africa Rwanda Limited
- Type: Private
- Industry: Financial services
- Founded: 2003
- Headquarters: Kigali, Rwanda
- Products: Loans, checking accounts, savings, investments, debit cards
- Total assets: US$14 million (2014)
- Number of employees: 100+ (2014)
- Parent: Bank of Africa Group (90%)
- Website: www.boarwanda.com

Bank of Africa Rwanda Limited, also BOA Rwanda, formerly known as Agaseke Bank, is a commercial bank in Rwanda. It is one of the licensed banks in the Republic of Rwanda. The bank is a growing financial services provider in Rwanda. As of December 2012, its total assets were valued at approximately US$14.6 million (RWF:9.2 billion).

== History ==
BOA Rwanda was formed in November 2003 as Centre Financier aux Entrepreneurs Agaseke (CFE SA Agaseke), with the aim of providing financial services to small and medium-sized businesses. On 14 December 2010, the shareholders adopted a resolution to convert CFE SA Agaseke to a microfinance bank, and adopted the name Agaseke Bank. It was granted a banking license by the National Bank of Rwanda, the national banking regulator, in 2011, and commenced commercial banking services in the same year.

On October 15, 2015, the Bank of Africa Group announced its acquisition of a 90% stake in Agaseke Bank. This led to Agaske Bank changing its name to Bank of Africa Rwanda Limited and converting to a commercial bank.

== Ownership ==
The stock of the bank is privately owned by institutional and individual investors. As of December 2015, the shareholding in the bank was as depicted in the table below:

Bank of Africa Rwanda stock ownership
Rank	Name of owner	Percentage ownership
1	Bank of Africa Group	90.00
2	Other retail investors	10.00
	Total	100.00

== Branches ==
As of August 2017, the bank maintained the following interlinked branches.

- Main branch, ground floor, Chic Complex, Nyarugege, Kigali
- Kayonza branch
- Gizozi branch, Umukindo House, Kigali
- Muhanga branch
- Rusizi branch
- Rubavu branch
- Musanze branch
- Huye branch
- Nyabugogo branch
- Remera branch
- Gikondo branch
- Kamironko branch
- Nyarugege branch, KIC House, Kigali
- Soras Outlet, Kakuyu Street, Kigali
- Kabuga branch

== See also ==
- List of banks in Rwanda
- Economy of Rwanda
- Bank of Africa Group
- Bank of Africa Kenya Limited
- Bank of Africa Uganda Limited
- Bank of Africa Ghana Limited
