= Aïssa =

Moulay Aïssa ben Idriss II (Aïssa ben idrīs ben idrīs ben `abd allah ben al-ḥasan) was born in Fez, Morocco in the 9th century. He was the son of Idriss II and the descendant of both Idriss I and his brother Suleyman the sultan of Tlemcen. He was the governor of the region of Salé.
