= MASI index =

Moroccan stock index

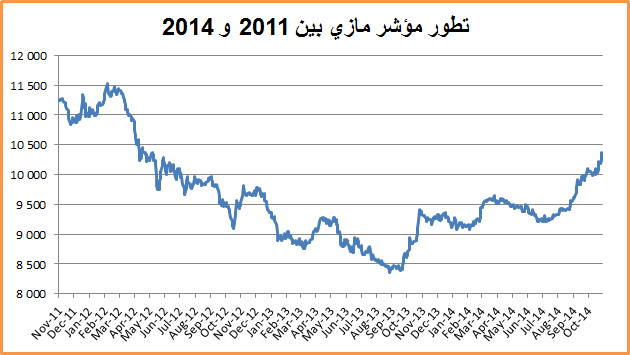
MASI index 2011-2014

The MASI (Moroccan all shares index) is a stock index that tracks the performance of all companies listed in the Casablanca Stock Exchange located at Casablanca, Morocco. It is one of the two main indexes at the stock exchange, the other being the MADEX (Moroccan most active shares index).

== See also ==
- MADEX index
