= Casablanca Stock Exchange =

Stock exchange in Casablanca, Morocco

- بورصة الدار البيضاء; Bourse de Casablanca

- Type: Stock Exchange
- Location: Casablanca, Morocco
- Founded: November 7, 1929; 97 years ago
- Key people: Brahim Benjelloun Touimi (chairman of the board of directors); Tarik Senhaji (managing director)
- Currency: MAD
- Market cap: 1.043 trillion MAD (13 August 2025) ($116 billion USD)
- Indices: MASI; MASI 20; MASI ESG; MASI Mid and Small Cap
- Website: casablanca-bourse.com

The Casablanca Stock Exchange (CSE; Arabic: بورصة الدار البيضاء; French: Bourse de Casablanca) is a stock exchange based in Casablanca, Morocco. It is the second-largest stock exchange in Africa, after the Johannesburg Stock Exchange.

Established in 1929, the Casablanca Stock Exchange plays a central role in the Moroccan financial system. As of August 2025, it comprised 17 brokerage firms and 78 listed companies, with a total market capitalisation of approximately 1.043 trillion dirhams (about US$116 billion).

The exchange underwent major reforms in 1993, leading to the modernization of its regulatory framework and trading infrastructure. An electronic trading system was introduced, and the market was reorganized into two segments: the Central Market and the Block Trade Market, the latter dedicated to block trades.

In 1997, the Casablanca Stock Exchange established the central securities depository Maroclear, responsible for the clearing and settlement of securities transactions.

== History ==
Since its establishment in 1929, the Casablanca Stock Exchange has undergone several legal, institutional and technical reforms aimed at adapting its operations to developments in domestic and international financial markets.

In early 2008, the exchange adopted the NSC V900 trading system, also used by Euronext, further improving the automation and transparency of transactions. By mid-2008, market capitalisation had exceeded €67 billion, while average daily trading volume was above €100 million.

During the 2010s, the Casablanca Stock Exchange continued to adapt its institutional framework and infrastructure, notably through changes to its legal status and the strengthening of its role in financing the Moroccan economy. In 2014, average daily trading volume was estimated at €10 million.

In the 2020s, the exchange consolidated its position among Africa's leading stock markets, with market capitalisation exceeding 1,000 billion dirhams, reflecting both market expansion and changes in the valuation of listed companies.

== Indices ==
Originally, the Casablanca Stock Exchange used the Index de la Bourse des Valeurs de Casablanca (IGB) as its main index. In January 2002, the IGB was replaced by two indices: MASI and MADEX.

=== MASI ===
The MASI (Moroccan All Shares Index) includes all listed shares. It allows investors to follow the overall performance of listed securities and provides a broad view of long-term market trends.

=== MADEX ===
The MADEX (Moroccan Most Active Shares Index) comprised the most actively traded shares listed continuously on the exchange. Its variations were closely linked to the overall market, and it served as a reference index for funds invested in equities.

The MADEX was replaced by the MSI20 from the beginning of 2022.

=== CFG 25 ===
The CFG 25 consists of 25 stocks listed on the Casablanca Stock Exchange and represents around 80% of the total market capitalization of all listed companies.

== Related organizations ==
- Bank Al-Maghrib (BAM)
- Moroccan Capital Market Authority (AMMC)
- Ministry of Economy and Finance
- General Confederation of Moroccan Enterprises (CGEM)
- Brokerage Firms Association (APSB)
- Moroccan Trust Companies and Investment Funds Association (ASFIM)
- Moroccan Banks Professional Grouping (GPBM)

== See also ==
- Economy of Morocco
- List of African stock exchanges
- List of Mideast stock exchanges
- List of stock exchanges
