= List of banks in Ivory Coast =

This is a list of commercial banks in Ivory Coast, as updated in September 2024 by the Banking Commission of the West African Monetary Union.

== List of commercial banks ==
- AFG Bank
- Afriland First Bank Côte d'Ivoire, part of Afriland First Bank Group
- Bank of Africa - Côte d'Ivoire (BOA-CI), part of Bank of Africa Group
- Banque Atlantique Côte d'Ivoire (BACI), part of BCP Group
- Banque d'Abidjan
- Banque de l'Habitat de Côte d'Ivoire (BHCI)
- Banque De l'Union - Côte d'Ivoire (BDU-CI)
- Banque Internationale pour le Commerce et l'Industrie de la Côte d'Ivoire (BICICI), state-owned
- Banque Nationale d'Investissement
- Banque Populaire de Côte d'Ivoire
- Banque Sahélo-Saharienne pour l'Investissement et le Commerce - Côte d'Ivoire, part of BSIC Group
- BGFIBank Côte d'Ivoire, part of BGFIBank Group
- Bridge Bank Group Côte d'Ivoire (BBG-CI), part of the Teyliom Group
- Citibank Côte d'Ivoire, part of Citigroup
- Coris Bank International Côte d'Ivoire, part of Coris Bank Group
- Ecobank Côte d'Ivoire, part of Ecobank Group
- Guaranty Trust Bank Côte d'Ivoire (GTBank-CI), part of GTCO Group
- Mansa Bank
- NSIA Banque Côte d'Ivoire (formerly BIAO), part of the Ivorian NSIA Group (French: Nouvelle société interafricaine d'assurance)
- Orabank Côte d'Ivoire, part of Orabank Group
- Orange Bank Côte d'Ivoire, part of Orange Group
- Société Générale Côte d'Ivoire (SGCI), part of Société Générale Group
- Société Ivoirienne de Banque (SIB), part of Attijariwafa Bank Group
- Stanbic Bank, part of Standard Bank Group
- Standard Chartered Bank Côte d'Ivoire, part of Standard Chartered Group
- United Bank for Africa (UBA), part of UBA Group
- Versus Bank
- Branch of Banque Malienne de Solidarité (BMS)
- Branch of Banque Régionale de Marchés (BRM)

The four largest banks are BICICI, NSIA, SGCI and SIB.

== See also ==
- Economy of Ivory Coast
- List of banks in Africa
