= List of banks in Senegal =

This is a list of commercial banks in Senegal, as updated in September 2024 by the Banking Commission of the West African Monetary Union.

== List of commercial banks ==
- Algerian Bank of Senegal (ABS)
- Bank of Africa - Senegal (BOA-Senegal), part of Bank of Africa Group
- Banque Atlantique Senegal, part of BCP Group
- Banque de Dakar (BDK)
- Banque de l'Habitat du Sénégal (BHS)
- Banque des Institutions Mutualistes d'Afrique de l'Ouest (BIMAO)
- Banque Islamique du Sénégal (BIS)
- Banque Nationale pour le Développement Économique (BNDE)
- Banque Régionale de Marchés (BRM)
- Banque Sahélo-Saharienne pour l'Investissement et le Commerce - Senegal, part of BSIC Group
- BGFIBank Senegal, part of BGFIBank Group
- CBAO Groupe Attijariwafa Bank, part of Attijariwafa Bank Group
- Citibank Senegal, part of Citigroup
- Coris Bank International - Senegal (CBI-Senegal), part of Coris Bank Group
- Crédit du Sénégal (CDS), part of Attijarawafa Bank Group
- Credit International (CI)
- Ecobank Senegal, part of Ecobank Group
- FBNBank Senegal, part of First Bank of Nigeria Group
- La Banque Agricole (LBA)
- La Banque Outarde (LBO)
- Société Générale de Banques au Sénégal, part of Société Générale Group
- SUNU Bank Senegal (former BICIS), part of SUNU Group
- United Bank for Africa Senegal (UBA-Senegal), part of UBA Group
- Branch of Banque de Développement du Mali
- Branch of BCI-Mali, part of BCI Group
- Branch of Bridge Bank Group Côte d'Ivoire (BBG-CI)
- Branch of NSIA Banque Benin, part of NSIA Group
- Branch of Orabank Côte d'Ivoire, part of Orabank Group
- Branch of Orange Branch Africa, part of Orange Group

== See also ==
- Central Bank of West African States
- Economy of Senegal
- List of banks in Africa
