= List of banks in Mali =

This is a list of commercial banks in Mali, as updated in September 2024 by the Banking Commission of the West African Monetary Union.

== List of commercial banks ==
- AFG Bank (formerly BICIM)
- Bank of Africa - Mali (BOA-Mali), part of Bank of Africa Group
- Banque Atlantique Mali, part of BCP Group
- Banque Commerciale du Sahel (BCS)
- Banque du Développement du Mali (BDM), minority-owned by Bank of Africa Group
- Banque Internationale pour le Mali (BIM), part of Attijariwafa Bank Group
- Banque Malienne de Solidarité (BMS)
- Banque Nationale de Développement Agricole (BNDA)
- Banque pour le Commerce et l'Industrie du Mali (BCI-Mali), part of BCI Group
- Banque Sahélo-Saharienne pour l'Investissement et le Commerce - Mali, part of BSIC Group
- Coris Bank International Mali, part of Coris Bank Group
- Ecobank - Mali, part of Ecobank Group
- United Bank for Africa - Mali (UBA-Mali), part of UBA Group
- Branch of Orabank

== See also ==
- Economy of Mali
- List of banks in Africa
