= Al-Kattani =

al-Kattānī (Note: Also Romanized as Kettani, El Kettani, Kattani, etc.) (Arabic: الكتاني) is a sharifi family name.

al-Kattani could refer to:

- Muḥammad Bin ʿAbd al-Kabīr Al-Kattani
- Muhammad ibn Ja'far al-Kattani
- Abdelhay al-Kattani
- Mohamed El Kettani
- Hassan Kettani
- Ibn al-Kattani
