= CBAO =

CBAO may refer to:

- CBD-FM, a Canadian radio channel
- CBAO Groupe Attijariwafa Bank (formerly the Compagnie Bancaire de l'Afrique Occidentale), a bank in Senegal
