= Banque de l'Afrique occidentale =

French colonial bank

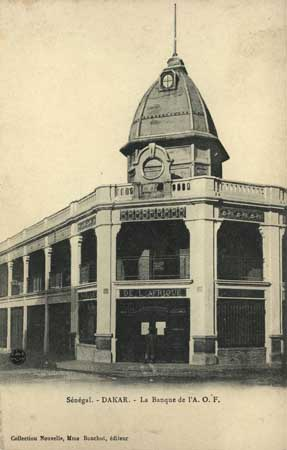
New main office of the BAO in Dakar, ca. 1904

The Banque de l'Afrique occidentale (BAO, lit. 'Bank of Western Africa'), known from 1853 to 1901 as Banque du Sénégal and from 1965 to 1990 as the Banque internationale pour l'Afrique occidentale (BIAO), was a bank headquartered in Dakar. During most of its history it was the main or only commercial bank and bank of issue in French Senegal and French West Africa.

Following the independence of most of France’s sub-Saharan African colonies in 1960, the bank remained a major financial institution and was present in 17 African countries by the late 1980s, when it experienced financial turmoil and was eventually dismantled in a restructuring led by the Banque Nationale de Paris.

== Banque du Sénégal ==
The Banque du Sénégal was founded by decree of Napoleon III of 21 December 1853, which established it as a discount and credit bank. It started operations in 1855 in Saint-Louis, by then the capital of French Senegal, under the rule of governor Louis Faidherbe. In 1867 the bank opened an agency in Gorée, the region's other trading center under French rule. In 1884, Dakar had become increasingly important and the bank transferred its head office there from Saint-Louis. In 1899 it opened a branch in Rufisque, the last of the colony's so-called Four Communes.

The bank's ownership structure was based on the number of slaves owned or sold at the time of the legislation of 30 April 1849 which settled compensation following the abolition of slavery. The Bordeaux trading house Maurel bought shares from others, and ended up holding 73 percent of the bank's capital, the other shareholders being five houses including Teisseire and Beynis, the Marseille house Charles Bohn, and five mulattoes.

The bank was granted the privilege to issue bearer banknotes for 20 years, renewed in 1874. However, at the beginning, commercial exchanges continued to be settled with convenience currencies or traditional means of exchange: gold powder, cowrie shells, iron bars, Maria Theresa thalers or silver piastres of the same weight, cotton loincloths, blocks of compressed rock salt, among others.

After 1894, the issuance privilege was only renewed from year to year. The bank had opted not to expand its activity beyond French Senegal, while the French Government wanted a bank capable of issuing money for all its sub-Saharan African colonies.

== Banque de l'Afrique Occidentale ==
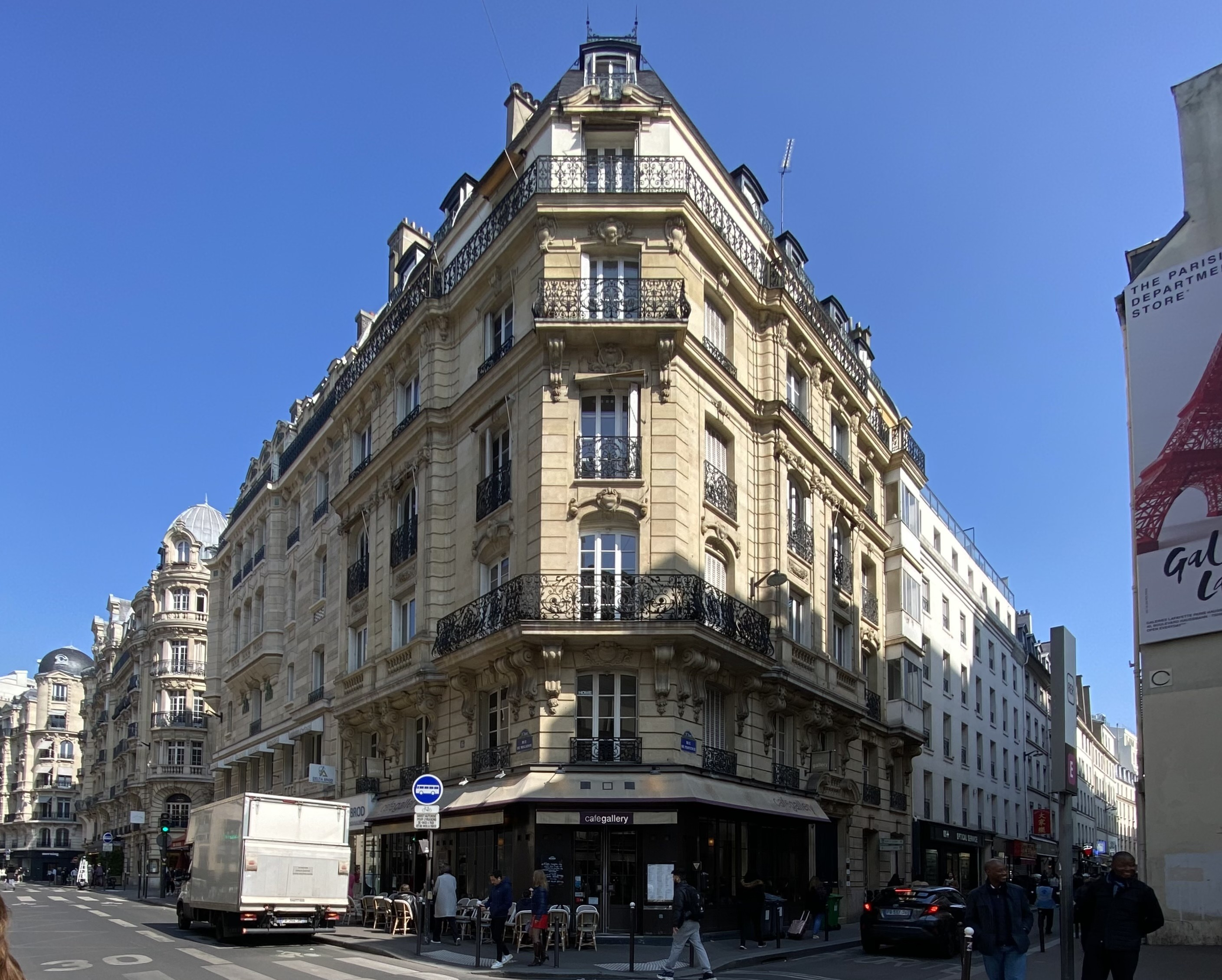
Building at 78, rue de Provence in Paris, BAO head office from 1901 to 1911

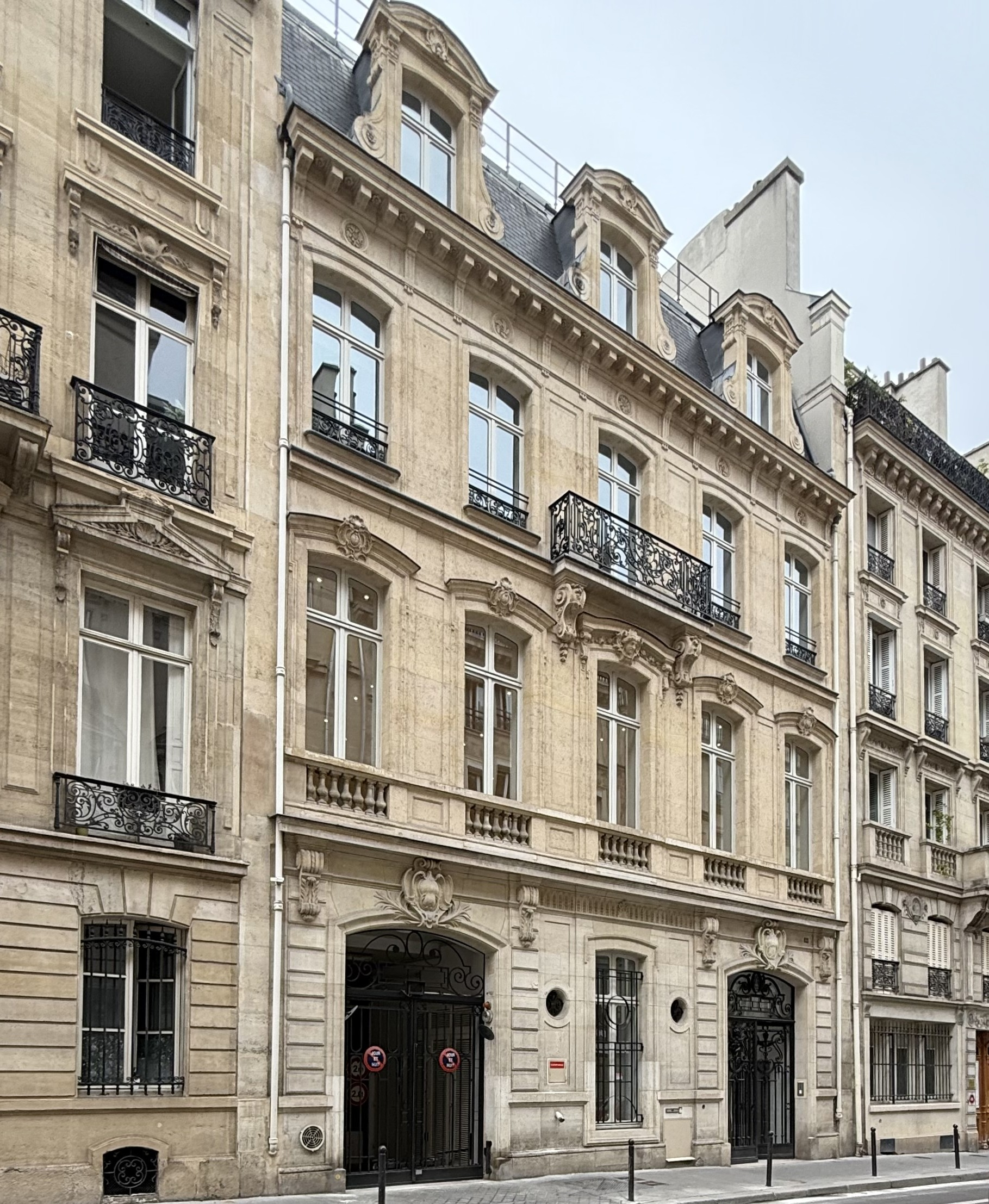
Building at 38, rue La Bruyère in Paris, BAO head office from 1911 to the early 1940s

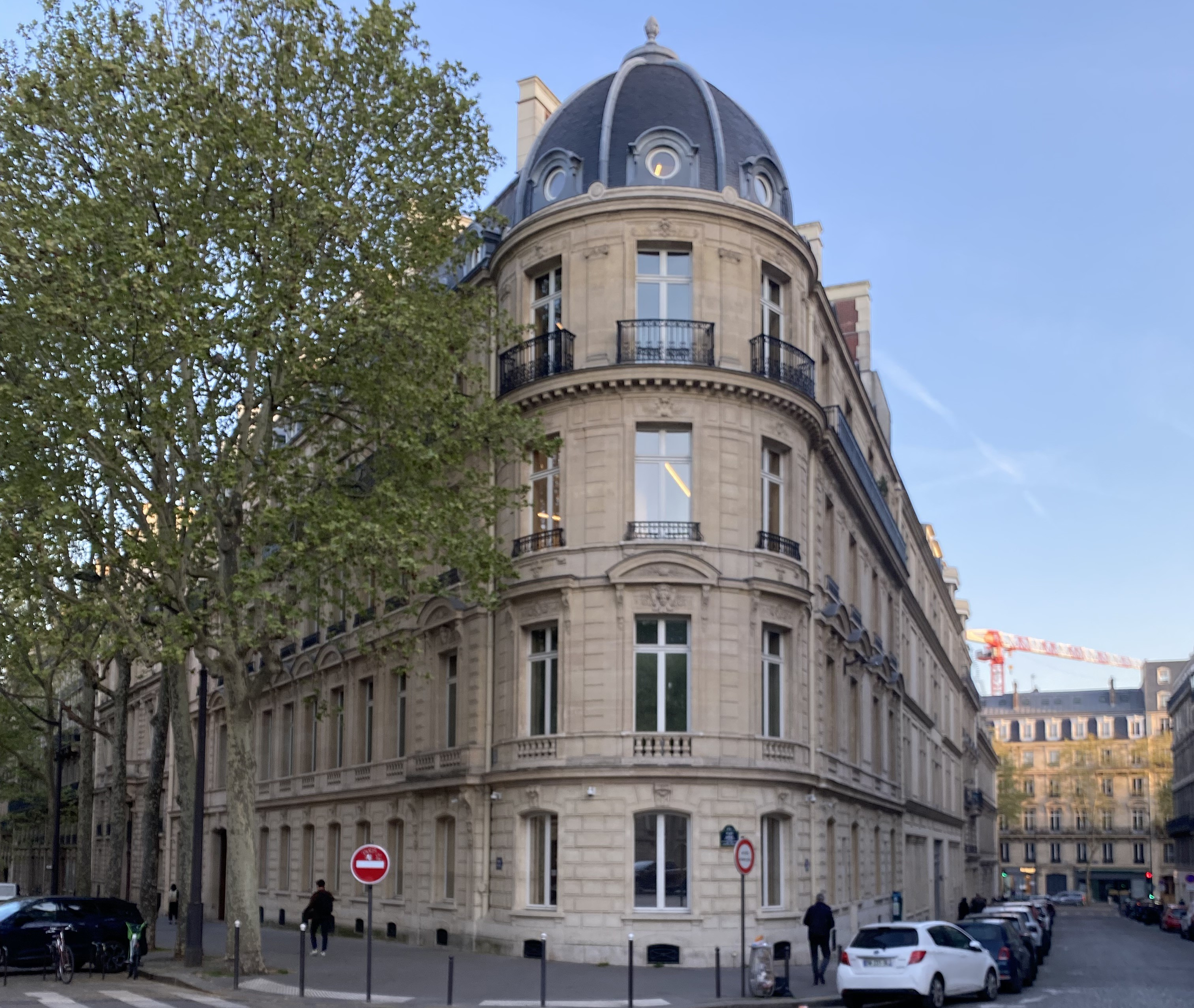
Building at 9, avenue de Messine in Paris, postwar head office of the BAO then the BIAO until the latter's liquidation

In 1901, the Banque du Sénégal was reorganized and its incorporation formally relocated from Dakar to Paris, initially at 78 rue de Provence, following the previous year's similar relocation of the Banque de l'Algérie. It was granted a role of bank of issue with a geographical scope widened to all French West Africa. From 1901 to 1919 it was the only bank active in French West Africa, whereas in French Equatorial Africa there was barely any banking activity at all.

Its network continued to expand, to Conakry in 1902, Porto-Novo in 1903, and Grand-Bassam in 1906. In 1903, a new building was erected on the Kermel square in Dakar. A branch was also opened in Monrovia in 1904, but it was unprofitable and the BOA had closed it by 1907. In 1910, aiming at a role of bank of issue in Madagascar, it renamed itself the Banque de l'Afrique Occidentale et Orientale, but abandoned the new name as the project never came to fruition. At the same time, it established a representative office in Libreville, a cautious first step into French Equatorial Africa. In 1911, it purchased a building at 38, rue La Bruyère in Paris and relocated its head office there. During World War I, it relocated its head office to Bordeaux from September 1914 to January 1915, then moved back to Paris.

In the course of World War I, French troops occupied Cameroon, and in 1917 the BAO requested ministerial authorization to open a branch in Douala, which eventually opened in May 1921. In 1918, the BAO's issuance privilege was extended to French Equatorial Africa as well as Cameroon and Togo, both under French mandate, and a branch was also opened in Lomé in October 1922. In mid-1920, the bank's issuance privilege expired after twenty years; in subsequent years it was renewed only on an annual basis, and from 1925 on a half-yearly basis. Eventually a new agreement was signed in 1927, ratified by the French Parliament in 1928-1929 and entered into force on 1 July 1929, extending the issuance privilege by 20 years (until 1949). By then the French government had become a significant minority shareholder but stopped short of appointing the bank's leadership.

By the 1920s, business in the AOF was dominated by just three private joint stock companies: the Compagnie Française de l'Afrique Occidentale, the Nouvelle Société Commerciale africaine, and the Société Commerciale de l'Ouest Africain (lagging slightly were the growing plantation and mining interests of the Unilever company). The BAO's board largely overlapped with the boards of these trading companies. Banking institutions, public and private, enabled colonial businesses to pull more of the West African economy into a moneyed economy and expand the replacement of traditional agriculture with large scale cash crops for export. This was most evident in the tremendous growth of groundnut plantations. The strategy of using BAO to foster inward investment was something of a failure though. Capital extraction, not capital investment was the source of French wealth in West Africa. Taxes and import/export duties coming from the African colonies to the Metropole accounted for most of the capital movement in the AOF. Major legal concessions were made to the BOA, and while it dominated the banking sector, its capital remained minuscule in comparison to companies engaged in capital extraction from the AOF. The BOA held capital of 6 million francs before 1914, and that rose to 50 million in 1931, but declined thereafter. In 1940 all banks in the AOF had a total investment of just over 1.5 million francs. But forestry alone had an inward investment of almost 3.4 million francs that year.

In the 1920s two newly created competitors, the Banque Française de l'Afrique (BFA, est. 1904) and the Banque Comerciale Africaine (BCA, est. 1924), partly eroded the BOA's monopoly over commercial banking in the region. The sharp deterioration of economic conditions from late 1930, however, led to the failure of the BFA in late July 1930 and its liquidation in 1931, which in turn put the BOA under financial stress. In the ensuing period, the BOA became more aligned with the government and started acting more like a central bank, playing a key role in restructuring the failing BCA in late 1931. The economic conditions started to recover in the mid-1930s.

Meanwhile, the BAO's branch network kept expanding to Bamako in 1925, Brazzaville in July 1926, Kaolack and Port Gentil in 1928, Cotonou and Libreville in 1929-1930, and Pointe-Noire in 1937. In 1935, the BAO's main office in Côte d'Ivoire was relocated from Grand-Bassam to Abidjan. The longstanding BAO agency in Rufisque was closed in 1933, and that in Saint-Louis, where it had started activity in the 1850s, in 1936. In 1937, for the first time, a former civil servant, Georges Keller, became the BOA's chairman. By then, the French government held 32 percent of the bank's capital.

In 1940, the BAO remained under the control of Vichy France but lost access to its operations in French Equatorial Africa and Cameroon, where its privilege of money issuance was withdrawn by the Vichy government, then granted by Charles de Gaulle on 24 July 1942 to the recently created Caisse Centrale de la France Libre (CCFL). In the early 1940s, its Paris head office relocated to 9, rue de Messine. Meanwhile, new competition appeared on the BAO's turf, with large French banks starting to create African branch networks of their own. The Banque Nationale pour le Commerce et l'Industrie (BNCI) opened in Dakar in late 1939, Saint-Louis and Abidjan in 1940, Conakry and Bamako in 1941, Cotonou in 1942, Porto-Novo in 1944, and Lomé in 1946. Similarly, Société Générale opened in Dakar and Abidjan in 1941, and Crédit Lyonnais opened in Dakar in 1941, Abidjan in 1942, and Conakry in 1949. The BOA also expanded its network, in Magaria in 1943 and in Zinder in 1944, both near the southern border of Niger, then in Bobo-Dioulasso in May 1945, Bangui in 1946, and Fort Lamy (later N'Djamena) in 1950.

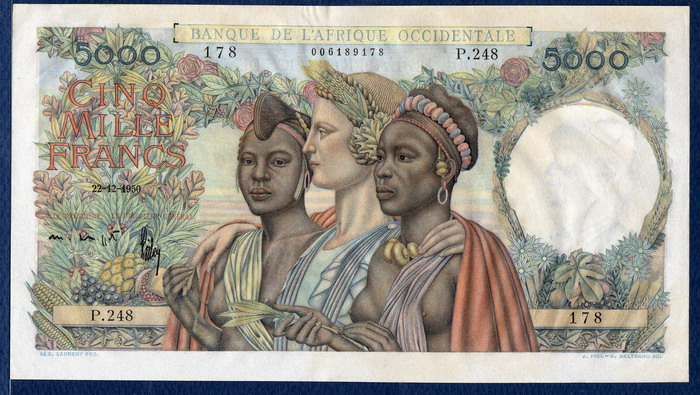
Banknote of the BAO, 1950

The BAO's new building in Dakar in 1961

The BAO's twenty-year issuance privilege of 1929 expired in 1949, triggering a new period of short-term extensions and debates about the future monetary order in the region. In 1955, the CCFL's successor entity, the Caisse Centrale de la France d'Outre-Mer (CCFOM), had its issuance privilege in French Equatorial Africa and Cameroon transferred to a new affiliate, the Institut d'Émission de l'Afrique Équatoriale Française et du Cameroun. The CCFOM's head, André Postel-Vinay, convinced the government of Pierre Mendès France to simultaneously terminate the monetary role of the BAO in French West Africa and Togo and to grant it instead to another new institution, the Institut d'Émission de l'Afrique Occidentale Française et du Togo. Later in 1955, the French government divested its shares in the BAO's capital. From then on, the BAO continued its activity as a commercial bank with no public-interest role. In the early 1960s, as many African countries gained independence, it had 38 offices in Africa and contributed significantly to the financing of many infrastructures in the new countries, such as Côte d'Ivoire or Senegal.

== Banque Internationale pour l'Afrique Occidentale ==
In 1965, the BAO concluded negotiations with the First National City Bank of New York (FNCBNY, later Citibank) to inject fresh capital into its operations. As the FNCBNY was uninterested in the BAO's property assets, the BAO retained these and renamed itself the Compagnie Financière France-Afrique (Cofifa), while transferring all its African banking operations to a newly created French entity in which FNCBNY was willing to invest, the Banque internationale pour l'Afrique occidentale (BIAO). Cofifa owned 51 percent of BIAO's equity capital, while FNCBNY owned 49 percent. Some sections in Central Africa became the Banque internationale pour la Centrafrique (BICA), while the BIAO also owned minority stakes in the Banque Internationale pour l'Afrique au Togo (30 percent) and Banque Internationale du Burkina (25 percent), the latter originally known as the Banque Internationale des Voltas.

The BIAO's operations were subject to the often turbulent politics of the respective newly independent countries. For example, by the mid-1970s the BIAO was the only private-sector financial institution left in Niger. In June 1975, the government of Benin nationalized the BIAO there and merged it together with all other commercial banks in the country into the state-owned Banque Commerciale du Bénin. In other countries, the government merely imposed the creation of a separately capitalized subsidiary in which itself and/or other stakeholders became shareholders.

By 1976, Banque Nationale de Paris (BNP) owned 37.7 percent of the capital of Cofifa, ahead of Crédit Commercial de France (10 percent) and Banque de Madagascar et des Comores (4.2 percent), which gave BNP effective control over BIAO. In 1977, Citibank exited the BIAO following a deterioration of its relationship with its French partners, and sold its shares to UBS (20 percent), Banco do Brasil (20 percent), and Compagnie Inter-Africaine de Banque (CIAB), a Luxembourg holding company owned by African interests (9 percent). In 1980, the BIAO established a separate subsidiary for its operations in Niger, headquartered in Niamey with offices in Zinder, Maradi, Arlit, and Tahoua. That same year, the Ivorian government took a 30 percent stake in BIAO-Côte d'Ivoire.

== Liquidation and aftermath ==
Partly as a consequence of the 1980s oil glut and of political turmoil, the BIAO entered severe financial distress at the end of the decade. In 1988, the French government directed the then state-owned BNP to lead a restructuring. During 1989, BNP increased its share of Cofifa's equity from 40.5 to 58 percent. In April 1990, BNP initiated a drastic restructuring by indicating that it would exit most or all of the BIAO's operations in Africa.

On 1 June 1990, BNP exited the BIAO's operations in Côte d'Ivoire and Senegal which were taken over in respective rescue operations led by the Central Bank of West African States. On 14 June 1990, the BIAO initiated a process of orderly liquidation, which was entrusted to administrator Jacques Piot. BIAO Cameroon was separately liquidated later in 1990.

In March 1991, BNP sold the rest of the BIAO's African network to Meridien international Bank limited (MIBL), a holding controlled by financier Andrew Sardanis and incorporated in the Bahamas. By then, BIAO no longer had any assets left in Africa, whereas BNP had successfully sold its head office building at 9, avenue de Messine in Paris. BNP was accused of jeopardizing the BIAO to the benefit of the competing network it owned at the time in Africa under the brand Banque Internationale pour le Commerce et l'Industrie (BICI), especially after MIBL was itself liquidated in a context of fraud allegations in 1995.

In Burkina Faso, the BIAO was renamed Banque Internationale du Burkina (BIB). By end-1996 its capital was owned by private African-owned holding COFIPA (30 percent), Brussels-based Banque Belgolaise (25 percent), the Burkinese government (23 percent), and other domestic private shareholders including the bank's staff (22 percent). It was eventually taken over by United Bank for Africa (UBA) in November 2008. It was renamed UBA Burkina in 2012, and subsequently held by UBA (63.7 percent), the government (10.2 percent), and private shareholders including COFIPA (16.8 percent).

In Côte d'Ivoire, BIAO-CI was still fully owned by the government by the late 1990s. An 80 percent stake was acquired on 25 January 2000 by Banque Belgolaise, while the government retained the other 20 percent. In 2006, Belgolaise in turn sold its stake to a consortium led by insurer Nouvelle Société Interafricaine d'Assurance (NSIA) with the Institution de Prévoyance Sociale, an Ivorian public fund, as a minority participant. The bank was renamed NSIA Banque in 2014, and went public in 2017.

In Gabon, the BIAO was liquidated, as it had been earlier on in Cameroon.

In Niger, BIAO-Niger absorbed the local subsidiary of Banque Nationale de Paris, the Banque International pour le Commerce et l’industrie du Niger (BICIN), on 1 April 1989. In 1991, MIBL acquired 83.6 percent of BIAO-Niger. BIAO-Niger was then acquired by Banque Belgolaise in 1995 during the liquidation of MIBL. The bank was then successively taken over by Coris Bank in 2011, by the Nigerien government in 2012, and eventually in 2015 by the Morocco-based BCP Group.

In Senegal, the former operations of the BIAO were renamed the Compagnie Bancaire de l'Afrique Occidentale (CBAO) in 1993, by then owned by Dakar-based Mimran Group 75 percent), other local private shareholders (16 percent), and the Senegalese government (9 percent). CBAO was acquired in November 2007 by Attijariwafa Bank and renamed CBAO Groupe Attijariwafa Bank.

== Leadership ==
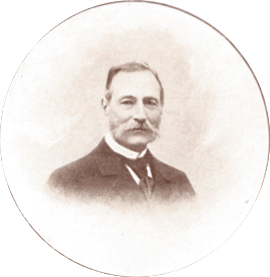
Émile Maurel (1833-1920) was the first chairman of the BAO

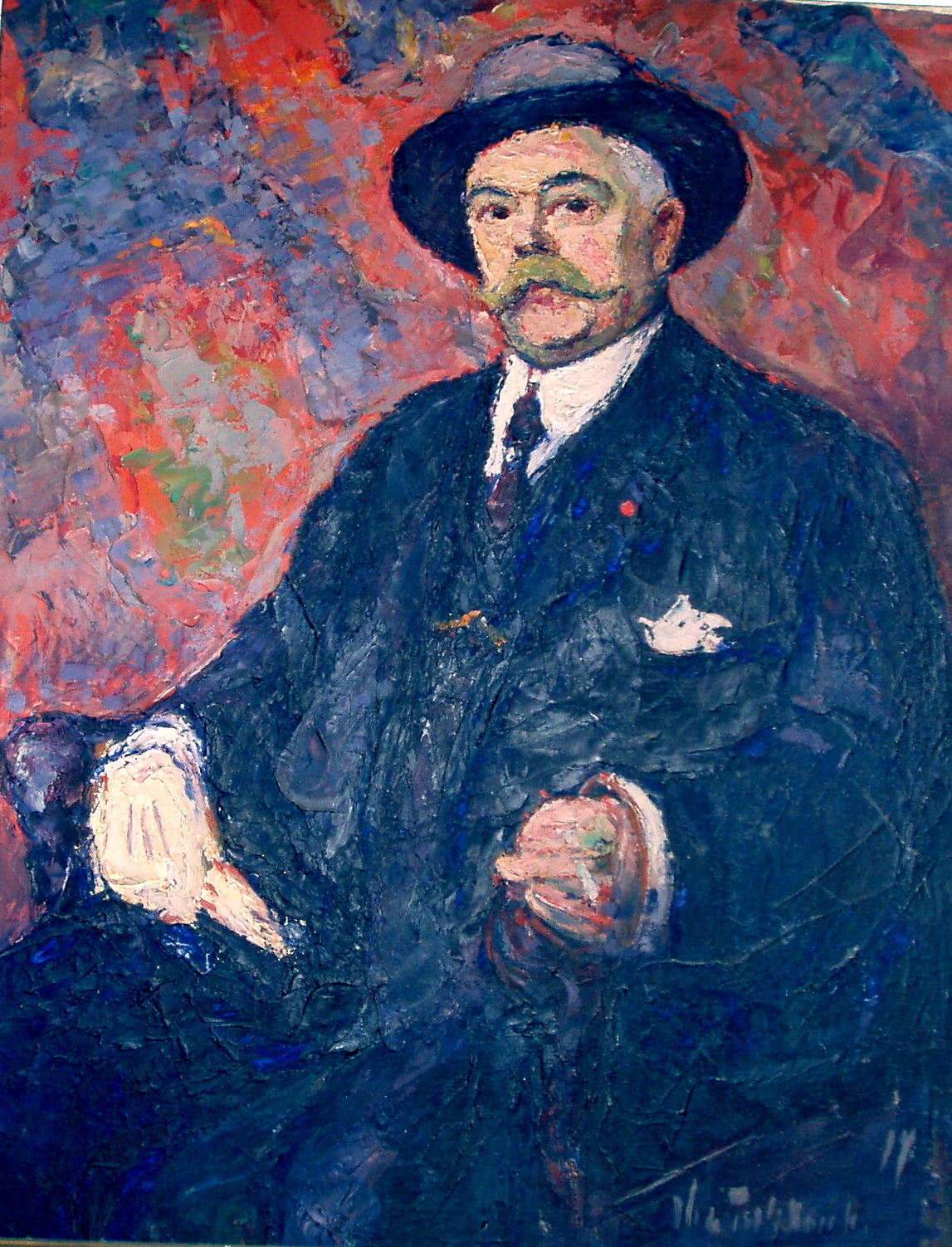
Henri Nouvion (1862-1945) led the BAO during its first three decades

- Pierre Rey, chief executive (French: directeur) of the Banque du Sénégal (BdS) 1853-1858
- Achille Delassault, BdS chief executive 1858-1867
- Jean-Sébastien Haurigot, BdS chief executive 1867-1872
- Michel André, BdS chief executive 1872-1885
- Charles Molinet, BdS chief executive 1885-1896
- Henri Nouvion, chief executive of the Banque du Sénégal 1898-1901 then of the BAO 1901-1931, also member of the Board of Directors from 1915.
- Émile Maurel, BAO chairman (French: président) 1901-1908
- Alexis Rostand, BAO chairman 1908-1919
- Paul Boyer, BAO chairman 1919-1929
- Albert Duchêne, BAO chairman 1929-1936
- Edwin Poilay, BAO chief executive 1931-1955 and chairman 1955-1965?
- Georges Keller, BAO chairman 1936-1948
- Marcel de Coppet, BAO chairman 1948-1952
- André Luquet, BAO chairman 1953-1955
- Georges-Pierre Achard, BAO chief executive 1955-1958
- Pierre Roques, BIAO chairman 1965-1975
- Marc-Antoine Dumas de Chabaud-Latour, BIAO chief executive 1965-1971?
- Jehan Duhamel, BIAO chief executive 1971-1975
- Jean Dromer, BIAO chairman 1975-1986

== See also ==
- Maurel & Prom
- Banque de l'Algérie
- State Bank of Morocco
- Banque de Madagascar
- West African Economic and Monetary Union (French: Union économique et monétaire ouest-africaine)
- Central Bank of West African States (French: Banque Centrale des États de l'Afrique de l'Ouest)
- List of banks in France
