= YouScribe =

French digital library and streaming service

- Company type: Streaming digital library
- Industry: Digital library
- Founded: 2010 in Paris, France
- Founder: Juan Pirlot de Corbion
- Headquarters: Paris, France
- Products: Books, audiobooks, podcasts, educational content, press titles, magazines
- Website: www.youscribe.com

YouScribe is a French digital library and streaming service established in 2010 by Juan Pirlot de Corbion, previously the founder of the online bookstore Chapitre.com. The platform is headquartered in Paris, France, and offers access to a variety of digital reading materials including books, audiobooks, podcasts, educational content, and magazines in French, English, and Arabic.

== History ==
YouScribe was launched in 2011 as an open library solution for document sharing. By 2015, the company had adopted a subscription model, in partnership with publishers, providing unlimited access to its digital library for a monthly payment. This model includes a wide array of content types such as books, audiobooks, podcasts, educational content, press titles, and magazines.

In 2017, YouScribe expanded its services to the African continent. The following year, in March 2018, the platform joined forces with the Organisation Internationale de la Francophonie to provide French-speaking educational resources for integration into its programs. In October 2018, YouScribe formed a partnership with Orange Group and Digital Virgo, enabling all of Orange's African subsidiaries to integrate the YouScribe service into their offerings, with subscriptions available on a daily, weekly, or monthly basis, paid through the user's mobile plan.

The service was deployed in Senegal and Cameroon in April 2019, and a month later in Ivory Coast, before further expanding to Mali, the DRC, and Guinea. In 2020, YouScribe established an organization based in Africa to facilitate access to its streaming library for schools, universities, and businesses. The same year, the company unveiled a digital library project for youth called Maktabati, in collaboration with Maroc Telecom.

In 2021, YouScribe signed a partnership agreement with the Moroccan telephone operator Inwi to launch a reading offer in Morocco. March 2022 saw a partnership with Canal+ Group to offer subscribers in Africa access to the library with their subscription. In February 2022, YouScribe raised 5 million euros from the Banque des Territoires. This funding was part of the France 2030 investment plan. By September 2022, YouScribe had reached 1 million subscribers across 11 African countries. In June 2023, the company signed a further partnership agreement with the Ministry of Culture and Communication of Morocco, providing 10,000 accesses to its content to equip 50 media libraries across the country.

In October 2023, at the Algiers International Book Fair, YouScribe announced the introduction of its services in Algeria. This expansion was facilitated through a partnership with Djezzy and Qanawat.

In March 2024, YouScribe collaborated with Digital Virgo and MTN to launch its services in Ghana. This marked the company's second expansion into an English-speaking African country, following its earlier launch in South Africa.

== Partnerships and sponsorship ==
YouScribe has established several partnerships with book and reading fairs, notably:

- 72 heures du livre of Conakry
- African Book Fair of Paris
- Rabat International Book Fair
- International Book Fair of Algiers
- Abidjan International Book Fair

== Events ==
- Trophée des Plumes: In partnership with Orange Money Europe, YouScribe organized the Trophée des Plumes, a writing competition rewarding new talents from across the globe. The first edition took place in 2021.
- Rentrée Littéraire Africaine: In 2022, YouScribe organized the first edition of the Rentrée Littéraire Africaine, an event aimed at promoting the latest African literary publications.
- Guinean Book Prize: In May 2022, YouScribe partnered with the Orange Guinea Foundation to launch the first edition of the Guinean Book Prize.

== Awards and recognition ==
- 2013: Entrepreneur d'Ernst & Young Prize
- 2017: Digital Africa Prize
- 2020: Publishing Trophies - Digital Innovation
- 2022: Special mention for the international company achieving the best growth in Africa - Africa Investment Forum & Awards
