= Malian Solidarity Bank bombing =

2013 bombing

- Part of Mali War
- Location: Malian Solidarity Bank, Kidal, Mali
- Date: December 14, 2013; 6:45 am
- Target: MINUSMA: Senegalese peacekeepers; Malian gendarmeries
- Attack type: Suicide attack
- Weapon: Car bomb
- Deaths: 3 (2 peacekeepers and 1 suicide bomber)
- Injuries: 9
- Perpetrator: Katibat Salahadin

On 14 December 2013, Katibat Salahadin militants launched a suicide car bomb attack on Senegalese peacekeepers and Malian soldiers in front of the Malian Solidarity Bank, located in the city of Kidal. Residents of Kidal stated that the attack was one of the most destructive since the beginning of the Mali War.

== Background ==
Following French intervention in Mali and the creation of MINUSMA in 2013, Malian forces and MINUSMA peacekeepers were under control of the city of Kidal. At the start of the Mali War, the city had been swiftly captured by the National Movement for the Liberation of Azawad (MNLA) and jihadist groups such as Ansar Dine.

== Attack ==
On the night between December 13 and 14, three men were suspected of carrying out reconnaissance activities near the Malian Solidarity Bank in Kidal. The building was then guarded by Senegalese peacekeepers from MINUSMA on the outside, while Malian gendarmeries were posted inside. The next day, around 6:45 am, a VBIED driven by a suicide bomber rammed into the peacekeepers in front of the bank.

The facade of the bank collapsed during the explosion, and other buildings up to several hundred meters away were damaged. All doors and windows within a five hundred meter radius were blown out, and a MINUSMA vehicle was destroyed. Immediately following the attack, French soldiers and other peacekeepers ran to the scene.

== Aftermath ==
MINUSMA stated the attack killed two Senegalese peacekeepers and the suicide bomber. Several Malian soldiers were injured, and seven Senegalese peacekeepers were injured. The attack was claimed the same day by Sultan Ould Bady, head of Katibat Salahadin, one of the four katibas of MOJWA. In a telephone call to AFP, he stated the attack "was a response to the African countries who sent soldiers to support François Hollande's fight in the land of Islam."

On May 11, 2014, Alhousseini Ag Ahayare was arrested in Kidal by the French Army in suspicion of being involved in the Kidal attack. He was the former Islamic commissioner of Ansar Dine, and had recently joined the High Council for the Unity of Azawad.
