= Wafa Assurance =

- Traded as: CSE: WAA
- Industry: Insurance
- Founded: 1972; 54 years ago
- Headquarters: Casablanca, Morocco
- Key people: Boubker Jaï (Chairman and CEO); Badreddine Belghiti (Deputy Managing director)
- Total assets: Market Cap: MAD 17,507 million (2025)
- Parent: Attijariwafa Bank
- Website: wafaassurance.ma

Wafa Assurance is a Moroccan insurance company and a subsidiary of Attijariwafa Bank. Founded in 1972, it is headquartered in Casablanca. The company operates in both life and non-life insurance segments, serving individual and corporate clients. It is part of the Al Mada holding group.

== History ==
The company was founded in 1972, under the name Société Nouvelle d’Assurances (SNA). A few months after its establishment, the company took over the portfolios of the local operations of two insurance companies, Saint Paul Fire and Norwich Union.

In 1989, Société Nouvelle d’Assurances changed its name to Wafa Assurance, reflecting its integration into Wafabank.

In 2003, following the merger between Banque Commerciale du Maroc and the Wafabank, Wafa Assurance became the insurance subsidiary of Attijariwafa bank.

In 2011, Wafa Assurance launched its assistance subsidiary, Wafa IMA Assistance, in partnership with the Inter Mutuelles Assistance.

In May 2023, the board of directors appointed Boubker Jai, former chief executive officer of Attijariwafa Bank, as chief executive officer of Wafa Assurance.

In 2025, Wafa Assurance acquired a 63.4% stake in Delta Insurance, a publicly listed insurance company based in Egypt.

In 2026, Wafa Assurance acquired part of the assets of Allianz Maroc.

== Subsidiaries ==
=== Ivory Coast ===
In February 2016, Wafa Assurance received regulatory approval to operate in Ivory Coast. In November of the same year, the company officially launched two subsidiaries: Wafa Assurance Vie Côte d’Ivoire and Wafa Assurance Côte d’Ivoire.

=== Cameroon ===
On 8 July 2015, Wafa Assurance obtained regulatory approval for its subsidiary Wafa Assurance Vie Cameroun.

=== Senegal ===
Wafa Assurance operates in Senegal through its subsidiaries Wafa Assurance Vie Sénégal and Wafa Assurance Sénégal.

=== Tunisia ===
Wafa Assurance has been present in Tunisia since 2012. It launched a subsidiary under the name Attijari Assurance.

== Key people ==
- Boubker Jaï, chairman of the board and chief executive officer, Member of the Executive Committee
- Badreddine Belghiti, Deputy Managing director
- Yasmine Aboudrar, Administrator - Representative of OGM
- Rachida Benabdellah, Administrator
- Hassan Bertal, Administrator
- Ahmed Ismail Douiri, Administrator
- Gilles Dupin, Administrator
- Mohammed El Kettani, Administrator
- Marie-Laure Mazaud, Administrator
- Magali Noe, Administrator
- Hassan Ouriagli, Administrator
- Aymane Taud, Administrator
- Abdelmjid Tazlaoui, Administrator

== Ownership ==
- OGM (Owned by Attijariwafa Bank) 79.29%
- Others 20.71%
