= Mohamed El Kettani =

Moroccan businessman and CEO

- Born: 1958 (age 66–67); Morocco
- Education: ENSTA Paris
- Occupation(s): Business executive, Banker
- Known for: CEO of Attijariwafa Bank

Mohamed El Kettani is a Moroccan businessman who is the CEO of Attijariwafa Bank. He previously worked at Wafa Assurance, and serves concurrently as a director of the Société Ivoirienne de Banque.

== Education ==
El Kettani earned an engineering diploma from ENSTA Paris.

== Career ==
El Kettani began his career at the Banque Commerciale du Maroc in 1984.

El Kettani is an adviser to King Mohammed VI of Morocco.

== Recognition ==
In April 2015, he became an Officer of the Order of French Legion of Honour On 22 July 2019, El Kettani received the rank of Commander of the National Order of the Ivory Coast.
