= JUMO =

- Company type: Privately held company
- Industry: Financial technology
- Founded: 2015
- Key people: Andrew Watkins-Ball (CEO)
- Number of employees: 250+
- Website: www.jumo.world

JUMO is a mobile financial technology platform for mobile network operators, payments providers and banks. The company facilitates digital financial services such as credit and savings in emerging markets by way of USSD short codes and banking applications.

== History ==
The company was founded in 2015 by CEO Andrew Watkins-Ball and has received undisclosed funding from several digital financial services investors including LeapFrog Investments, Anthemis Group and Vostok Emerging Finance. JUMO started as a mobile financial services startup company for the Ghanaian market. After its proven potential to deliver digital financial services over mobile (primarily feature phones) became apparent, it scaled into a global business serving Africa. Through September 2016, it had delivered more than 10 million loans to customers in 6 countries including Tanzania, Kenya, Zambia, Rwanda and Uganda.

The firm's customers custom built banking technology enables banks, mobile financial platforms and financial services providers to reach are mostly unbanked merchants and individuals in emerging markets through alternative financial ecosystems such as mobile money According to JUMO CEO Andrew Watkins-Ball, "A $20 loan that can be accessed without collateral in the middle of the night in a rural village can mean the difference between getting a sick person to hospital and going without medical care." JUMO works with mobile network operators including Airtel, MTN Group and Orange Money Group to make credit decisions for each loan application by drawing on non-traditional data points such as GSM records and mobile wallet transaction data. Jumo's technology leverages an unconventional digital credit model that does not require customers to have prior financial account ownership or a credit history. Loan decisions are automated and the digital credit application process happens instantly over a mobile device with no need for in-person interactions.

In May 2017, the firm was selected for class 4 of Google's Launchpad Accelerator alongside 5 other African companies. In July 2017, Amazon EC2 founder, Chris Pinkham, joined the board as an active independent director of the company.
