= AFG Bank =

Ivorian bank

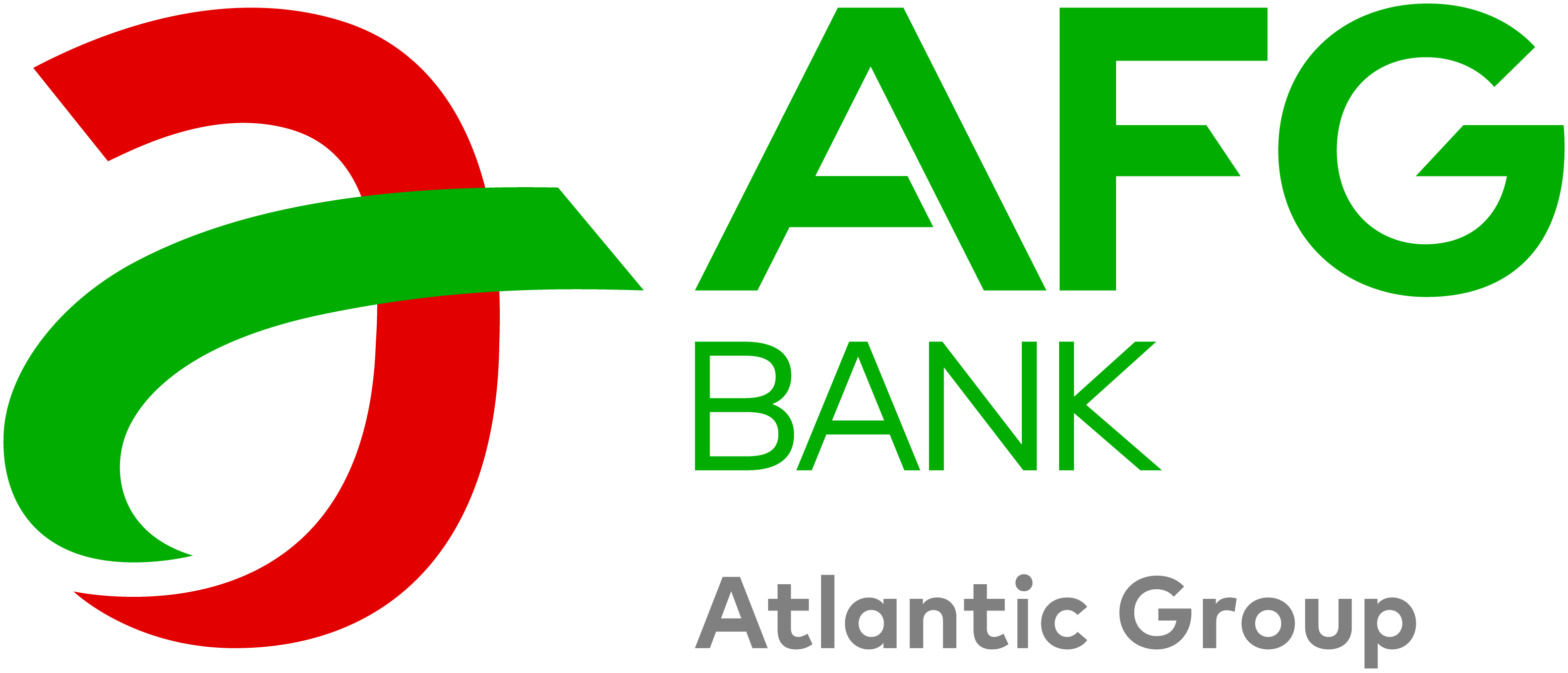
- Type: Private bank
- Industry: Financial services
- Founded: 1978
- Headquarters: Abidjan, Ivory Coast
- Number of locations: 150 (2025)
- Area served: West Africa
- Key people: Kouakou Abissa (Chairman); Sionlé Yeo (CEO)
- Total assets: USD 4,9 billion (2025)
- Number of employees: 2300 (2025)
- Website: www.afgbank.com

AFG Bank, (Atlantic Financial Group) is a major Ivorian bank. It operates as a bank in nine African countries. It also offers Insurance services.

Gabon is the bank's largest market, where it operates more than 20 branches and where it reports total assets of 1.4 trillion CFA francs.

== History ==
In 1978, a group of Ivorian investors acquired the Ivorian operations of the French bank Crédit Industriel et Commercial. In 1992, they acquired Barclays in Côte d'Ivoire.

In 1997, the group decided to create Compagnie Bancaire de l'Atlantique Côte d'Ivoire, a subsidiary of Banque Atlantique. The decision to merge the two banks was made on June 20, 2008. This merger put an end to the confusion that existed among some customers regarding the group's various banking brands in Côte d'Ivoire. The merger became effective on January 2, 2009.

In 2012, the group sold the majority of its banking assets to Banque Populaire. At that time, many believed the group would permanently withdraw from the banking sector to focus on industry and telecommunications. Far from stopping, the group reorganized under the banner of Atlantic Financial Group (AFG).

In December 2020, AFG Bank signed an agreement with BNP Paribas to acquire its operations in the Comoros, Madagascar (through the acquisition of BNI Madagascar), Gabon (through the Banque Internationale pour le Commerce et l'Industrie du Gabon), and Mali (through BICIM).

In 2024, AFG acquired a majority stake (over 76%) in Access Microfinance. The acquisition concerned only the African subsidiaries. Thanks to this acquisition, the group expanded its footprint to Liberia, Rwanda, and Zambia.

In August 2025, AFG acquired all of Société Générale Guinée's shares (approximately 57.9%), as well as its entire customer portfolio and staff. On December 23, 2025, the bank changed its name to AFG Bank Guinée.

== International operations ==
- Benin: (AFG Assurance).
- Cameroon: (AFG Bank Cameroun and AFG Assurance).
- Comoros: (AFG Bank Comores; Wholesale banking and AFG Assurance).
- Ivory Coast: (AFG Bank Côte d'Ivoire and AFG Capital CMAC through BRVM).
- Gabon: (AFG Bank Gabon).
- Guinea: (AFG Bank Guinée).
- Madagascar: (AFG Bank Madagascar; Wholesome banking and AFG Assurance).
- Mali: (AFG Bank Mali and AFG Assurance).
- Mauritius: (AFG Capital Maurice, through Stock Exchange of Mauritius).

== See also ==
- List of banks in Ivory Coast
