= Banque Nationale de Développement Agricole =

Bank of Mali

- Industry: Financial services
- Founded: 1981
- Headquarters: Avenue Du Mali, ACI 2000-BP 2424, Bamako, Mali
- Key people: Ibrahim Bassy Coulibaly (Chairman)
- Number of employees: about 360
- Website: www.bnda-mali.com

Banque Nationale de Développement Agricole (BNDA) is a development bank founded in 1981 and located in Bamako, Mali. Beside providing common banking services, it focuses on financing services for:

- agricultural inputs
- agricultural production equipment and infrastructure
- village infrastructure and water
- marketing of cereals and vegetable products
- agro-industry.

The bank was focused on the cotton production, financed with the help of the Compagnie Malienne pour le developpement des textiles (CMDT), but since the end of a special status for development banks, it works as an ordinary commercial bank.

== See also ==
- List of banks in Mali
