= Cogebanque =

Rwandan bank

- Type: Private bank
- Industry: Financial services
- Founded: 1999
- Defunct: 2023
- Fate: Become: Equity Bank Rwanda Limited
- Headquarters: Kigali, Rwanda
- Key people: Jean-Bosco Ndikubwimana (Chairman); Guillaume Habarugira (CEO)
- Revenue: RWF 9,06 billion (2021) (USD 9 million)
- Total assets: RWF 260 billion (2021) (USD 255 million)
- Owner: Attijariwafa Bank (80%); (2016–2023)
- Website: www.cogebanque.co.rw

Cogebanque (Compagnie Générale de Banque), sometimes referred to as Cogebank, was a Rwandan commercial bank. It was one of the commercial banks in the Republic of Rwanda, licensed by National Bank of Rwanda, the national banking regulator. In 2023, Cogebanque was acquired by Equity Group Holdings.

== Overview ==
As of December 2014, the bank's total assets were valued in excess of US$192.2 million (RWF:134 billion), with shareholders' equity valued at US$19.65 million (RWF:13.7 billion).

== History ==
Cogebanque was established in July 1999 by forty-two private Rwandan investors. At that time, the insurance company Compagnie Générale d'Assurance et de Reassurance, was the largest shareholder, with 34 percent ownership. In the beginning, the bank's emphasis was Small and Medium Enterprises (SMEs), agriculture and the service industries.

In 2008, three new international investors paid US$6 million for a 40 percent ownership in the bank. The new investors included: (a) ShoreCap International (SCI) of Chicago, Illinois, United States; (b) the Belgian Investment Company for Developing Countries (BIO) and (c) AfricaInvest, an investment company based in Tunisia. These transactions, initiated in 2008, were concluded in early 2010. The original Rwandan investors maintain a 60 percent shareholding in the restructured bank.

== Acquisition ==
In June 2023, Equity Group Holdings signed an agreement to acquire 91.9 percent shareholding in the stock of Cogebanque for a consideration of RWF:54.68 billion (approx. US$44 million). The shares to be sold are now owned by (a) Government of Rwanda (b) Rwanda Social Security Board (c) Sanlam Vie Plc and (d) Ms Judith Mugirasoni. Equity Group has plans to eventually buy the remaining 8.1 shareholding in the bank. The deal requires regulatory approval by regulators in COMESA, Rwanda and Kenya, as well as shareholders in Cogebanque and Equity Group Holdings.

The acquisition deal closed on 30 November 2023, with Equity Group Holdings paying US$47 million for 99.125 percent shares of stock of Cogebanque. More minority shareholders agreed to sell under the original contract price executed in June 2023. Under a separate agreement, Equity Group agreed to buy the Cogebanque headquarters building for KSh1.4 billion (US$9.2 million) within one year from the completion of the transaction.

In January 2024, having acquired 99.8 percent of Cogebanque, Equity Group began the process of merging Cogebanque with Equity Bank Rwanda. The process is expected to last six months and will lead to the new combined bank, with 47 brick-and-motor branches, 56 ATMs, and 6,000 banking agents across the country. The combined entity will be known as Equity Bank Rwanda and will employ about 700 staff.

== Branch network ==
As of March 2015, Cogebanque maintained branches at the following locations:

1. Cogebanque Headquarters – Centenary House, KN 4 Avenue, Kigali
2. Rond-Point Branch – BIB Trading Building, KN 1 Round About, Kigali
3. Rubangura Branch – Rubangura House, KN 2 Street, Kigali
4. Nyabugogo Branch – Chez Manu Building, KN 1 Road, Kigali
5. Nyarutarama Branch – MTN Centre, KG 9 Avenue, Kigali
6. Gisozi Branch – Companion House, KG 33 Avenue, Gisozi, Kigali
7. Remera Branch – Nyiransengimana Justine Building, KG 11 Avenue, Kigali
8. Kicukiro Branch – Inind House, Kigali
9. Rwamagana Branch – Rusirare Jacques Building, Rwamagana, Eastern Rwanda
10. Kabarondo Branch – Cogebanque Building, Kabarondo, Eastern Rwanda
11. Huye Branch – Bihira Juvenal Building, Butare, Huye District, Southern Rwanda
12. Nyamagabe Branch – Kanimba Building, Nyamagabe, Southern Rwanda
13. Muhanga Branch – Mukantabana Speciose Building, Gitarama, Southern Rwanda
14. Musanze Branch – Economat Diocese Building, Ruhengeri, Northern Rwanda
15. Rubavu Branch – Munyandekwe Issa Building, Rubavu, Western Rwanda
16. Kamembe Branch – Twizeyimana Vincent Building, Kamembe, Western Rwanda
17. Tyazo Branch – Kagorora Jacques Building, Tyazo, Southern Rwanda
18. Nyagatare Branch – Karangwa House, Eastern Rwanda
19. Prestige Banking Branch – Centenary House, Kigali.

== See also ==
- List of banks in Rwanda
- Economy of Rwanda
