= Vista Bank Group =

Banking group in Africa

Vista Bank

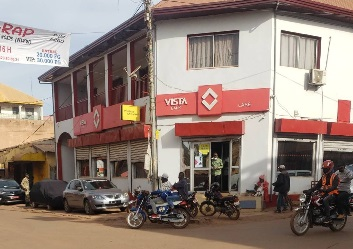
- Agency in Ouagadougou
- Company type: Private bank
- Industry: Financial services
- Founded: 2021; 5 years ago
- Headquarters: Burkina Faso
- Area served: Burkina Faso, Chad, Gambia, Guinea, Mozambique, Sierra Leone,
- Key people: Simon Tiemtoré (Founder and controlling shareholder), Yao Kouassi (Chief Executive Officer)
- Products: Banking services
- Website: vistabankgroup.com

Vista Bank is a banking group that operates across several African countries, controlled by Burkina Faso-born financier Simon Tiemtoré. It has been described as one of a new cohort of multinational banking groups in Africa, together with Coris Bank.

== History ==
In 2016, Tiemtoré set up a holding company in New York City, Lilium Capital, through which he acquired the distressed First International Bank (FIBank), a lender based in the Gambia with operations in Guinea and Sierra Leone, which he renamed Vista Bank in 2021.

In 2020, Vista Bank announced its acquisition of the stakes held by BNP Paribas in two banks, BICIGUI in Conakry, Guinea and BICIAB in Ouagadougou, Burkina Faso. BICIGUI was renamed Vista Guinée (VistaGui) in July 2021.

In August 2023, Vista announced an agreement to acquire a majority stake in distressed multinational banking group Oragroup based in Lomé, Togo, but the acquisition process failed to obtain regulatory approval and was eventually terminated after a year.

In November 2023, Yao Kouassi, who had served as a senior adviser at Vista Group Holding, was appointed Chief Executive Officer of Vista Bank Group.

In December 2023, Vista announced the acquisition of Société Générale's majority stakes in its respective subsidiaries in Burkina Faso and Mozambique. The latter transaction was finalized in August 2024.

In March 2026, the bank acquired the Agricultural and Commercial Bank of Chad.

== See also ==
- Coris Bank
- Banque Internationale pour le Commerce et l'Industrie
- List of largest banks in Africa
