= CBAO Groupe Attijariwafa Bank =

Bank in Senegal

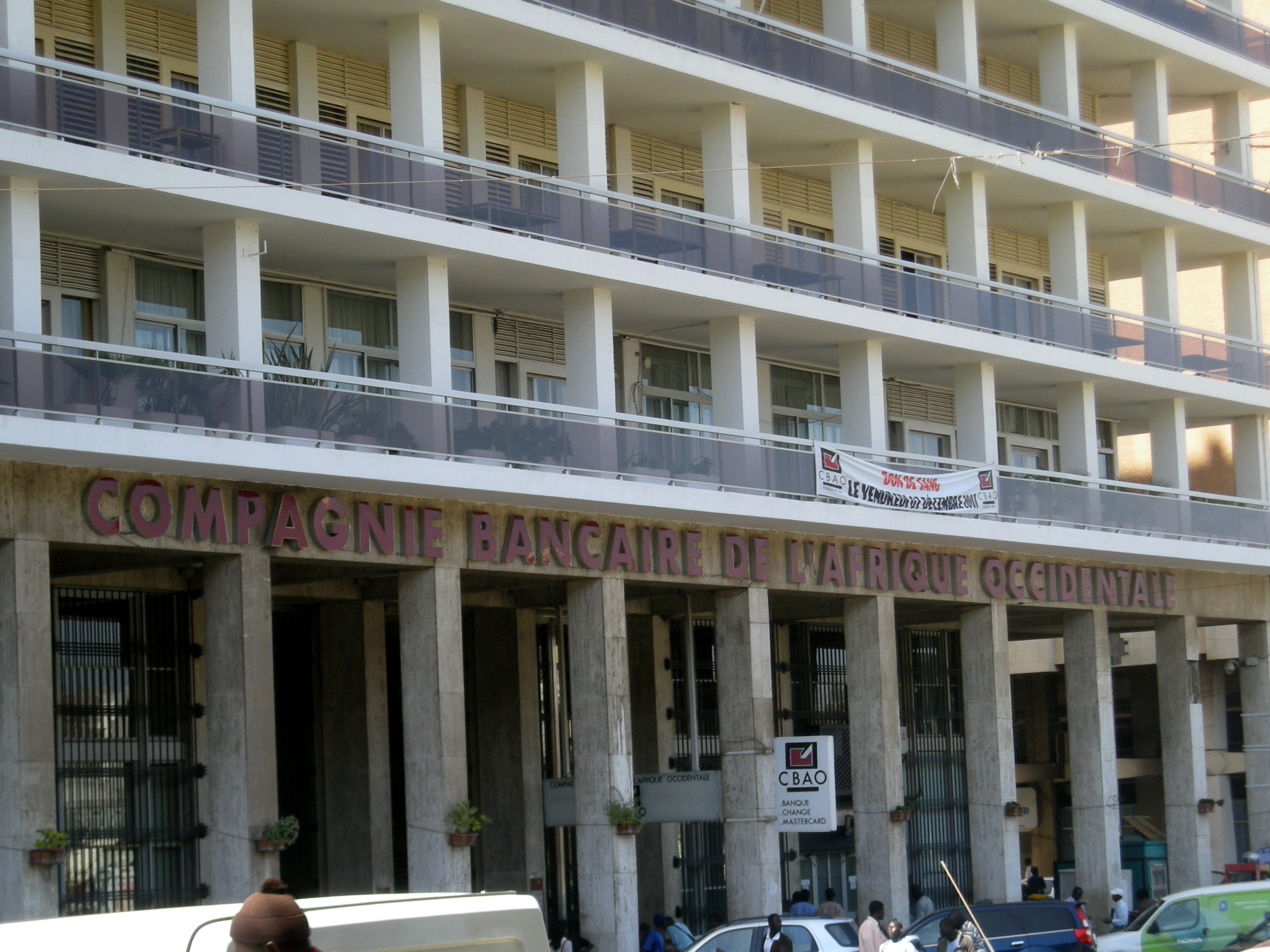
CBAO Bank headquarters at the Place de l'Indépendance, Dakar, January 2008.

The Compagnie Bancaire de l'Afrique Occidentale (CBAO, lit. 'Banking Company of West Africa') is a bank headquartered in Dakar, Senegal. With a history going back to the establishment of the Banque du Sénégal in 1853, it was purchased in November 2007 by Morocco-based Attijariwafa Bank.

== Overview ==
In 1989, the Senegalese operations of the Banque Internationale pour l'Afrique Occidentale were liquidated into several private institutions, with a majority share of the largest going to the Senegalese-owned Mimran Group. These were reorganized in 1993 as the CBAO, with its equity held by the Mimran Group (75 percent), other local private shareholders (16 percent), and the Senegalese government (9 percent).

In 2007, the Moroccan Attijariwafa bank bought a majority stake of the CBAO. As of December 2007, the CBAO had a capitalisation of 11 billion, 450 million CFA Francs. Attijariwafa bank owned 79.15%, 9% was retained by the government of Senegal, and 12% was held by other private investors. In 2008, CBAO absorbed the previously existing Attijari Bank Senegal, also majority-owned by Attijariwafa Bank and which had absorbed the country's fifth-largest bank, Banque sénégalo-tunisienne (BST), in 2006.

CBAO operates as a private retail and commercial bank entirely within Senegal. As part of the Attijariwafa Bank Group, it also opened operations of its own in Burkina Faso in 2011, Niger in 2013, and Benin in 2015.

== See also ==
- List of banks in Senegal
