= Wafabank =

Private bank in Morocco

- Formerly: Compagnie Marocaine de Crédit et de Banque (1904-1985)
- Company type: Private
- Industry: Banking
- Founded: 1904; 121 years ago
- Defunct: 2004
- Fate: Merged with Banque Commerciale du Maroc to form Attijariwafa Bank
- Headquarters: Casablanca, Morocco

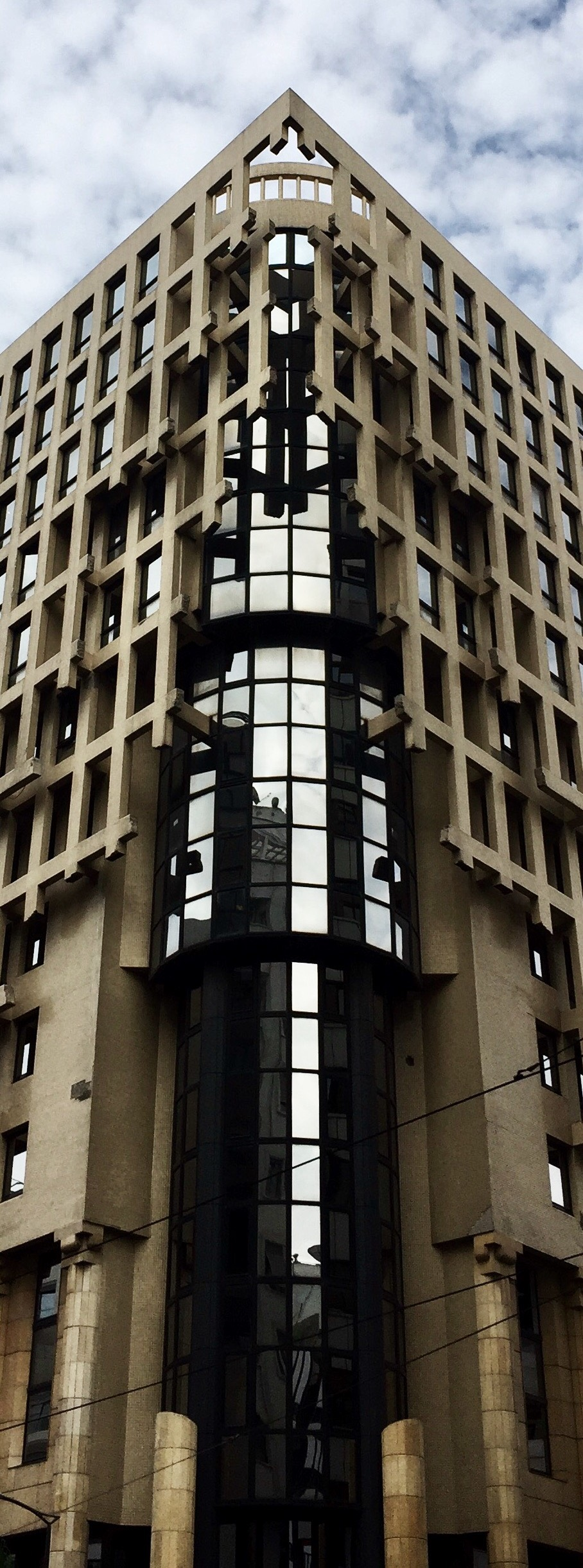
Head office of Wafabank, erected in the mid-1980s on a design by architects Hafid El-Awad & Aziz Lazrak

Wafabank was a private bank in Morocco. Which had established its first Moroccan branch in Tangier in 1904, later complemented by branches in Casablanca and other Moroccan cities. By 1959, Wafabank had 38 branches in Morocco, the largest network in the country.

In 1964, the Moroccan operations became an autonomous subsidiary of the Compagnie Algérienne, named Compagnie Marocaine de Crédit et de Banque (CMCB). In 1968, a group of Moroccan private investors acquired majority control of the CMCB, together with the Suez Company. In 1985, CMCB changed its name to Wafabank.

In 1986, Wafabank moved its head office from Tangier to Casablanca. In 1987 it established a subsidiary in Belgium. In 1993 it carried out an initial public offering.

In 1996, Wafabank acquired Banco Bilbao Vizcaya (BBV)'s subsidiary Uniban, and BBV took an 8 percent stake in Wafabank. Credit Agricole Indosuez also took a 14.8 percent stake in Wafabank. In 2000 Wafabank and Keur Khadim, a Senegalese holding company, agreed to establish Senbank to provide banking services in the Economic Community of West African States (ECOWAS). In 2001, Wafabank acquired BBVA's subsidiary BBVA Maroc and BBVA (the successor of BBV) increased its stake in Wafabank to 10 percent, further cementing the partnership commenced in 1997.

In 2004, the Kettani family that owned Wafabank at the time sold their stakes to ONA Group, which resulted in the merger with Banque Commerciale du Maroc to form Attijariwafa Bank.

== See also ==
- List of banks in Morocco
