= Banque de Développement du Mali =

Bank of Mali

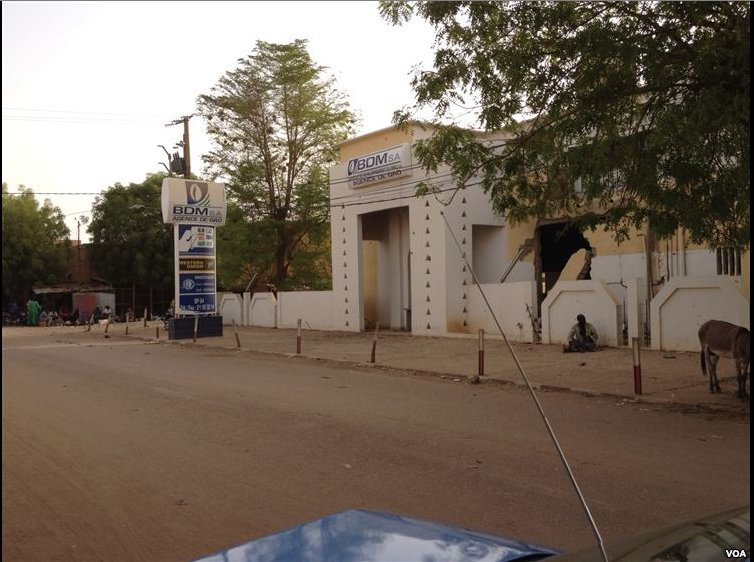
BDM branch in Gao, destroyed during the 2012 conflict in Mali

The Banque du Développement du Mali (lit. 'Development Bank of Mali') is a bank in Mali.

By the late 2010s, its main shareholders were Banque Marocaine du Commerce Extérieur (32.4 percent), the Malian state (19.6 percent), The Malian Chamber of Commerce and Industry (17.9 percent), and the West African Development Bank (16.0 percent).

== See also ==
- List of banks in Mali
