= Banque Transatlantique =

French bank

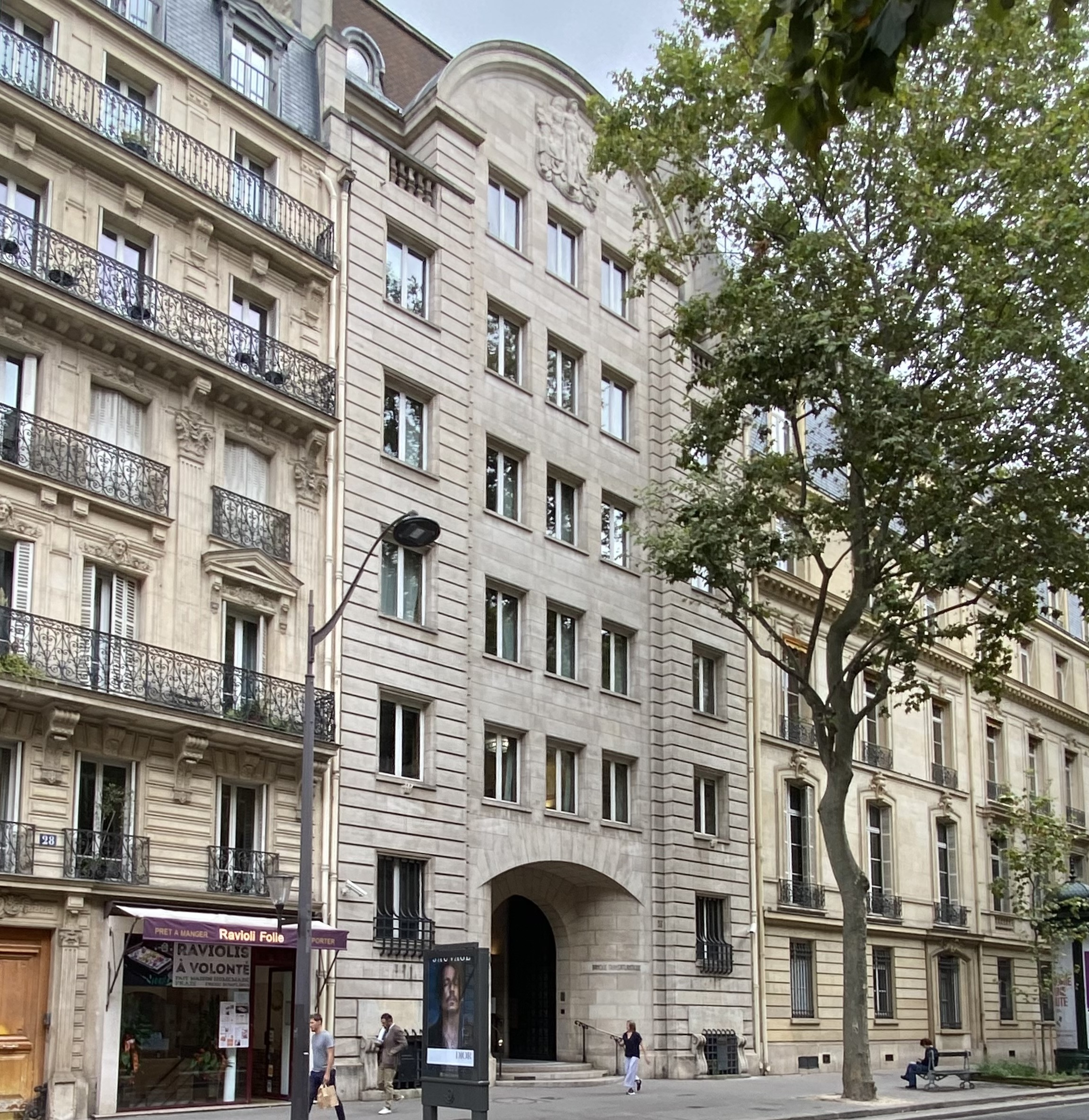
Building at 26, avenue Franklin D. Roosevelt in Paris, headquarters of Banque Transatlantique since 2000

The Banque Transatlantique (French pronunciation: [bɑ̃k tʁɑ̃zatlɑ̃tik], lit. 'Transatlantic Bank') is a French bank that was founded by Eugène Pereire in 1881, and remains as one of France's oldest private banks. Its ownership was acquired in 1941 by Crédit Industriel et Commercial (CIC) in the context of the Vichy anti-Jewish legislation. Today, it serves as CIC's wealth management arm, which is itself part of the Crédit Mutuel Group.

Banque Transatlantique is headquartered in Paris and has subsidiaries in Brussels and Luxembourg (which was established in 2002), a branch in London, and representative offices in Geneva, Hong Kong, Montreal, New York, Singapore and Washington, DC. It has a strong focus on serving expatriates, diplomats and international civil servants.

== History ==
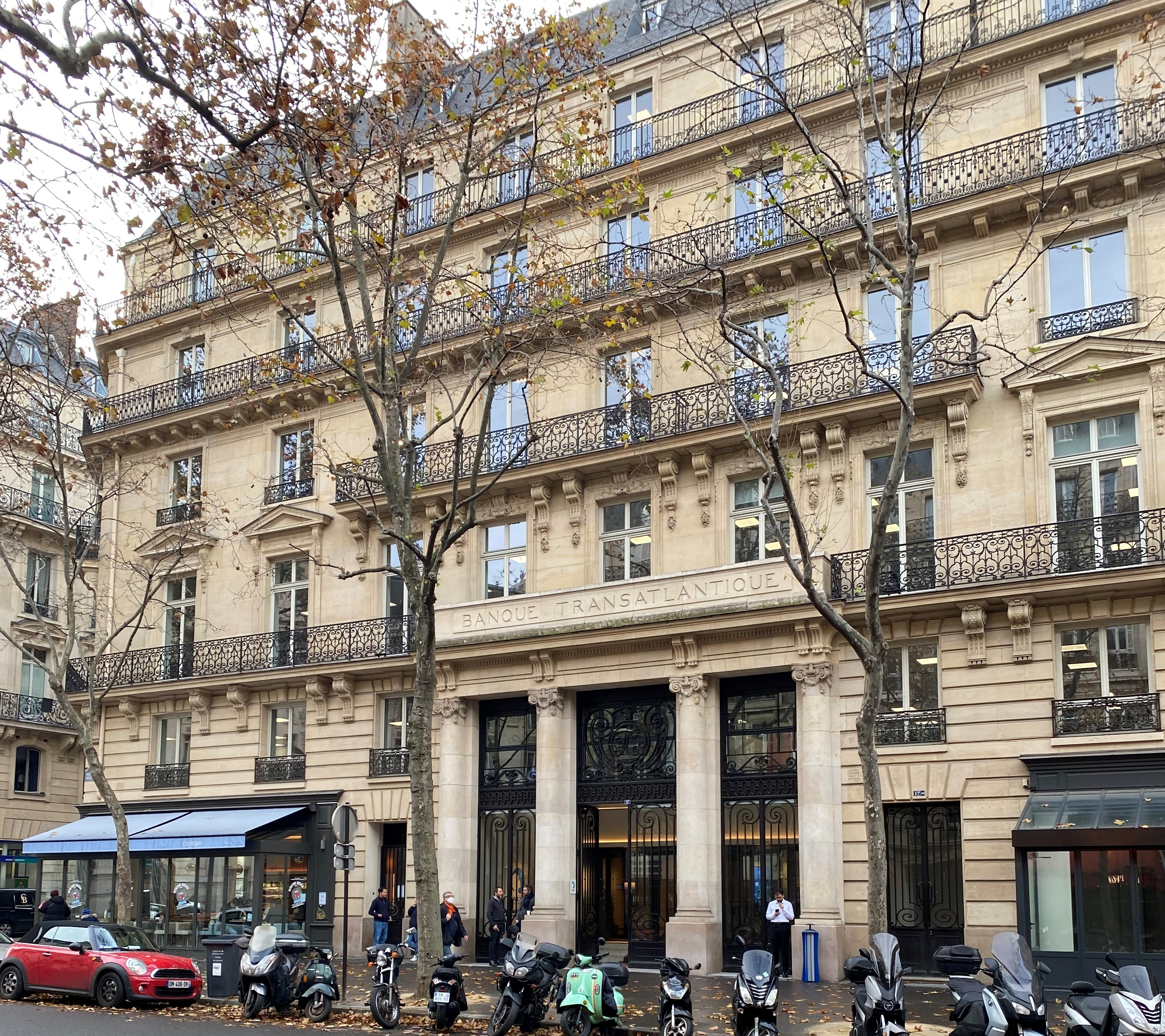
Former headquarters of Banque Transatlantique at 17, boulevard Haussmann in Paris; more recently headquarters of Danone

=== Founding and Development ===
Eugène Pereire, heir of much of the Pereire brothers' family business, founded Banque Transatlantique in 1881; it had 609 shareholders and total assets in excess of 50,000,000 francs. He created the bank in response to the French government's decision to cease state funding of transatlantic ventures. Thus, Pereire formed a private bank to complement his main management stake in the shipping line Compagnie Générale Transatlantique, which his father and uncle had founded in 1855 as the Compagnie Générale Maritime.

Pereire envisioned a "Saint-Simonian banking philosophy" for the bank. Its mission was to promote the economic and industrial development of nations. The bank began financing enterprises both within France and abroad. The bank's largest undertakings began at the turn of the century when the new gas and electricity industries created a demand for distribution. Through the creation of energy transporting companies in Tunisia in 1884 and Morocco in 1911, the bank was able to finance the provision of gas and electricity to the capital and many surrounding regions in France. The bank also encouraged foreign investment by financing many public works projects that are still visible today, most notably in Casablanca, and by organizing a parliamentary visit to Tunisia in 1883. In 1884, Banque Transatlantique founded the Banque de Tunisie on the base of a pre-existing agency.

The bank is mentioned in Alfred Nobel's will.

The bank continued to expand abroad, not without some drama. In 1902, eruption of Mount Pelée in Martinique destroyed its branch in Saint-Pierre, Martinique. In 1911, the bank led the creation of the Banque Commerciale du Maroc.

=== World War I, the Great Depression and World War II ===
Conscription during World War I halved the bank's staff. Still, by the end of the war it had developed new investment strategies and positions in Africa through the African Commerce Bank. During the 1920s, Banque Transatlantique experienced a period of expansion with the creation of a real estate company in the Opera quarter and the acquisition of Union Financiere.

Despite the Great Depression, the bank was able to make some strategic moves. A key acquisition, in 1933, was the purchase of Dosseur et Cie. This bank specialized in serving the banking needs of French diplomats. (Note: Dosseur et Cie. was one of three banks that the Quai d’Orsay would recommend to French diplomats. The other two were Flury-Hérard and Banque Central pour l'Etranger.) The acquisition would in time provide the bank with a new direction. For many years thereafter Banque Transatlantique maintained an office in the Foreign Ministry on the Quai d'Orsay in Paris and branches, even if only a room in a consulate, in every outpost where the diplomats and officers, doctors and schoolmasters who represented France overseas, had personal business that needed a banker's attention. The bank also helped found the Antwerp Diamond Bank in 1934.

In step with modernization, Banque Transatlantique sponsored several grand expositions highlighting the technological innovations of the age such as The International Exposition of Science and Technology in Modern Life (1937). Though The Great Depression spared none, the bank's clients included, Banque Transatlantique managed to stay afloat and, furthermore, experience significant growth.

In 1941, CIC acquired control of BT, together with two subsidiaries, Banque de Tunisie and Banque Commerciale du Maroc. This occurred in response to the German Occupation in France requiring the liquidation of Jewish firms. Instead of liquidating, the bank allowed the CIC to take a majority stake in the bank, and after the war, welcomed back its former Jewish employees who went abroad.

However, integrating into the CIC meant that the bank had to abandon its status as a commercial bank and could no longer operate branches that would compete with CIC's branches. the bank therefore concentrated on two lines of business. On the one hand it became a merchant bank serving financial, commercial, and industrial companies. On the other hand, it turned its attention to individual clients. The Bank became known as "the Diplomat’s Bank" as it focused on providing services to French expatriates and foreign nationals living in France.

=== The 1950s to the 1980s: new directions ===
While the CIC was establishing branches in Paris and the surrounding regions, Banque Transatlantique was turning its attention abroad, striving to improve its services to diplomats and foreign nationals by: - expanding its clientele to include teachers, industry consultants, technicians, expatriated business executives, etc. - The creation of a specialized department providing services such as wealth management and French and foreign real estate investment.

After 1968 Banque Transatlantique began to increase its presence in the international arena. Philipe Aymard opened the bank's capital to foreign investors wishing to establish a presence in Paris but not necessarily a subsidiary or branch, thereby establishing a number of links or alliances. A number of international banks bought stakes in Banque Transatlantique. Bank of Montreal in 1968 took a 5% stake. Four Nordic banks currently hold a 10% stake, with a "revolving" administrator representing them in council, and Credito Italiano purchased a 20% holding in 1974 from CIC.

=== The 1980s: Specialization ===
Banque Transatlantique's relationships with its clients evolved dramatically in the 1980s to better address their needs in an increasingly complicated and globalized financial system. The crises resulting from the Yom Kippur War (1973) and the Iranian Revolution (1979) were beginning to abate as the organization of international monetary policy began to shift because of the dollar's decline as a concerted effort on the parts of central banks in the United States, Japan, Germany, France, and Great Britain in addition to the decline in the price of crude oil because oil producing countries ceased augmenting the price.

It was within this context that France decided it needed to address its relatively pitiful level of investment and encourage banks to shift towards providing services. In response and to better meet the needs of a growing clientele, in 1986 Banque Transatlantique established a representative office in London, where a very large French community is present to this day. Next, it created the Helder Immobilier company in 1989 so that its internationally mobile clients could manage, research, buy, and sell real estate across the world. Banque Transatlantique also began focusing more on its individual clients through offering personalized retirement products and tailored insurance. At the same time the bank maintained its original services such as cash flow and database management for firms.

By the end of the 1980s, Banque Transatlantique had expanded its roster of representative offices with an office in Singapore, as well as a desk on the island of Jersey. It had also created and sustained several new investment institutions such as GTI (Cash Management Services for Companies); Banque Transatlantique Monaco, specializing in providing investment services for French nationals living in Africa and throughout the Mediterranean; and four investment companies (Short Term Arbitrage, Options and Performance, First Arbitrage, and Secure Arbitrage).

=== The 1990s: Crisis and Recovery ===
The early 1990s turned out to be a difficult decade for banks. Banque Transatlantique responded by placing more emphasis on its role as the bank for individuals living abroad by expanding its international scope. In 1995 it established its Washington, DC representative office and a new German department. Two years later it opened an Australian desk; two years after that it opened a representative office in Sydney, Australia that it later closed.

In alliance with Credito Italiano, the bank offered a wide range of services and benefits to both businesses and individual clients. In addition, the bank further focused on expatriates by promoting its relationship with the Alliance française and supporting a host of cultural activities from seminars to the opening of an International French School in Philadelphia.

The difficulties the 1990s presented for Banque Transatlantique largely involved issues of wealth management. This was one factor behind the bank setting up a trust company on the island of Jersey. A severe drop in housing prices caused the bank significant losses in its subsidiary UFICO, which became Transat Finance in 1997. Still, profitability in other areas, agreements between the banks and a network of English real estate companies, and the bank's partnership with the agency AICI allowed the bank to stay solvent.

Switching over to the Euro in 1998-1999 cost the bank an estimated 15.2 million francs. The bank worked with its clients to help them through this transition by providing software to prevent credit risks imposed by both the currency switch and the millennium bug as well as by offering new information systems based in euros.

=== The new millennium ===
In 2000 the bank transferred its headquarters to 26, Avenue Franklin D. Roosevelt. Two years later the bank acquired the wealth management service BLC Gestion. Then it purchased a 60% stake in Mutual Bank Luxembourg, which specializes in private wealth management services.

Then, in 2008, after 25 years in London, Banque Transatlantique upgraded its representative office there to a branch. The next year, saw the bank establishing a Financial Advisory company in Singapore and a representative office in New York.

== Current operations ==
Today, Banque Transatlantique seeks to develop and expand its services in several key areas:

1. International Asset Management: Transat Online enables clients to bank remotely. Transat Expat Santé provides health insurance coverage abroad. Lastly, Cap Transat provides a set of tailored banking and investment products to meet the needs of an internationally managed account.
2. French Nationals Living Abroad: Services for expatriates remains one of the bank's core products. For instance, Transat-Service provides room reservations, vacation planning, social integration, etc.
3. Private Wealth Management: The bank offers private wealth management, and since 2002, has operated a subsidiary, It has also created new mutual fund products and offers life insurance products.
4. Stock Option Plans Management: In 2000 the bank created StockPlan, which helps firms manage employee stock option plans. Today, StockPlan manages stock options plans of 60 groups representing over 130 companies and almost 45,000 employees worldwide.
5. Business Market: The bank offers company HR departments services tailored to expatriates. The bank helps organize the transfer of salaries to anywhere in the world and can organize bank accounts both in France and abroad. The bank created a department in 2006 solely dedicated to company senior executives.

== Head offices ==
The bank's head office was initially located at 25, boulevard Haussmann in the building of Compagnie Générale Transatlantique. In the late 19th century it moved to 6, rue Auber, and later to a purpose-built headquarters nearby at 17, boulevard Haussmann, now the head office of Danone; and relocated in 2000 to its current location, an iconic art deco building designed by Joseph Marrast for the Banque Dupont (now also part of the CIC Group), with metalwork by Raymond Subes.

== Presidents of the Banque Transatlantique ==
- Eugène Pereire (1881–1906)
- Henri Durangel (1906–1909)
- Salomon Halfon (1909–1923)
- Auguste Thurneyssen (1923–1931)
- Georges Despret (1931–1940)
- Charles Dangelzer (1940–1970)
- Philippe Aymard (1970–1986)
- François de Sieyes (1986–1992)
- François Blanchard (1992–1993)
- Jean-Maurice Pinquier (1993–1998)
- Christiane Gonin (1998–2000)
- Guy-Vincent Audren de Kerdrel (2000–2005)
- Bruno Julien Laferrière (2005–)

== Footnotes ==
Notes

Citations
