= Banque Malienne de Solidarité =

Malian bank

The Malian Solidarity Bank (French: La Banque malienne de solidarité or BMS-SA) is a Malian company created in 2002 through an initiative of President Alpha Oumar Konaré. This socially activist bank, based on a Tunisian model, has the struggle against poverty and unemployment as its main objective.

The housing bank, founded in 1996, has services which include financing, coordination, and support for small businesses or private individuals, particularly those from disadvantaged groups. The bank offers loans at favorable conditions, asking for less collateral and a lower interest rate than other banks. It also acts as a savings bank.

In November 2021, Lanfia Coulibaly succeeded Alioune Coulibaly at the head of the Malian Solidarity Bank.

In 2004, the bank had seven branches throughout Mali, as well as a capital of four billion Central African Francs. The bank has branch offices in Bamako, Segou, Kayes, Koulikoro, Kidal, Mopti, and Sikasso.

== See also ==
- List of banks in Mali
