= Banque Commerciale du Maroc =

Commercial Bank of Morocco

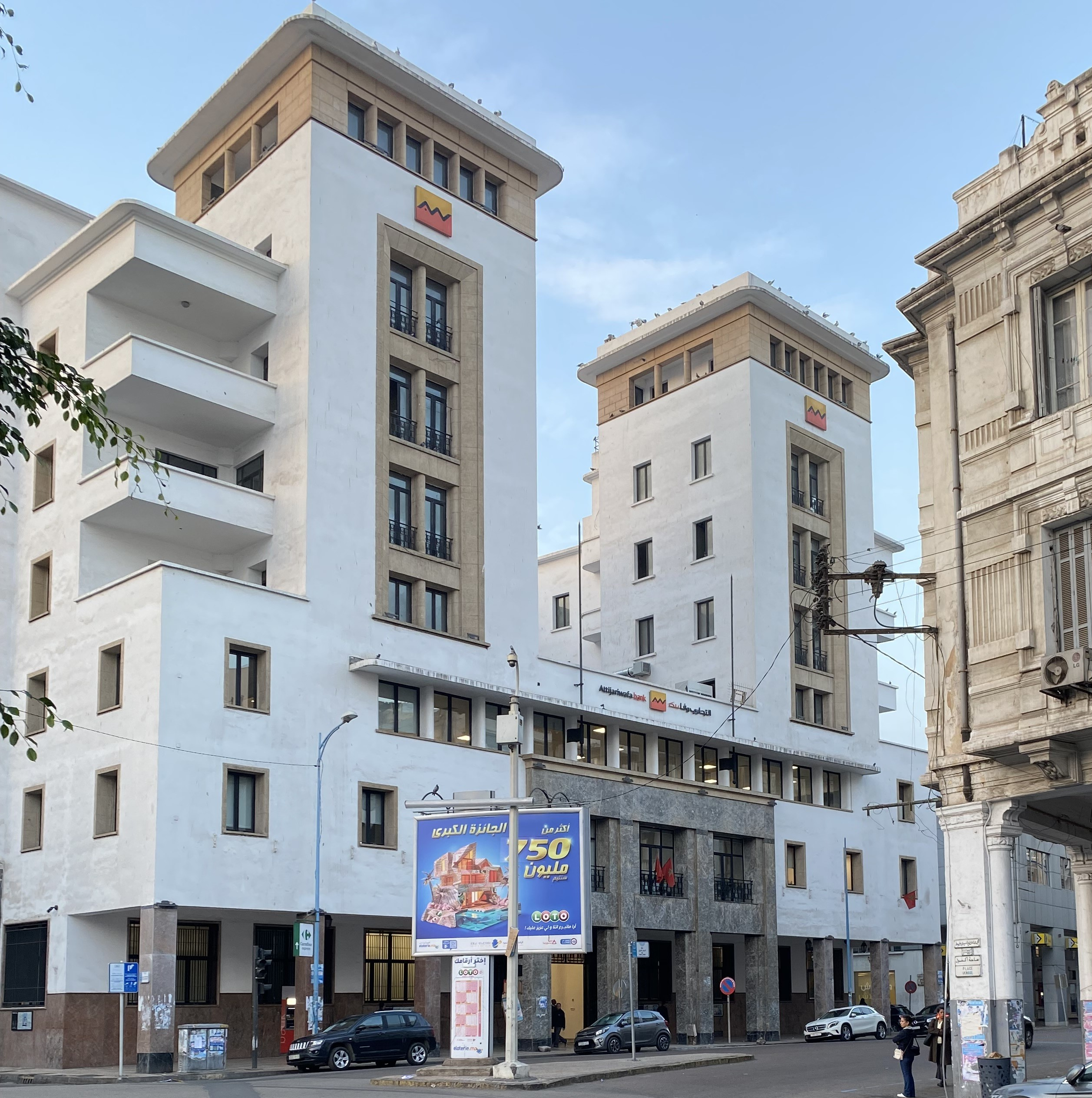
- Former head office building erected in 1930
- Industry: financial service activities, except insurance and pension funding
- Founded: 1911
- Defunct: 2004
- Fate: Merged with Wafa Bank to form Attijariwafa Bank
- Headquarters: Casablanca

Banque Commerciale du Maroc (BCM, Arabic: البنك التجاري المغربي, "Commercial Bank of Morocco") was a bank founded in 1911, shortly ahead of the establishment of the French protectorate in Morocco. The bank was initially controlled by France's Banque Transatlantique, then from 1941 by the Crédit Industriel et Commercial, and from 1988 by Morocco's ONA Group. In 2004, it merged with Wafa bank to form Attijariwafa Bank.

== History ==
The BCM was established in 1911 by Banque Transatlantique together with its Tunisian subsidiary, the Banque de Tunisie. Its registered office was located in Paris, first at 10, rue de Mogador, a site later absorbed into the Galeries Lafayette, and from 1925 at Banque Transatlantique's head office at 17, Boulevard Haussmann. Its main Moroccan office was in Casablanca.

The bank opened a branch in Tangier in 1913. After World War I, it extended its network to Rabat and Mazagan, and later, in the late 1920s, to Marrakesh and Fez.

In 1941, BCM was acquired, along with Banque Transatlantique and Banque de Tunisie, by Crédit Industriel et Commercial (CIC), which benefited from the conditions created by the Vichy anti-Jewish legislation. In 1963, after Morocco's independence in 1956, the country introduced a policy of national control over the banking sector, known in French as marocanisation. As part of that process, BCM's registered office was transferred from Paris to Casablanca. The same year, Deutsche Bank acquired 10% of the bank's equity capital.

A further capital increase in 1969 led to a greater Moroccan shareholding in BCM. By the late 1970s, it had become the largest private bank in Morocco, behind only the state-controlled BMCE and Crédit Populaire du Maroc.

In June 1988, ONA Group acquired 25% of BCM's equity through a capital increase, thereby becoming its controlling shareholder. CIC's stake was reduced to 10.6%.

By 1999, BCM's capital stood at 1,325,000,000 Moroccan dirhams, divided into 13,250,000 shares. In 2002, Wafabank had capital of 639,482,700 Moroccan dirhams. The two banks announced their merger in November 2003 and completed it in 2004, through a friendly all-share transaction based on an exchange ratio of seven BCM shares for eight Wafabank shares.

== Casablanca head office ==
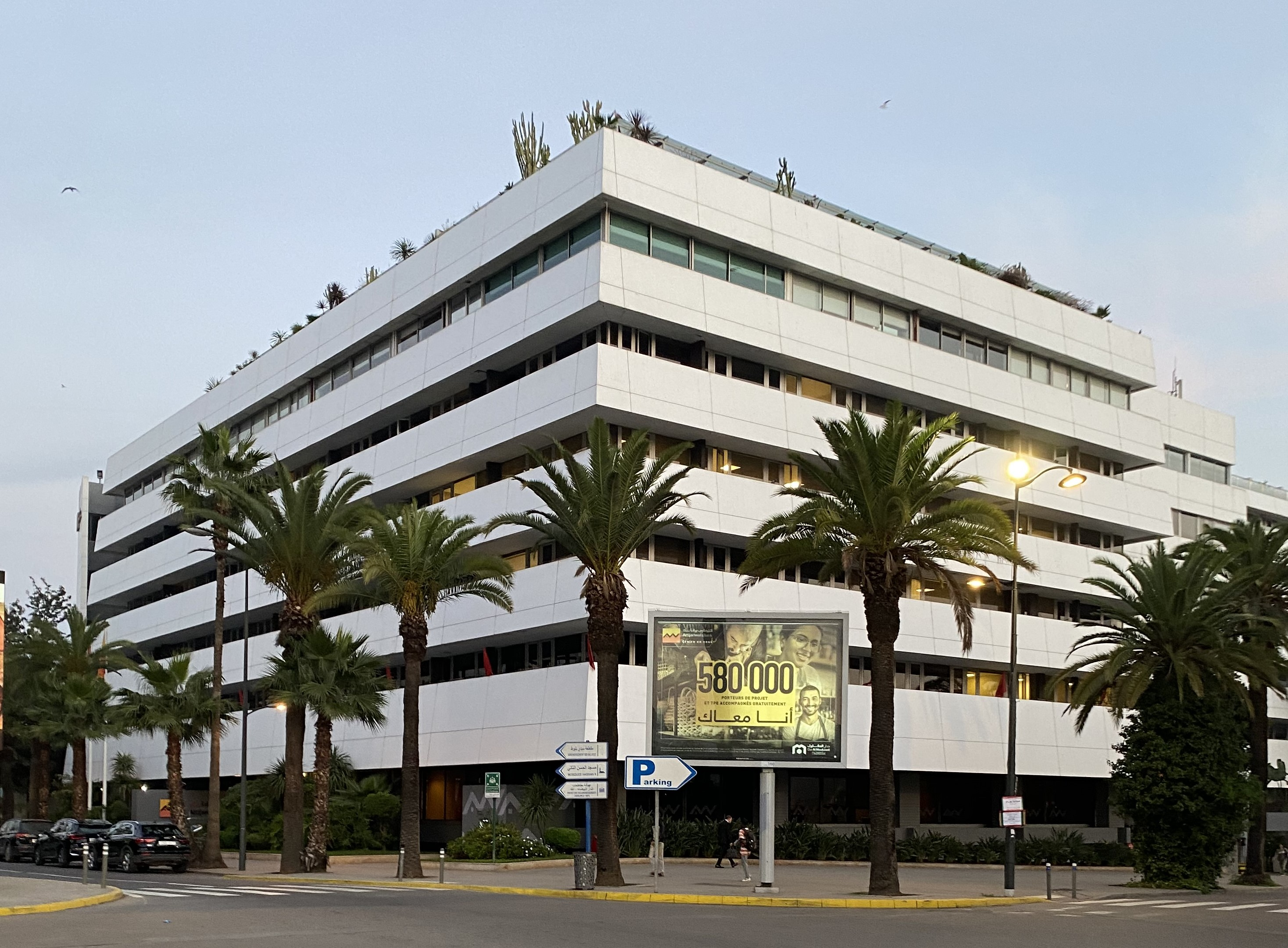
New BCM head office building, inaugurated in the early 1980s

In Casablanca, the BCM's head office relocated several times. In 1921, it moved to a building designed by architect Edmond Gourdain on the newly traced boulevard du 4e Zouaves, later renamed boulevard Houphouët-Boigny, just north of the recently erected office of the State Bank of Morocco. The building was shared with the affiliated shipping company, the Compagnie Générale Transatlantique. Both these buildings, of the BCM and of the State Bank, have since been demolished.

In 1930, the BCM moved to a building designed by Marius Boyer on 1, rue Galliéni, now rue Driss Lahrizi. The iconic art deco structure, also known as the Lahrizi building, was renovated in 2021.

In the 1970s, under the leadership of its charismatic president Abdelaziz El Alami Hassani, the BCM erected a new pyramid-shaped head office building at 2, Boulevard Moulay Youssef, near the Arab League Park. This became the headquarters of Attijariwafa Bank following the 2004 merger.

== See also ==
- List of banks in Morocco
