= Coris Bank =

Banking group in Africa

Coris Bank International

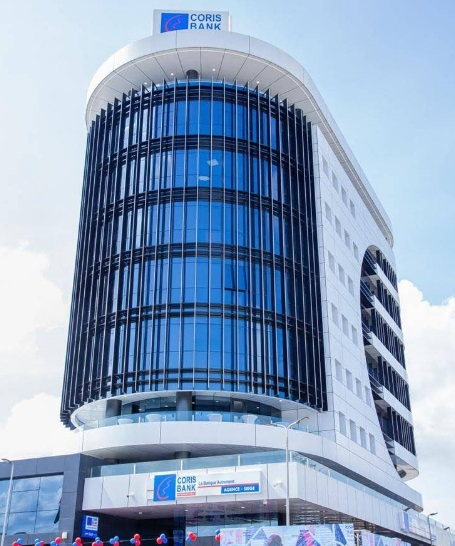
- Bank Headquarters in Ouagadougou
- Trade name: Coris Bank
- Type: Private bank
- Industry: Banking, financial services
- Founded: January 2008
- Founder: Idrissa Nassa
- Headquarters: Ouagadougou, Burkina Faso
- Area served: West and Central Africa
- Key people: Idrissa Nassa (Chairman)
- Parent: Coris Holdings
- Website: coris.bank

Coris Bank, also known by the acronym CBI (for Coris Bank International), is a banking group in Africa with head office in Ouagadougou, Burkina Faso. By 2024, it had the largest branch network in Burkina Faso. It has been described as one of a new cohort of multinational banking groups in Africa, together with Vista Bank.

== History ==
Coris Bank was founded in January 2008 in Ouagadougou. As of 2016, 70 percent of its equity was held by Coris Holdings, an entity established in 2013 in Burkina Faso and controlled by financier Idrissa Nassa. By 2024, that stake had declined to 63.6 percent. Coris Holdings is part of the Coris Group, a conglomerate that also has operations in telecoms, mining, and manufacturing.

Coris established a subsidiary in Guinea in 2021. In March 2022, it established a branch in Guinea-Bissau. In December 2023, it acquired the retail banking operations of Standard Chartered in Ivory Coast. In January 2024, it completed the acquisition of the 67.8 percent stake held by Société Générale in its subsidiary in Chad. The acquisition of Société Générale's subsidiary in Mauritania, announced at the same time in 2023, was delayed by a more complex regulatory approval process. Coris Bank also has operations in Benin, Mali, Niger, Senegal, and Togo.

The third largest banking group in the West African Monetary Union (UMOA, for l’Union monétaire ouest-africain) with a market share of almost 10%, as of May 2025, Coris Bank international is present in eight West African Economic and Monetary Union (UEMOA, for Union Économique et Monétaire Ouest-Africaine) countries, as well as in Guinea, Chad and Cape Verde.

== See also ==
- Vista Bank
- Banque Internationale pour le Commerce et l'Industrie
- List of banks in Africa
