= Attijariwafa Bank =

Moroccan banking company

Attijariwafa bank

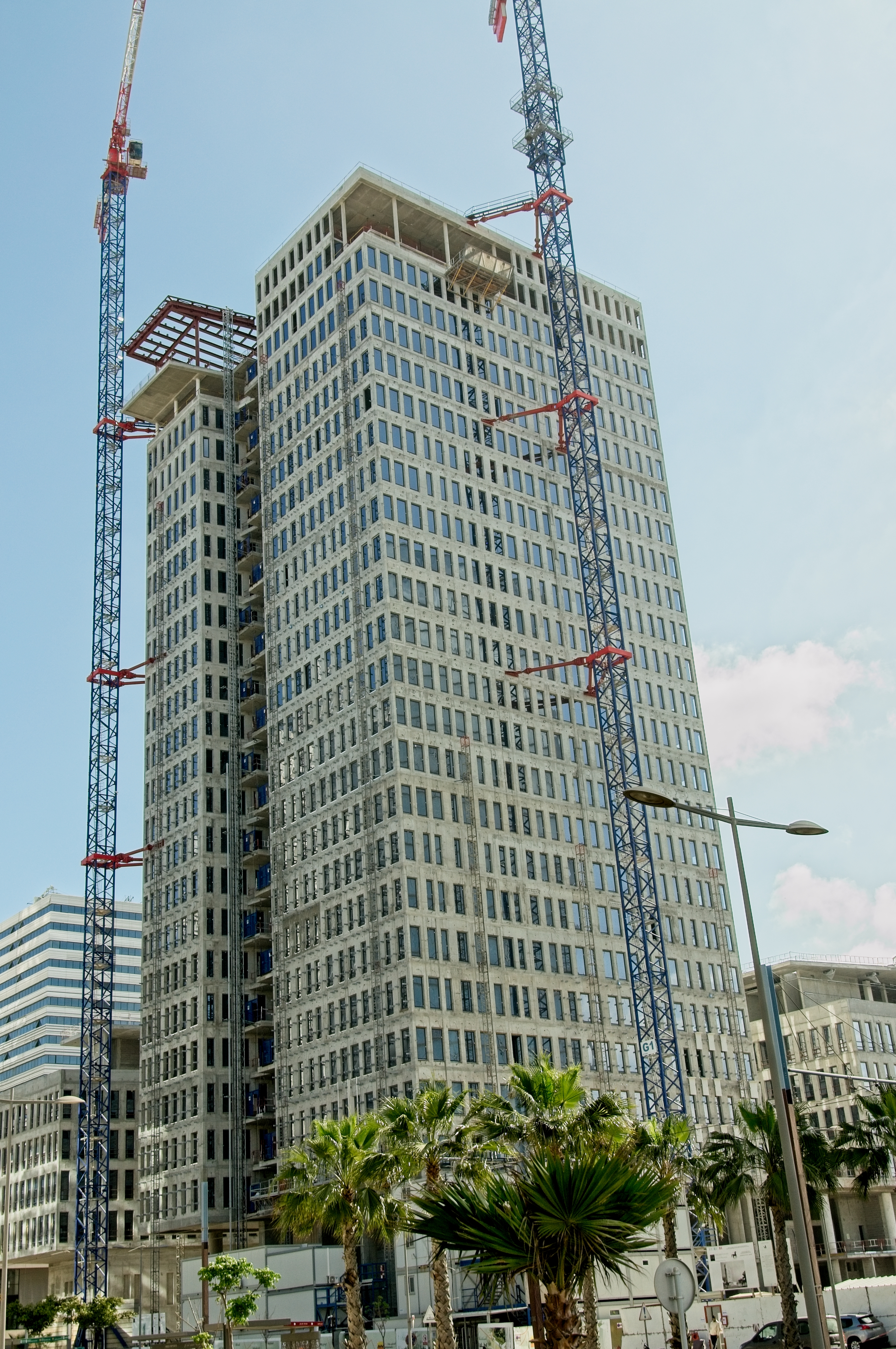
- Borj Attijari, Casablanca, under construction in April 2023
- Type: Public bank
- Traded as: CSE: ATW
- Industry: Banking
- Founded: 1904; 122 years ago
- Headquarters: Casablanca, Morocco
- Number of locations: 4,930 branches (2018)
- Key people: Mohamed El Kettani (CEO)
- Products: financial services
- Revenue: MAD 12,5 billion (2025) (USD 1,35 billion)
- Total assets: MAD 795 billion (2025) (USD 85,84 billion)
- Number of employees: 22,052 (2025)
- Subsidiaries: Wafa Assurance; Wafasalaf; Wafa Immobilier
- Website: www.attijariwafabank.com

Attijariwafa bank is a Moroccan international financial services group headquartered in Casablanca. It was established through the merger of Banque Commerciale du Maroc (BCM) and Wafabank, creating one of the largest financial institutions in the country. Since the merger, Attijariwafa Bank has consistently ranked as the leading bank in Morocco by assets and market share.

Attijariwafa Bank operates an extensive international network, with a strong presence across North, West, and Central Africa, as well as representative offices and subsidiaries in Europe and Asia. Its expansion into sub-Saharan Africa has been a key component of its growth strategy since the mid-2000s.

As of the early 2020s, Attijariwafa Bank ranked among the largest banking groups in Africa by Tier 1 capital, placing it within the top five African banks according to international financial rankings.

The bank is listed on the Casablanca Stock Exchange and is majority controlled by Al Mada, a Moroccan investment holding company owned by the Moroccan royal family.

== History ==
The present-day Attijariwafa Bank was formed in 2004 through the merger of two Moroccan banking institutions, Wafabank and Banque Commerciale du Maroc (BCM). Wafabank traced its origins to 1904, when the Compagnie Française de Crédit et de Banque opened a branch in Tangier; after several reorganizations, it adopted the Wafabank name in 1985. BCM was created in 1911, following the establishment of a Banque Transatlantique branch in Tangier, and later developed into a commercial banking group in Morocco. The 2004 merger brought together the branch networks and operations of both banks under the name Attijariwafa Bank.

In 2005, Attijariwafa Bank, in consortium with Banco Santander, acquired 54% of Banque du Sud in Tunisia, which was later renamed Attijari Bank. In Senegal, the group obtained a banking licence in 2005 and began its own operations the following year. It then acquired a 67% stake in Banque Sénégalo-Tunisienne (BST), then the country's fifth-largest bank, in January 2007. In April 2008, it acquired a 79% stake in the Compagnie Bancaire de l'Afrique Occidentale, which was merged in December of that year with its other Senegalese operations under the name CBAO Groupe Attijariwafa Bank.

The group continued its expansion in West and Central Africa in the following years. In November 2008, it acquired a 51% stake in Banque internationale pour le Mali (BIM), which had been established in 1980 in Bamako. In late 2009, it acquired Crédit Agricole operations in four countries: Crédit du Congo, established in 2002 in Brazzaville; Union Gabonaise de Banque (UGB), established in 1962 in Libreville; Société Ivoirienne de Banque (SIB), established in 1962 in Abidjan; and Crédit du Sénégal, established in 1989 in Dakar. In December 2010, Attijariwafa Bank partnered with BCP Group to acquire an 80% stake in BNP Paribas Mauritanie, established in 2006 in Nouakchott. It subsequently purchased a 51% stake in Société Commerciale de Banque Cameroun, established in 1989 in Yaoundé, and, in September 2013, a 55% stake in Banque Internationale pour l'Afrique au Togo in Lomé. In 2017, it acquired the former Barclays subsidiary in Egypt. During the same period, the group also established operations in Guinea-Bissau in 2008 and, through its Senegalese subsidiary CBAO, in Burkina Faso in 2011, Niger in 2013 and Benin in 2015.

By the end of 2018, Attijariwafa Bank operated in 15 African countries and had a network of more than 4,300 branches, which the group described as the most extensive on the continent.

On 8 November 2022, Attijariwafa Bank entered into a partnership with Union Bank of Nigeria as part of its African expansion strategy.

On 10 August 2023, the bank launched a payment service using Apple Pay.

At the end of 2023, the group's activities in Africa outside Morocco accounted for around one quarter of its total assets. The largest shares came from Tunisia, with 5.6%; Egypt, with 4.7%; Côte d'Ivoire, with 4.1%; and Senegal, with 3.8%.

Attijariwafa Bank was ranked 14th in Forbes Middle East's 30 Most Valuable Banks 2025 list. It was also ranked 26th in Forbes Middle East's Top 100 Listed Companies 2025 list.

In May 2026, Attijariwafa Bank announced the launch of Simple, described as Morocco's first full-scale neobank, with subscription tiers for users.

== International Operations ==
- Benin: (CBAO Groupe)
- Burkina Faso: (CBAO Groupe)
- Cameroon: (SCB Cameroun)
- Chad: Began operation in 2022.
- Republic of the Congo: (Crédit du Congo)
- Egypt: In 2016 Attijariwafa Bank acquired all assets of Barclays in Egypt.
- Gabon: (Union gabonaise de banque)
- Ivory Coast: (Société ivoirienne de banque)
- Mali: (Banque internationale pour le Mali)
- Mauritania: Began operations in 2010.
- Niger: (CBAO Groupe)
- Senegal: (CBAO Groupe and Crédit du Sénégal)
- Togo: (BIA Togo).
- Tunisia: (Attijari Bank)

=== Former participations ===
- Rwanda: (Cogebanque) 2016-2022 Sold to Equity Group.

== Leadership ==
Mohamed El Kettani has been chairman and CEO of Attijariwafa Bank since 2007. Abdelaziz Alami was honorary chair as of 2013.

== Ownership ==
As of late 2013, the main shareholders of Attijariwafa Bank were Al Mada (47.77%), Moroccan cooperative insurers MCMA-MAMDA (8.09%), Government-owned Caisse de dépôt et de gestion (4.26% via RCAR and 2.31 directly), Santander Group (5.27%, via Santusa Holding), and other Moroccan institutional investors (CIMR 2.34%, CMR 2.27%, Axa Maroc 1.37%, RMA-Watanya 1.32%), plus 6.61% held by the group's own insurance arm Wafa Assurance and 4.54% held by its employees. By end-2023, the group's ownership structure had remained substantially stable, with Al Mada's share slightly lower at 46.5%.

== See also ==
- List of largest banks in Africa
- List of banks in Morocco
