= Orange Money =

Money transfer service

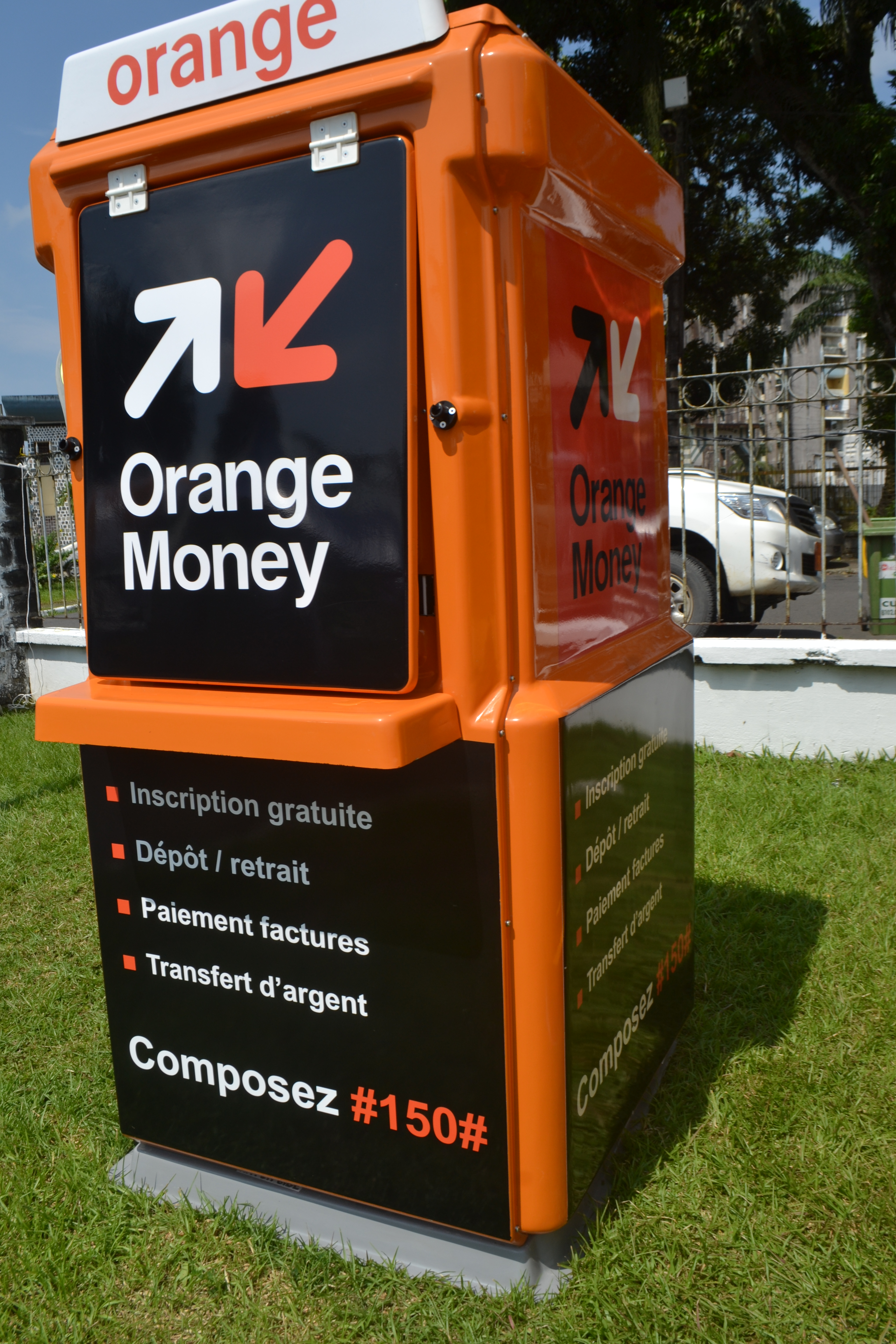
Orange Money kiosk in Cameroon

Orange Money is the mobile phone based money transfer service of French telecom company Orange S.A., available in most of the group's affiliates in Africa. Its users can deposit money into an account linked to their mobile phone number, and then access a range of services, in particular transferring money domestically and internationally, paying bills and buying airtime top-up.

Since June 2016, the service has been available in France, where it enables international money transfer to Côte d'Ivoire, Sénégal and Mali.

== History ==
Orange Money was rolled-out for the first time in December 2008, in Côte d'Ivoire, with basic services: cash-in and cash-out, airtime top-up, Orange bills payment. After a quiet launch, Orange organised a wide-ranging advertising campaign in Côte d'Ivoire in 2009 gaining between 100,000 and 150,000 subscribers in a year. The planned roll-out for Mali and Senegal was delayed however, and had still not happened in January 2010, when competitor MTN announced its own deployment in fifteen African countries.

In 2011, Orange Money reached three million subscribers and was launched in Senegal, Madagascar, Mali, Niger, Kenya, Botswana and Cameroon, and then in Mauritius and Jordan between 2011 and 2012. The service now includes water and electricity bill payment in most countries, and the possibility to access savings and insurance products. In 2013, Orange Money offered the option of making payments by VISA card and withdrawals from ATMs, a service first deployed in Botswana. By then, Orange Money was available in thirteen countries (the latest additions being Morocco, Uganda and Guinea) and counted eight million subscribers.

In September 2015 in Côte d'Ivoire, Orange launched the first African mobile crowdfunding service, dedicated to Orange Money customers.

At the start of 2016, Orange was accredited as an Electronic Money Issuer (EMI) in four countries: Côte d'Ivoire, Mali, Senegal and Guinea, and a few months later in the Democratic Republic of Congo.

In June 2016, Orange announced the launch of the service in France, with a strong emphasis on transfers to West Africa, as well as hitting the 18 million customers mark.

To ensure optimal management of its activities, Orange inaugurated CECOM (the Orange Money Centre for Compliance Expertise) in September 2016 in Abidjan. Its role is to guarantee compliance for the Orange Money service in countries with Electronic Money Issuer accreditation.

Orange Money is also a core component of "mobile money" interoperability in Africa. Telma, Orange and Airtel announced on 9 September 2016 that their respective mobile payment services are now all mutually compatible. That same month, the Orange Money offer reached 20 million customers in the Africa and Middle-East zone (up 30% in a year).

== Customer journey ==
Subscription is free, at any point of sale displaying the Orange Money signage. Customers complete a subscription form and present ID. To credit their account, users can deposit cash at an Orange Money point of sale, receive money transferred by another user or have their salary paid directly into their account (depending on the country).

Customers access the service directly from their phone, using a USSD menu. Through this menu they can check their balance, change their password and carry out all the transactions offered by the operator. These transactions are all protected by a four digit password chosen by the user. The main services are cash deposits and withdrawals, domestic and international transfers, and bill payments (water, electricity, TV, telephone, school fees). Professionals (companies and freelancers) can also receive payments via Orange Money, once they have opened a specific "commercial account".

Orange has also joined forces with banks (BNP Paribas, Ecobank, Bank of Africa, and Microcred) to enable customers with bank accounts to use their mobiles to transfer money easily and at any time between their bank account and their Orange Money account.

== Countries ==
As of October 2020, Orange Money is available in eighteen countries:

- Botswana
- Burkina Faso, under the Airtel Money brand
- Cameroon
- Central African Republic
- Democratic Republic of the Congo
- Côte d'Ivoire
- Egypt, branded as Orange Cash
- Guinea
- Guinea Bissau
- Jordan
- Liberia, under the Smile Money brand
- Madagascar
- Mali
- Morocco
- Niger
- Senegal
- Sierra Leone, under the Airtel Money brand
- Tunisia

== Competition ==
Orange Money is comparable to the M-Pesa service launched in 2007 in Kenya by Safaricom, which revolutionised the local economy with over 17 million regular users out of an adult population of 19 million. The Orange Group's other competitors in Africa for this type of service are the other pan-African mobile operators: Airtel, Millicom, MTN, and Vodacom. There are also national operators offering similar services, like Telma in Madagascar.

All these mobile money services help to improve financial inclusion on a continent where bank-based services are still the preserve of a minority of the population: the financial inclusion index stands at 34% in sub-Saharan Africa.
