= Banque Internationale pour le Commerce et l'Industrie =

Former French-owned banking network in Africa

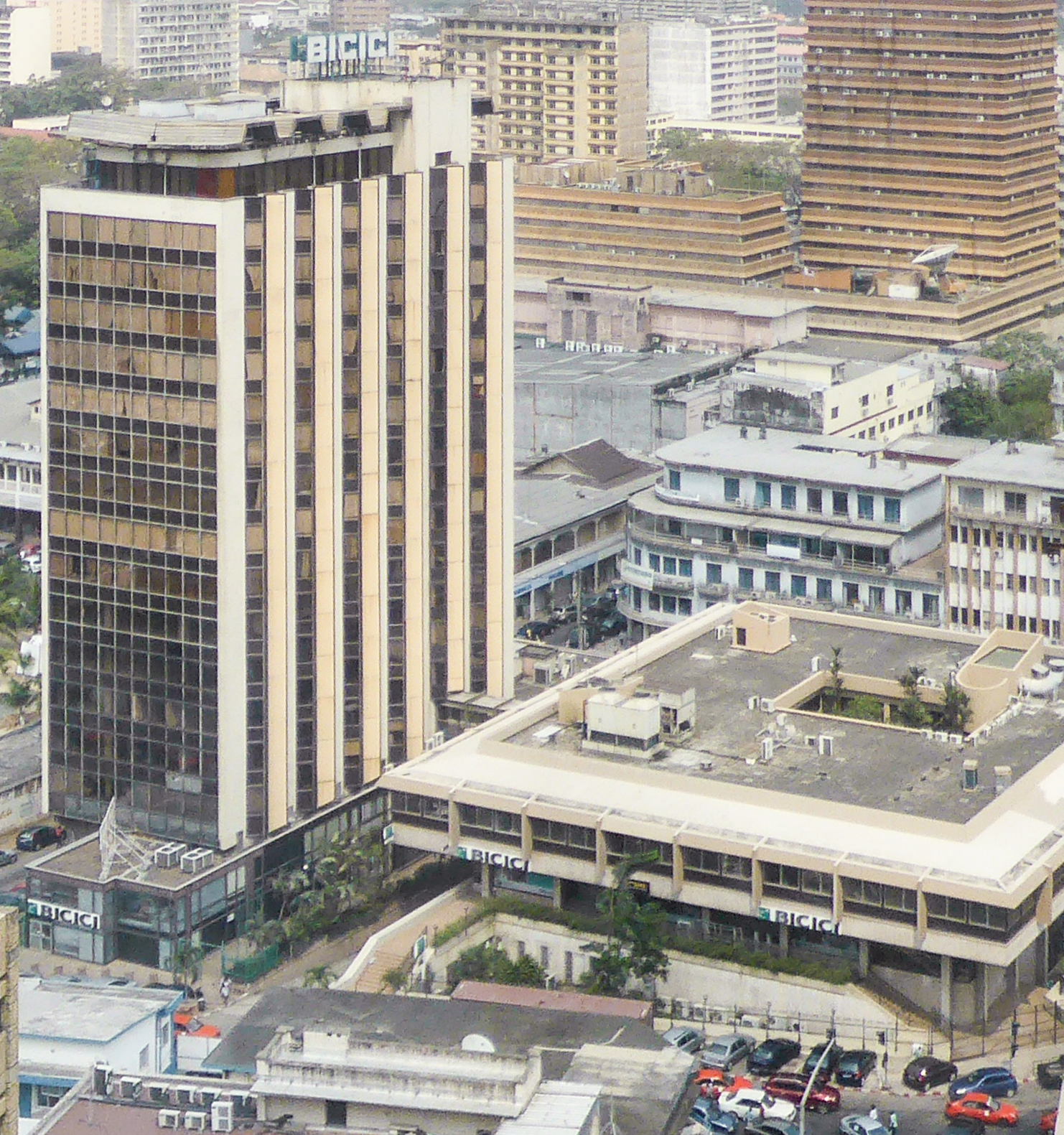
- Head office of BICICI in Abidjan (2016)
- Company type: Private bank
- Industry: Financial services
- Founded: 1962
- Defunct: 2023
- Fate: Merged
- Headquarters: Abidjan, Ivory Coast
- Services: Banking services
- Parent: Banque Nationale pour le Commerce et l'Industrie

The Banque Internationale pour le Commerce et l'Industrie (BICI) was a network of banks in sub-Saharan Africa created from 1962 onwards by Paris-based Banque Nationale pour le Commerce et l'Industrie (BNCI). Following successive mergers it was inherited by BNCI's successors the Banque Nationale de Paris (BNP, 1966–2000) then BNP Paribas (since 2000). BNP Paribas sold most of the BICI network in the early 2020s.

== History ==
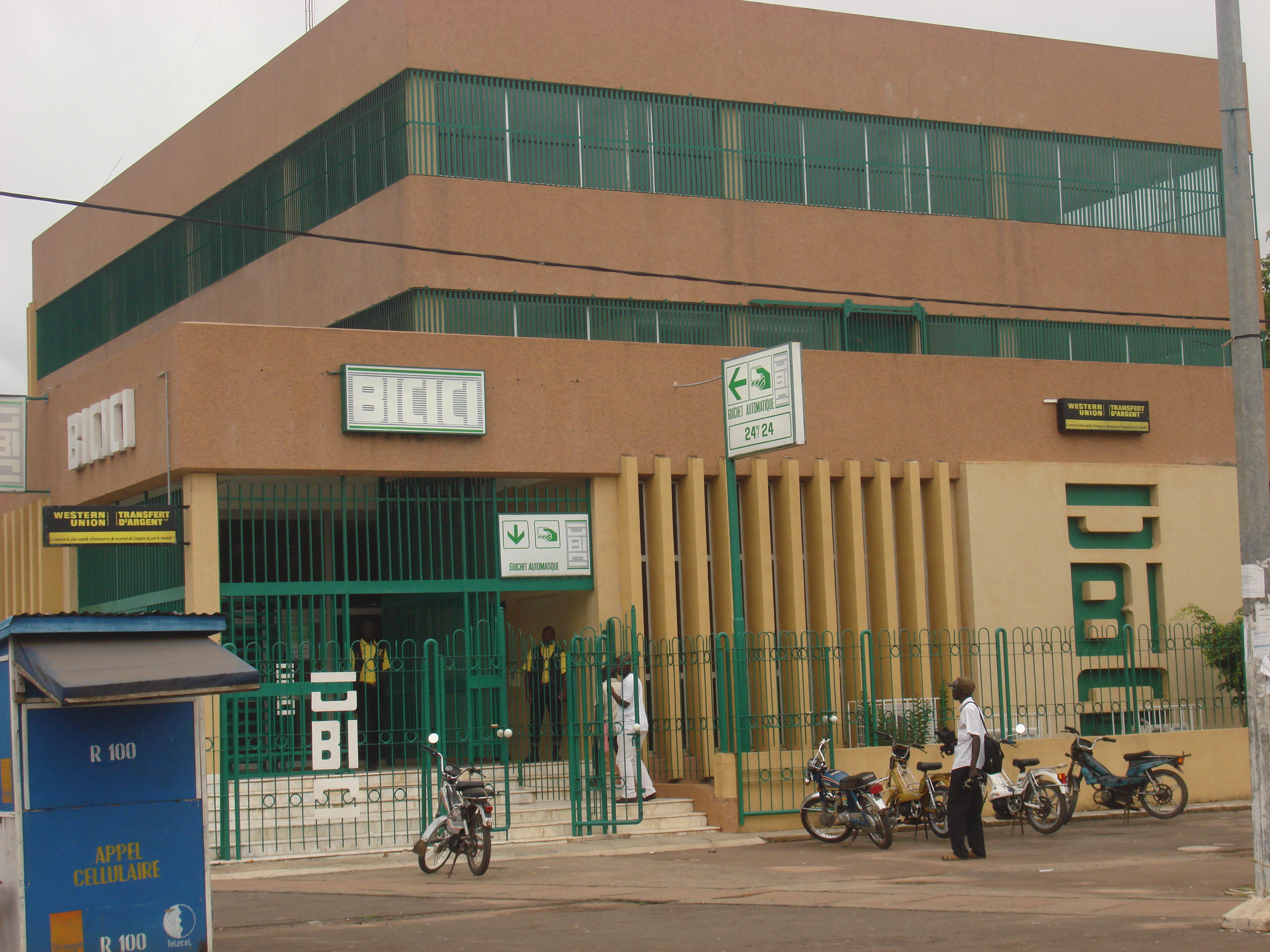
BICICI branch in Bouaké, Côte d’Ivoire

In July 1940, facing challenging prospects at home following the German invasion of France, the Paris-based BNCI acquired the Banque de l'Union Nord-Africaine (BUNA) in Algiers to develop its activity outside Europe. The BNCI renamed that bank as Banque Nationale pour le Commerce et l'Industrie en Afrique (BNCI-Afrique or BNCI-A), and opened a branch in Saint-Louis, Senegal simultaneously as another in Casablanca. More sub-Saharan branches followed in subsequent years.

Following the loi-cadre Defferre of 1956, most sub-Saharan African French colonies became independent countries by 1960, and developed their own national banking policy frameworks. In this new environment, the BNCI reorganized branches of BNCI-Afrique into fully capitalized subsidiaries whose equity capital was opened to local partners including the newly established national governments.

Thus in 1962, four stand-alone banks were created in Cameroon, the Republic of the Congo, Côte d'Ivoire, and Senegal: respectively, the Banque internationale pour le Commerce et l'Industrie du Cameroun (BICI Cameroun) in Douala, the Banque internationale pour le Commerce et l'Industrie du Congo (BICI Congo) in Brazzaville, the Banque Internationale pour le Commerce et l'Industrie de la Côte d'Ivoire (BICICI) in Abidjan, and the Banque Internationale pour le Commerce et l'Industrie du Sénégal (BICIS) in Dakar.

More creations followed in the early 1970s: the Banque Internationale pour le Commerce et l'Industrie du Gabon (BICIG) in Libreville in 1973, the Banque Internationale pour le Commerce, l'Industrie et l'Agriculture du Burkina Faso (BICIAB) in Ouagadougou also in 1973, the Banque Togolaise pour le Commerce et l'Industrie (BTCI) in Lomé in 1974, and the BICI-Tchad in N'Djamena in 1976. The Banque Internationale pour le Commerce et l'Industrie de la Guinée (BICIGUI) was founded in Conakry in 1985, the Banque pour l'Industrie et le Commerce des Comores (BICC) in Moroni in 1990, and the Banque Internationale pour le Commerce et l'Industrie du Mali (BICIM) in Bamako in 1999.

Meanwhile, in 1974 the BICI Congo was merged into a new entity, the Union Congolaise de Banque (UCB). In the mid-1980s, BICI-Tchad merged with Banque Internationale pour l'Afrique du Tchad, the local affiliate of Banque Internationale pour l'Afrique Occidentale (BIAO). In 1989, the Banque Internationale pour le Commerce et l'Industrie du Niger (BICIN) in Niamey was acquired by the Nigerien affiliate of BIAO even as the BIAO Group was experiencing financial distress. In the early 1990s, BNP exited Cameroon through a series of transactions with Bank Brussels Lambert and Dresdner Bank. In 2002, BNP Paribas withdrew from BTCI and left it in the ownership of the Togolese government, which in 2021 sold it on to the IB Bank Group led by Burkinese businessman Mahamadou Bonkoungou.

By 2012, the BICIGUI was the largest bank in Guinea. By 2019, the BICIG was the second-largest bank in Gabon.

In 2019, BNP Paribas signaled its intent to reduce its African footprint. It exited Gabon, Mali and the Comoros in 2020, Burkina Faso and Guinea in 2021, and Côte d'Ivoire and Senegal in 2022:

- the government-controlled Fonds Gabonais d'Investissements Stratégiques (FGIS) acquired BNPP's 47 percent stake in BICIG in March 2020, then sold majority control later that year to the Atlantic Financial Group (AFG) controlled by Ivorian financier Bernard Koné Dossongui;
- AFG also acquired BNPP's 85 percent stake in BICIM in December 2020 and renamed it AFG Bank Mali in May 2024;
- Also in December 2020, AFG acquired BICC;
- Separately in 2020, Vista Bank, controlled by Burkinese financier Simon Tiemtoré, announced its acquisition of BNPP's 52 percent stake in BICIGUI and BICIAB. BICIGUI was renamed Vista Guinée (VistaGui) in July 2021;
- In October 2022, a consortium of Ivorian government entities acquired BNPP's 59.8 percent state in BICICI;
- In May 2023, the SUNU Group, controlled by Senegalese financier Pathé Dione, acquired BNPP's 54 percent stake in BICIS.

== See also ==
- Banque de l'Afrique Occidentale
- Banque Marocaine pour le Commerce et l'Industrie
- Banque de Madagascar
- List of banks in Africa
- List of banks in France
