= Mareuil-sur-Aÿ =

- Delegated commune of Aÿ-Champagne
- Coat of arms
- Location of Mareuil-sur-Aÿ
- Location within France Location within Grand Est
- Coordinates: 49°02′53″N 4°01′55″E
- Country: France
- Region: Grand Est
- Department: Marne
- Arrondissement: Épernay
- Canton: Ay
- Commune: Aÿ-Champagne
- Area^{1}: 11.48 km^{2} (4.43 sq mi)
- Elevation: 89 m (292 ft)
- Population (2022): 1,067
  - Density: 92.94/km^{2} (240.7/sq mi)
- Time zone: UTC+01:00 (CET)
  - Summer (DST): UTC+02:00 (CEST)
- Postal code: 51160
- ^{1} French Land Register data, which excludes lakes, ponds, glaciers > 1 km^{2} (0.386 sq mi or 247 acres) and river estuaries.

Mareuil-sur-Aÿ (French pronunciation: [maʁœj syʁ aˑji], literally Mareuil on Aÿ) is a former commune in the Marne department in north-eastern France. Since January 2016, Mareuil-sur-Aÿ is part of the administrative commune Aÿ-Champagne. Its population was 1,067 in 2022.

The patron saint is Saint Trésain.

== Population ==
Historical population
Year	Pop.	±% p.a.
1962	1,128	—
1968	1,192	+0.92%
1975	1,075	−1.47%
1982	1,159	+1.08%
1990	1,277	+1.22%
1999	1,219	−0.52%
2006	1,139	−0.97%
2022	1,067	−0.41%
Source: EHESS and INSEE

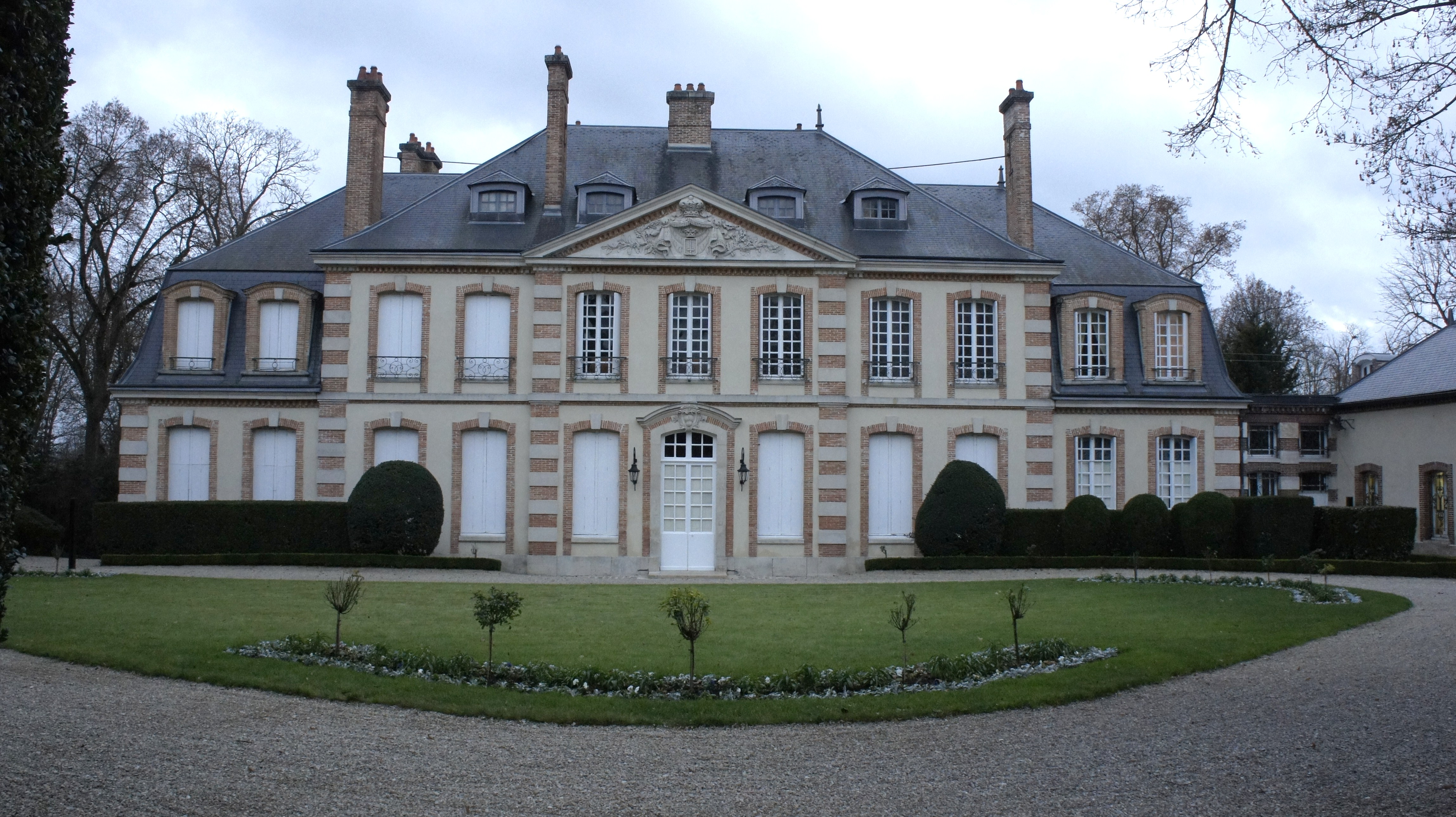
Château Montebello.

== Champagne ==
Its vineyards are located in the Vallée de la Marne subregion of Champagne, and are classified as Premier Cru (99%) in the Champagne vineyard classification. Together with Tauxières-Mutry it is the highest rated of the Premier Cru villages, and has therefore just missed out on Grand Cru (100%) status. Regardless, the vineyards, harvest huts, presses, and cellars in Mareuil-sur-Aÿ were inscribed on the UNESCO World Heritage List in 2015 as part of the Champagne hillsides, houses and cellars site, because of the region's testimony to the development of champagne.

== See also ==
- Billecart-Salmon
- Communes of the Marne department
- Montagne de Reims Regional Natural Park
