= Gosset =

Champagne wine house

General information
- Status: Active
- Location: Aÿ, Champagne, France
- Coordinates: 49.0371601°N 3.9643083°E
- Current tenants: Gosset Champagne House
- Opened: 1584
- Owner: Renaud-Cointreau Group

Gosset, founded in 1584, is the oldest wine house in Champagne. In 1584, Pierre Gosset, alderman of Aÿ and wine-grower, made still, mostly red, wines from the grapes he harvested from his own vines. In those days, two wines vied for pride of place at the table to the Kings of France: the wine of Aÿ and, from some hundreds of leagues further south, the wine of Beaune. Then, in the 18th century the wine made in around Aÿ began to bubble and the Gosset family turned naturally to the production of champagne.

== History ==
In 1994, the house was sold to the Renaud-Cointreau group (family owned and also the owners of Cognac Frapin). Under the new management, Gosset succeeded in increasing its production to one million bottles in 2005. The house is now successfully headed by Jean-Pierre Cointreau and exports 65% of its production to more than 70 countries. In 2009, as he prepared to celebrate Gosset’s 425th birthday, Jean-Pierre Cointreau took the decision to buy new premises in Epernay: 2 hectares of parkland with buildings dating back to the 19th century, 1.7 km of cellars with a storage capacity of 2.5 million bottles and a cuverie of 26,000 hectoliters. Part of the production is still in Aÿ which remains Gosset’s registered office.

== Wines ==
Gosset wines are made from a blend of Pinot noir, Chardonnay and Pinot Meunier. The house is known for its slightly sweet Brut Excellence and its vintage prestige cuvée Célebris and Grand Millésime. The house also produced a commemorative wine the Quatrième Centenaire.

- Grande Réserve Brut (Non-vintage). A blend of 46% Chardonnay, 39% Pinot noir, and 15% Pinot Meunier. 12% reserve wines with an average age of 2 years. In the 1980s, the blend had been 65% Pinot noir and 35% Chardonnay. Also available in magnum and in jeroboam (fully bottled in jeroboam from the beginning of the making)
- Grand Rosé Brut (Non-vintage). 56% Chardonnay, 35% Pinot noir Grand Cru and 9% red wines from Bouzy and Ambonnay. Also available in magnum and half bottle
- Grand Millésime Brut (Vintage, latest is 2012). 56% Chardonnay and 44% Pinot noir from grand and premier cru vineyards. In the 1980s, the blend was 60% Pinot noir and 40% Chardonnay.
- Grand Blanc de Blancs Brut (Non-vintage). Also available in magnum
- Celebris Vintage Extra Brut (latest is 2007). 64% Chardonnay and 36% Pinot noir. Vintages produced, 2007, 2002, 1998, 1995, 1990 and 1988.
- Celebris Rosé Extra Brut (Vintage, latest is 2007)
- Petite Douceur Rosé Extra Dry (Non-vintage)
- Extra Brut (Non-vintage)

== Previous wines ==
- Cuvée Quatrième Centenaire (Non-vintage Prestige Cuvée). This wine was produced in 1984 to commemorate the 400th anniversary of the foundation of Gosset and contained some wine from the 1971 vintage. It was a blend of 36% Pinot noir and 63% Chardonnay. Less than 2,500 cases were produced. Bottles were numbered. Numbers 1-200 were for the use of the Gosset family, 201-1,500 were magnums and numbers 1,501 to 2,500 were other sizes.

== See also ==
- Champagne Riots of 1911
- French wine
- List of Champagne houses
