= Sillery, Marne =

Sillery
- Commune
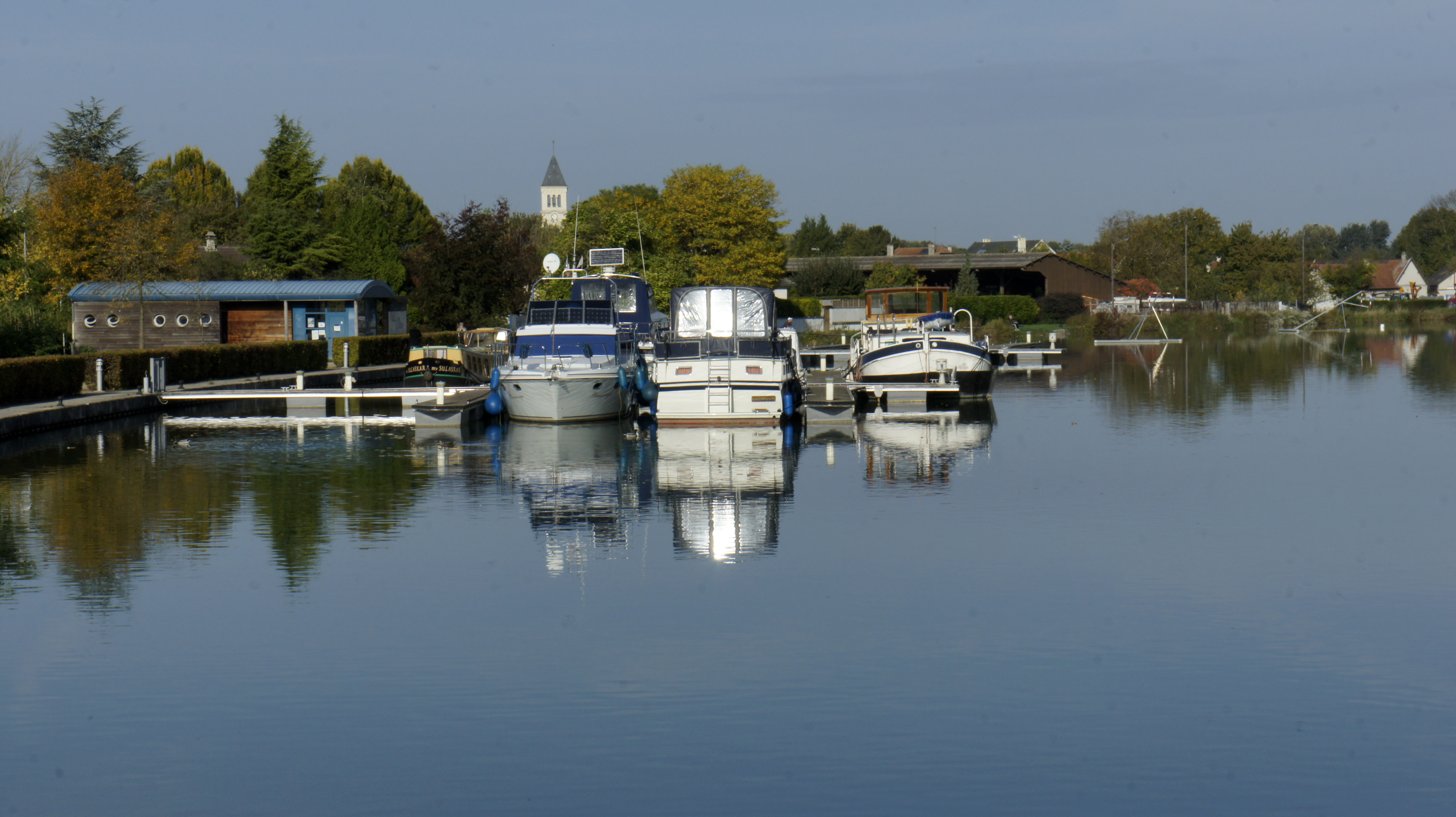
- The marina in Sillery

- Coat of arms
- Location of Sillery
- Location within France Location within Grand Est
- Coordinates: 49°11′56″N 4°07′59″E
- Country: France
- Region: Grand Est
- Department: Marne
- Arrondissement: Reims
- Canton: Reims-8
- Intercommunality: CU Grand Reims

Government
  - Mayor (2020–2026): Thomas Dubois
- Area^{1}: 9.2 km^{2} (3.6 sq mi)
- Elevation: 88 m (289 ft)
- Population (2023): 1,824
  - Density: 200/km^{2} (510/sq mi)
- Time zone: UTC+01:00 (CET)
  - Summer (DST): UTC+02:00 (CEST)
- INSEE/Postal code: 51536 /51500
- ^{1} French Land Register data, which excludes lakes, ponds, glaciers > 1 km^{2} (0.386 sq mi or 247 acres) and river estuaries.

Sillery (French pronunciation: [sil(ə)ʁi]) is a commune in the north-eastern French department of Marne.

== Champagne ==
The village's vineyards are located in the Montagne de Reims subregion of Champagne, and are classified as Grand Cru (100%) in the Champagne vineyard classification. The vineyards produce mostly Chardonnay grapes; the grapes are used to produce both Champagne and still Coteaux Champenois wine.

== See also ==
- Communes of the Marne department
- Classification of Champagne vineyards
- Fort de la Pompelle, a nearby World War I fortification
