= Aÿ-Champagne =

- Commune
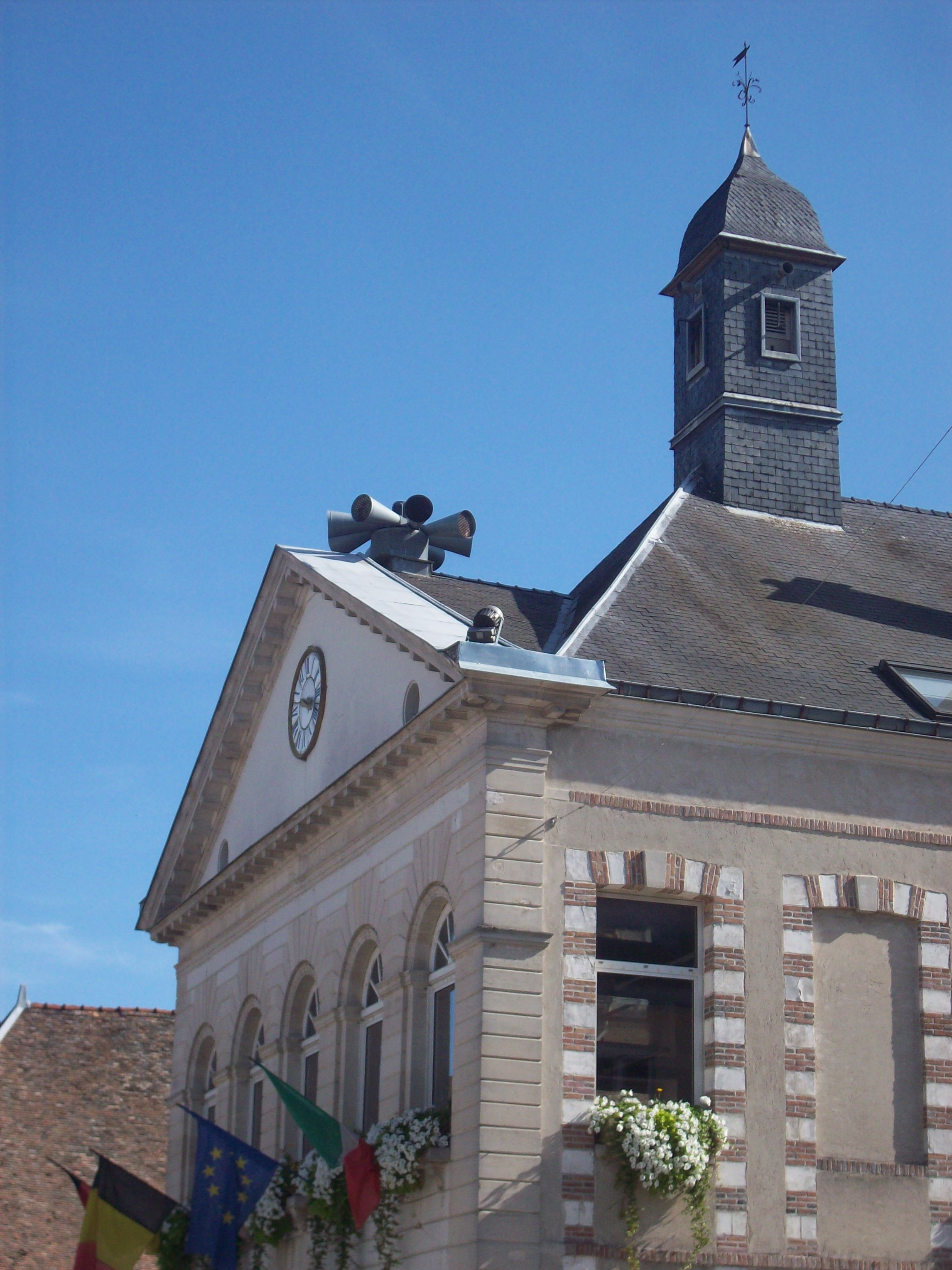
- The town hall in Aÿ
- Location of Aÿ-Champagne
- Location within France Location within Grand Est
- Coordinates: 49°03′22″N 4°00′14″E
- Country: France
- Region: Grand Est
- Department: Marne
- Arrondissement: Épernay
- Canton: Épernay-1
- Intercommunality: CC Grande Vallée de la Marne

Government
  - Mayor (2020–2026): Dominique Lévêque
- Area^{1}: 31.94 km^{2} (12.33 sq mi)
- Population (2023): 5,103
  - Density: 159.8/km^{2} (413.8/sq mi)
- Time zone: UTC+01:00 (CET)
  - Summer (DST): UTC+02:00 (CEST)
- INSEE/Postal code: 51030 /51160
- ^{1} French Land Register data, which excludes lakes, ponds, glaciers > 1 km^{2} (0.386 sq mi or 247 acres) and river estuaries.

Aÿ-Champagne (French pronunciation: [aˑji ʃɑ̃paɲ]) is a commune in the Marne department, northern France. The municipality was established on 1 January 2016 and consists of the former communes of Aÿ, Mareuil-sur-Ay, and Bisseuil. They keep their names and town halls.

== Population ==
The population data given in the table below refer to the commune in its geography as of January 2025.

Historical population
Year	Pop.	±% p.a.
1968	6,456	—
1975	6,433	−0.05%
1982	6,452	+0.04%
1990	6,258	−0.38%
1999	6,165	−0.17%
2007	5,972	−0.40%
2012	5,889	−0.28%
2017	5,592	−1.03%
2023	5,103	−1.51%
Source: INSEE

== Champagne ==
=== Aÿ ===
Aÿ is most famous as a centre of the production of champagne. Aÿ's vineyards are located in the Vallée de la Marne subregion of Champagne, and are classified as grand cru (100%) in the Champagne vineyard classification. Many prestigious champagne houses own vineyards in the immediate vicinity, and several producers are located in Aÿ, including Ayala and Bollinger.

=== Mareuil-sur-Aÿ ===
Its vineyards are located in the Vallée de la Marne subregion of Champagne, and are classified as premier cru (99%) in the Champagne vineyard classification. Together with Tauxières-Mutry it is the highest rated of the premiers crus villages, and has therefore just missed out on grand cru (100%) status.

== See also ==
- Communes of the Marne department

== International relations ==
Aÿ-Champagne is twinned with:

- (United Kingdom) Newton Abbot, England.
