= Champagne Palmer & Co =

Champagne company based in Reims

Champagne Palmer & Co is a Champagne Producer based in Reims. They source grapes from 350 growers and over 4000 hectares (around 10000 acres) of vines in the Champagne region.

== History ==
It started in 1947 as an association of seven well established winegrowers, all owners of Premier and Grand Cru vineyards in the areas of the Montagne de Reims. Starting in 1959, the founders established themselves in Reims where they purchased cellars of a Champagne House.

In 1997 the company bought another large cellar which gives them two large sites near one another.

Palmer & Co holds over 200 hectares (490 acres) classified as Grand and Premier Crus in the Montagne de Reims area. Grapes from the Côte de Sézanne, Côte des Bars and Vallée de la Marne complete their blends, all contributing their specific characteristics.

Beginning October 2015, Palmer and Co champagne was sold in the United States according to Forbes magazine. As of May 2018, they formed an exclusive partnership with Constellation Brands, who will serve as their exclusive importer for the United States.

== Time is an accomplice ==
The Palmer & Co quality strives for the integrity of the grapes and the wines at all stages of the winemaking process. They age their wine longer than the law requires and for a longer time than most competitors. Palmer ages non-vintage bottles for 4 years (legal requirement is 15 months), vintage bottles for 5–8 years (legal requirement is 3 years) and a magnum is aged for 10 years.

== The exception of the "big bottles" ==
Palmer & Co is one of the very rare Champagne Houses that still produces wine in the monumental 15-litre Nebuchadnezzar.

== The « collections » ==
- Brut Réserve
- Extra Réserve
- Rosé Réserve
- Nectar Réserve
- Blanc de Blancs
- Blanc de Noirs
- Vintage
- Amazone de Palmer
