= Belemnites =

Belemnites may refer to:

- Belemnitida, an extinct order of cephalopods commonly known as "belemnites"
- Belemnites (genus), a belemnite genus from the Early Jurassic
