= Germain Mennerat =

French general (1889–1973)

Germain-Stanislas-Victor Mennerat
- Born: July 30, 1889; Les Riceys, France
- Died: August 2, 1973 (aged 84); Lyon, France
- Military career
- Allegiance: France; Vichy France
- Branch: (France) French Army (Vichy France) Armistice Army
- Rank: Major-general
- Conflicts: World War II: Battle of Lạng Sơn (1940)

Germain Mennerat was a French general who served in the Second World War. Mennerat was born in July 1889 and died in August 1973. Germain Mennerat also collected artifacts from his travels in Africa, some featured in national museums.

== Battle of Lạng Sơn (1940) ==
Germain Mennerat was a Brigadier-General in French Indochina during World War II. On 22 September 1940, the Empire of Japan invaded French Indochina. The army of which Mennerat commanded, the 2nd Brigade of the Tonkin Division, was attacked by Japanese forces in Lạng Sơn and were quickly encircled.
