= Château de Ricey-Bas =

Chateau and former castle in France

Coordinates: 8°00′18″N 4°22′13″E

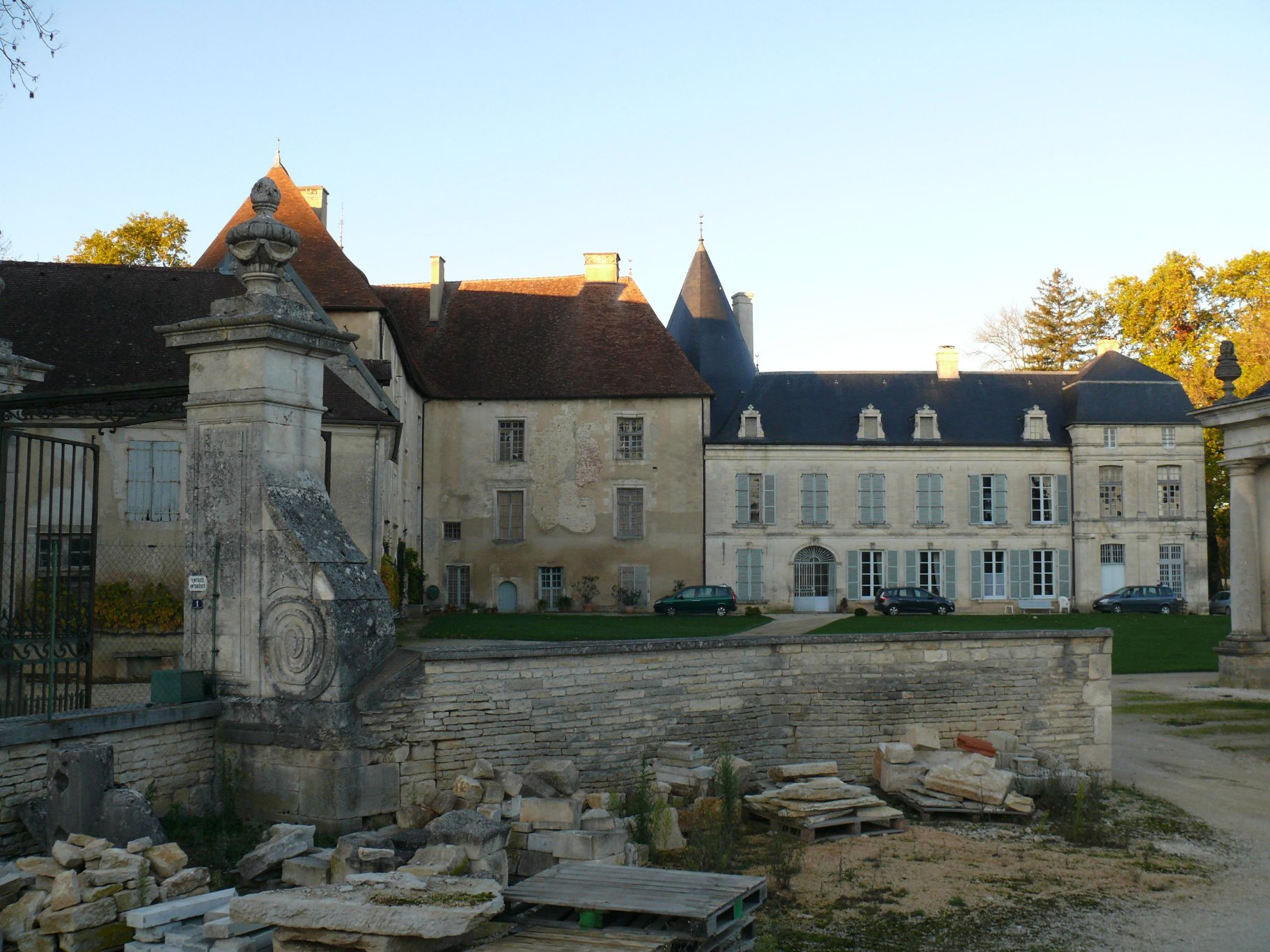

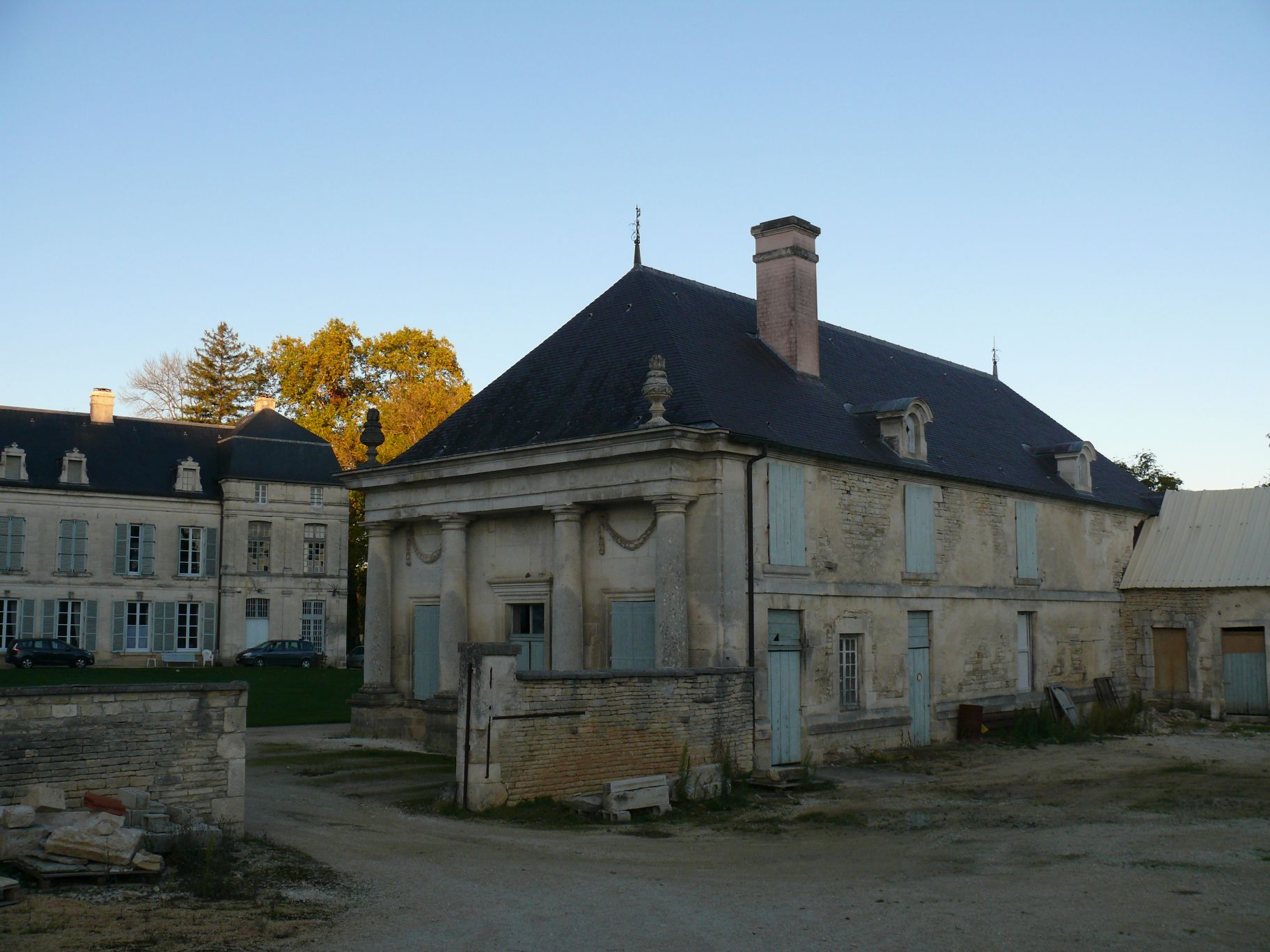
View of the château.

The Château de Ricey-Bas is a former castle, converted to a château, in the commune of Les Riceys, in the Aube département of France.

== Description ==
The castle is attached to a park and surrounded by the Laigne river.

== History ==
Robert de Ricey had a fortified house constructed in 1086. This keep was destroyed by the king. In 1424, Nicolas Rolin had a new castle built on the site which had been given to him by the Duke of Burgundy. This became a residence for the Bishops of Chalons-sur-Saône.

Marie d'Amboise, who was the tenant of the fiefdom, modified the castle in 1450, notably with two towers. One of the towers is named after Anne de Laval; she had a new tower, 12 metres in diameter, built, as well as a gallery, in 1506.

The manor became a marquessate in 1659 for Louis Vignier.

The château is privately owned and not open to the public. It was added to the list of monuments historiques in 1967, and classified in 1979 and 1985. The park and gardens, designed by André Le Nôtre, are open to the public between April and August.

== See also ==
- List of castles in France
