= Trésain =

6th century Irish missionary to France, and saint

Saint Trésain
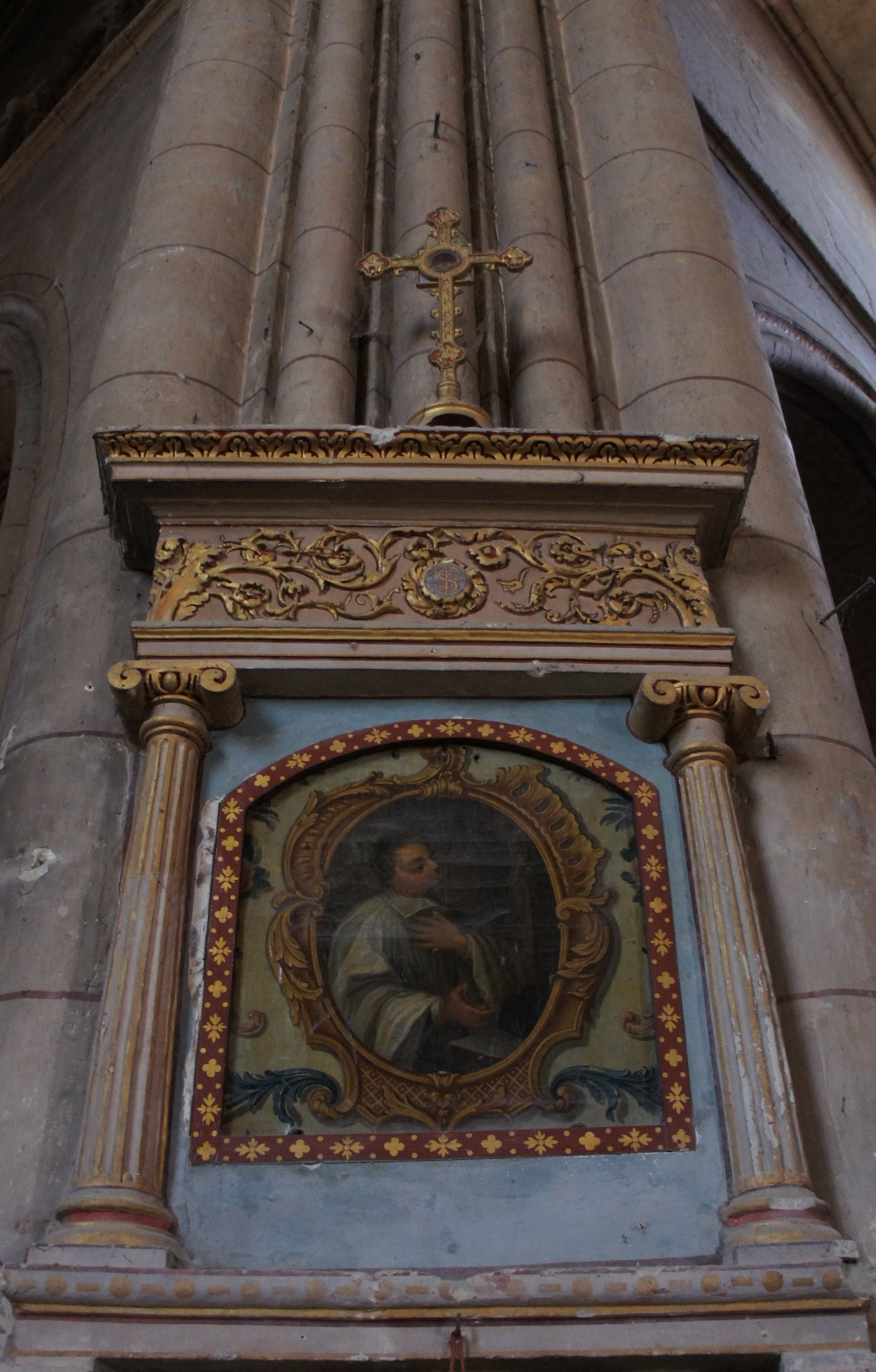
- Tresain praying before of the Crucifix, from the Église Saint-Trésain in Avenay-Val-d'Or

Curate of Mareuil on the Marne
- Born: 6th century Ireland
- Died: 6th century Mareuil on the Marne
- Venerated in: Reims area
- Feast: 7 February

Saint Trésain (French pronunciation: [tʁe.zɛ̃]; or Tressan, Tresanus; 6th century) was an Irish missionary in France. His feast day is 7 February.

Saint Trésain is patron of Mareuil sur Marne (Mareuil-sur-Ay) and of the parish church of Avenay-Val-d'Or.

== Monks of Ramsgate account ==
The monks of St Augustine's Abbey, Ramsgate wrote in their Book of Saints (1921),

Tresain (St.) (Feb. 7)
(6th cent.) An Irish priest who laboured with great zeal in Champagne (France).

== Butler's account ==
The hagiographer Alban Butler (1710–1773) wrote in his Lives of the Fathers, Martyrs, and Other Principal Saints under February 7,

St. Tresain, or Tresanus, Priest and Confessor He was a holy Irish priest, who having left his own country, preached with great zeal in France, and died curate of Mareuil upon the Marne, in the sixth century. His relics are held in great veneration at Avenay in Champagne. See his life in Colgan and Bollandus.

== Majoret's Vie ==
Laurent Majoret published his Vie de S. Tresain in Toul in 1650, reissued in Rheims in 1700 and in 1743. He wrote that Trésain was born in Ireland of honest and prosperous parents and decided to dedicate himself to God. He had six brothers, the saints Gibrain, Tésan, Germain, Véran, Atran and Pétran, and three sisters, the saints Trantle, Pomprie and Possenne, all of whom accompanied him to France. There he placed himself under Saint Remy, Archbishop of Reims, who directed them to stay at a place beside the River Marne. Wanting to become a priest, Trésain undertook the study of Latin and Christian works. After completing his study he was ordained by Remy at Reims, despite opposition from the gentry of Ay. He was assigned to the village of Mareuil sur Marne. He performed various miracles during his ministry. He died on 7 February and his body was taken to the abbey of Avenay.

== Sources ==
- Butler, Alban (1823), The Lives of the Irish Saints, Extracted from the Writings of the Rev. Alban Butler, and Now Placed in Order, with a Prefixed Callender; to which is Added, an Office and Litany in Their Honour, with a Defence of the Monastic Institute. By a Cistercian Monk, J. Coyne This article incorporates text from this source, which is in the public domain.
- Majoret, Laurent (1743), La vie de S. Tresain, Confesseur, Patron de Mareuil sur Marne & Patron de l'Église Paroissiale d'Avenay, Rheims: François Jeunehomme
- St. Augustine's Abbey, Ramsgate (1921), The Book of saints : a dictionary of servants of God canonized by the Catholic Church, London: A. & C. Black, ltd. This article incorporates text from this source, which is in the public domain.
