= Billecart-Salmon =

Champagne house in France

Coordinates: 49.0459393°N 4.0342175°E

- Location: Mareuil-sur-Aÿ, Marne, France
- Appellation: Champagne
- Founded: 1818
- Key people: Mathieu Roland-Billecart
- Website: champagne-billecart.fr

Champagne Billecart-Salmon is a medium-sized champagne house in Mareuil-sur-Aÿ, France. Founded in 1818 with the marriage of Nicolas François Billecart and Elisabeth Salmon, it is one of the few to remain family owned.

The Cuvée Nicolas-Francois Billecart 1959 won first place in the Champagne of the Millennium 1999, out of 150 of the finest 20th century Champagnes. A magnum of the winning champagne later sold for £3,300.

Billecart-Salmon was ranked tenth among major Champagne houses by Antoine Gerbelle writing for La Revue du vin de France. La Revue du vin de France's Guide Vert awards Billecart-Salmon two stars out of three. Billecart-Salmon Brut Reserve are aged in the cellars for 36 months before release.

Billecart-Salmon champagnes have been reviewed favourably by wine writer Jancis Robinson.

Since 2019, the president of the house has been Mathieu Roland-Billecart, who represents the family’s seventh generation.

== See also ==
- List of Champagne houses
