= Gaston Hanet Archambault =

French journalsist (1877–1951)

- Born: 25 February 1877; Aÿ, Marne, France
- Died: 21 May 1951 (aged 74); Cape Town, South Africa
- Occupation: Journalist

Gaston Hanet Archambault (25 February 1877 – 21 May 1951), known as G. H. Archambault, was a journalist considered by many to be the Dean of Franco-American Newspaper Men.

== Life ==
Gaston Hanet Archambault was born in Aÿ, Marne, France, on 25 February 1877. He was educated in England at Bedford Modern School.

Archambault started his career in journalism as a correspondent for British financial newspapers in Paris. He later moved to Galignani's Messenger, one of the first English language newspapers in Paris. In 1905, Archambault joined the Paris Herald which had been founded by James Gordon Bennett Jr. Apart from his service in the French Army during World War I, he was in charge of the Paris Herald for fifteen years.

During World War I, Archambault served in the French Army where he was wounded at the Battle of Verdun and was awarded the Legion of Honour and the Croix de Guerre. When he recovered, Archambault became Liaison Officer to the American Expeditionary Forces.

In 1924 Archambault worked at the Paris Times for Cortlandt F. Bishop but later moved to the New York Sun before joining the Paris Bureau of The New York Times in 1933. After the outbreak of World War II, when Nazi tanks were within 35 kilometres of Paris, The New York Times reported on 10 June 1940 that the French Government had fled the capital and the Paris-based journalists at The New York Times understandably followed having witnessed, from their office on 37 Rue de Caumartin, over one thousand German bombs land on Paris in the early days of June 1940.

On 12 June 1940, Archambault wrote about his escape from Paris, at the age of 63. The exodus from Paris following the German invasion was enormous: over four million people fled on the highways in and around the capital. Archambault and a colleague, Percy J. Philip, spent a night in Orléans, sleeping under the véranda of a closed restaurant, and later arrived in Tours to provide news to The New York Times. Soon after Archambault's arrival in Tours the Germans did take control of Paris and breached the Maginot Line.

On 23 June 1940, The New York Times announced that France had signed a truce with Nazi Germany. As the war quickly progressed, Archambault moved to Bordeaux and then Vichy where the Times bureau established itself trying to find a semblance of calm in the increasing chaos of war. The bureau was reduced to three reporters: Archambault, Lansing Warren and Daniel Brigham.

Archambault was asked by Varian Fry to assist in publicising the arrest in 1940 of Fritz Thyssen. Fry's relationship with Archambault also helped the release of Chagall. Archambault wrote about Laval's ‘sell-out’ to the Germans and was then assigned to Bern in Switzerland but was back in Paris in October 1944 when the city had been liberated by the Allied Forces. He was present at the French Court that approved the death sentence of Laval.

While in Bern Archambault wrote a manuscript in 1942 relating his views and experience as a young boy at school in England and then in the French Army and later in World War I trenches. Chapters of the book cover working for Ralph Lane (Nobel prize winner) and especially his life and times with The Herald newspaper and its eccentric millionaire owner. There are also analyses of French military strategy that eventually led to total defeat in 1940 with a vivid description of the population exodus. Throughout the book Archambault follows his quest for democracy. The manuscript survived and was published in the original English version in 2023 and a French translation in 2024. All of Hanet Archambault's newspaper articles for the New York Times are in the New York Times archives. There were many front-page articles especially during the years 1939 and 1940 which show the inexorable progress of the German invasion.

In 1945 Archambault was sent to London but was then asked to establish an office of The New York Times in South Africa where he resided in Pretoria.

Archambault died in Cape Town on 21 May 1951. His funeral was held at St. George's Cathedral, Cape Town, South Africa, where the pallbearers were Armand Gazel, the French Ambassador; Bernard C. Connelly, United States Charges a’Affaires; Jack E. Bruce, Minister of External Affairs; Christiaan A. Smith of the State Information Office; Robert Stimson, representing the foreign correspondents; George Aschman of The Cape Times; Johannes H. Lessing, chairman of the Press Gallery Association and Arthur J. Classen of the South African Press Association.

The chief mourner at Archambault's funeral was Michael Hanet Archambault, his only surviving son. The Cape Argus reported that Mr. Archambault's death ‘will be grievously regretted by all who met and admired this distinguished journalist’.

== Publications ==
- Take Heed, America, by G. H. Archambauld. Published New York City, 1941
- Europe in Turmoil and Democracy in Peril 1900-1940: My life as a newspaper man, from the Herald to the New York Times, by Gaston Hanet Archambault, 1942. Archambault's memoirs were published independently and posthumously in 2023
