= Bouzy =

- Commune
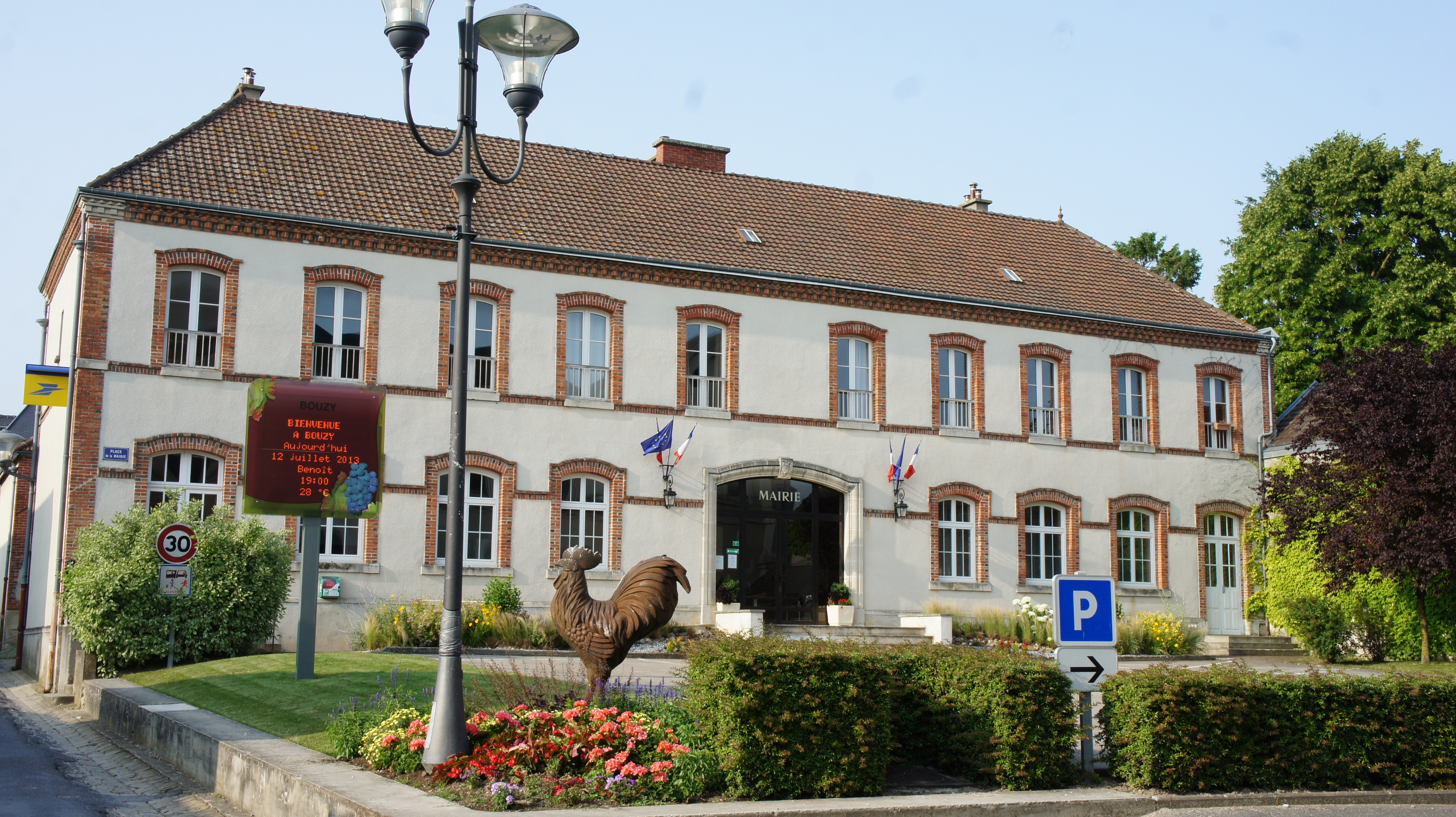
- The town hall in Bouzy
- Location of Bouzy
- Location within France Location within Grand Est
- Coordinates: 49°04′49″N 4°08′52″E
- Country: France
- Region: Grand Est
- Department: Marne
- Arrondissement: Épernay
- Canton: Épernay-1

Government
  - Mayor (2020–2026): Jean-François Sainz
- Area^{1}: 6.26 km^{2} (2.42 sq mi)
- Elevation: 116 m (381 ft)
- Population (2023): 825
  - Density: 132/km^{2} (341/sq mi)
- Time zone: UTC+01:00 (CET)
  - Summer (DST): UTC+02:00 (CEST)
- INSEE/Postal code: 51079 /51150
- ^{1} French Land Register data, which excludes lakes, ponds, glaciers > 1 km^{2} (0.386 sq mi or 247 acres) and river estuaries.

Bouzy (French pronunciation: [buzi]) is a commune of the Marne department in northeastern France, the Montagne de Reims subregion of Champagne.

== Population ==
Historical population
Year	Pop.	±% p.a.
1968	927	—
1975	1,005	+1.16%
1982	1,009	+0.06%
1990	967	−0.53%
1999	997	+0.34%
2007	956	−0.52%
2012	937	−0.40%
2017	921	−0.34%
2023	825	−1.82%
Source: INSEE

== Champagne ==
The village's vineyards are located in the Montagne de Reims subregion of Champagne, and are classified as Grand Cru (100%) in the Champagne vineyard classification.

The village of Bouzy is located in the southeast of Montagne de Reims. The slopes of the mountain occupy most of the town and up to the vineyards of Champagne and to the Black Coast.

== See also ==
- Milo of Nanteuil
- Philippe de Nanteuil
- Communes of the Marne department
- Classification of Champagne vineyards
- Montagne de Reims Regional Natural Park
