= Rosé des Riceys AOC =

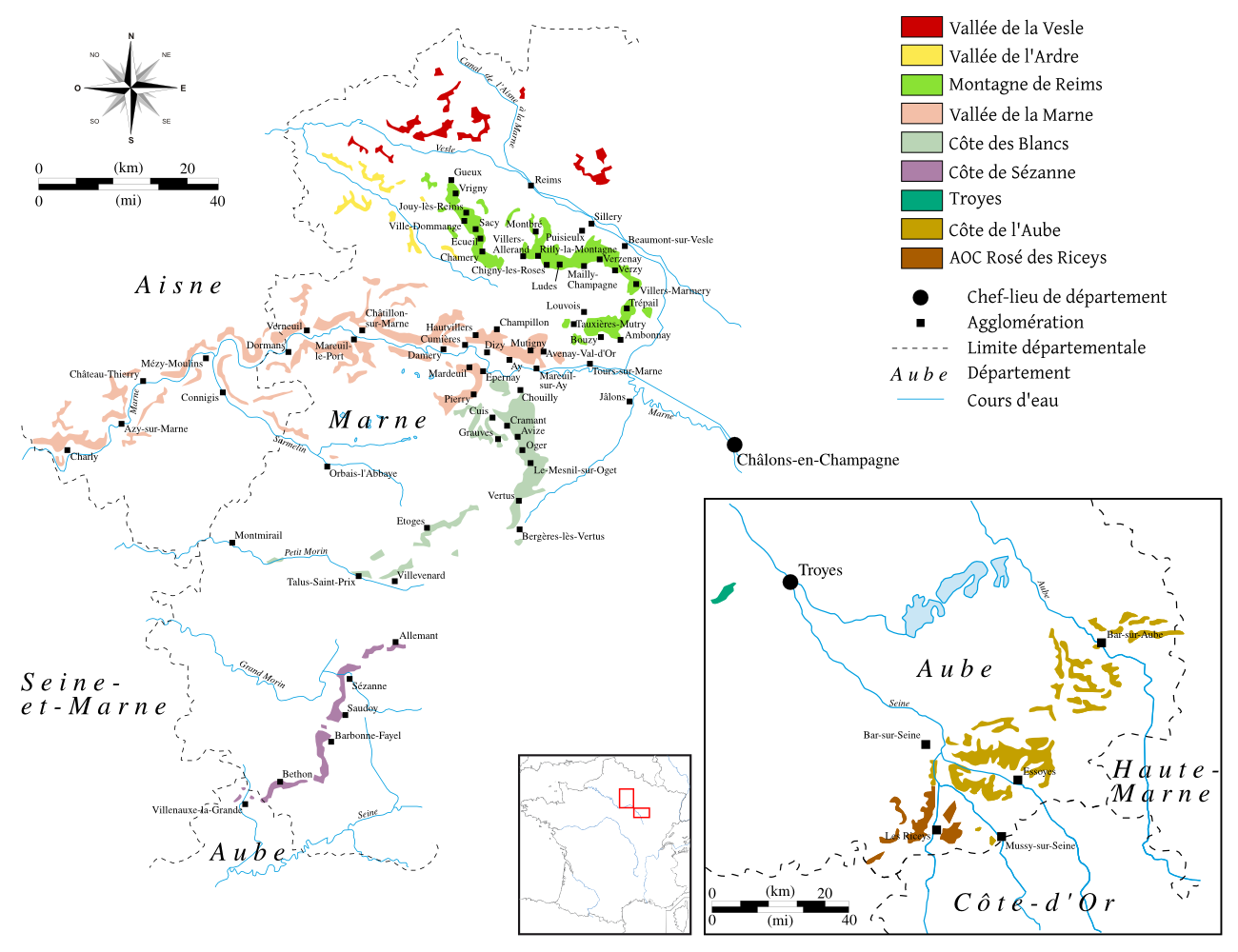
Rosé des Riceys AOC is located in the Aube region within the Champagne wine region

Rosé des Riceys is a French wine Appellation d'Origine Contrôlée (AOC) in the three villages of Les Riceys, a commune in the Aube département in the Champagne province of France. The wines are all rosé, produced from the pinot noir grape. They are either fermented in stainless steel tanks for early drinking or in wood allowing longer ageing. They have a distinctive taste known to the French as goût des Riceys. Les Riceys is the only wine-growing area to have three AOCs: AOC Champagne, AOC Côteaux Champenois red wine and AOC Rosé de Riceys.

== See also ==
- Champagne Riots of 1911
