= Champagne hillsides, houses and cellars =

World Heritage site in France

Champagne Hillsides, Houses and Cellars
UNESCO World Heritage Site
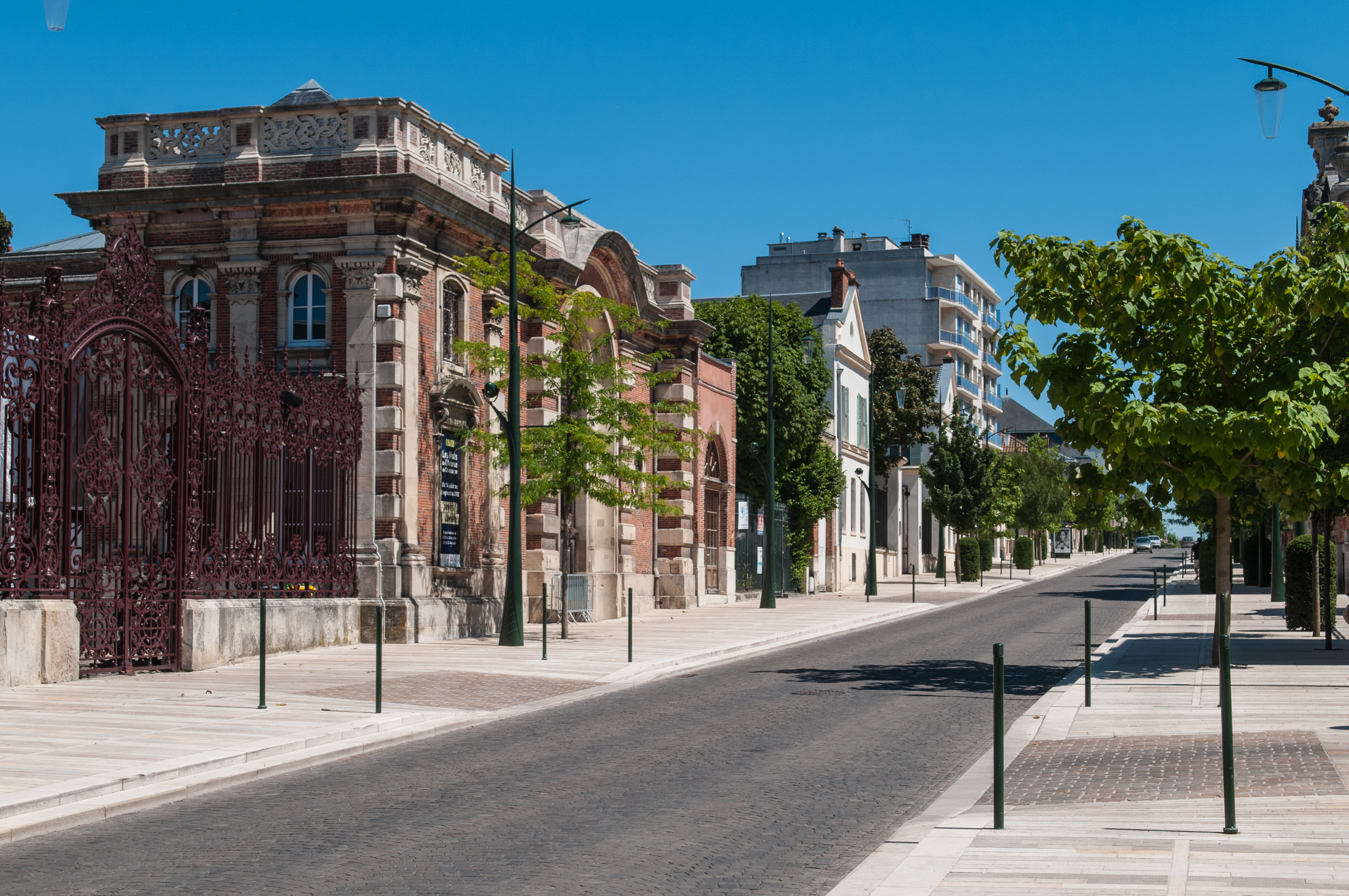
- Avenue de Champagne in Épernay

- Location within France
- Location: France
- Criteria: Cultural: (iii), (iv), (vi)
- Reference: 1465
- Inscription: 2015 (39th Session)
- Area: 1,101.72 ha (2,722.4 acres)
- Buffer zone: 4,251.16 ha (10,504.8 acres)
- Coordinates: 49°4′39″N 3°56′46″E

Champagne hillsides, houses and cellars is the name given to several sites in the Champagne region of France inscribed to the UNESCO World Heritage List in 2015 for their historical ties to the production and sale of champagne, as well as their testimony to the development of an internationally renowned agro-industrial enterprise.

== Description ==
Although it only occupies a small part of the Champagne wine region, the World Heritage site consists of locations that represent the entire process of creating and selling champagne. In total, there are 14 distinct sites, grouped into three categories:

- The historic vineyards of Hautvillers, Aÿ, and Mareuil-sur-Aÿ, and their corresponding cellars, where the grapes have been cultivated and fermented since at least 1673.
- Saint-Nicaise Hill in Reims, an urban vineyard with its own cellars that is combined with public spaces and parks.
- Avenue de Champagne and Fort Chabrol in Épernay, the most well-known location for showcasing and selling the champagne.

The vineyards at Hautvillers, Aÿ, and Mareuil-sur-Aÿ include the on-site harvest huts and presses, used to process the grapes with minimal transportation. The cellars beneath the villages and vineyards, dug into the chalky hillsides in the 17th and 18th centuries, run uphill from the vineyards. However, the most extensive cellars are found at Saint-Nicaise Hill. These cellars, built later than the ones outside of the city, expanded on already-existing underground chalk quarries and extend multiple kilometers underneath the vineyards and the town. The Avenue of Champagne in Epernay contains the headquarters of many of the preeminent champagne manufacturers. Built along a major trading route between France and Germany, the street has housed champagne merchant buildings since the 18th century.
