= Bisseuil =

- Part of Aÿ-Champagne
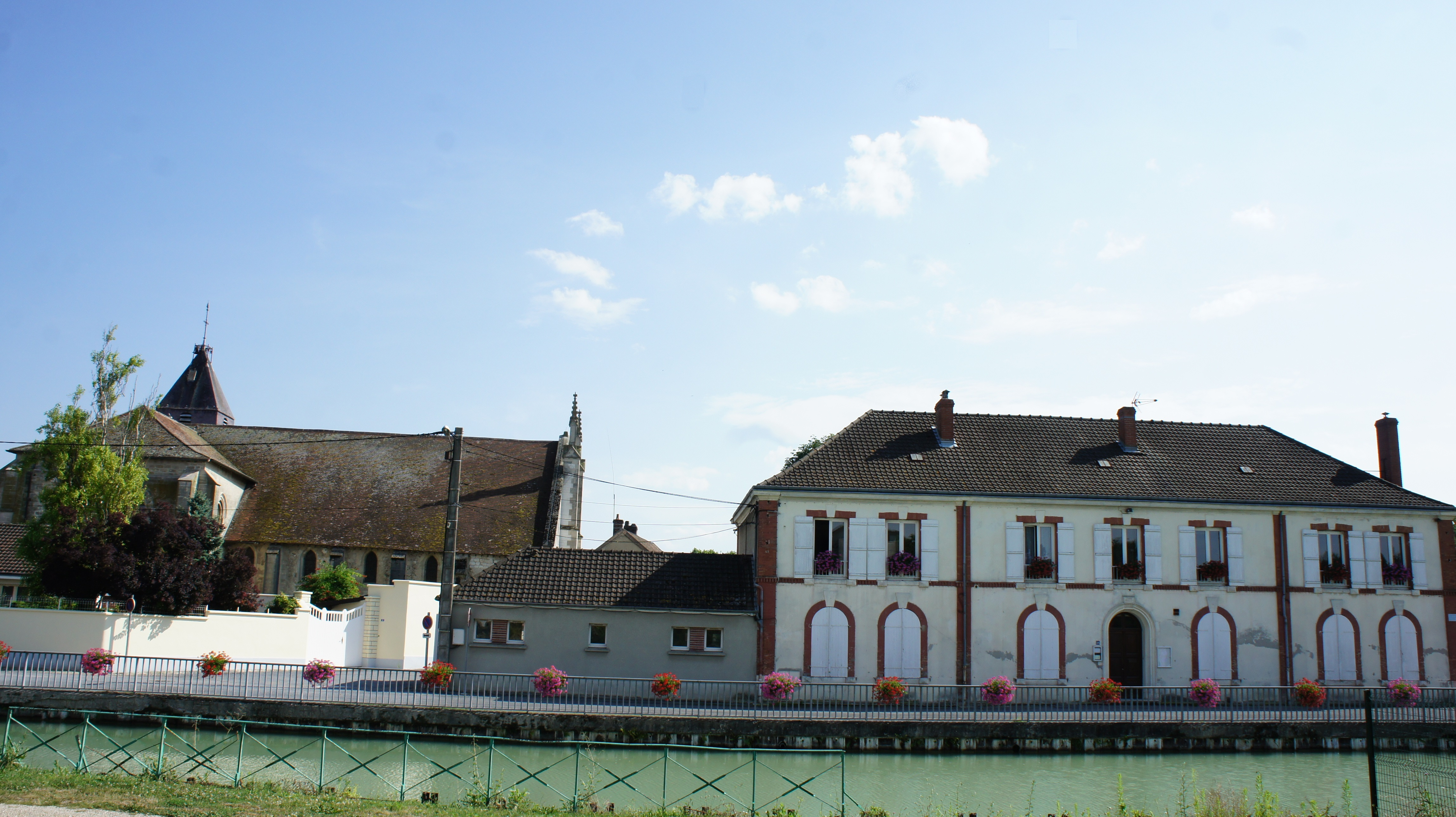
- Town hall
- Location of Bisseuil
- Location within France Location within Grand Est
- Coordinates: 49°02′46″N 4°05′21″E
- Country: France
- Region: Grand Est
- Department: Marne
- Arrondissement: Épernay
- Canton: Ay
- Commune: Aÿ-Champagne
- Area^{1}: 10.03 km^{2} (3.87 sq mi)
- Elevation: 75 m (246 ft)
- Population (2023): 616
  - Density: 61.4/km^{2} (159/sq mi)
- Time zone: UTC+01:00 (CET)
  - Summer (DST): UTC+02:00 (CEST)
- Postal code: 51150
- ^{1} French Land Register data, which excludes lakes, ponds, glaciers > 1 km^{2} (0.386 sq mi or 247 acres) and river estuaries.

Bisseuil (French pronunciation: [bisœj]) is a former commune of the Marne department in northeastern France. Since January 2016, Bisseuil is part of the administrative commune Aÿ-Champagne.

== See also ==
- Communes of the Marne department
- Montagne de Reims Regional Natural Park
