= Coteaux Champenois AOC =

French wine geographic appellation

A bottle of red Coteaux Champenois wine.

Coteaux Champenois (French pronunciation: [kɔto ʃɑ̃pənwa]) is a wine Appellation d'Origine Contrôlée (AOC) in the Champagne province of France. It covers the same area as sparkling Champagne production, but covers only still wines. The grapes are the same as those allowed for sparkling Champagne: Pinot noir and Pinot Meunier for red wines, and Chardonnay for whites. Rosé wines are made very rarely, but there is also a rosé AOC in the Champagne region, Rosé des Riceys. Production is small, especially in vintages where yields are low, given the high demand for Champagne and the higher profit of producing sparkling wine.
