= Les Riceys =

Commune in Grand Est, France

- Commune
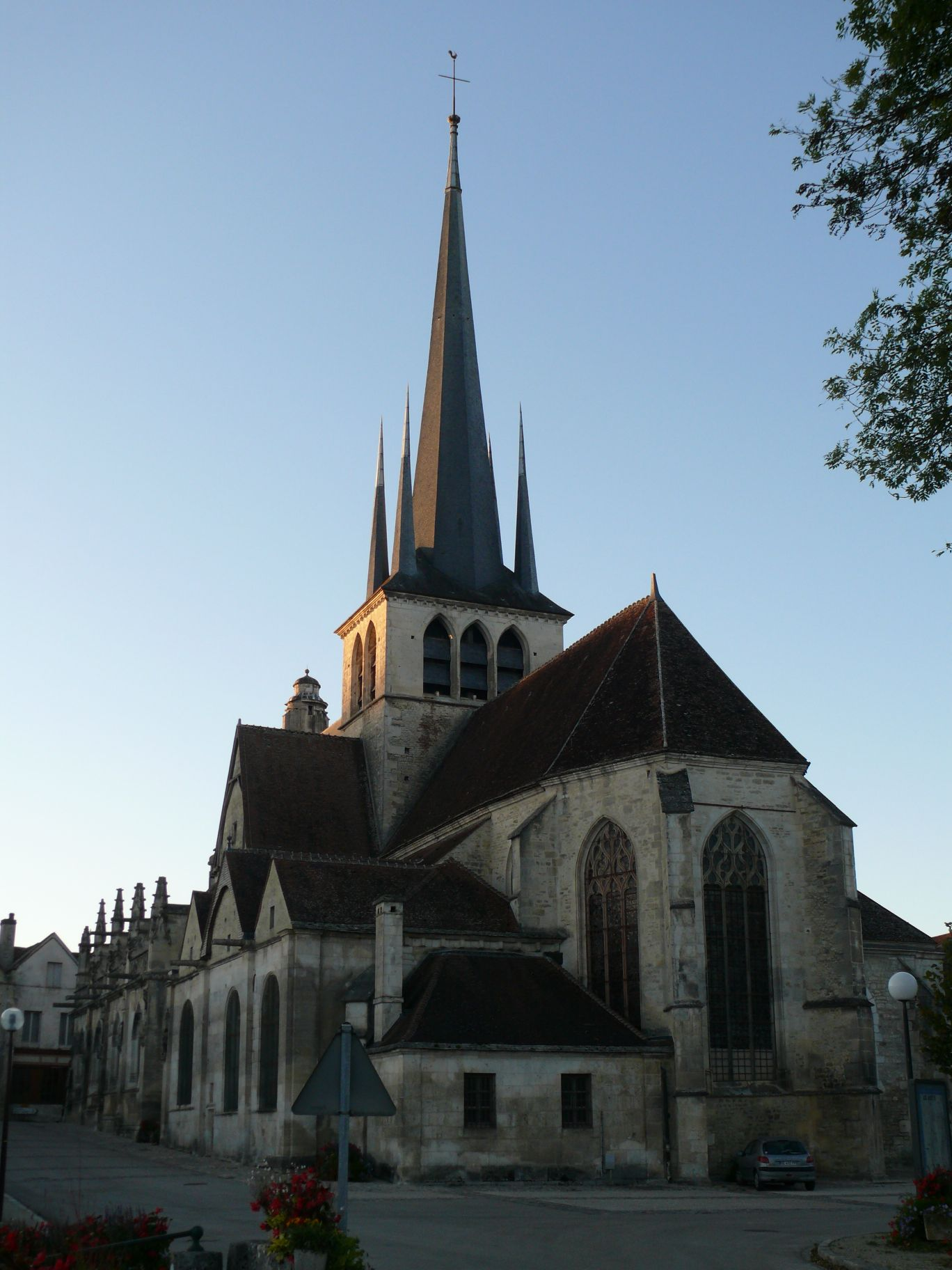
- Church of Saint Peter in Chains in Les Riceys

- Coat of arms
- Location of Les Riceys
- Location within France Location within Grand Est
- Coordinates: 47°59′32″N 4°22′04″E
- Country: France
- Region: Grand Est
- Department: Aube
- Arrondissement: Troyes
- Canton: Les Riceys

Government
  - Mayor (2020–2026): Laurent Noirot
- Area^{1}: 42.93 km^{2} (16.58 sq mi)
- Elevation: 180 m (590 ft)
- Population (2023): 1,174
  - Density: 27.35/km^{2} (70.83/sq mi)
- Time zone: UTC+01:00 (CET)
  - Summer (DST): UTC+02:00 (CEST)
- INSEE/Postal code: 10317 /10340
- ^{1} French Land Register data, which excludes lakes, ponds, glaciers > 1 km^{2} (0.386 sq mi or 247 acres) and river estuaries.

Les Riceys (French pronunciation: [le ʁisɛ]) is a commune in the Aube department in north-central France. It is situated in an important viticultural area, and in particular is known for Rosé des Riceys wine.

With its 866 ha of vines, it is the commune that has the largest wine-growing area in all of Champagne.

== Population ==
Historical population
Year	Pop.	±% p.a.
1968	1,567	—
1975	1,525	−0.39%
1982	1,505	−0.19%
1990	1,421	−0.72%
1999	1,376	−0.36%
2007	1,363	−0.12%
2012	1,319	−0.65%
2017	1,243	−1.18%
2023	1,174	−0.95%
Source: INSEE

== See also ==
- Communes of the Aube department
