= Côte de Sézanne =

Viticultural zones in the Champagne region

Côte de Sézanne is one of the five sub-regions of the Champagne wine region. It is south of Vallée de la Marne, Champagne, and Côte des Blancs.
