= Saint-Loup, Marne =

Saint-Loup
- Commune
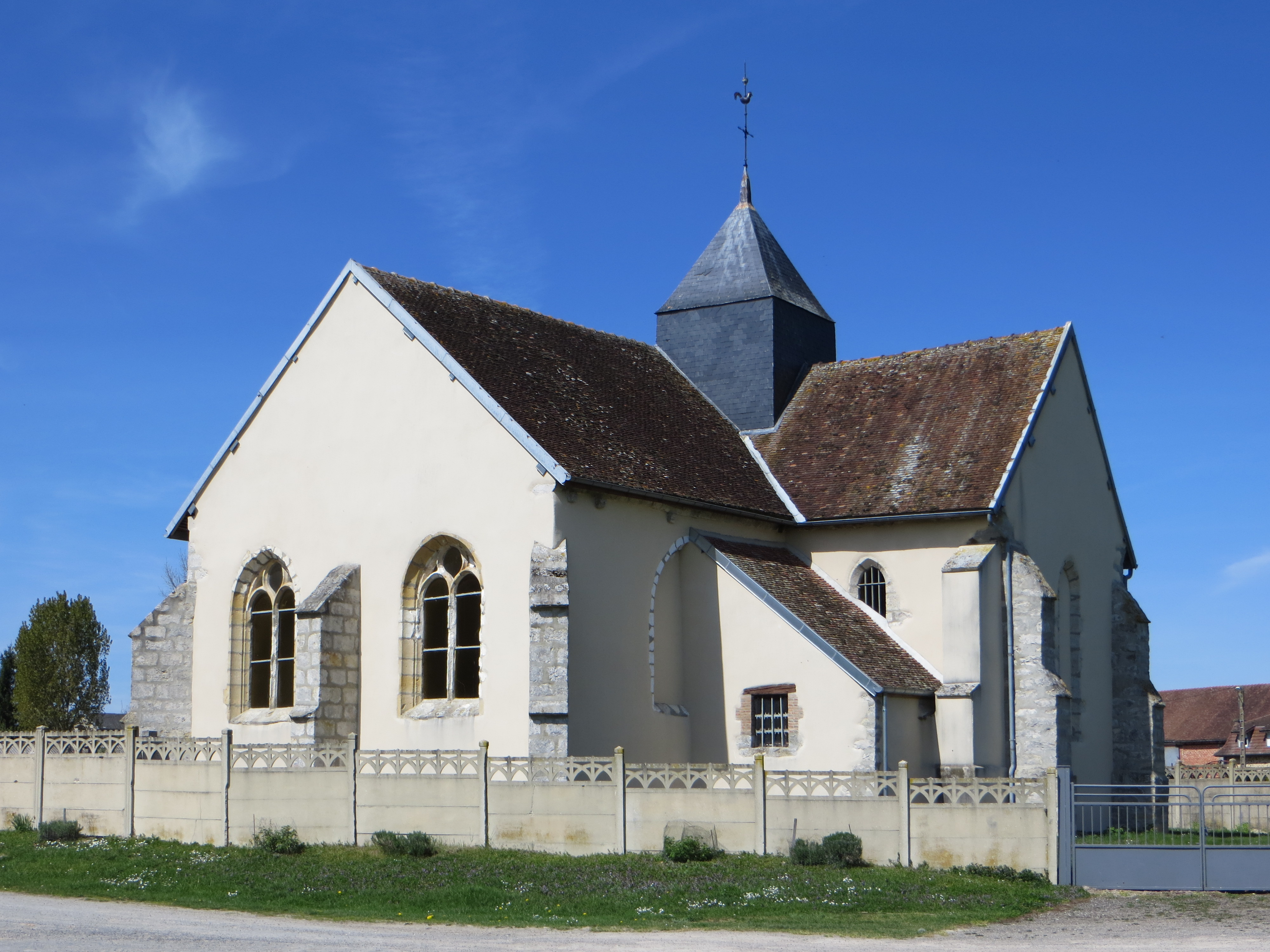
- The church in Saint-Loup
- Location of Saint-Loup
- Location within France Location within Grand Est
- Coordinates: 48°44′18″N 3°48′41″E
- Country: France
- Region: Grand Est
- Department: Marne
- Arrondissement: Épernay
- Canton: Sézanne-Brie et Champagne

Government
  - Mayor (2020–2026): Jean-Claude Médrano
- Area^{1}: 6.88 km^{2} (2.66 sq mi)
- Elevation: 115 m (377 ft)
- Population (2023): 74
  - Density: 11/km^{2} (28/sq mi)
- Time zone: UTC+01:00 (CET)
  - Summer (DST): UTC+02:00 (CEST)
- INSEE/Postal code: 51495 /51120
- ^{1} French Land Register data, which excludes lakes, ponds, glaciers > 1 km^{2} (0.386 sq mi or 247 acres) and river estuaries.

Saint-Loup (French pronunciation: [sɛ̃ lu]) is a commune in the Marne department in north-eastern France.

== See also ==
- Communes of the Marne department
