= Montagne de Reims =

Coordinates: 49.14210°N 4.14838°E

Viticultural zones in the Champagne region

Montagne de Reims is one of the five sub-regions of the Champagne wine region. It is north of Vallée de la Marne, Côte de Sézanne and Côte des Blancs.

The region is located around Reims Mountain, from Reims to Épernay, and contains nine Grands Crus villages. Its soils are chalk-based, with striations of loam, lignite, clay, sand, silt, and marl. Pinot Noir is the main grape cultivated.
