= Vallée de la Marne =

Viticultural zones in the Champagne region

Vallée de la Marne is a sub-region of the Champagne wine region located on the riverbanks of the Marne. It is south of Champagne and Montagne de Reims, and north of Côte de Sézanne and Côte des Blancs.

Its soils are more variable than in other Champagne sub-regions, and it contains only two Grands Crus villages: Aÿ and Tours-sur-Marne.

Pinot meunier is the main grape variety at about 59% of production, while about 23% is pinot noir and about 18% is Chardonnay.
