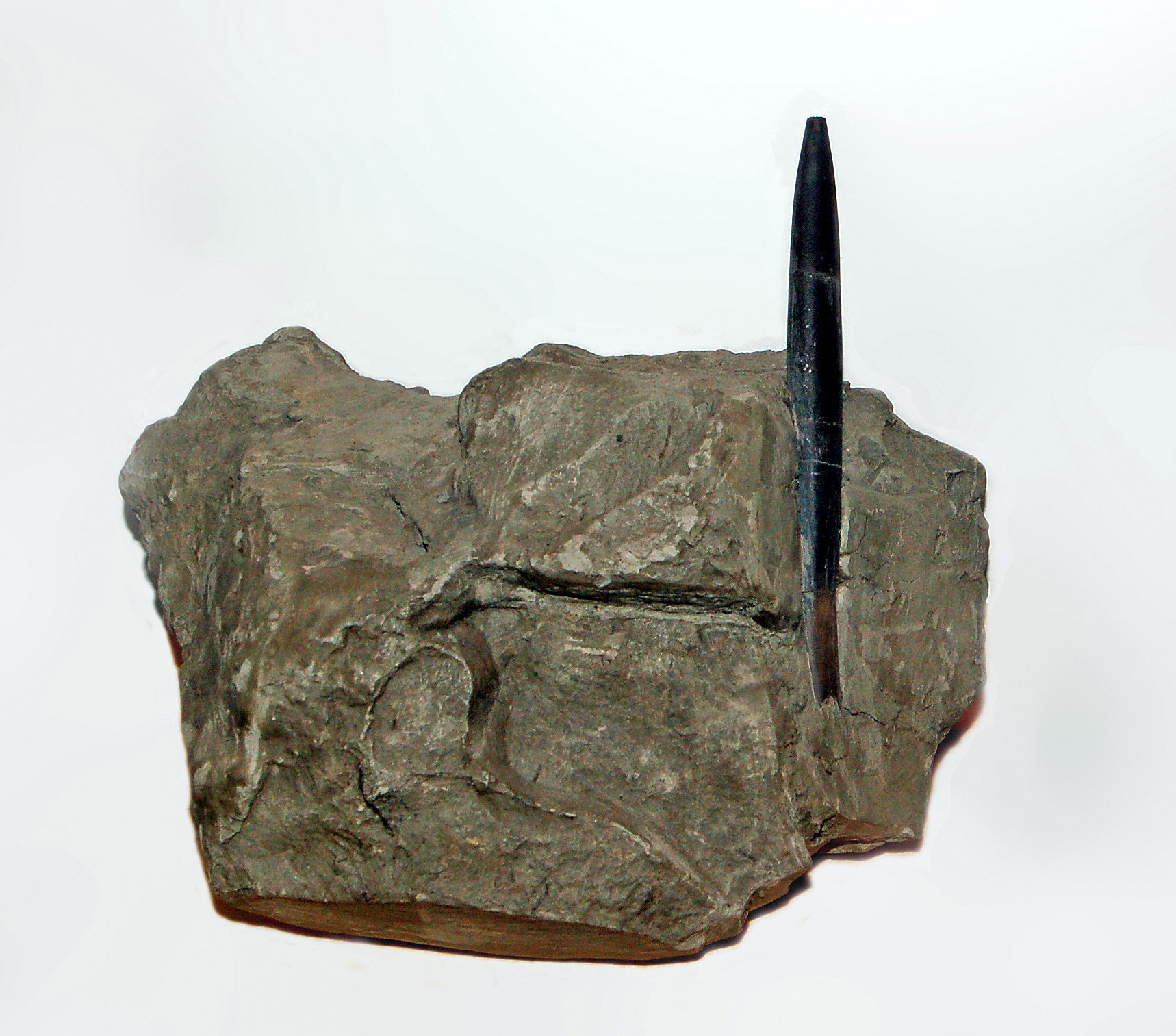
- Belemnites hastatus from Switzerland

Scientific classification
- Kingdom: Animalia
- Phylum: Mollusca
- Class: Cephalopoda
- Superorder: †Belemnoidea
- Genus: †Belemnites; Lamarck, 1799

Type species
- †Belemnites paxillosus Lamarck, 1801

= Belemnites (genus) =

Belemnites Temporal range: Early Jurassic

Genus of an extinct group of cephalopods

Belemnites is a genus of an extinct group of cephalopods belonging to the order Belemnitida. These cephalopods existed in the Early Jurassic period from the Hettangian age (196.5–199.6 mya) to the Toarcian age (175.6–183.0). They were fast-moving nektonic carnivores.

The scientific name Belemnites of this genus should not be confused with the common name of the cephalopods included in the extinct order Belemnitida (commonly referred to as "Belemnites").

The name "belemnites" was used informally for fossils of the order Belemnitida since 1546 but is recognized as having been used in formal classification in 1799 by French palaeontologist Jean-Baptiste Lamarck, later naming the type species B. paxillosus in 1801. It was later assigned to its own family Belemnitidae by French naturalist Alcide d'Orbigny in 1845. However, the International Commission on Zoological Nomenclature eventually ruled out the family as unavailable and invalidated formal usage of Belemnites as a genus name.

== Species ==
- Belemnites calloviensis
- Belemnites hastati
- Belemnites hastatus
- Belemnites paxillosus

== See also ==
- Belemnite
- List of belemnites
