= Champagne wine region =

Wine region of France

Coordinates: 49°N 4°E

Viticultural zones in the Champagne region

The wine region within the historical province of Champagne in the northeast of France is best known for the production of champagne, the sparkling white wine that bears the region's name. EU law and the laws of most countries reserve the term "champagne" exclusively for wines that come from this region located about 160 kilometres (100 miles) east of Paris. The viticultural boundaries of Champagne are legally defined and split into five wine-producing districts within the historical province: Aube, Côte des Blancs, Côte de Sézanne, Montagne de Reims, and Vallée de la Marne. The city of Reims and the town of Épernay are the commercial centers of the area. Reims is famous for its cathedral, the venue of the coronation of the French kings and a UNESCO World Heritage Site.

Located at the northern edges of France, the history of the Champagne wine region has had a significant role in the development of this unique terroir. The area's proximity to Paris promoted the region's economic success in its wine trade but also put the villages and vineyards in the path of marching armies on their way to the French capital. Despite the frequency of these military conflicts, the region developed a reputation for quality wine production in the early Middle Ages and was able to continue that reputation as the region's producers began making sparkling wine with the advent of the great champagne houses in the 17th and 18th centuries. The principal grapes grown in the region include Chardonnay, Pinot noir, and Pinot Meunier. Pinot noir is the most widely planted grape in the Aube region and grows very well in Montagne de Reims. Pinot Meunier is the dominant grape in the Vallée de la Marne region. The Côte des Blancs is dedicated almost exclusively to Chardonnay.

The unique, chalky landscape of the Champagne wine region and the resulting agro-industrial system led to the development of sparkling wines like champagne in the 17th century. As a result, many of the production sites and wine houses in the region were inscribed on the UNESCO World Heritage List in 2015 as part of the Champagne hillsides, houses and cellars site.

== Geography and climate ==
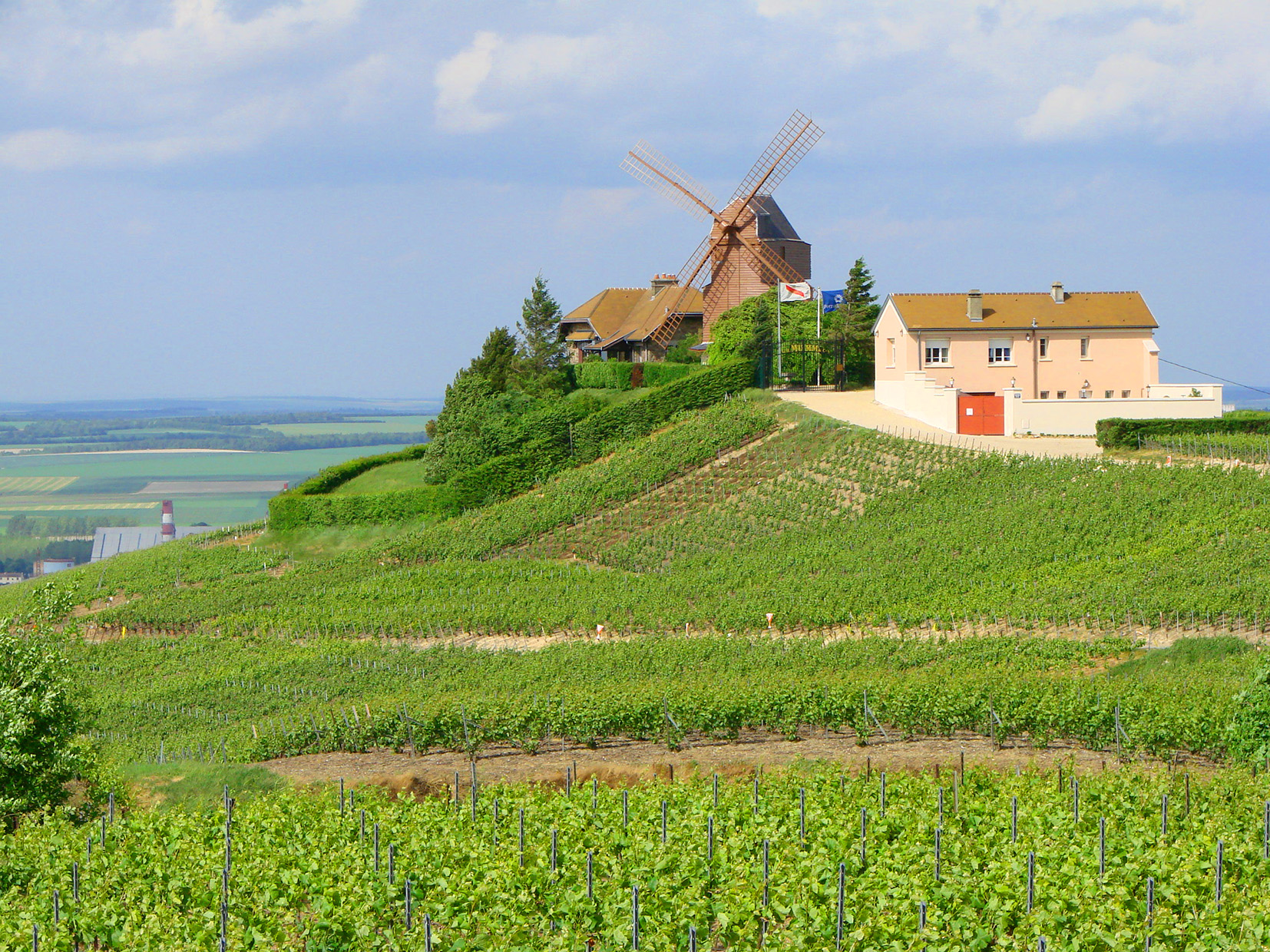
Champagne vineyards in Verzenay in the Montagne de Reims subregion

The Champagne province is located near the northern limits of the wine world along the 49th parallel. The high latitude and mean annual temperature of 10 °C (50 °F) creates a difficult environment for wine grapes to fully ripen. Ripening is aided by the presence of forests which helps to stabilize temperatures and maintain moisture in the soil. The cool temperatures serve to produce high levels of acidity in the resulting grape which is ideal for sparkling wine.

During the growing season, the mean July temperature is 18 °C (66 °F). The average annual rainfall is 630 mm (25 inches), with 45 mm (1.8 inches) falling during the harvest month of September. Throughout the year, growers must be mindful of the hazards of fungal disease and early spring frost.

Ancient oceans left behind chalk subsoil deposits when they receded 70 million years ago. Earthquakes that rocked the region over 10 million years ago pushed the marine sediments of belemnite fossils up to the surface to create the belemnite chalk terrain. The belemnite in the soil allows it to absorb heat from the sun and gradually release it during the night as well as providing good drainage. This soil contributes to the lightness and finesse that is characteristic of Champagne wine. The Aube area is an exception with predominately clay based soil. The chalk is also used in the construction of underground cellars that can keep the wines cool through the bottle maturation process.

== History ==
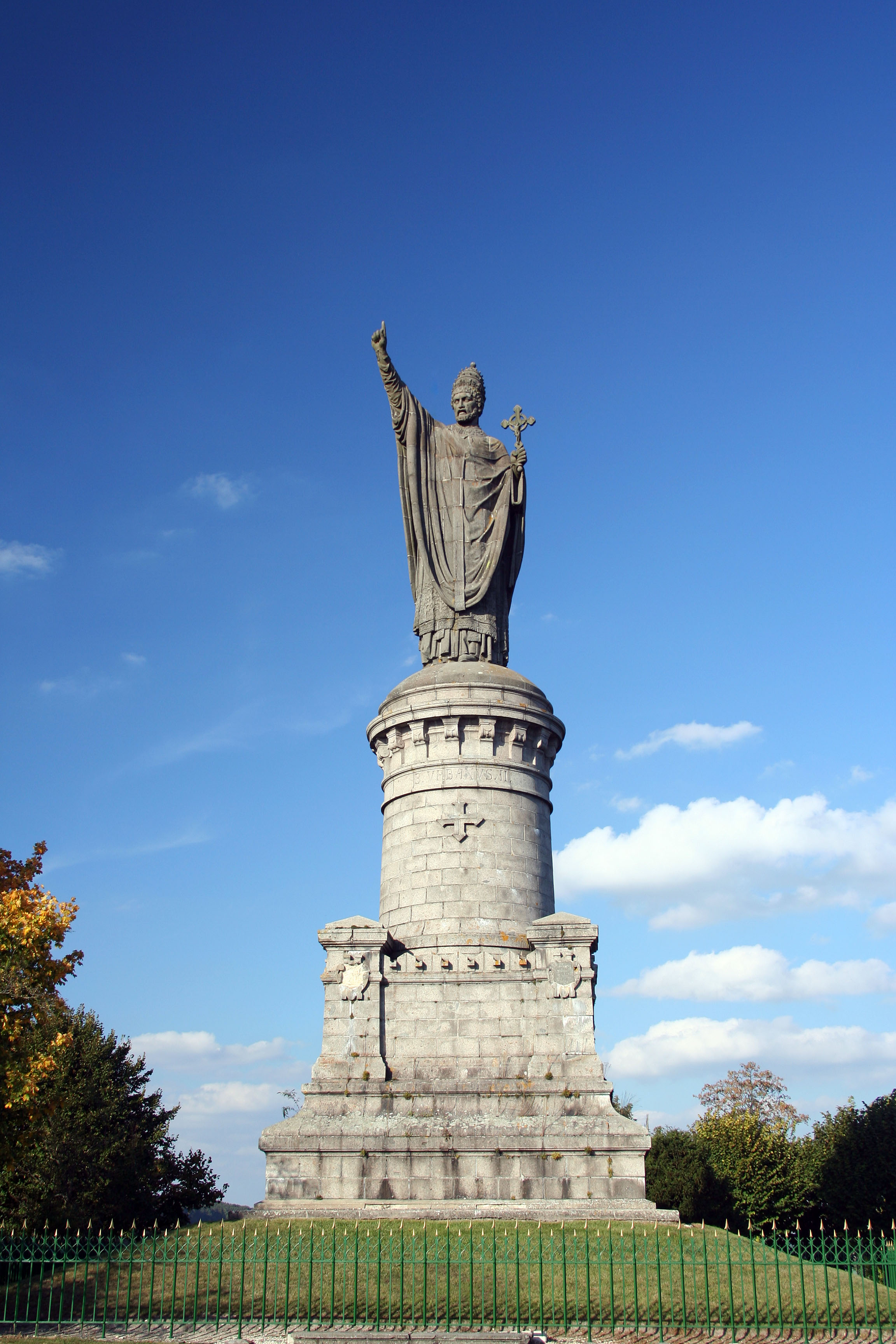
Statue of Pope Urban II in Champagne

The Carolingian reign saw periods of prosperity for the Champagne region beginning with Charlemagne's encouragement for the area to start planting vines and continuing with the coronation of his son Louis the Pious at Reims. The tradition of crowning kings at Reims contributed to the reputation of the wines that came from this area. The Counts of Champagne ruled the area as an independent county from 950 to 1316. In 1314, the last Count of Champagne assumed the throne as King Louis X of France and the region became part of the Crown territories.

=== Military conflicts ===
The location of Champagne played a large role in its historical prominence as it served as a "crossroads" for both military and trade routes. This also made the area open to devastation and destruction during military conflicts that were frequently waged in the area. In 451 A.D. near Châlons-en-Champagne, Attila and the Huns were defeated by an alliance of Roman legions, Franks and Visigoths. This defeat was a turning point in the Huns' invasion of Europe.

During the Hundred Years' War, the land was repeatedly ravaged and devastated by battles. The Abbey of Hautvillers, including its vineyards, was destroyed in 1560 during the War of Religion between the Huguenots and Catholics. This was followed by conflicts during the Thirty Year War and the Fronde Civil War where soldiers and mercenaries held the area in occupation. It was not until the 1660s, during the reign of Louis XIV, that the region saw enough peace to allow advances in sparkling wine production to take place.

=== History of wine production ===
Champagne wine

The region's reputation for wine production dates back to the Middle Ages when Pope Urban II ( ruled 1088-1099 AD/CE ), a native Champenois, declared that the wine of Aÿ in the Marne département was the best wine produced in the world. For a time Aÿ was used as a shorthand designation for wines from the entire Champagne region, similar to the use of Beaune for the wines of Burgundy. The poet Henry d'Andeli's work La Bataille des Vins rated wines from the towns of Épernay, Hautvillers and Reims as some of the best in Europe. As the region's reputation grew, popes and royalty sought to own pieces of the land with Pope Leo X, Francis I of France, Charles V of Spain, and Henry VIII of England all owning vineyard land in the region. A batch of wine from Aÿ received in 1518 by Henry VIII's chancellor, Cardinal Thomas Wolsey, is the first recorded export of wine from the Champagne region to England.

The still wines of the area were highly prized in Paris under the designation of vins de la rivière and vins de la montagne- wines of the river and wines of the mountain in reference to the wooded terrain and the river Marne which carried the wines down to the Seine and into Paris. The region was in competition with Burgundy for the Flemish wine trade and tried to capitalize on Reims' location along the trade route from Beaune. In the 15th century, Pinot noir became heavily planted in the area. The resulting red wine had difficulty comparing well to the richness and coloring of Burgundy wines, despite the addition of elderberries to deepen the color. This led to a greater focus on white wines.

The Champagne house of Gosset was founded as a still wine producer in 1584 and is the oldest Champagne house still in operation today. Ruinart was founded in 1729 and was soon followed by Chanoine Frères (1730), Taittinger (1734), Moët et Chandon (1743) and Veuve Clicquot (1772).

The nineteenth century saw an explosive growth in Champagne production going from a regional production of 300,000 bottles a year in 1800 to 20 million bottles in 1850.

==== Rivalry with Burgundy ====
A strong influence on Champagne wine production was the centuries-old rivalry between the region and Burgundy. From the key market of Paris to the palace of Louis XIV at Versailles, proponents of Champagne and Burgundy would compete for dominance. For most of his life, Louis XIV would drink only Champagne wine with the support of his doctor Antoine d'Aquin who advocated the King drink Champagne with every meal for the benefit of his health. As the King aged and his ailments increased, competing doctors would propose alternative treatments with alternative wines, to soothe the King's ills. One of these doctors, Guy-Crescent Fagon conspired with the King's mistress to oust d'Aquin and have himself appointed as Royal Doctor. Fagon quickly attributed the King's continuing ailments to Champagne and ordered that only Burgundy wine must be served at the royal table.

This development had a ripple effect throughout both regions and in the Paris markets. Both Champagne and Burgundy were deeply concerned with the "healthiness" reputation of their wines, even to the extent of paying medical students to write theses touting the health benefit of their wines. These theses were then used as advertising pamphlets that were sent to merchants and customers. The Faculty of Medicine in Reims published several papers to refute Fagon's claim that Burgundy wine was healthier than Champagne. In response, Burgundian winemakers hired physician Jean-Baptiste de Salins, dean of the medical school in Beaune, to speak to a packed auditorium at the Paris Faculty of Medicine. Salins spoke favorably of Burgundy wine's deep color and robust nature and compared it to the pale red color of Champagne and the "instability" of the wine to travel long distances and the flaws of the bubbles from when secondary fermentation would take place. The text of his speech was published in newspapers and pamphlets throughout France and had a damaging effect on Champagne sales.

The war of words would continue for another 130 years with endless commentary from doctors, poets, playwrights and authors all arguing for their favorite region and their polemics being reproduced in advertisements for Burgundy and Champagne. On a few occasions, the two regions were on the brink of civil war. A turning point occurred when several Champagne wine makers abandoned efforts to produce red wine in favor of focusing on harnessing the effervescent nature of sparkling Champagne. As the bubbles became more popular, doctors throughout France and Europe commented on the health benefits of the sparkling bubbles which were said to cure malaria. As more Champenois winemakers embarked on this new and completely different wine style, the rivalry with Burgundy mellowed and eventually waned.

== Classifications and vineyard regulations ==
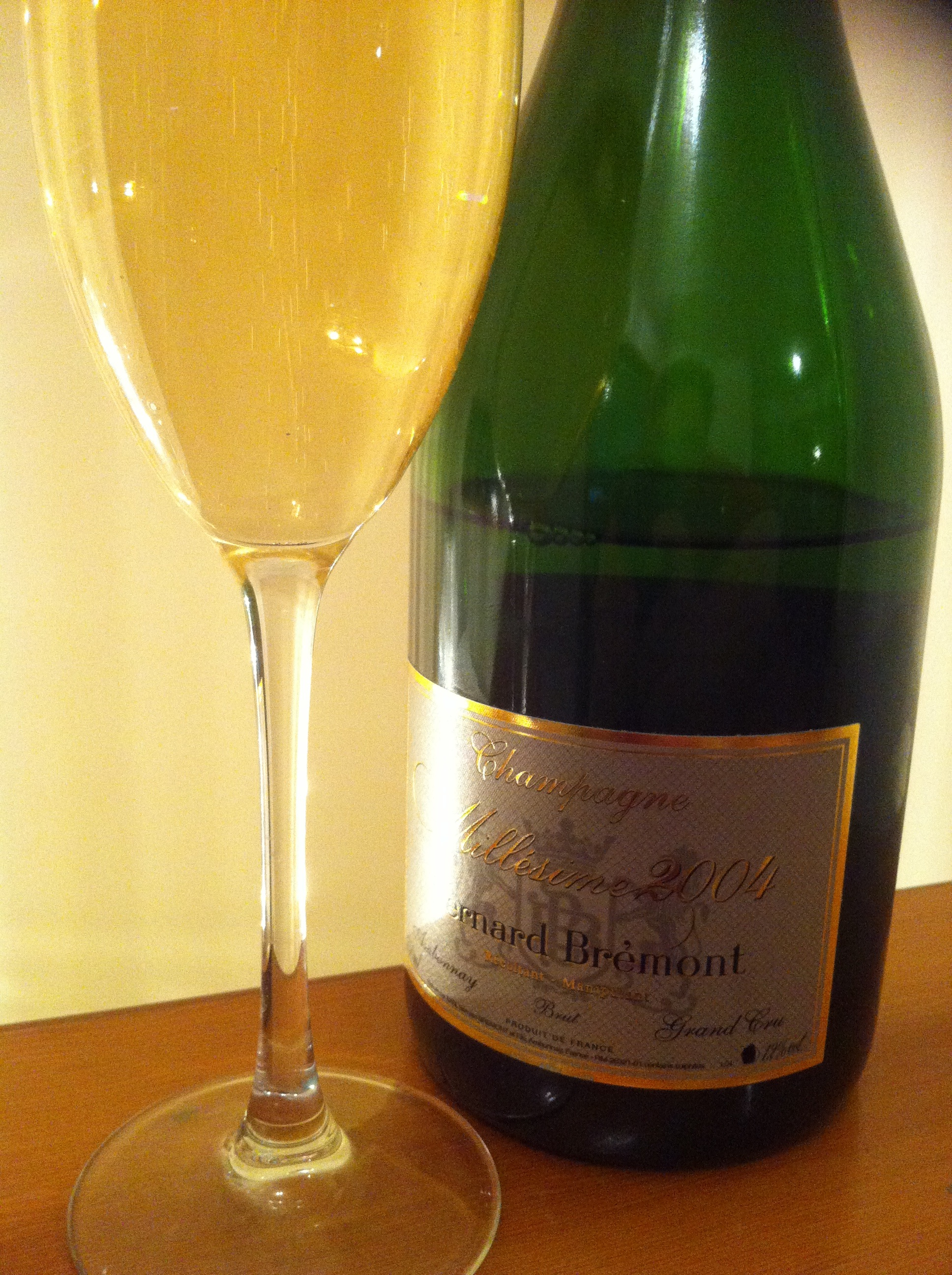
Grand Cru Champagne from the village of Ambonnay

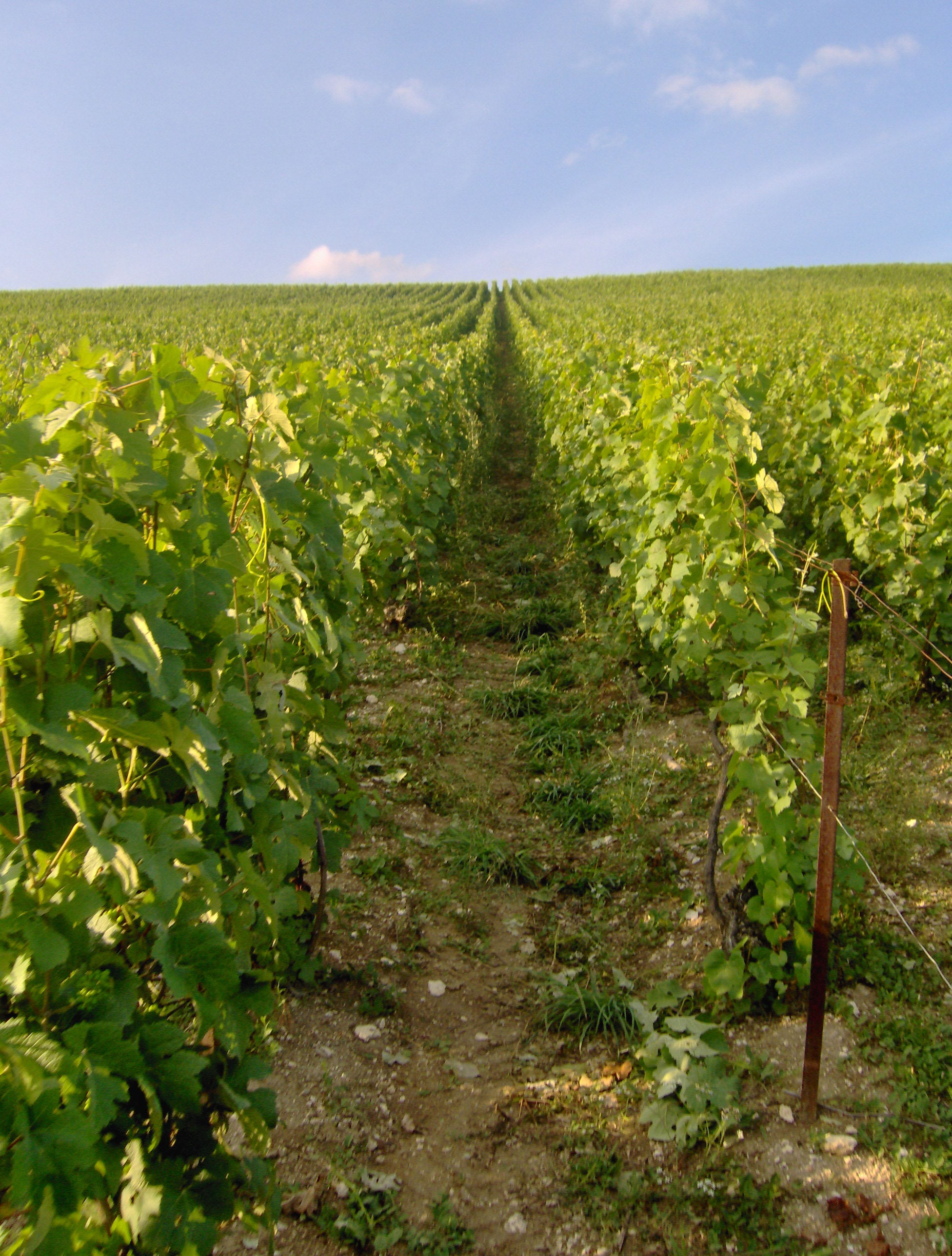
Vineyard in Champagne

In 1927, viticultural boundaries of Champagne were legally defined and split into five wine-producing districts: The Aube, Côte des Blancs, Côte de Sézanne, Montagne de Reims, and Vallée de la Marne. This area covered in 2008 33,500 hectares (84,000 acres) of vineyards around 319 villages that were home to 5,000 growers who made their own wine and 14,000 growers who only sold grapes.

The different districts produce grapes of varying characteristics that are blended by the Champagne houses to create their distinct house styles. The Pinots of the Montagne de Reims that are planted on northern facing slopes are known for their high levels of acid and the delicacy they add to the blend. The grapes on the southern facing slope add more power and character. Grapes across the district contribute to the bouquet and headiness. The abundance of southern facing slopes in the Vallée de la Marne produces the ripest wines with full aroma. The Côte des Blancs grapes are known for their finesse and the freshness they add to blends with the extension of the nearby Côte de Sézanne offering similar though slightly less distinguished traits.

In 1941, the Comité Interprofessionnel du Vin de Champagne (CIVC) was formed with the purpose of protecting Champagne's reputation and marketing forces as well as setting up and monitoring regulations for vineyard production and vinification methods. Champagne is the only region that is permitted to exclude AOC or Appellation d'Origine Contrôlée from their labels.

For each vintage, the CIVC rated the villages of the area based on the quality of their grapes and vineyards. The rating was then used to determine the price and the percentage of the price that growers get. The Grand Cru rated vineyards received 100 percent rating which entitled the grower to 100% of the price. Premier Crus were vineyards with 90–99% ratings while Deuxième Crus received 80–89% ratings. Under appellation rules, around 4,000 kilograms (8,800 pounds) of grapes can be pressed to create up to 673 gallons (either 2,550 L or 3,060 L) of juice. The first 541 gallons (either 2,050 L or 2,460 L) are the cuvée and the next 132 gallons (either 500 L or 600 L) are the taille. Prior to 1992, a second taille of 44 gallons (either 167 L or 200 L) was previously allowed. For vintage Champagne, 100% of the grapes must come from that vintage year while non-vintage wine is a blend of vintages. Vintage champagne must spend a minimum of three years of aging. There are no regulations about how long it must spend on its lees, but some of the premier Champagne houses keep their wines on lees for upwards of five to ten years. Non-vintage Champagne must spend a minimum of 15 months of aging but only a minimum of 12 months on the lees. Most of the Champagne houses keep their wines on the lees throughout the entire aging period because it is more expensive to bottle the wine before aging it, as opposed to bottling and shipping the product in a single step at the end of the fermentation-and-aging process.

=== Revision of the Champagne region ===
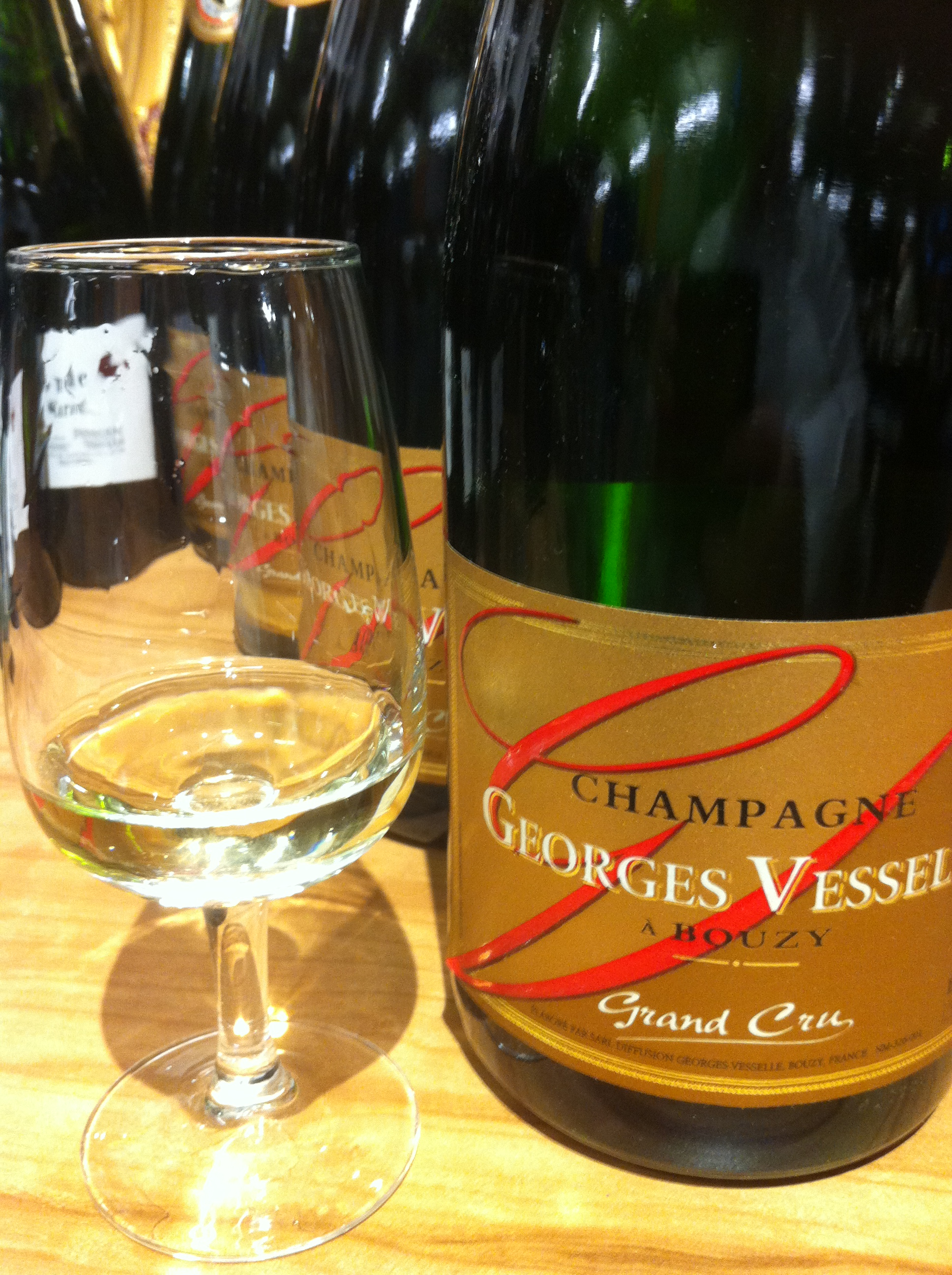
Grand Cru Champagne from the village of Bouzy

The worldwide demand for Champagne had been continuously increasing throughout the 1990s and early 2000s. A record in worldwide shipping of Champagne (including domestic French consumption) of 327 million bottles was set in 1999 in anticipation of end of millennium celebrations, and a new record was set in 2007 at 338.7 million bottles. Since the entire vineyard area authorized by the 1927 AOC regulations is now under cultivation, various ways of expanding the production have been considered. The allowed yield was increased (to a maximum of 15,500 kg per hectare during an experimental period from 2007 to 2011) and the possibility of revising the production region was examined.

After an extensive review of vineyard conditions in and around the existing Champagne region, INAO presented a proposal to revise the region on March 14, 2008. The proposal was prepared by a group of five experts in the subjects of history, geography, geology, phytosociology and agronomy, working from 2005. The proposal means expanding the region to cover vineyards in 357 rather than 319 villages. This was to be achieved by adding vineyards in forty villages while simultaneously removing two villages in the Marne department that were included in the 1927 regulations, Germaine and Orbais-l'Abbaye.

The proposed 40 new Champagne villages are located in four départements:

- 22 in Marne: Baslieux-les-Fismes, Blacy, Boissy-le-Repos, Bouvancourt, Breuil-sur-Vesle, Bussy-le-Repos, Champfleury, Courlandon, Courcy, Courdemanges, Fismes, Huiron, La Ville-sous-Orbais, Le Thoult-Trosnay, Loivre, Montmirail, Mont-sur-Courville, Peas, Romain, Saint-Loup, Soulanges, and Ventelay.
- 15 in Aube: Arrelles, Balnot-la-Grange, Bossancourt, Bouilly, Étourvy, Fontvannes, Javernant, Laines-aux-Bois, Macey, Messon, Prugny, Saint-Germain-l'Épine, Souligny, Torvilliers and Villery.
- Two in Haute-Marne: Champcourt and Harricourt.
- One, Marchais-en-Brie, in Aisne.

The INAO proposal was to be subject to review before being made into law and was immediately questioned in numerous public comments. The mayor of one of the villages to be delisted, Germaine, immediately appealed against INAO's proposal, with the possibility of additional appeals by vineyard owners. The initial review process was expected to be finished by early 2009. This would be followed by another review of the specific parcels that will be added or deleted from the appellation. The earliest vineyard plantings were expected around 2015, with their product being marketed from around 2021. However, the price of land that are allowed to be used for Champagne production was expected to immediately rise from 5,000 to one million euro per hectare.

While some critics had feared the revision of the Champagne region is about expanding production irrespective of quality, British wine writer and Champagne expert Tom Stevenson pointed out that the proposed additions constituted a consolidation rather than expansion. The villages under discussion are situated in gaps inside the perimeter of the existing Champagne regions rather than outside it.

As of 2019, the expansion had not happened, with a final decision expected in 2023 or 2024.

In October 2026, the Syndicat général des vignerons de la Champagne (SGV) voted against the proposed revision of the Champagne appellation boundaries. Their decision reflects a weakening French market and shifting climatic conditions in the region.

== Production other than sparkling wine ==
While totally dominating the region's production, sparkling Champagne is not the only product that is made from the region's grapes. Non-sparkling still wines, like those made around the village Bouzy, are sold under the appellation label Coteaux Champenois. There is also a rosé appellation in the region, Rosé des Riceys. The regional vin de liqueur is called Ratafia de Champagne. Since the profit of making sparkling Champagne from the region's grape is now much higher, production of these non-sparkling wines and fortified wines is very small.

The pomace from the grape pressing is used to make Marc de Champagne, and in this case the production does not compete with that of Champagne, since the pomace is a by-product of wine production.

== Traditions ==
The end of harvest in Champagne is marked by a celebration known as la Fête du Cochelet. At Reims, "St Jean is the patron of the cellar staff and those engaged in work connected with Champagne."

== See also ==
- Champagne Riots
- Oeil de Perdrix, wine style believed to have been invented by the Champenois
- 2023 Grape Harvest of Shame
