= Aÿ =

Commune in Marne, France

- Part of Aÿ-Champagne
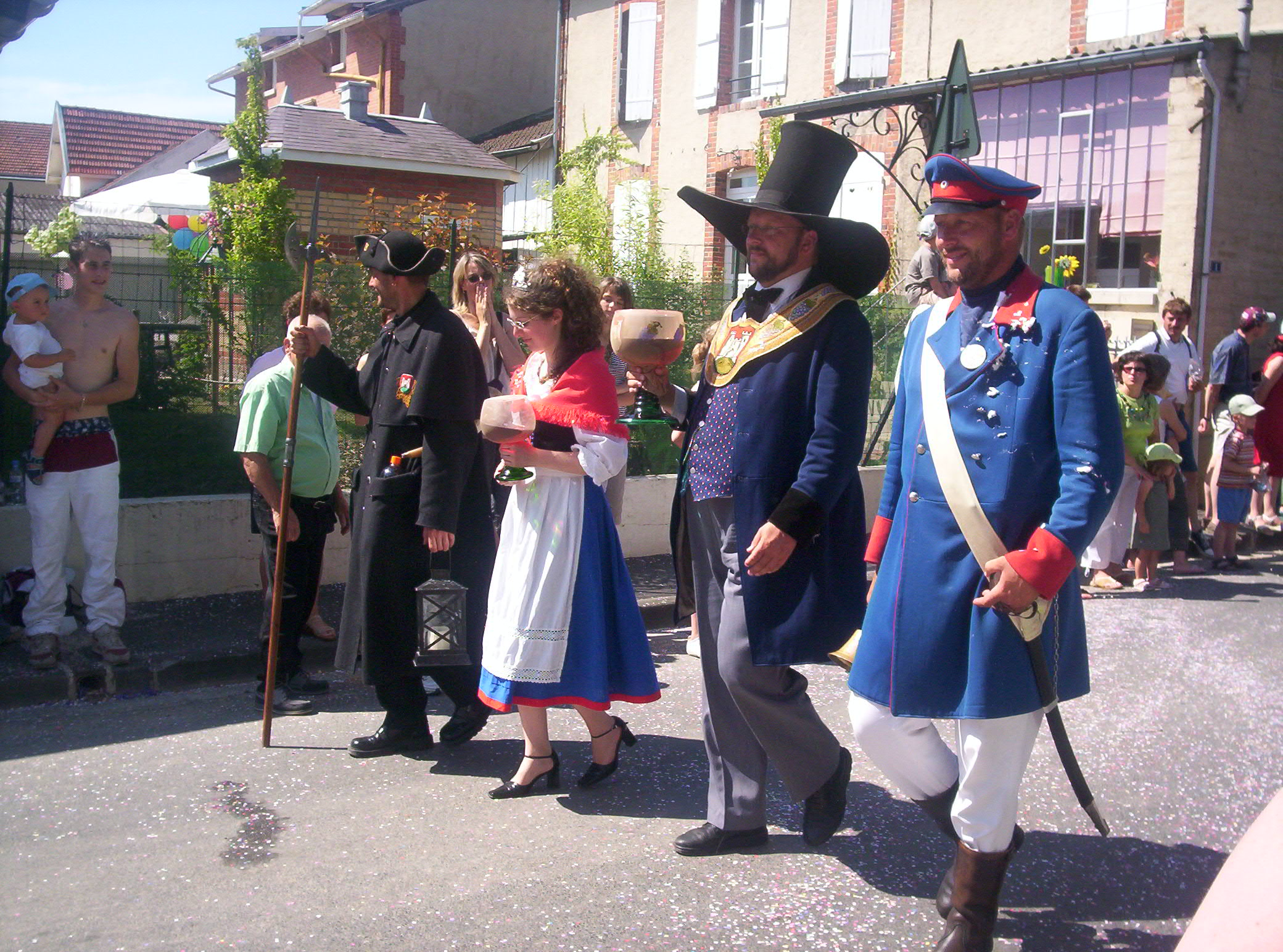

- Coat of arms
- Location of Aÿ
- Location within France Location within Grand Est
- Coordinates: 49°03′22″N 4°00′14″E
- Country: France
- Region: Grand Est
- Department: Marne
- Arrondissement: Épernay
- Canton: Épernay-1
- Commune: Aÿ-Champagne
- Area^{1}: 10.43 km^{2} (4.03 sq mi)
- Elevation: 76 m (249 ft)
- Population (2022): 3,508
  - Density: 336.3/km^{2} (871.1/sq mi)
- Time zone: UTC+01:00 (CET)
  - Summer (DST): UTC+02:00 (CEST)
- Postal code: 51160
- ^{1} French Land Register data, which excludes lakes, ponds, glaciers > 1 km^{2} (0.386 sq mi or 247 acres) and river estuaries.

Aÿ (French pronunciation: [aˑji]; also Ay) is a former commune in the Marne department in northeastern France. In January 2016, it was merged into the new commune Aÿ-Champagne.

== Champagne ==
Aÿ is most famous as a centre of the production of Champagne. Aÿ's vineyards are located in the Vallée de la Marne subregion of Champagne, and are classified as Grand Cru (100%) in the Champagne vineyard classification. The vineyards, harvest huts, presses, and cellars in the region were inscribed on the UNESCO World Heritage List in 2015 as part of the Champagne hillsides, houses and cellars site, because of the region's testimony to the development of champagne. Many prestigious Champagne houses own vineyards in the immediate vicinity, and several producers are located in Aÿ, including Ayala and Bollinger.

== Population ==
Historical population

| Year | Pop. | ±% p.a. |
|---|---|---|
| 1793 | 2,516 | — |
| 1800 | 2,593 | +0.43% |
| 1806 | 2,548 | −0.29% |
| 1821 | 2,507 | −0.11% |
| 1831 | 2,727 | +0.84% |
| 1836 | 2,810 | +0.60% |
| 1841 | 3,130 | +2.18% |
| 1846 | 3,415 | +1.76% |
| 1851 | 3,302 | −0.67% |
| 1856 | 3,268 | −0.21% |
| 1861 | 3,395 | +0.77% |
| 1866 | 3,573 | +1.03% |
| 1872 | 4,149 | +2.52% |
| 1876 | 5,063 | +5.10% |
| 1881 | 5,396 | +1.28% |
| 1886 | 6,075 | +2.40% |
| 1891 | 6,701 | +1.98% |
| 1896 | 7,061 | +1.05% |

| Year | Pop. | ±% p.a. |
|---|---|---|
| 1901 | 7,052 | −0.03% |
| 1906 | 7,391 | +0.94% |
| 1911 | 7,212 | −0.49% |
| 1921 | 7,911 | +0.93% |
| 1926 | 7,267 | −1.68% |
| 1931 | 6,995 | −0.76% |
| 1936 | 6,666 | −0.96% |
| 1946 | 6,272 | −0.61% |
| 1954 | 6,806 | +1.03% |
| 1962 | 6,682 | −0.23% |
| 1968 | 4,884 | −5.09% |
| 1975 | 4,883 | −0.00% |
| 1982 | 4,773 | −0.32% |
| 1990 | 4,318 | −1.24% |
| 1999 | 4,315 | −0.01% |
| 2013 | 3,978 | −0.58% |
| 2022 | 3,508 | −1.39% |

Source: EHESS and INSEE

== International relations ==
Aÿ is twinned with:

- Besigheim, Germany
- Newton Abbot, England
- Quaregnon, Belgium
- Sinalunga, Italy – since 2004

== Personalities ==
Aÿ was the birthplace of:

- Gaston Hanet Archambault (1877–1951), journalist for the New York Times
- Denise Schmandt-Besserat (1933–), French American cognitive archaeologist and art history professor
- Lucien Berland (1888–1962), entomologist and arachnologist
- René Lalique (1860–1945), glass designer
- Albert Lemaître, sporting motorist in 1890s and 1900s
- Stephen Rochefontaine (1755–1814), military engineer

Aÿ was the home of:

- Juan Romero (1919–2020), Spanish Legion d'Honneur recipient, anti-fascist Spanish Civil War veteran, and last survivor of the Nazis' Mauthausen concentration camp

== See also ==
- Bollinger
- Champagne Krug
- Classification of Champagne vineyards
- Communes of the Marne department
- List of short place names
