= Avenue de Champagne =

Thoroughfare in Épernay, France

Coordinates: 49°02′28″N 3°58′11″E

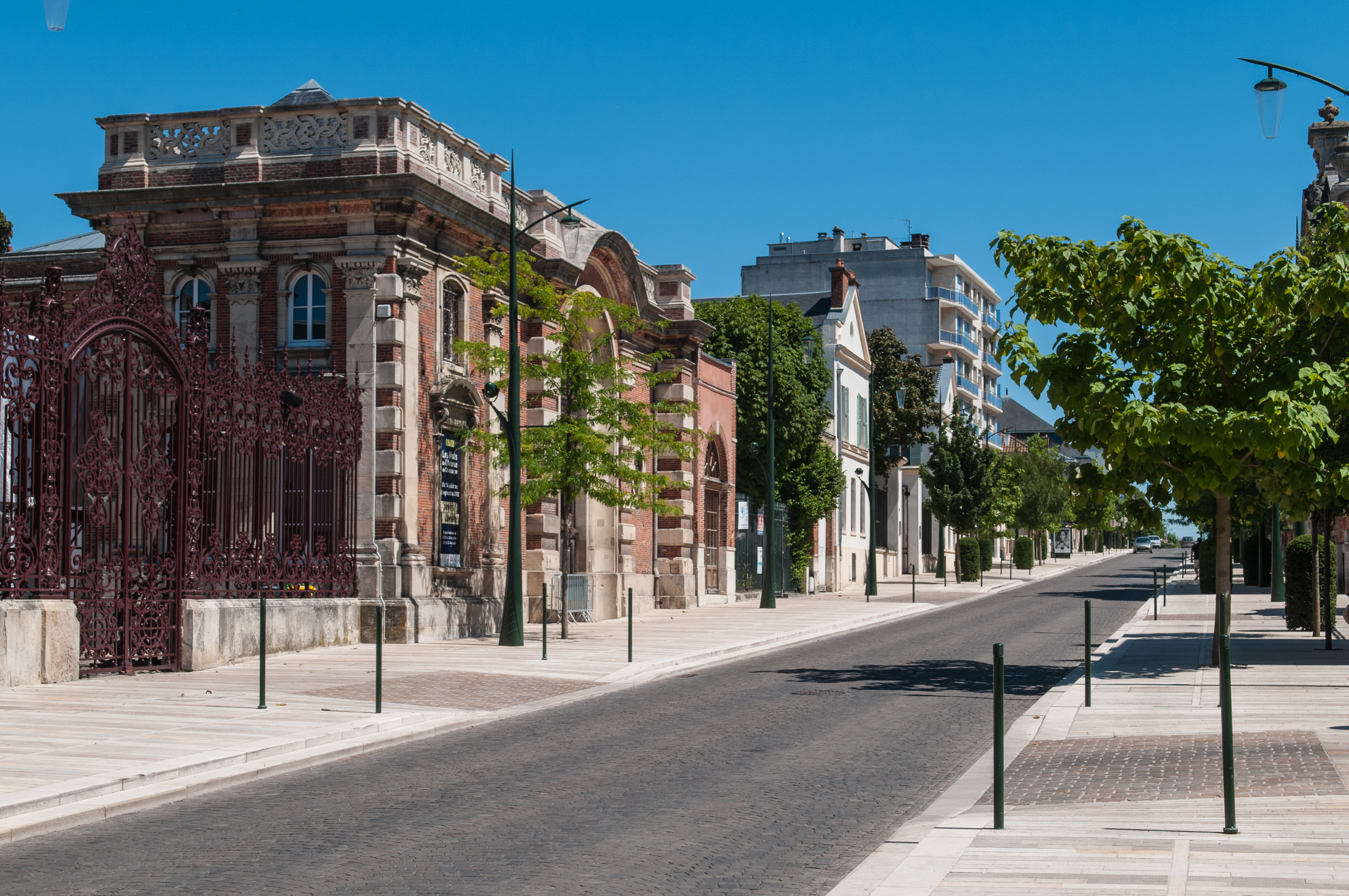
Avenue de Champagne, Épernay .

L'Avenue de Champagne (The Champagne Avenue) is a famous street located in Épernay, the 'Capital of champagne', in the Grand Est Région of France.

Its name derives from the presence of many leading champagne producers such as Moët et Chandon, Mercier and De Castellane. Located on a major historical trade route between France and Germany, the avenue attracted champagne merchants as early as the 18th century.

Residents say that this avenue is the most expensive in the world, more so than the Champs-Élysées in Paris, because of the millions of bottles of champagne stored in the kilometres of chalk cellars beneath it. The cellars and the above-ground part of the avenue were both inscribed on the UNESCO World Heritage List in 2015 (as part of the Champagne hillsides, houses and cellars site) for its testimony to the history of champagne, its development and sale, and the advent of a unique and preeminent agro-industrial system. The avenue also house a research center and Fort Chabrol that was founded to study and mitigate the effects of Grape phylloxera on the quality and production of champagne.

It has become a tourist attraction for Épernay and the Région; the biggest champagne producers organise visits to show how the drink is produced and stored.

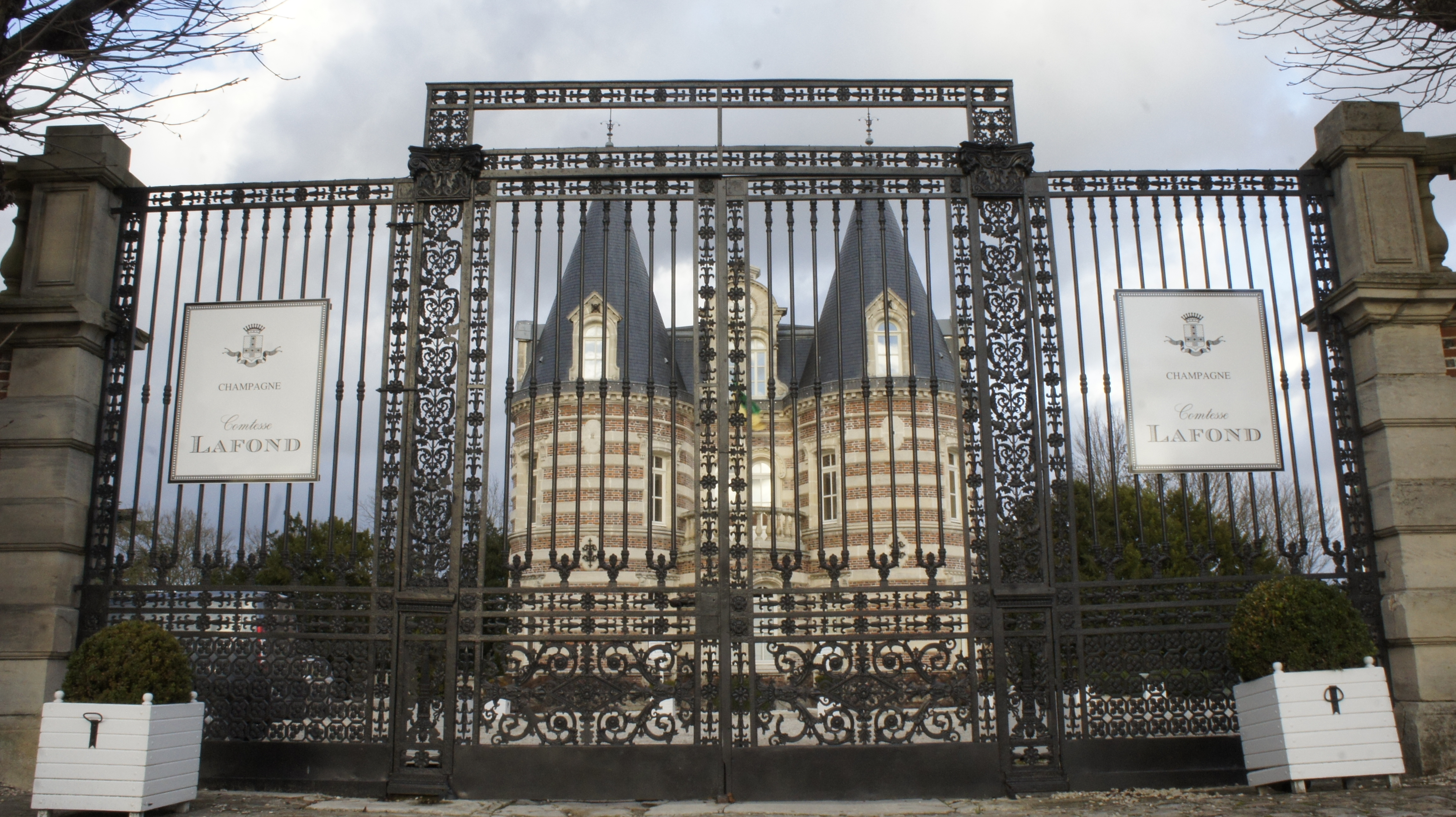
Lafond .

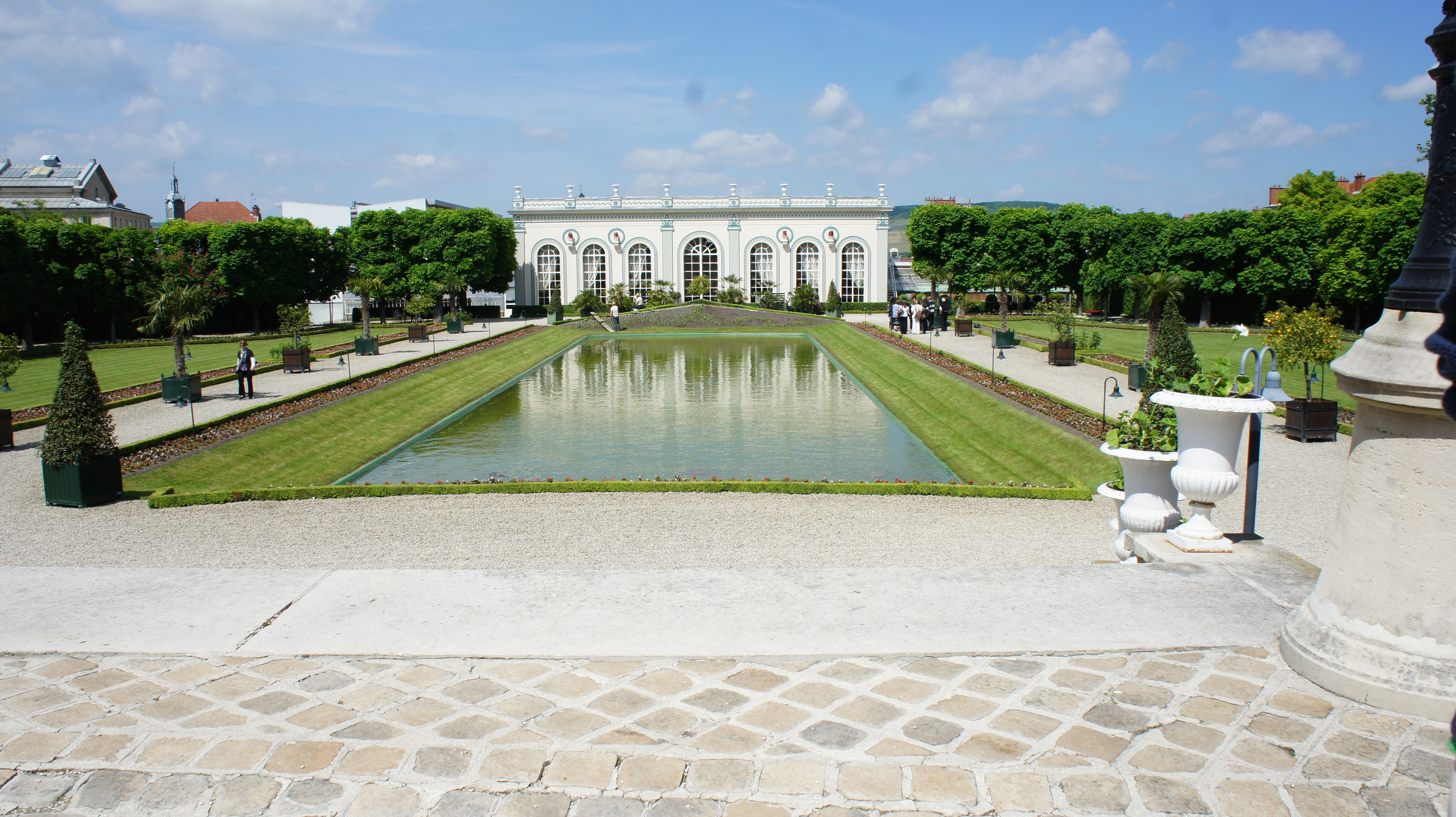
Moët & Chandon .

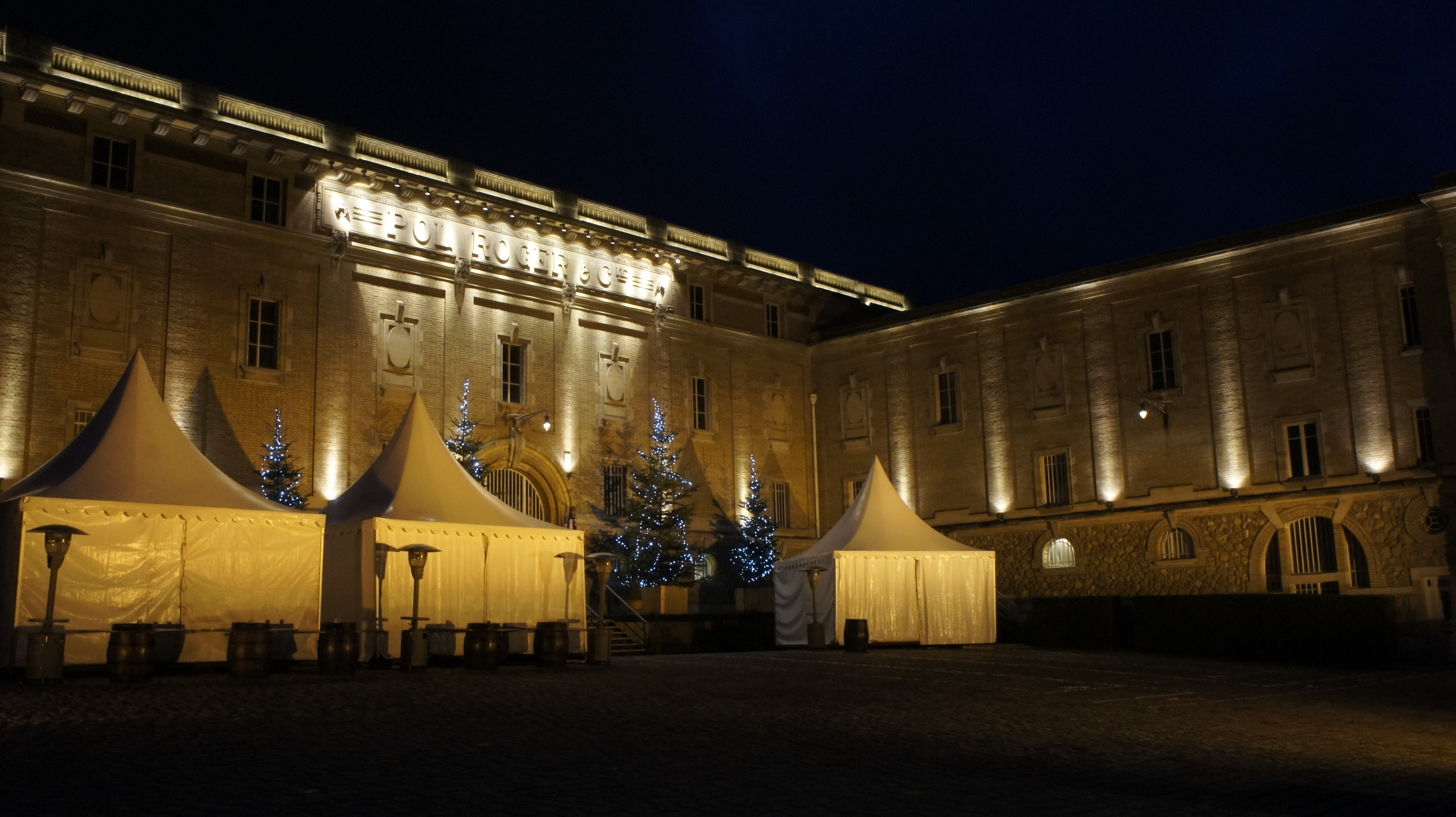
Pol Roger .

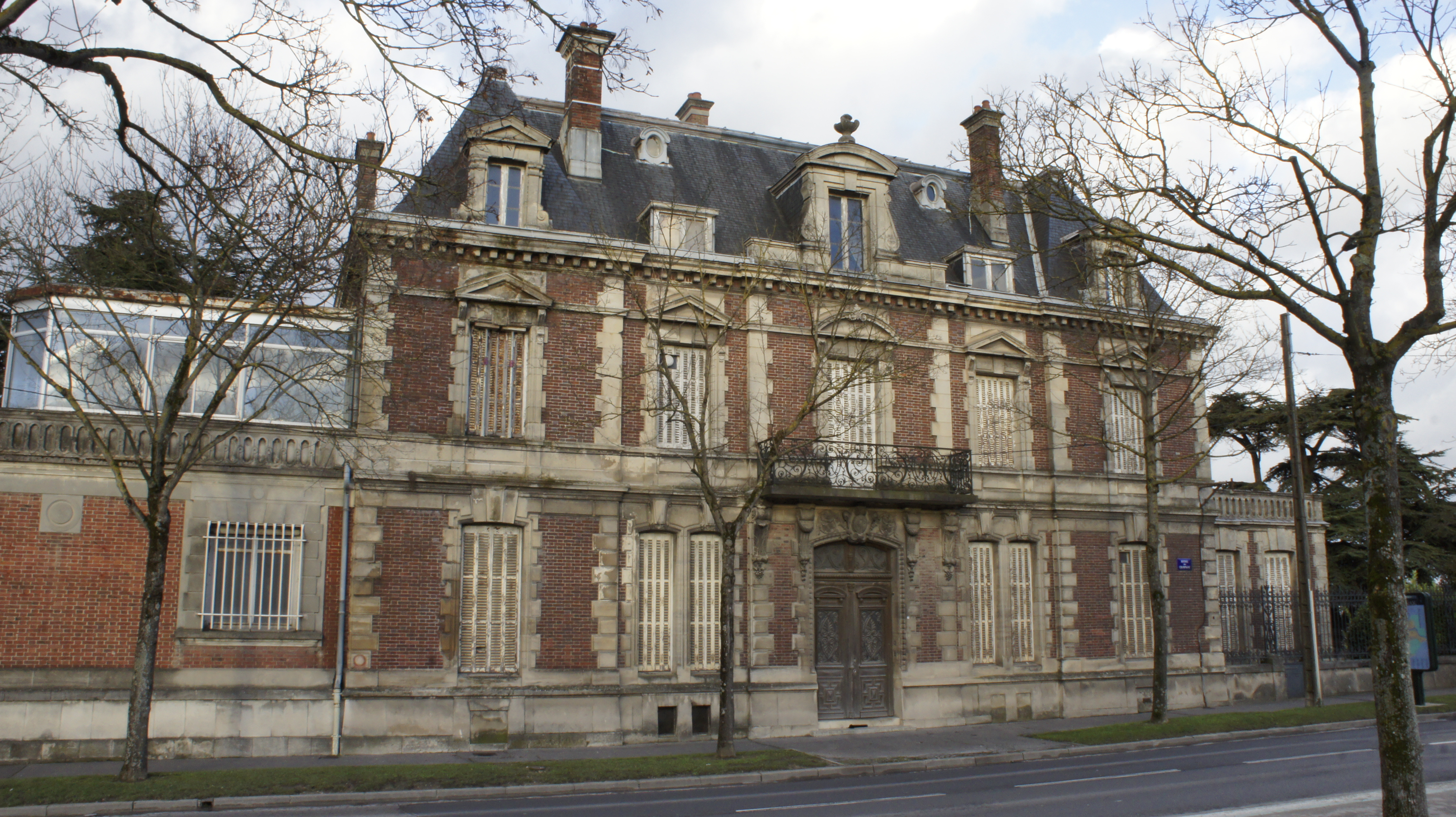
Mercier .

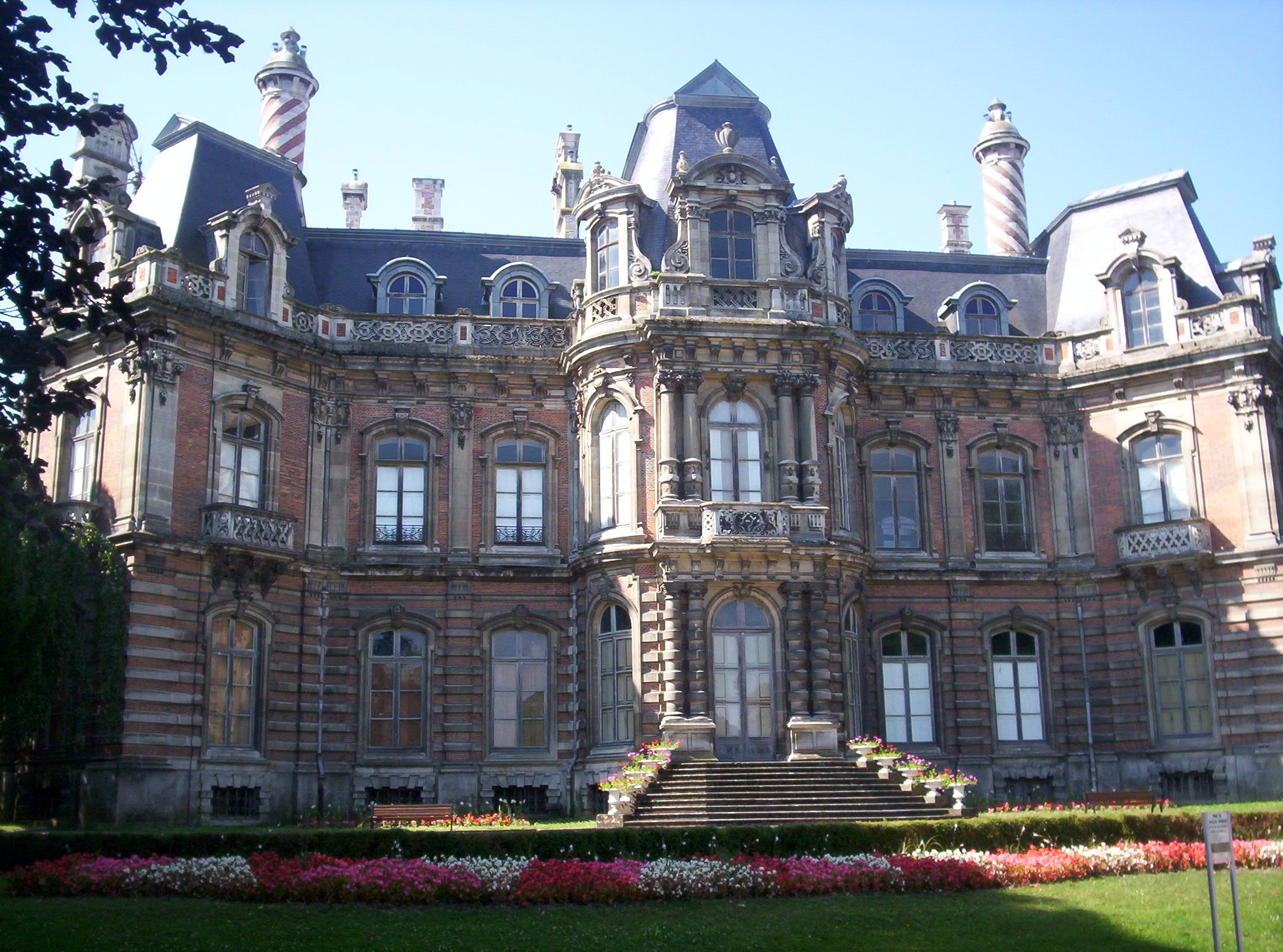
Perrier .

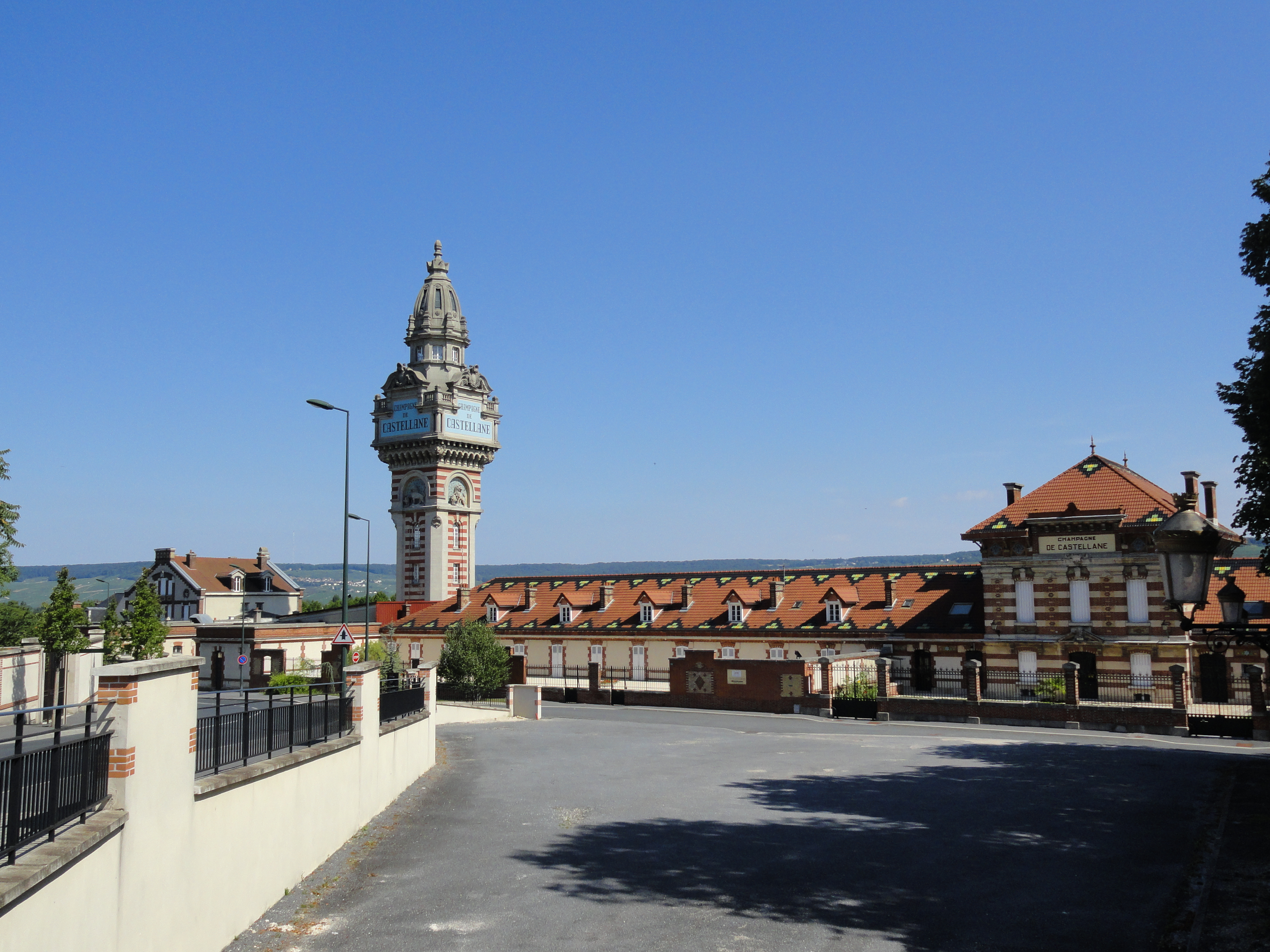
De Castellane .

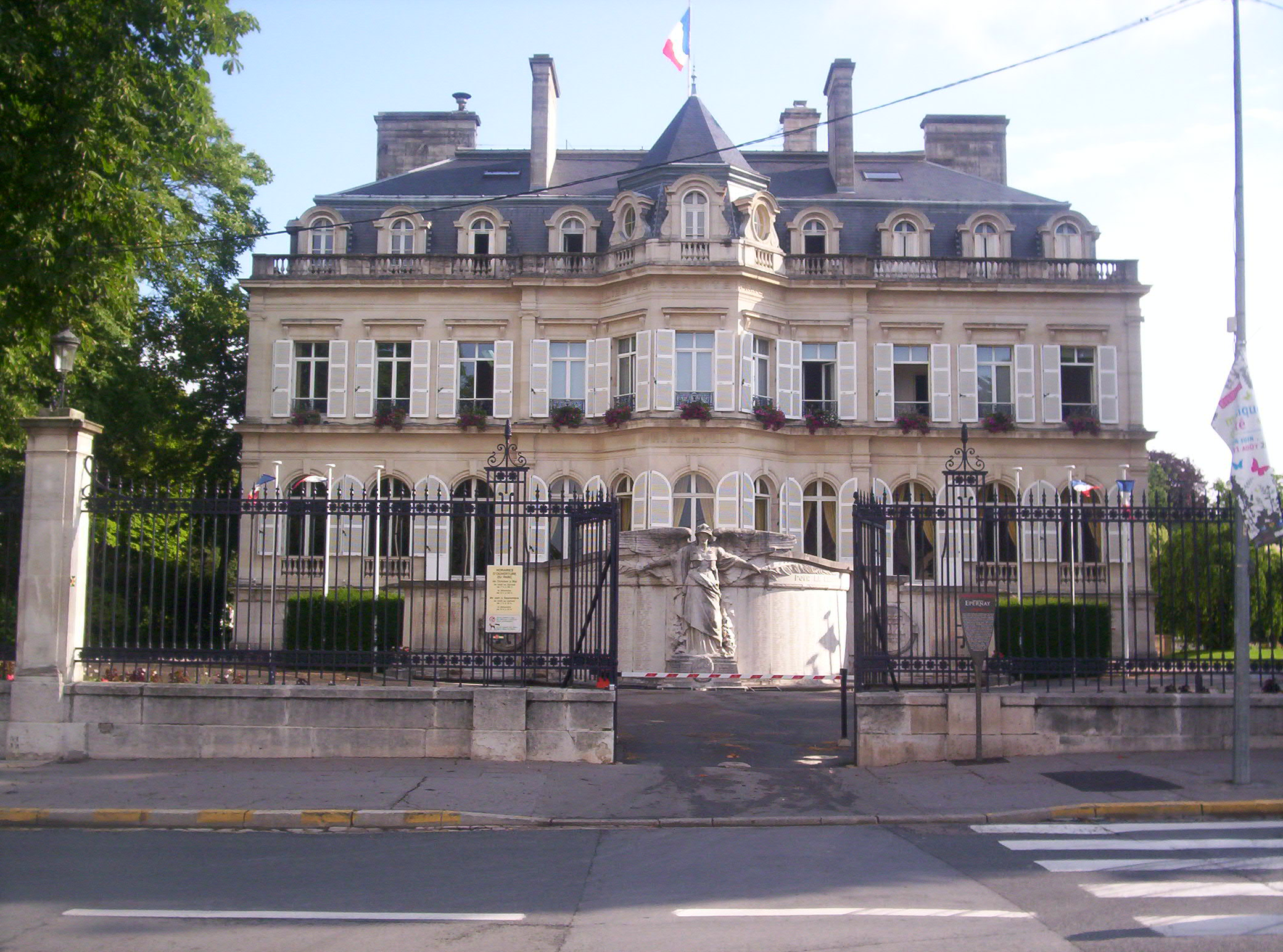
Town hall .

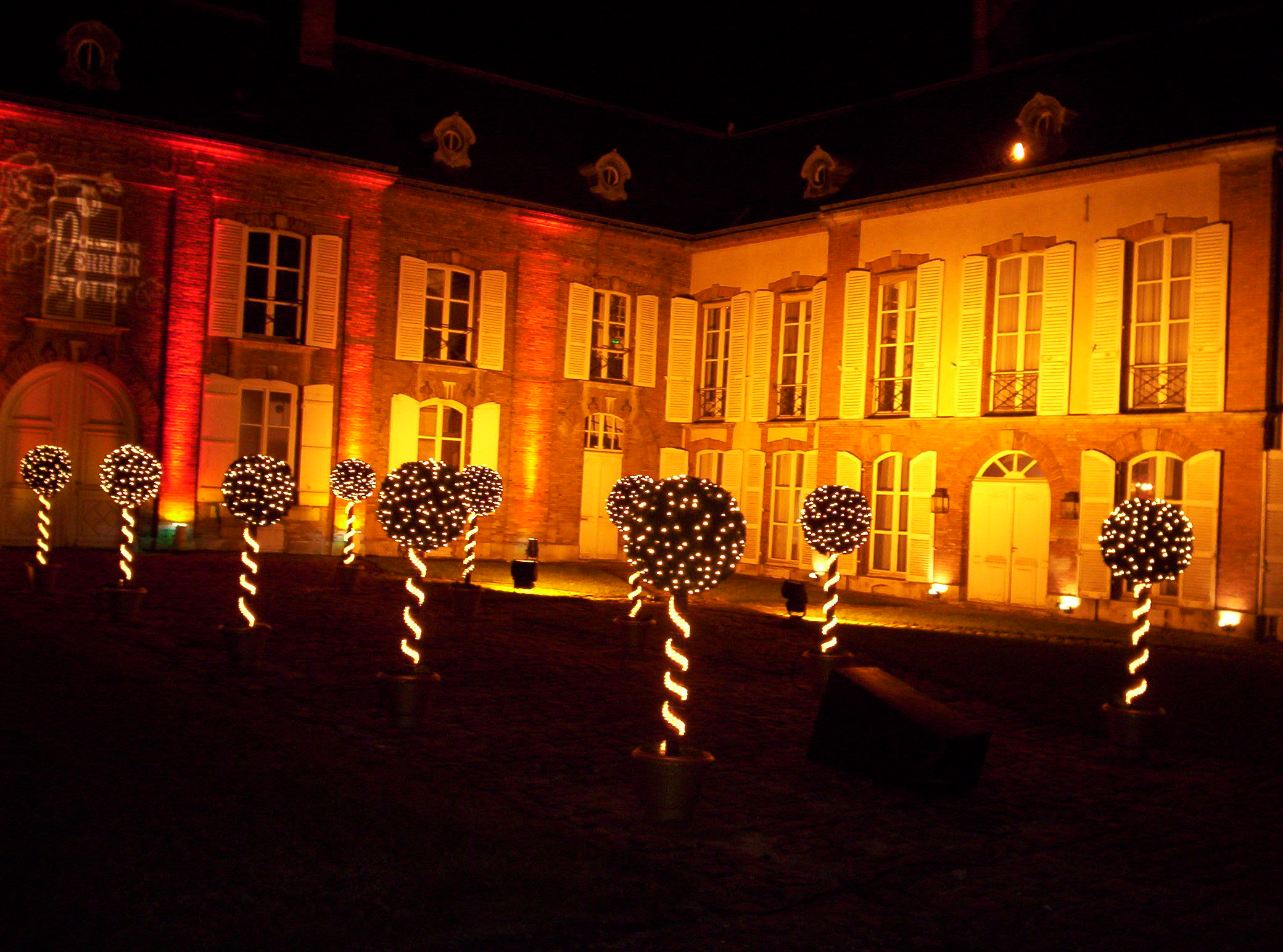
De Venoge .
