= Lanson-BCC =

French group of Champagne companies

- Traded as: Euronext Growth
- Industry: holding company activities
- Founded: 22 December 1992
- Headquarters: Reims, France

Lanson-BCC is an organization resulting from the merger in 2006 between Lanson International and the Boizel Chanoine Champagne Group (BCC). As it exclusively comprises champagne houses, its motto is "Le groupe 100% Champagne" (the group with 100% champagne). The different houses which are owned by Lanson-BCC are: Champagne Lanson, Champagne Besserat de Bellefon, Champagne Chanoine Frères, Champagne Boizel, Champagne Philiponnat, Champagne De Venoge.

== Lanson International ==
Lanson International is a former group of champagne houses, which included Lanson, Besserat de Bellefon. Prior to the addition of Lanson in 1990, it traded as Marne et Champagne. In 2006, Lanson International was bought by Boizel Chanoine Champagne Group (BCC), creating the Lanson-BCC group.
