= Julie Lin =

Scottish chef and restauranteur

- Born: Julie Swee-Lin MacLeod; September 1991 (age 34)
- Years active: 2014–present
- Culinary career
- Current restaurants: Julie's Kopitiam; GaGa
- Television shows: MasterChef; Julie and Jimmy's Hot Woks
- Website: www.julielin.co.uk

Julie Lin (born September 1991) is a Scottish chef, restaurateur, television personality and author. She began her career as a quarter-finalist in the ninth series of MasterChef (2014) on BBC One. She has since opened two restaurants, the second, GaGa, of which earned a Bib Gourmand. Her debut cookbook Sama Sama was published in 2025.

== Early life ==
Lin was born to a Scottish father and a Malaysian Chinese mother and grew up in Glasgow.

== Career ==
In 2014, Lin was a quarter-finalist in series 9 of the BBC One reality cooking competition MasterChef. In the following years, Lin trained with Laurie Macmillan at Café Strange Brew and became head chef of Rachna Dheer's Babu Bombay Street Kitchen. In 2016, Lin co-hosted the STV series Julie and Jimmy's Hot Woks with fellow Glasgow chef Jimmy Lee.

After a successful first pop-up, at the end of 2017 and start of 2018, Lin opened her first restaurant, Julie's Kopitiam, on Pollokshaws Road in Shawlands, south side Glasgow. She opened her second restaurant, GaGa, in Partick on Dumbarton Road in 2021. Shortly after featuring in an episode of The Hairy Bikers Go Local on BBC Two, Julie's Kopitiam closed in 2023. That year, Lin began making recurring appearances on the BBC One programme Saturday Kitchen.

Announced in 2024, Ebury Press acquired the rights to publish Lin's debut cookbook Sama Sama: Comfort Food from My Mixed Malaysian Kitchen in May 2025. In summer 2025, Lin stepped down from her position as head chef and director of GaGa.

== Personal life ==
Lin moved to London in 2024.

== Bibliography ==
- Sama Sama: Comfort Food from My Mixed Malaysian Kitchen (2025)

== Accolades ==
In 2022, Lin was a finalist for Ayala SquareMeal Female Chef of the Year. In 2023, she was named One to Watch by Great British Chefs.

Lin won Food Influencer of the Year at the 2024 Golden Chopsticks Awards. After inspection in November 2024, GaGa was awarded the Michelin Bib Gourmand in February 2025.
