= Paul Goerg =

Coordinates: 48.9067721°N 4.0031116°E

Paul Goerg is a Champagne producer based in the Vertus region of Champagne. The co-operative, founded in 1950, produces both vintage and non-vintage cuvee as well as a blanc de blancs Chardonnay Champagne.

== See also ==
- List of Champagne houses
