= Pierre Moncuit =

Champagne house in Mesnil-sur-Oger

Pierre Moncuit is a Champagne house founded in Mesnil-sur-Oger in 1889. The vineyards are Grand Cru status. Since 1977, Nicole and Yves Moncuit, sister and brother, have managed the estate. Pierre Moncuit wines are produced from a single vintage, and no reserve wines are blended into the non-vintage offerings.
