= List of champagne houses =

A negociant Champagne from Montaudon

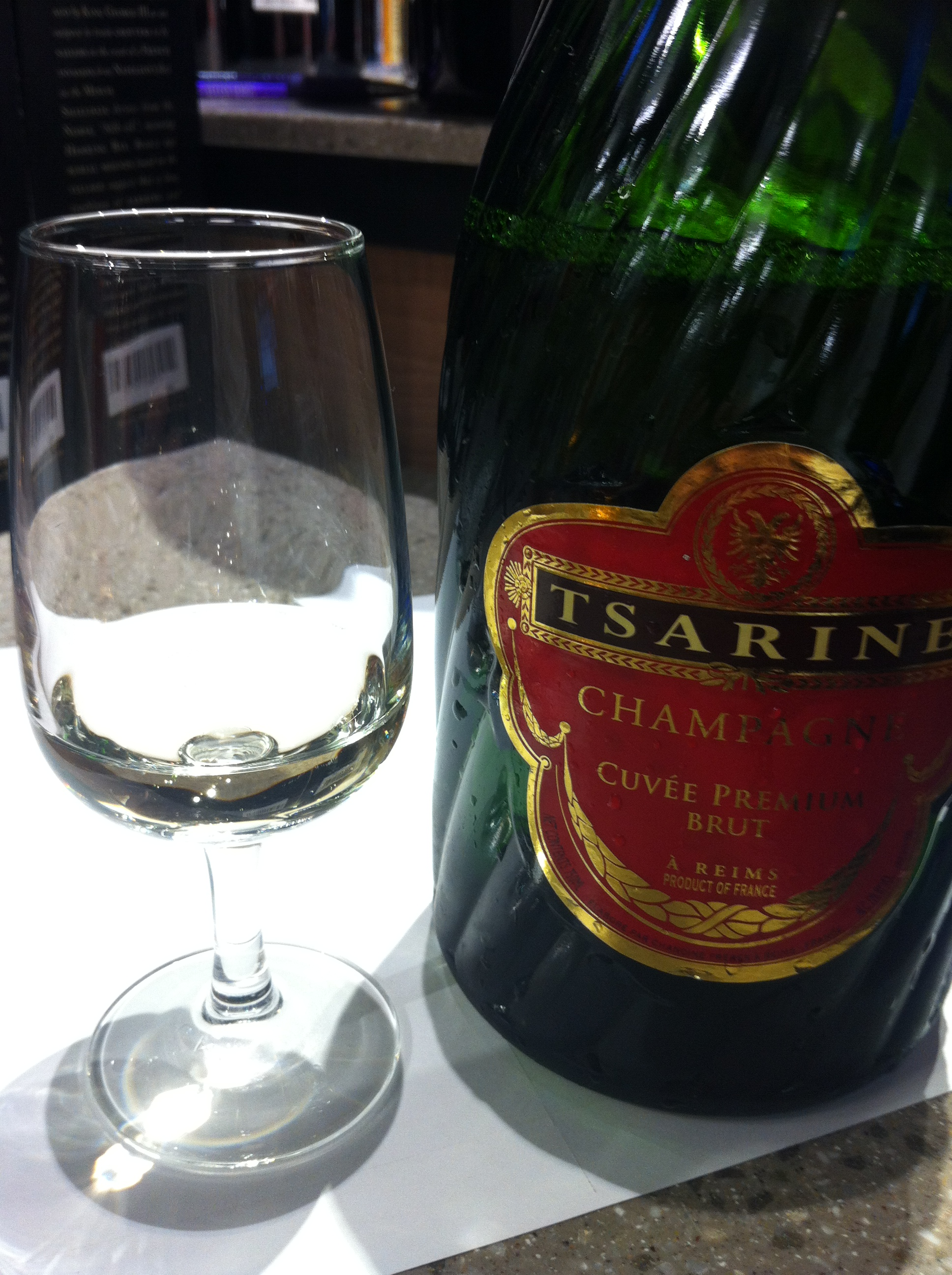
Tsarine, a second label of Chanoine Frères

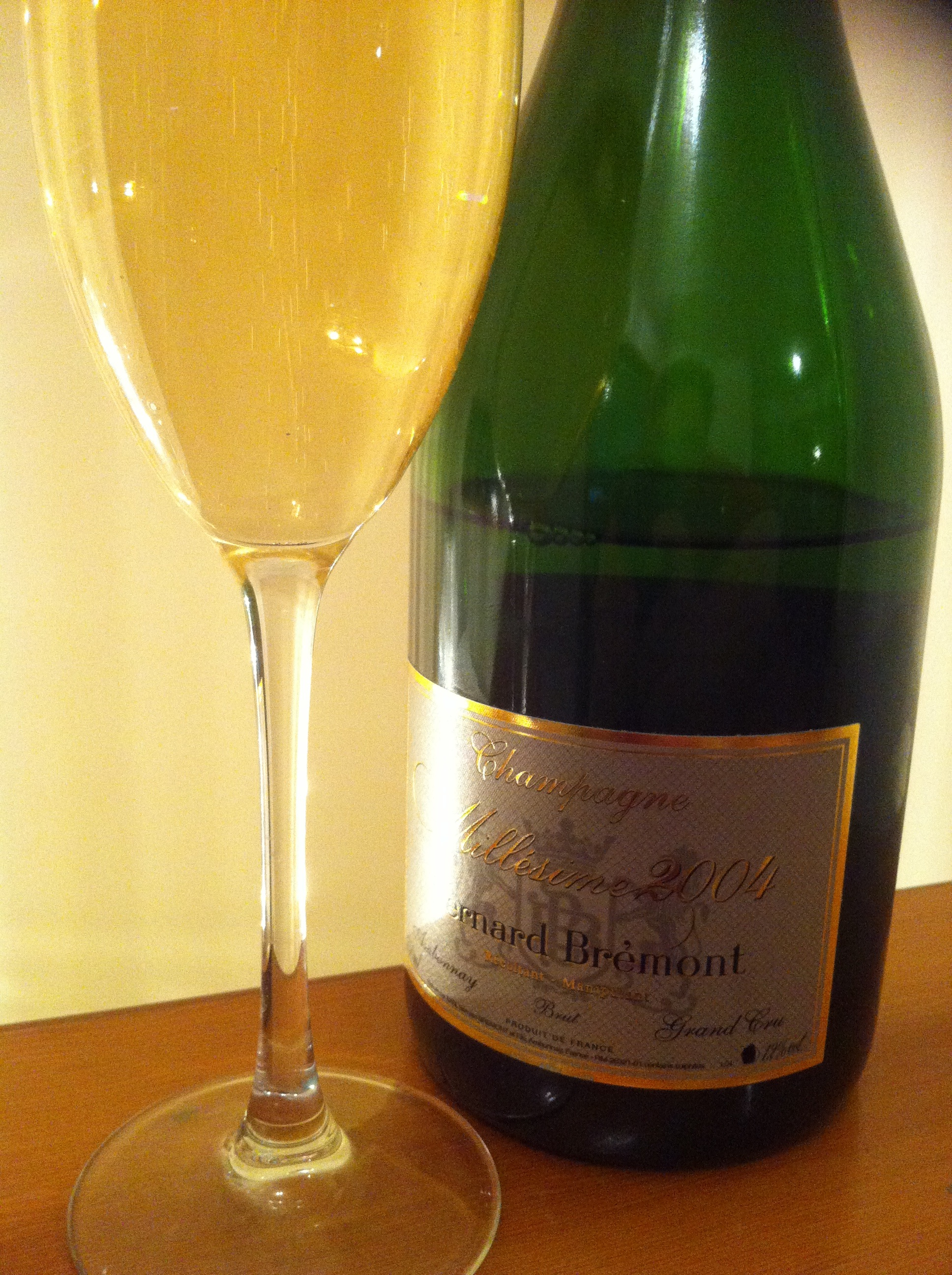
A Grand Cru grower Champagne from Bernard Bremont

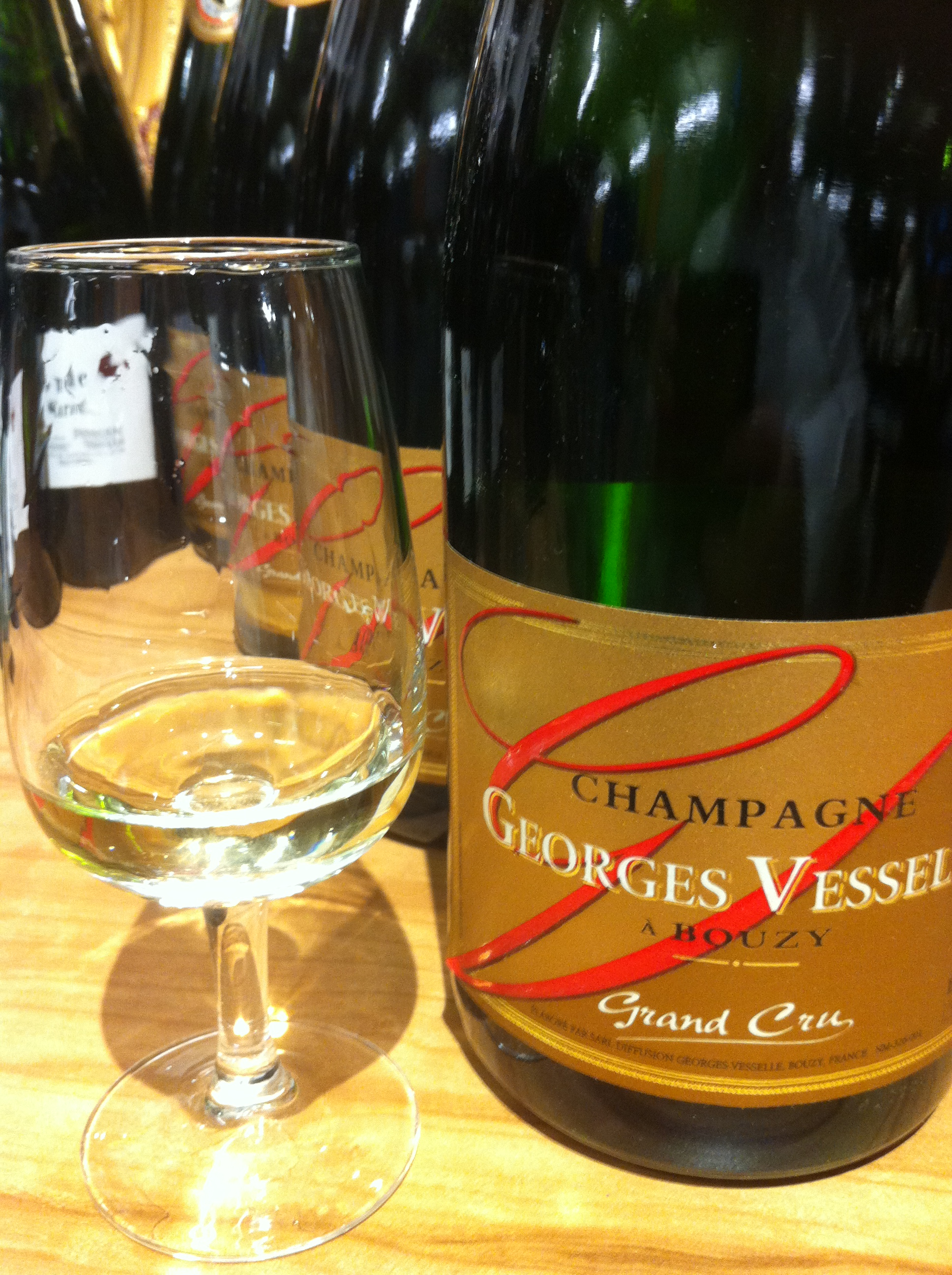
A Grand Cru Champagne from Georges Vesselle

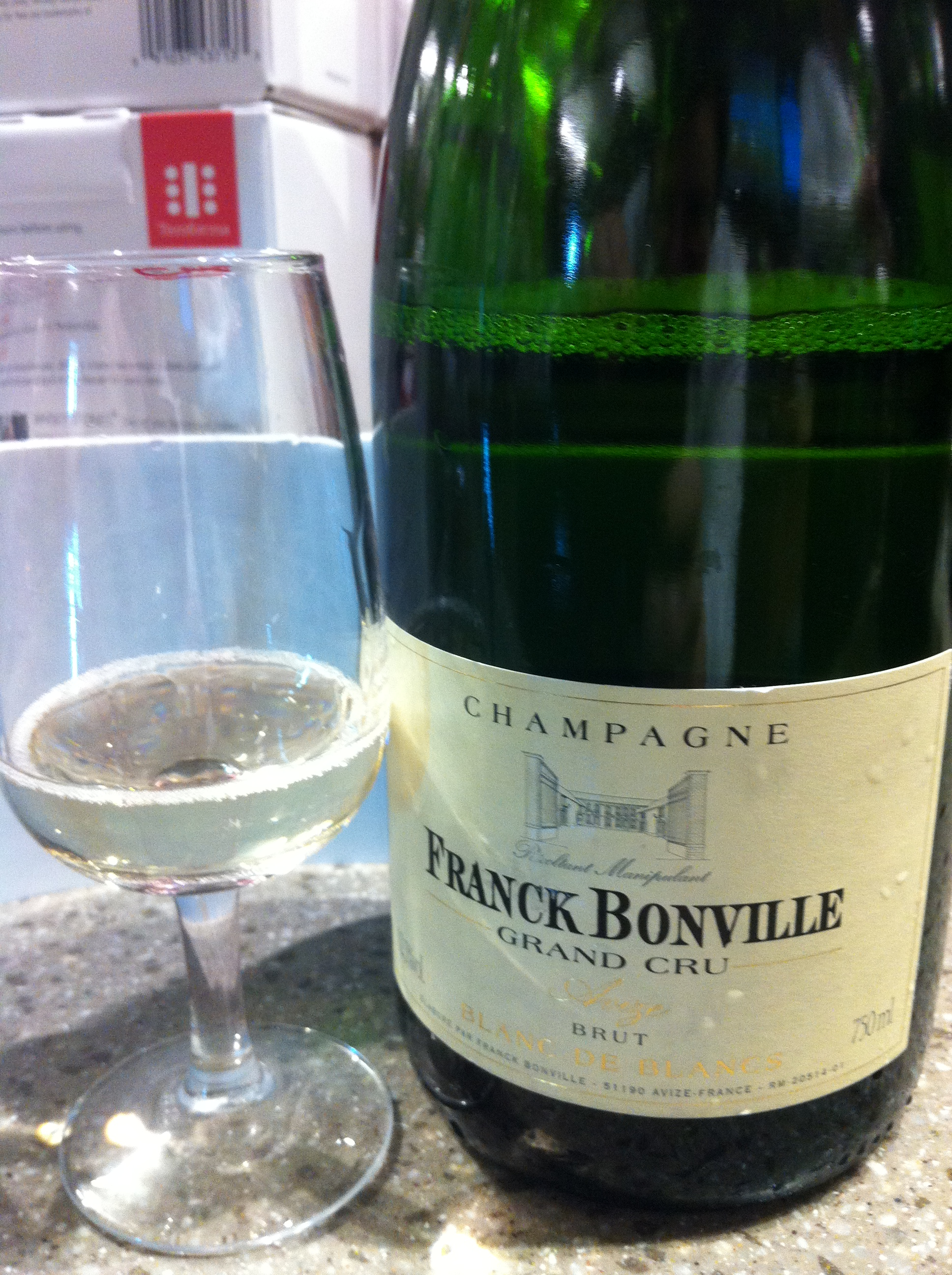
A blanc de blanc Grand Cru Champagne from Franck Bonville

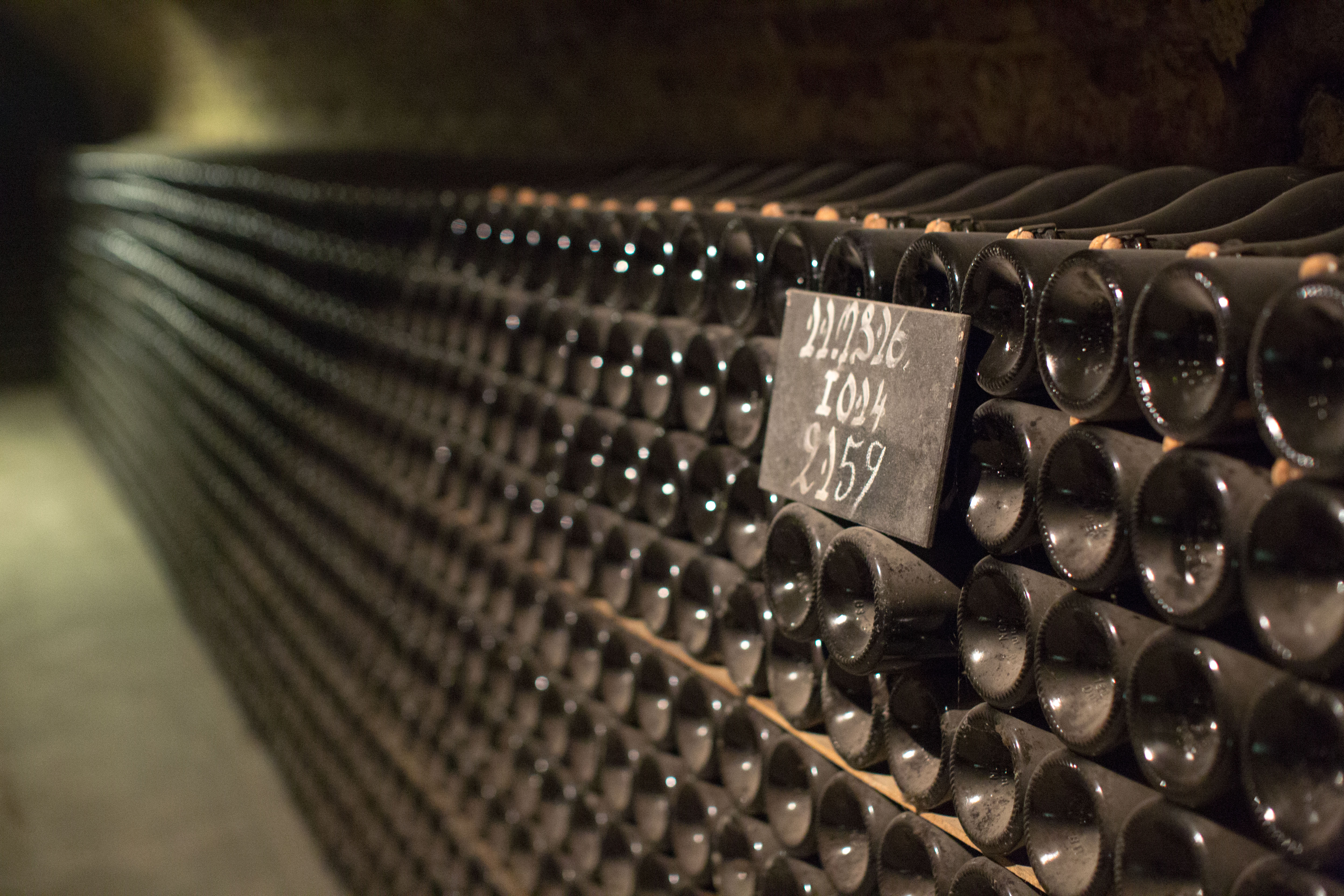
Bottles of Moët & Chandon in the caves

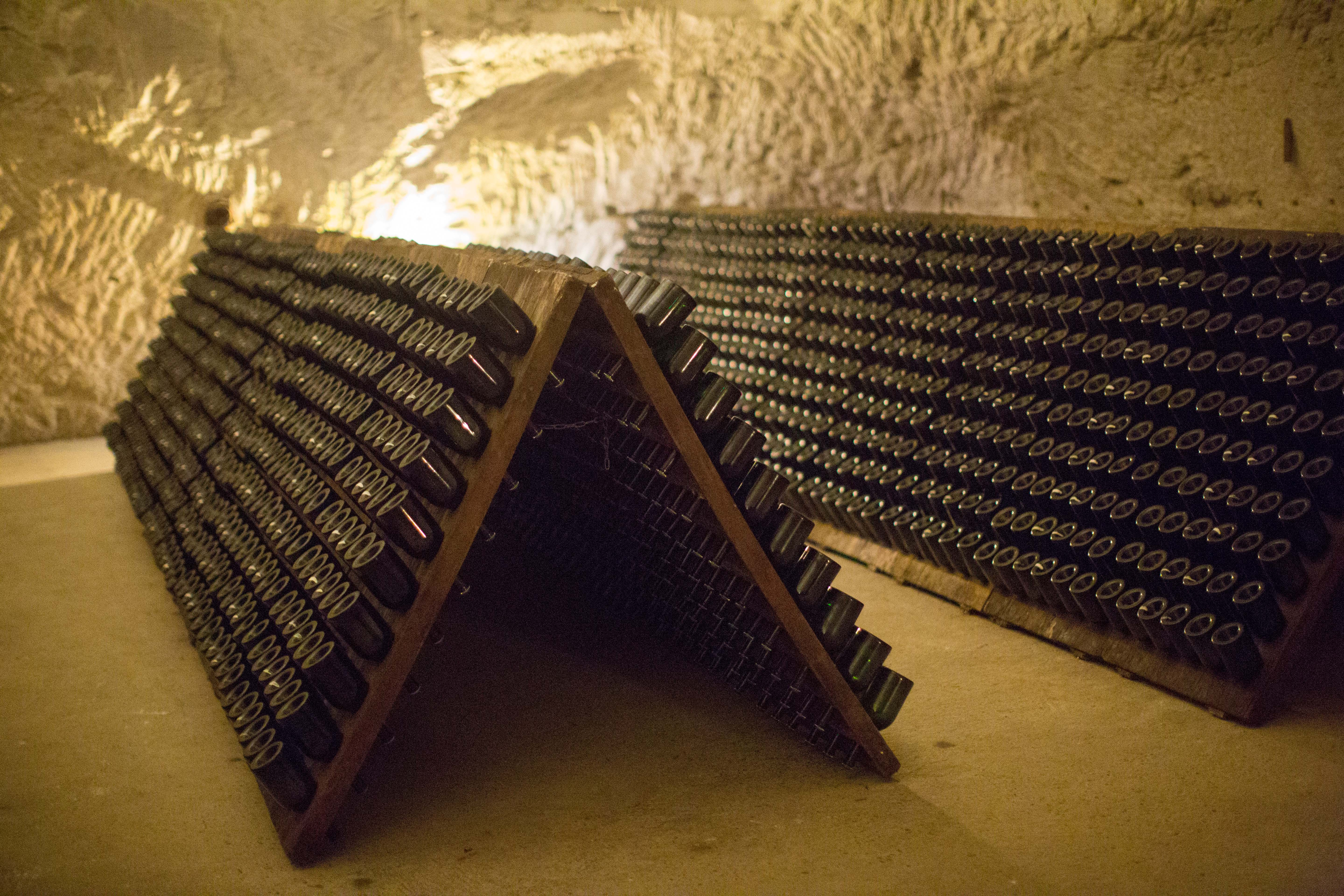
Bottles of Taittinger in the cave

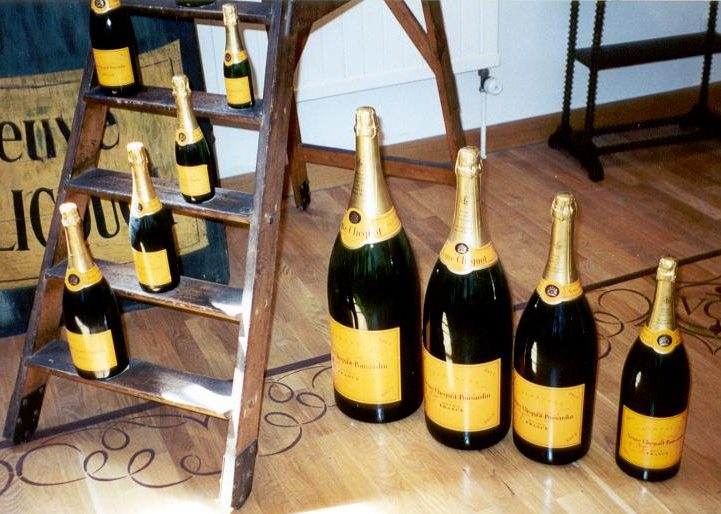
Bottles of Veuve Clicquot ranging from "piccolo" (0.188 L) to "Balthazar" (12 L)

The listing below comprises some of the more prominent houses of champagne. Most of the major houses are members of the organisation Union de Maisons de Champagne (UMC), and are sometimes referred to as Grandes Marques.

== Champagne houses ==
House	Founded	Location	Cuvée	Owner
Abelé	1757	Reims	Sourire de Reims	Terroirs & Vignerons de Champagne (TEVC)
Ayala	1860	Aÿ	Grande Cuvée (Vintage)	Groupe Bollinger
Billecart-Salmon	1818	Mareuil-sur-Aÿ	Brut Réserve; Clos St Hilare	Independent
Binet	1849	Reims	Brut Elite; Elite Rosé (Rosé de saignée); Elite Blanc de Noirs; Médaillon Rouge (Vintage)	Independent
Boizel	1834	Épernay	Joyau de France (Vintage)	Lanson-BCC
Boll & Cie	1853	Reims	Grand cru blanc de blancs (Vintage)	Independent
Bollinger	1829	Aÿ	Vieilles Vignes Françaises (Vintage); R.D. (Récemment Dégorgé) (Vintage)	Groupe Bollinger
Bruno Paillard	1981	Reims	Nec Plus Ultra (Vintage) brut première cuvée (Vintage)	Independent
Burtin - Besserat de Bellefon	1843	Épernay	Cuvée des Moines	Lanson-BCC
Canard-Duchêne	1868	Ludes	Grande Cuvée Charles VII	Groupe Thiénot
Cattier	1918	Chigny-les-Roses	Clos du Moulin	Independent
Chanoine Frères	1730	Reims	Gamme Tsarine	Lanson-BCC
Charles Heidsieck	1851	Reims	Blanc des Millénaires (Vintage)	Societé Européenne de Participations Industrielles (EPI)
De Castellane	1895	Épernay	Commodore (Vintage)	Laurent Perrier
De Cazanove	1811	Reims	Stradivarius	Groupe Rapeneau
De Venoge	1837	Épernay	Grand Vin des Princes (Vintage)	Lanson-BCC
Delamotte	1760	Le Mesnil-sur-Oger		Laurent-Perrier
Deutz	1838	Aÿ	Amour de Deutz (Vintage)	Louis Roederer Group
Duval-Leroy	1859	Vertus	Femme de Champagne (above average years only); Fleur de Champagne (above average years only)	Family-owned
Gosset	1584	Épernay	Celebris (Vintage); Grand Millésime (Vintage)	Renaud-Cointreau
Alfred Gratien	1864	Épernay	Cuvée Paradis	Henkell Freixenet
Heidsieck & Co Monopole	1785	Épernay	Diamant Bleu (Vintage)	Vranken-Pommery Monopole
Henriot	1808	Reims	Cuvée des Enchanteleurs (Vintage); Brut Souverain	TEVC
Jacquesson	1798	Dizy	Avize Grand Cru (Vintage)	Artemis Domaines
Krug	1843	Reims	Krug (Vintage); Clos du Mesnil (above average years only)	LVMH
Lanson	1760	Reims	Noble Cuvée (Vintage)	Lanson-BCC
Laurent-Perrier	1812	Tours-sur-Marne	Grand Siècle	Laurent Perrier
Mercier	1858	Épernay	Vendange (Vintage)	LVMH
Moët & Chandon	1743	Épernay	Dom Pérignon (Vintage)	LVMH
G. H. Mumm	1827	Reims	Mumm de Cramant	Pernod Ricard
Pannier	1899	Château-Thierry		Covama
Perrier-Jouët	1811	Épernay	Belle Époque (Vintage)	Pernod Ricard
Francis Pétret	1960	Chouilly		
Piper-Heidsieck	1785	Reims	Rare	EPI
Pol Roger	1849	Épernay	Sir Winston Churchill (Vintage)	Independent
Pommery	1836	Reims	Cuvée Louise (Vintage)	Vranken-Pommery Monopole
Louis Roederer	1776	Reims	Cristal (Vintage)	Louis Roederer Group
Ruinart	1729	Reims	Dom Ruinart (Vintage); Ruinart blanc de blancs (Vintage)	LVMH
Salon	1921	Le Mesnil-sur-Oger	Champagne Salon (Vintage)	Laurent-Perrier
Taittinger	1734	Reims	Comtes de Champagne (Vintage)	Taittinger
Thiénot	1985	Reims	Cuvée Alain Thiénot (Vintage); Cuvée Stanislas (Vintage); Cuvée Garance (Vintage); La vigne aux Gamins (Vintage)	Groupe Thiénot
Veuve Clicquot Ponsardin	1772	Reims	La Grande Dame (Vintage); Carte jaune (Vintage); Clicquot Rich Reserve (Vintage)	LVMH

Other major houses or brands, not members of UMC
House	Year of foundation	Place of origin	Cuvée de prestige (Premium label) Vintage where indicated	Parent group
Delbeck	1832	Reims		
Drappier	1808	Urville	Grande Sendrée (Vintage)	Family-owned
Gauthier	1858	Épernay	Grande Réserve Brut	Lanson-BCC
Nicolas Feuillatte	1972	Chouilly	Palmes d'Or	TEVC
Selosse	1960	Avize		Independent
Paul Goerg	1950	Vertus	Cuvée Lady C. (Vintage)	
Vilmart	1872	Rilly-la-Montagne	Coeur de Cuvée (Vintage)	Independent

== See also ==
- History of champagne
- Champagne production
- Grower champagne
