= Boll & Cie =

Champagne manufacturer

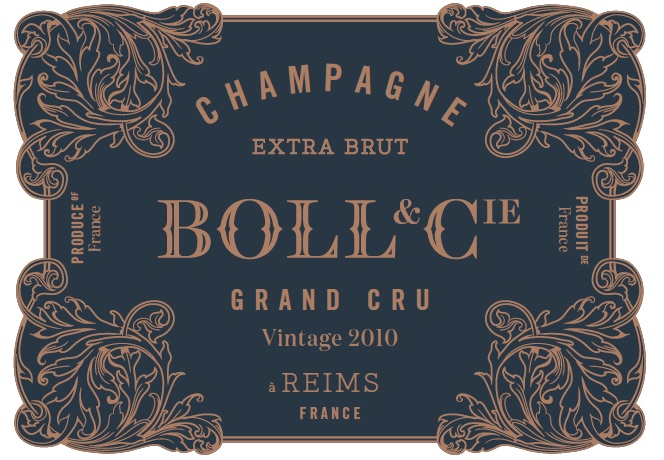
- Boll & Cie Grand Cru Label
- Location: Reims
- Wine region: Champagne
- Founded: 1853
- Known for: Brut champagne
- Website: www.boll-cie.com

Boll & Cie is a Champagne house based in Reims, a producer of sparkling wines from the Champagne region of France, founded in 1853. With the exception of the Brut Rose, all Champagnes from Boll & Cie are blanc de blancs. Boll & Cie specializes in Brut Champagne, including a Grand Cru from the village of Le Mesnil-sur-Oger.

Boll & Cie also produces a vintage Ratafia, the sweet fortified wine from the Champagne Region. Boll & Cie produces mostly blanc de blanc Champagnes, wines made entirely from the Chardonnay grape. The selected wineyards from Boll & Cie are in Oger, Le Mesnil sur Oger, Vindey and Montgueux.

== History ==
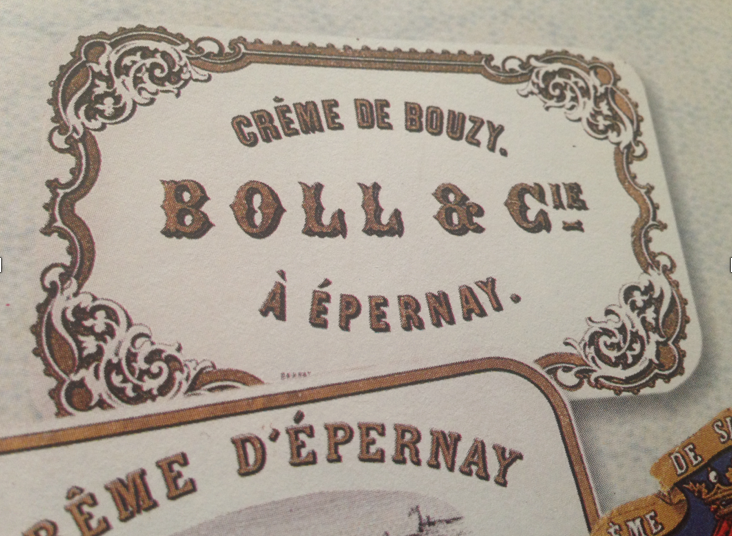
Boll & Cie Original Label from 1881

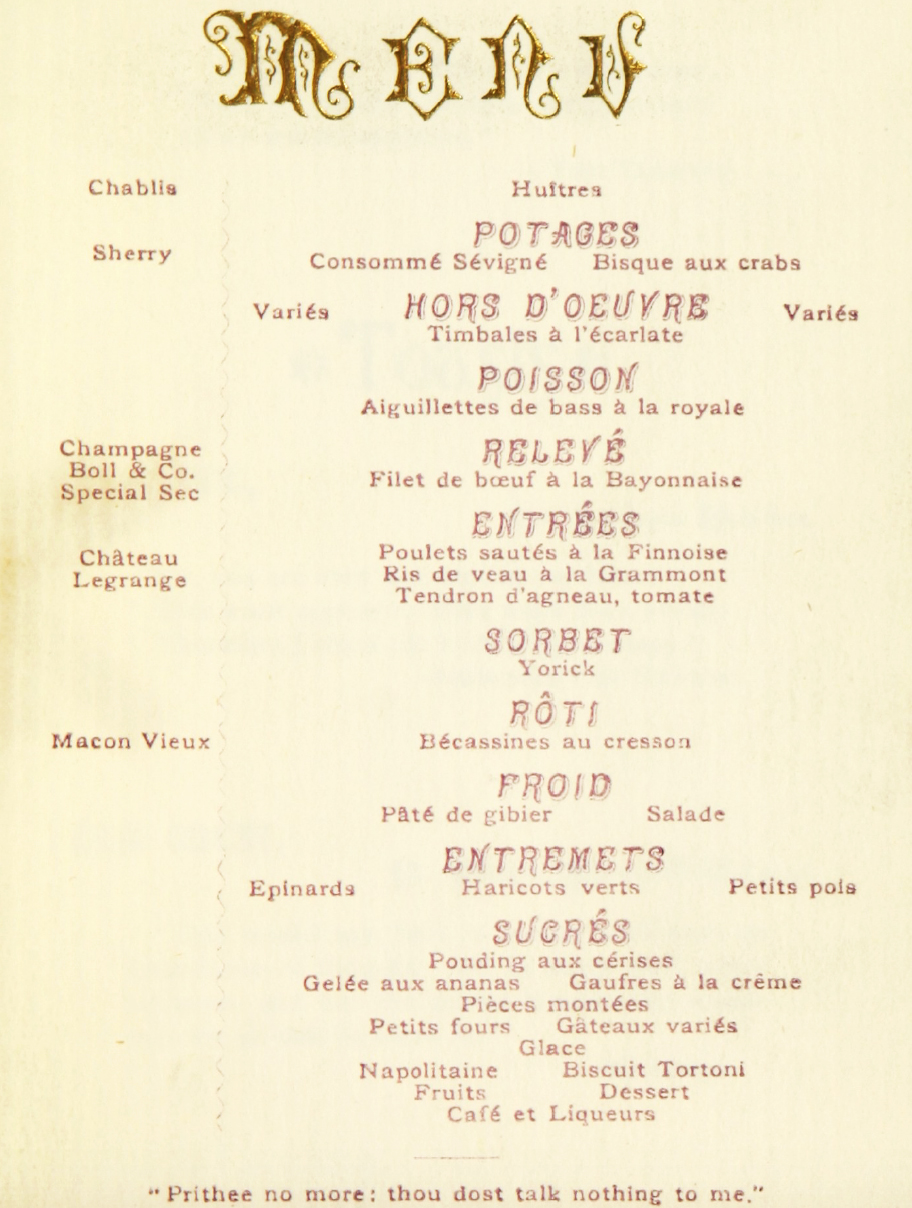
Menu from 12 April 1883, Delmonico's Restaurant

Boll & Cie was established in 1853. Wines which were sold within Europe and the USA, supplying major wine merchants such as Harrods in London.

Headquartered in the city of Reims it became a member of the Syndicat du Commerce des vins de Champagne, which later became the Unions des Maisons de Champagne in 1882.

Boll & Cie Champagne was served in the restaurants in the USA, United Kingdom and France in the 19th century such as Delmonico's New York.

Besides Blanc de Blanc Extra Brut and the Boll & Cie Grand Cru Vintage 2010, Boll produces Rose Champagne as well as Ratafia.

The distribution of Boll Champagne is limited to selected distributors and restaurants, mainly in France, Germany, UK, Japan, Australia, Hong-Kong and Taiwan.

In March 2017, Boll & Cie was the official champagne for Pagani Automobili at the Geneva Motor Show. Château de Méry, the estate of Boll & Cie is currently redeveloped as a luxurious hideaway, will open its doors to the public in 2018.
