= Champagne Lanson =

Champagne producer in Reims, France

Coordinates: 49.243068°N 4.0180672°E

Champagne Lanson is a Champagne producer that is based in Reims in the Champagne region. Since 2006, it has been owned by the Lanson-BCC group that is headed by Bruno Paillard (who also owns the Bruno Paillard champagne house).

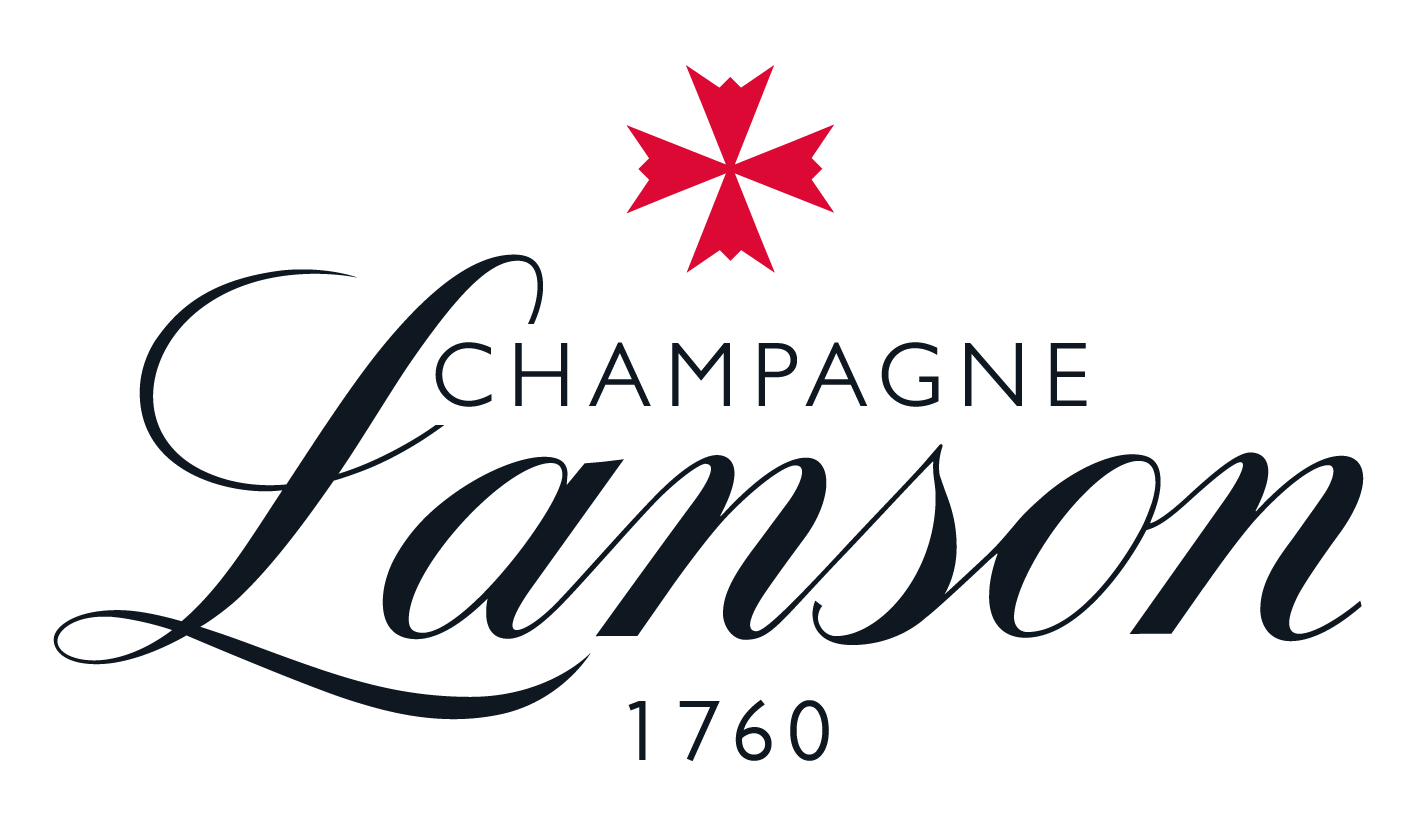
Logo Champagne Lanson

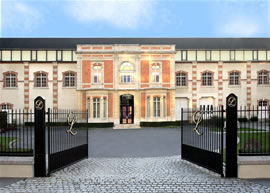
Lanson headquarters in Reims

== History ==
Lanson was founded in 1760 by a magistrate, François Delamotte. He was succeeded by his son Nicholas-Louis in 1798 and formed a partnership with Jean-Baptiste Lanson, who gave the company the name of Lanson et Cie in 1837. The company focused, as it still does today, on exporting champagne to foreign markets.

By the late 19th century, Lanson was supplying champagne by royal appointment to the courts of the United Kingdom, Sweden and Spain. Lanson remains a purveyor of champagne to the British royal family and retains the Royal warrant of appointment (United Kingdom) which currently depicts the coat of arms of Elizabeth II on its bottles.

The champagne house remained family owned until 1980, when it was sold by Etitenne and Pierre Lanson to the Gardinier Group. It changed hands several times until 1994, when it was purchased by Marne et Champagne (which renamed itself Lanson International).

In 1996, Lanson International was purchased by the Boizel-Chanoine Group (BCC). Lanson and Besserat de Bellefon became part of this group, which also includes Phillipponnat, de Venoge, Chanoine, Boizel and Alexandre Bonnet. The Boizel-Chanoine Group also make "private label" champagne for several UK supermarkets and independent retailers. In 2006, the Lanson-BCC group was created.

In 2008, a major repackaging exercise took place. The new packaging is reminiscent of the Lanson House Style of the 1980s.

== Range of wines ==
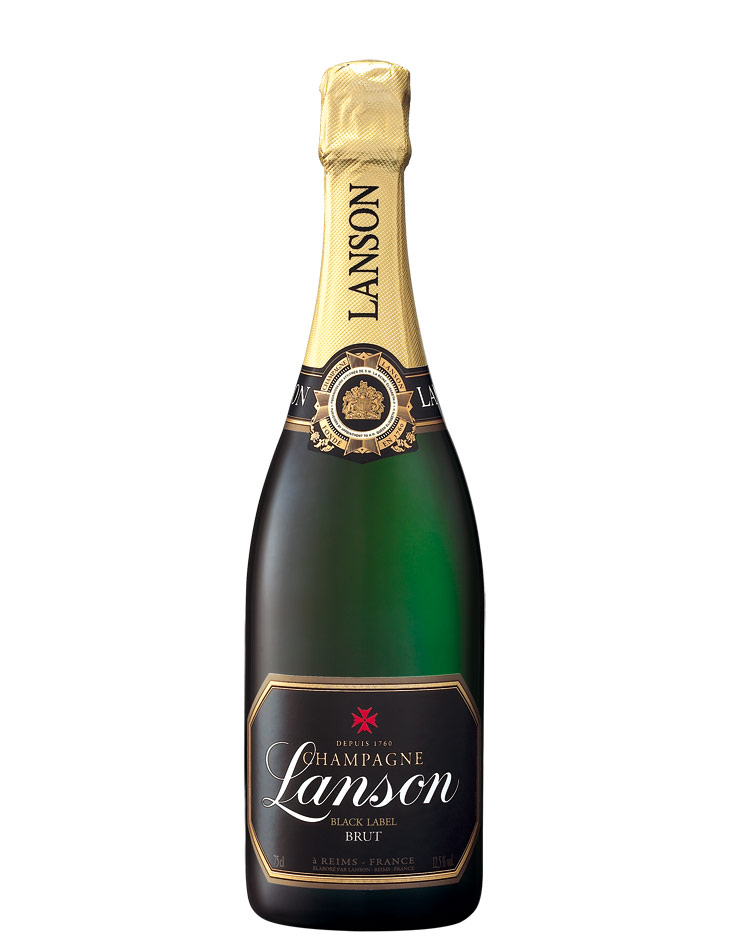
A bottle of Lanson Black Label

Core Range

- Le Black Label Brut: 50% Pinot Noir, 35% Chardonnay and 15% Pinot Meunier
- Le Rosé: 53% Pinot Noir, 32% Chardonnay and 15% Pinot Meunier
- Le White Label Sec: 50% Pinot Noir, 35% Chardonnay and 15% Pinot Meunier
- Le Blanc de Blancs: 100% Chardonnay
- Le Black Réserve: 50% Pinot Noir, 35% Chardonnay, 15% Pinot Meunier

Rare and exceptional

- Le Green Label Organic: 50% Pinot Noir, 20% Chardonnay, 30% Pinot Meunier
- Le Clos Lanson: 100% Chardonnay
- Le Vintage 2009: 52% Pinot Noir, 48% Chardonnay
- Le Vintage 2023: 53% Pinot Noir, 47% Chardonnay

Prestige cuvées

- La Noble Cuvée Brut 2002: 70% Chardonnay, 30% Pinot Noir
- La Noble Cuvée Blanc de Blancs 2002: 100% Chardonnay

== See also ==
- Champagne Besserat de Bellefon
- List of Champagne houses
