= Champagne Boizel =

Champagne producer

Coordinates: 49.0419255°N 3.963587°E

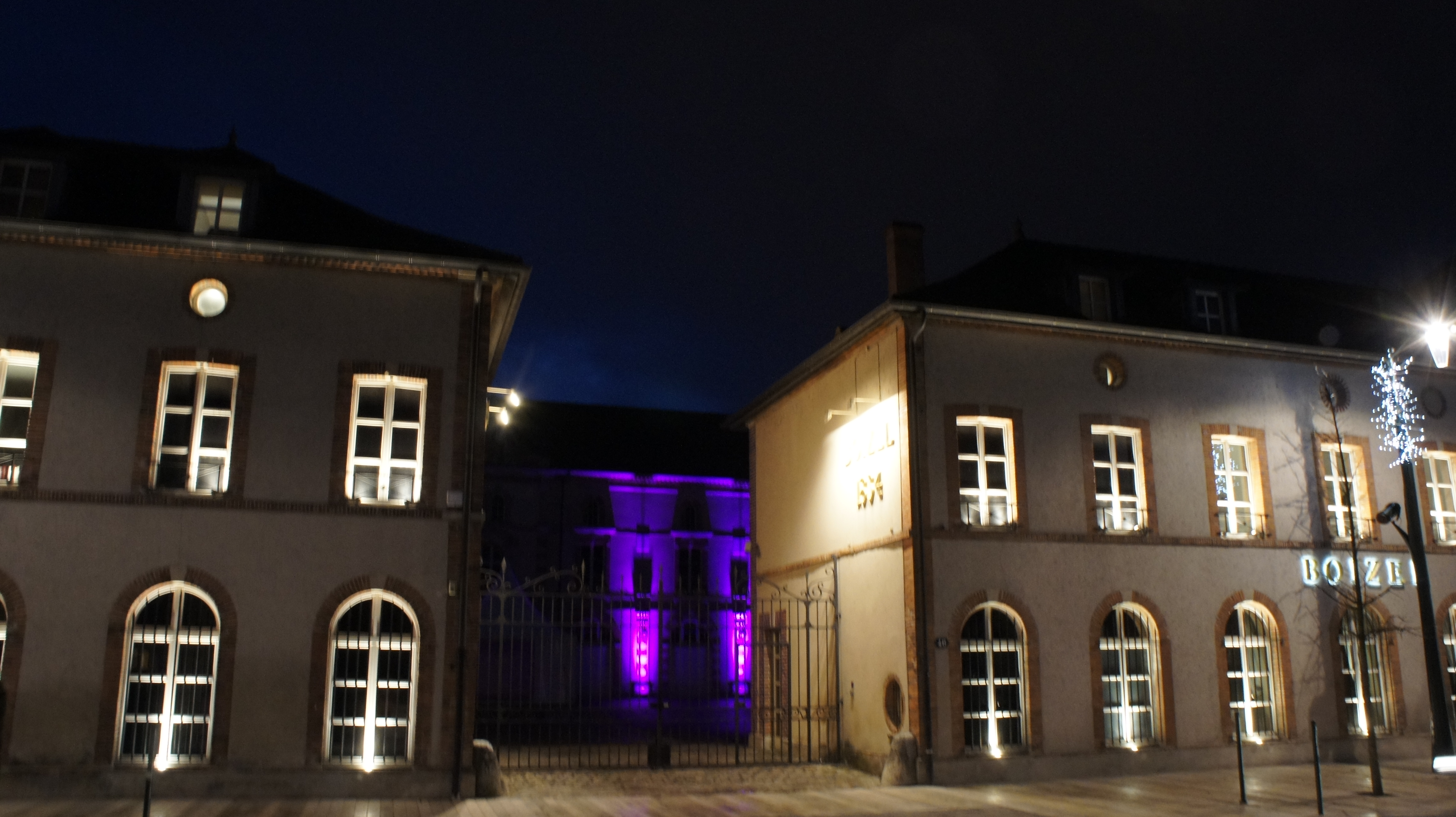
Boizel in Avenue de Champagne.

Champagne Boizel is a Champagne producer based in the Épernay region of Champagne. The house, founded in 1834, produces both vintage and non-vintage cuvee as well as a blanc de blancs Chardonnay Champagne and a rosé.

== See also ==
- List of Champagne houses
