= Champagne Chanoine Frères =

French Champagne producer

Coordinates: 49.21439°N 4.011531°E

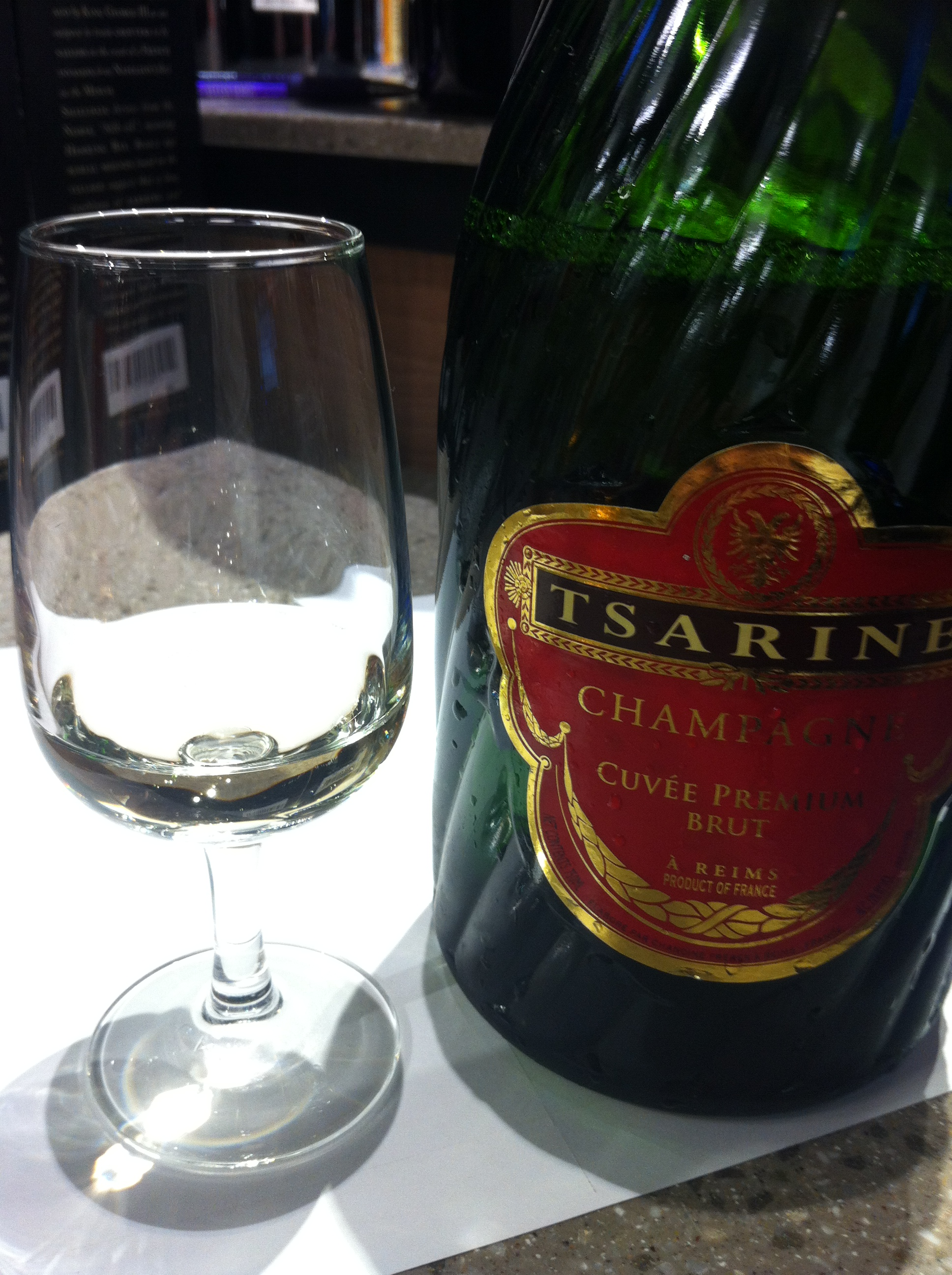
Tsarine Brut

Champagne Chanoine Frères is a Champagne producer based in the Reims region of Champagne. The house, founded in 1730, produces both vintage and non-vintage cuvee as well as an extra dry series of wines known as Tsarine and Tsarina.

== See also ==
- List of Champagne houses
