= Champagne Gauthier =

French winery

Champagne Gauthier is a Champagne house founded in 1858 in Épernay. Its Champagne is made as both vintage and non-vintage (NV) blend.

== See also ==
- History of Champagne
- Champagne production
- Grower Champagne
- List of Champagne houses
