= Ayala & Co. =

Winery

Coordinates: 49.1216043°N 3.9095022°E

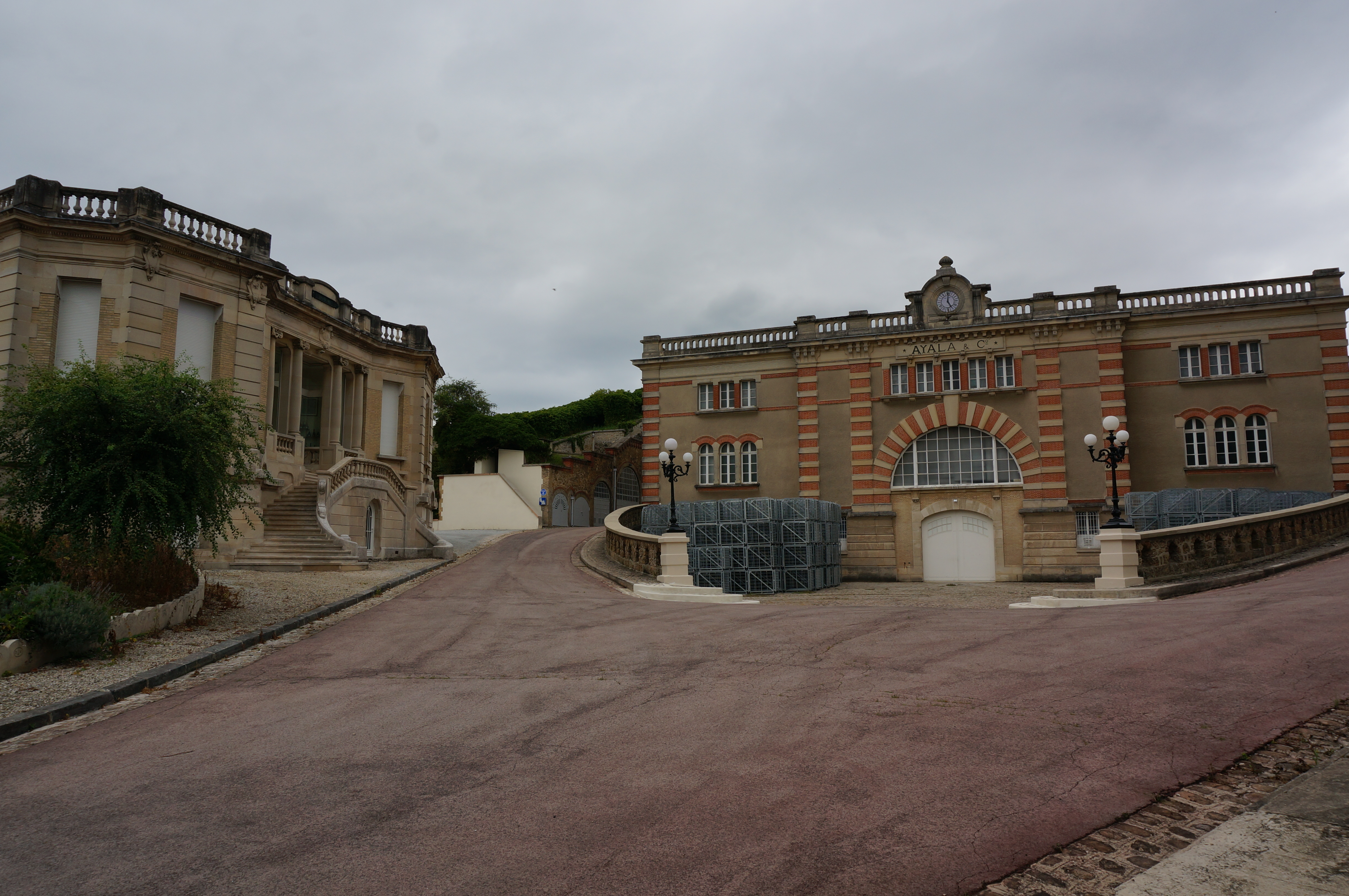
Ay cellar

Ayala & Co. is a champagne producer based in the Aÿ region of Champagne. The house, founded in 1860, produces both vintage and non-vintage cuvee. Ayala is managed by Hadrien Mouflard, former secretary general of Champagne Bollinger. The chef de cave is Julian Gout. The house was one of the founding members of the Syndicat des Grandes Marques in 1882.

== History ==
In 1855, Edmond de Ayala, the son of a Colombian diplomat, went to visit the Viscount of Mareuil in order to learn how to vinify wine. There he met Gabrielle d'Albrecht, the Viscount's niece. They married in 1858 and Gabrielle brought the Château d'Aÿ and magnificent vines as her dowry, and the house was founded in 1860.

== See also ==
- List of champagne houses
