= Bruno Paillard =

Champagne producer based in Reims

Coordinates: 49.214388°N 4.0129091°E

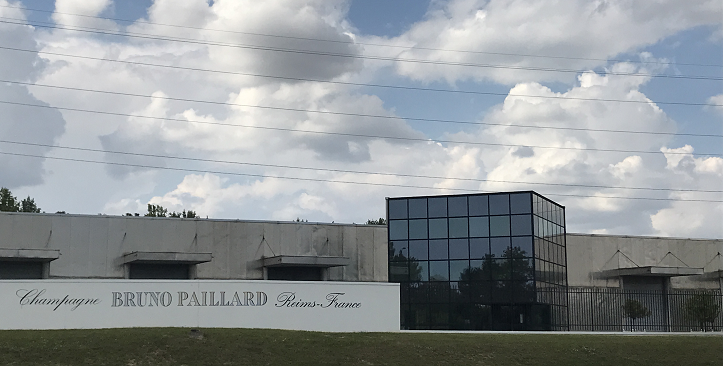

Bruno Paillard is a Champagne producer based in Reims in the Champagne region.

== History ==
The house was founded in 1981 by Bruno Paillard (born 1953), after he had worked as a broker in the region since 1975. The first own vineyards were bought in 1994, and the house's own 26 hectares (64 acres) supply around one-third of the grapes need for the annual production of around 500,000 bottles.

The house produces both vintage and non-vintage cuvées.

Bruno Paillard is one of the few entirely independent Champagne houses. Alice Paillard is the co-owner and director of the Bruno Paillard House and the champagne House was founded by her father.

== See also ==
- List of Champagne houses
