= Charles de Cazanove =

Coordinates: 49.2614425°N 4.028914°E

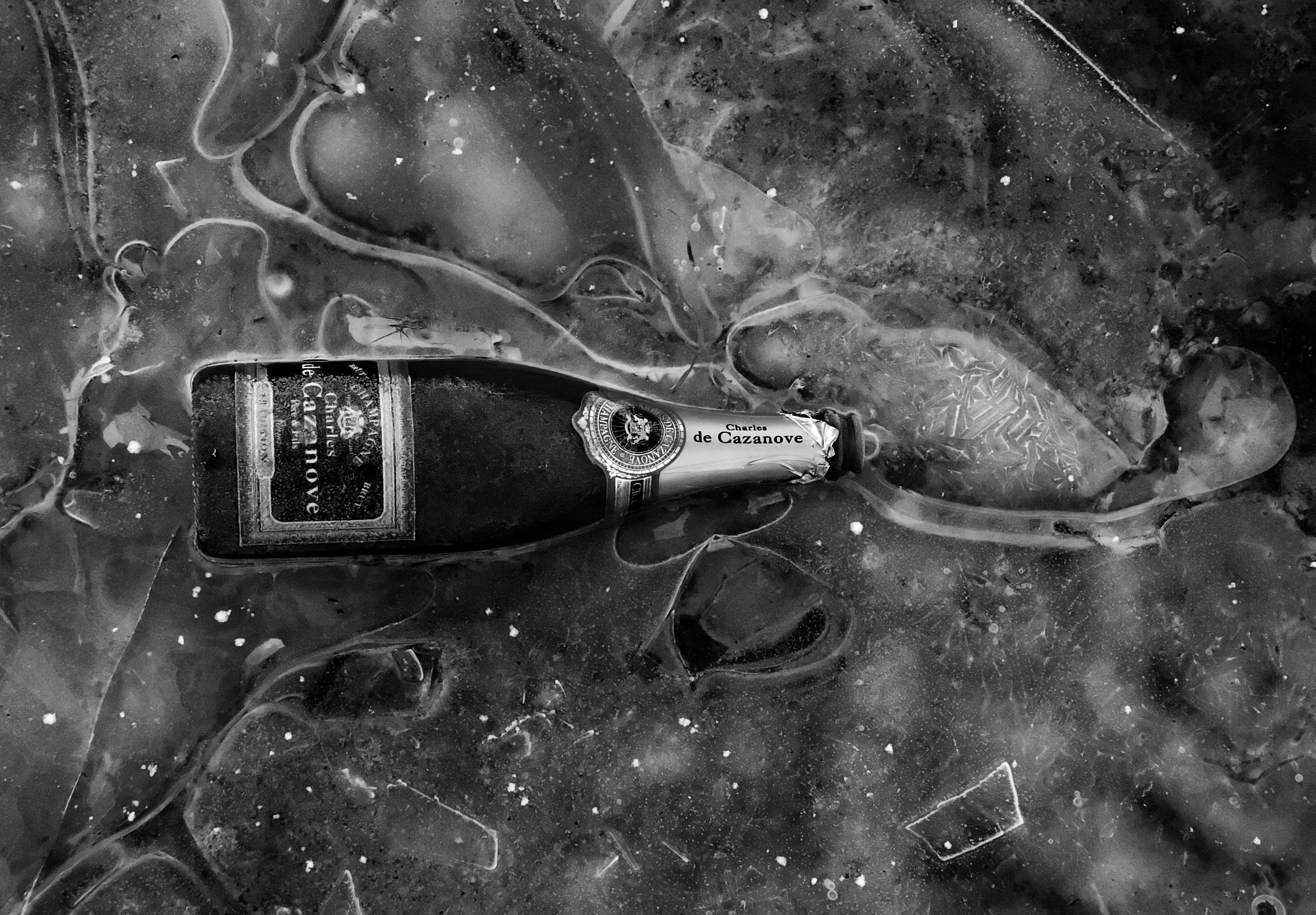
A bottle of Charles de Cazanove Champagne in an ice bath.

Charles de Cazanove is a Champagne producer based in Reims in the region of Champagne. The house was founded in Avize in 1811 by Charles Gabriel de Cazanove, and was further developed by his botanist son Charles Nicolas de Cazanove who was a leader in the efforts to fight phylloxera.

The house produces approximately 3,000,000 bottles annually.

== See also ==
- List of Champagne houses
