= Delbeck =

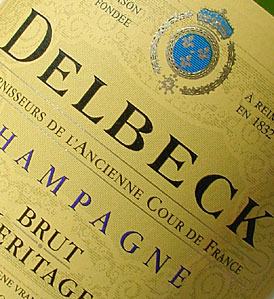

The Delbeck Champagne house was established in 1832 by Félix-Désiré Delbeck in Reims.

== History ==
Delbeck was a Flemish banker who invested in vineyards, and the husband of baronne Balsamie Ponsardin who was a niece of the Veuve Clicquot. Delbeck champagne found favour with the court of Louis-Philippe of France, and was in 1838 named the official Champagne of the French monarchy.

== See also ==
- List of Champagne houses
