= Abelé =

Coordinates: 49.2492728°N 4.045168°E

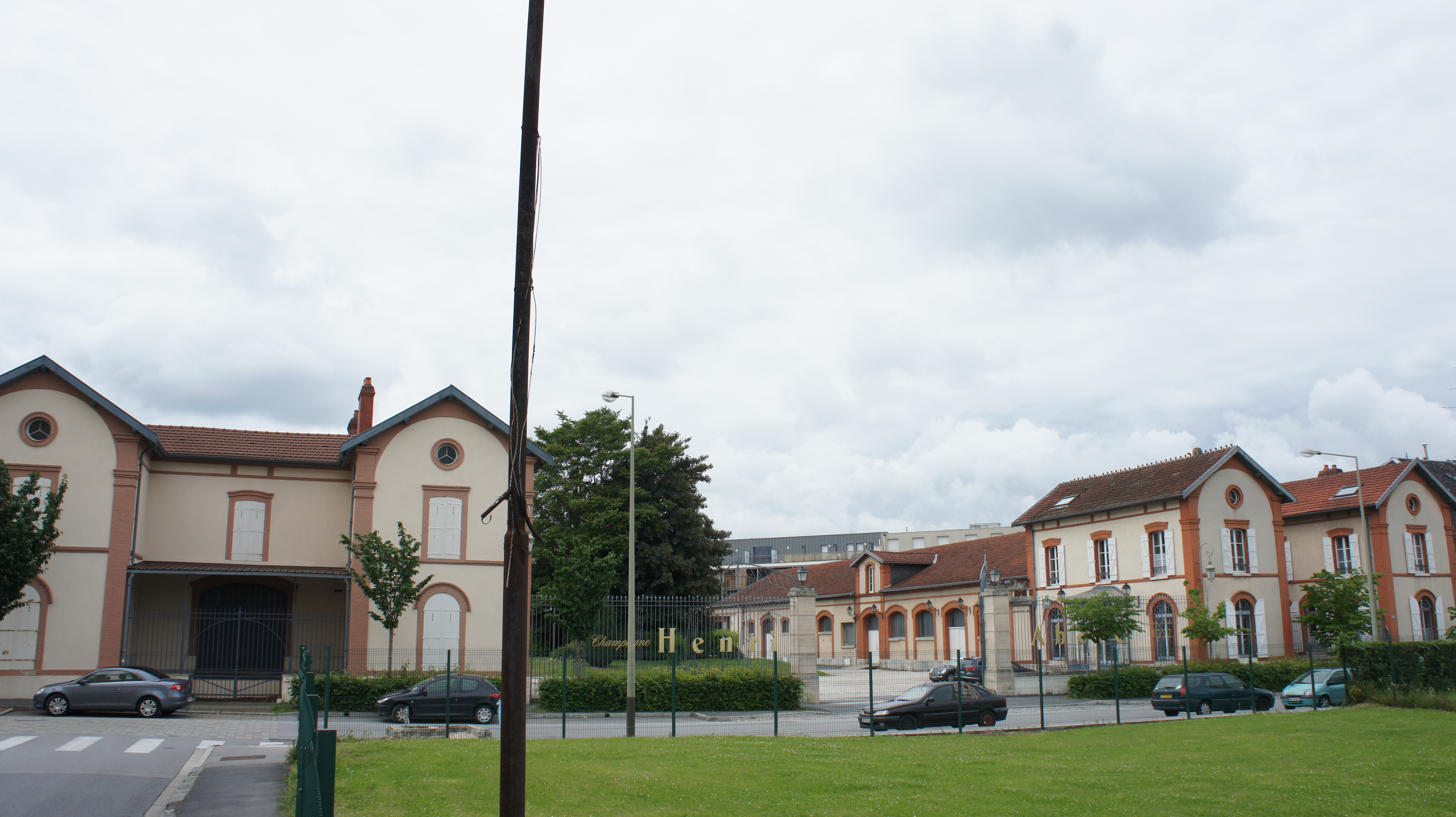
Champagne Abelé, Reims.

Abelé is a Champagne producer based in the Reims region of Champagne. The house was founded in 1757 by Téodore Vander-Veken as the third Champagne house in history.

The house produces approximately 400,000 bottles annually.

== See also ==
- List of Champagne houses
