= Champagne Binet =

French Champagne house

Champagne Binet is an independent champagne house.

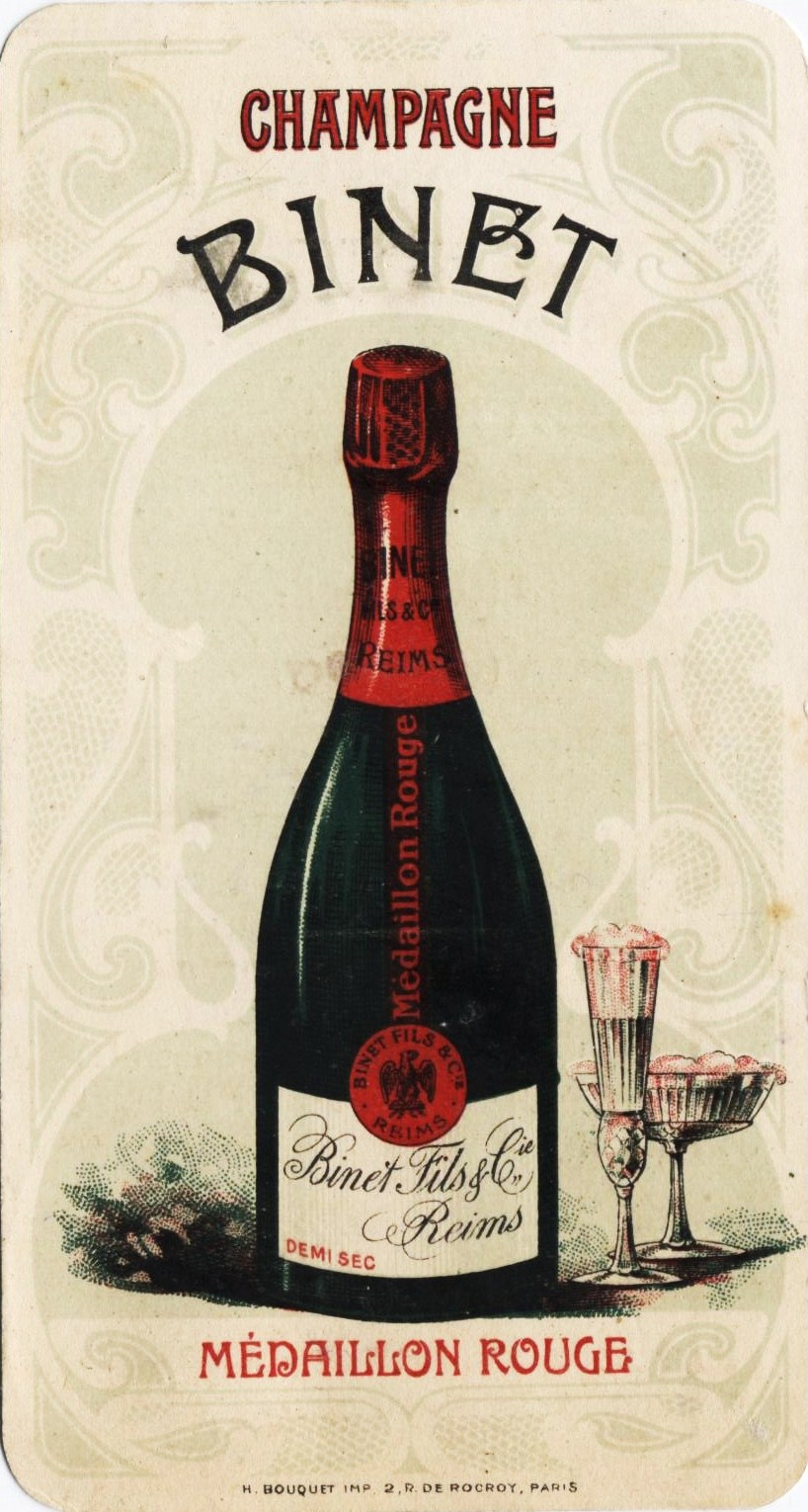

The house produces brut, blanc de blancs, and rosé de saignée champagne. Arnaud Vidal serves as its president. The champagne is made exclusively from grand cru grapes.

== See also ==
- History of champagne
- Champagne production
- Grower champagne
