= Francis Pétret =

Champagne house in Chouilly, France

Champagne Francis Pétret
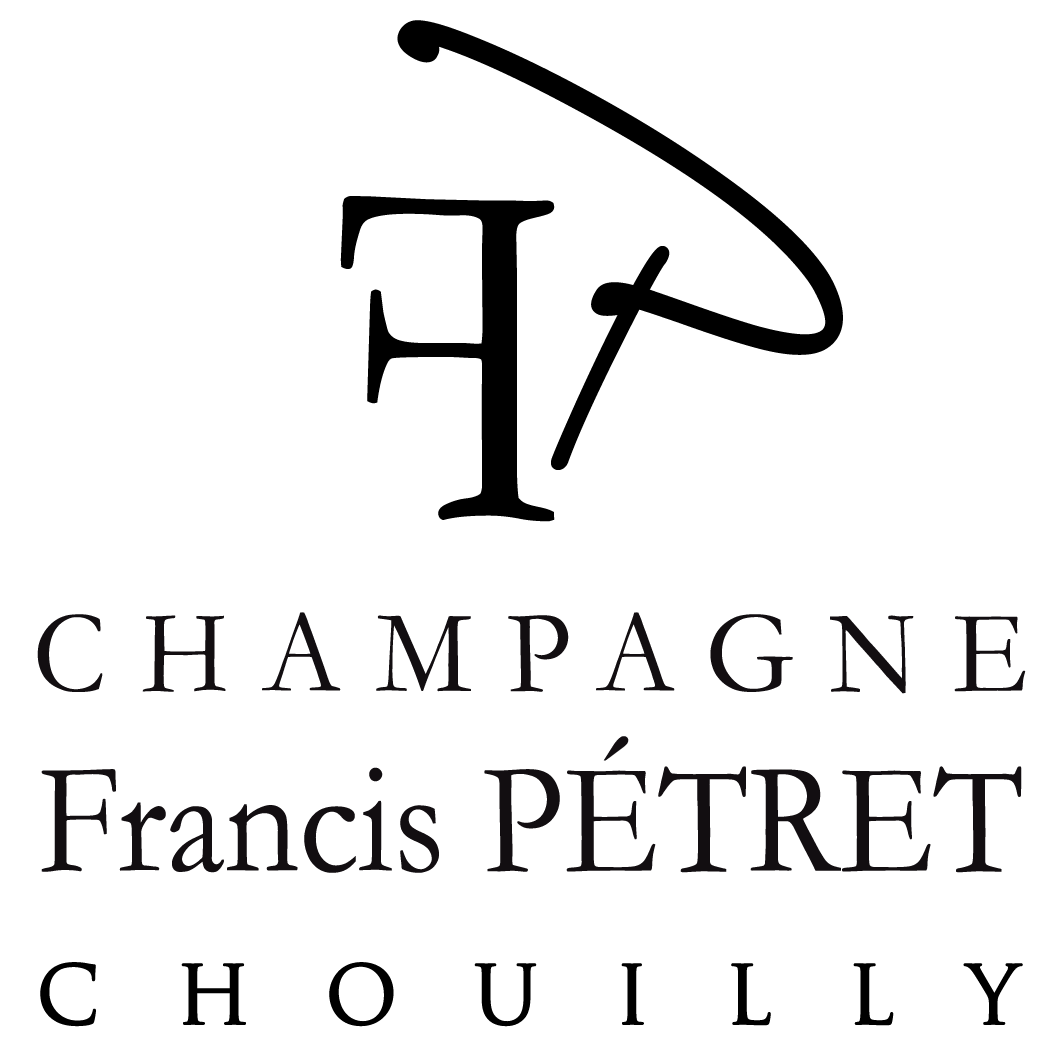
- Industry: Winery
- Founded: 1960
- Founder: Francis Pétret
- Headquarters: 50, rue des Charbonniers - 51530 Chouilly
- Products: Champagnes
- Website: Official website

Champagne Francis Pétret is a Champagne house founded in 1960 and based in Chouilly, near from Épernay. The house, founded in 1988, produces both a blanc de blancs Chardonnay Champagne and a rosé
