= Champagne Mercier =

French Champagne producer

Coordinates: 49.0403877°N 3.9693484°E

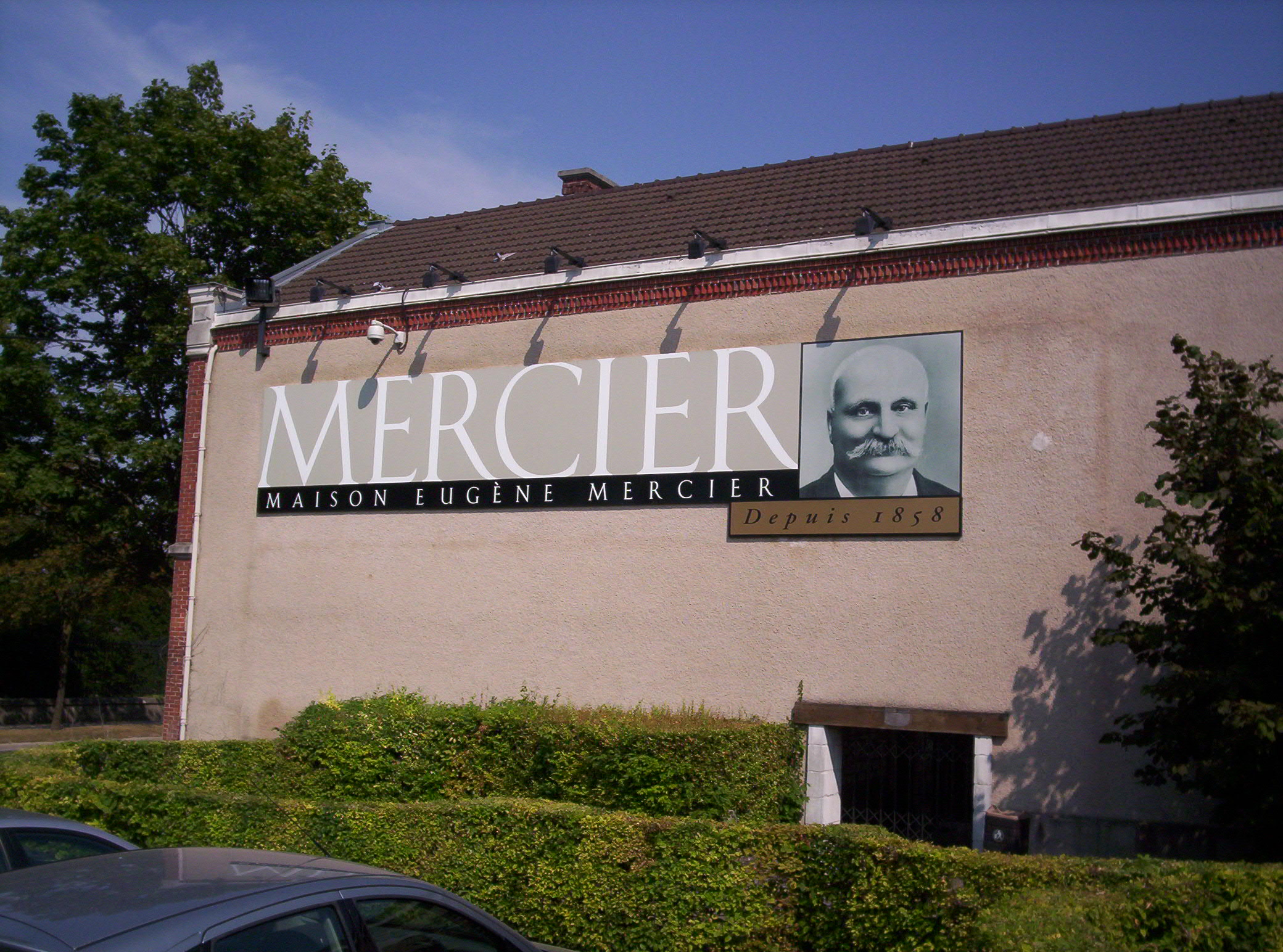
The main facilities of Champagne Mercier.

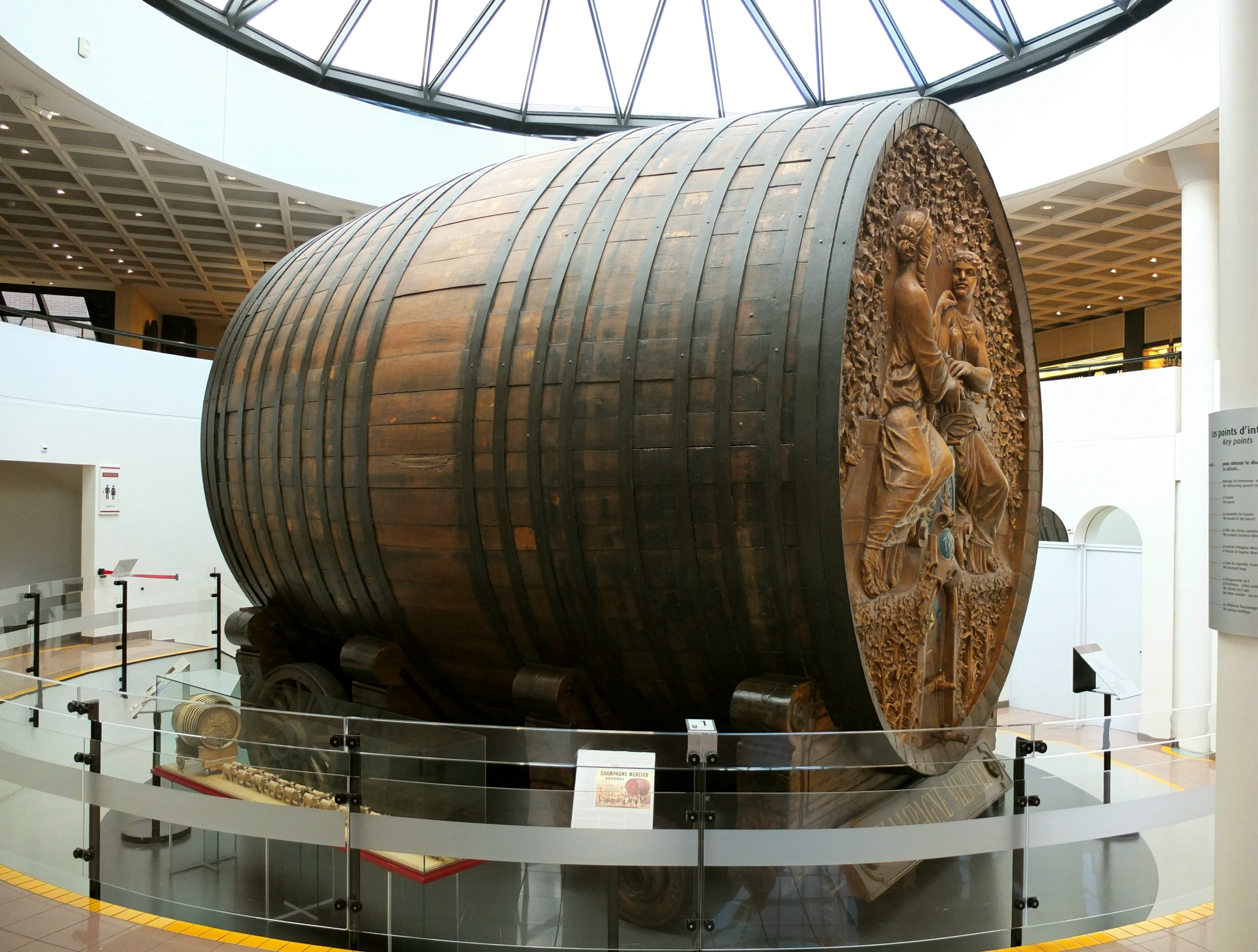
Mercier oak barrel with a capacity of 200,000 Champagne bottles for the world exposition 1889 in Paris

Mercier is a Champagne producer based in the Épernay region of Champagne. The house, founded in 1858 by Eugène Mercier (who died in 1904), produces both vintage and non-vintage cuvée, which is stored in 18 km (11 mi) long cellar tunnels located 30 m (98 ft) underground. Parts of the cellar are open to the public, where visitors can use rail carts to navigate the tunnels. Today, the house owns 576 ha (1,423 acres) of vineyards. Mercier owned the original rights to the name Dom Pérignon but gave the brand to Moët et Chandon in 1927. Today the house is under the umbrella of the LVMH group and is the number one selling brand of Champagne in the domestic French market.

== See also ==
- List of Champagne houses
- simple:Eugène Mercier
