= De Castellane =

Champagne producer in Épernay, France

Coordinates: 49.0426°N 3.9694°E

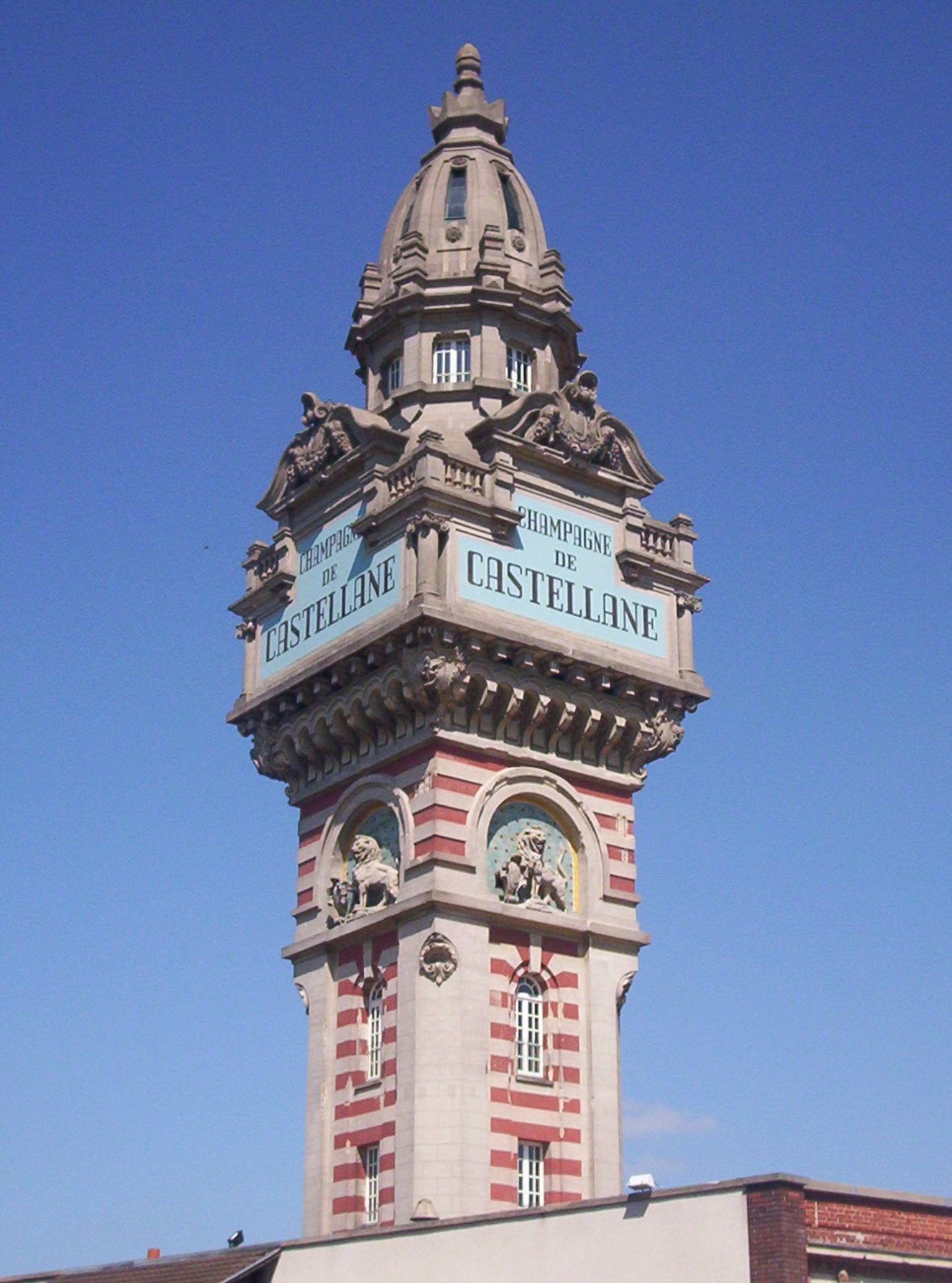
The characteristic tower of De Castellane's main facilities in Épernay.

De Castellane is a Champagne producer based in the Épernay region of Champagne. The house, founded in 1895, produces both vintage and non-vintage cuvee as well as a blanc de blancs Chardonnay Champagne. The house is currently under the ownership of Laurent-Perrier.

== See also ==
- List of Champagne houses
