= Champagne De Venoge =

French Champagne producer

Coordinates: 49.0422678°N 3.9633682°E

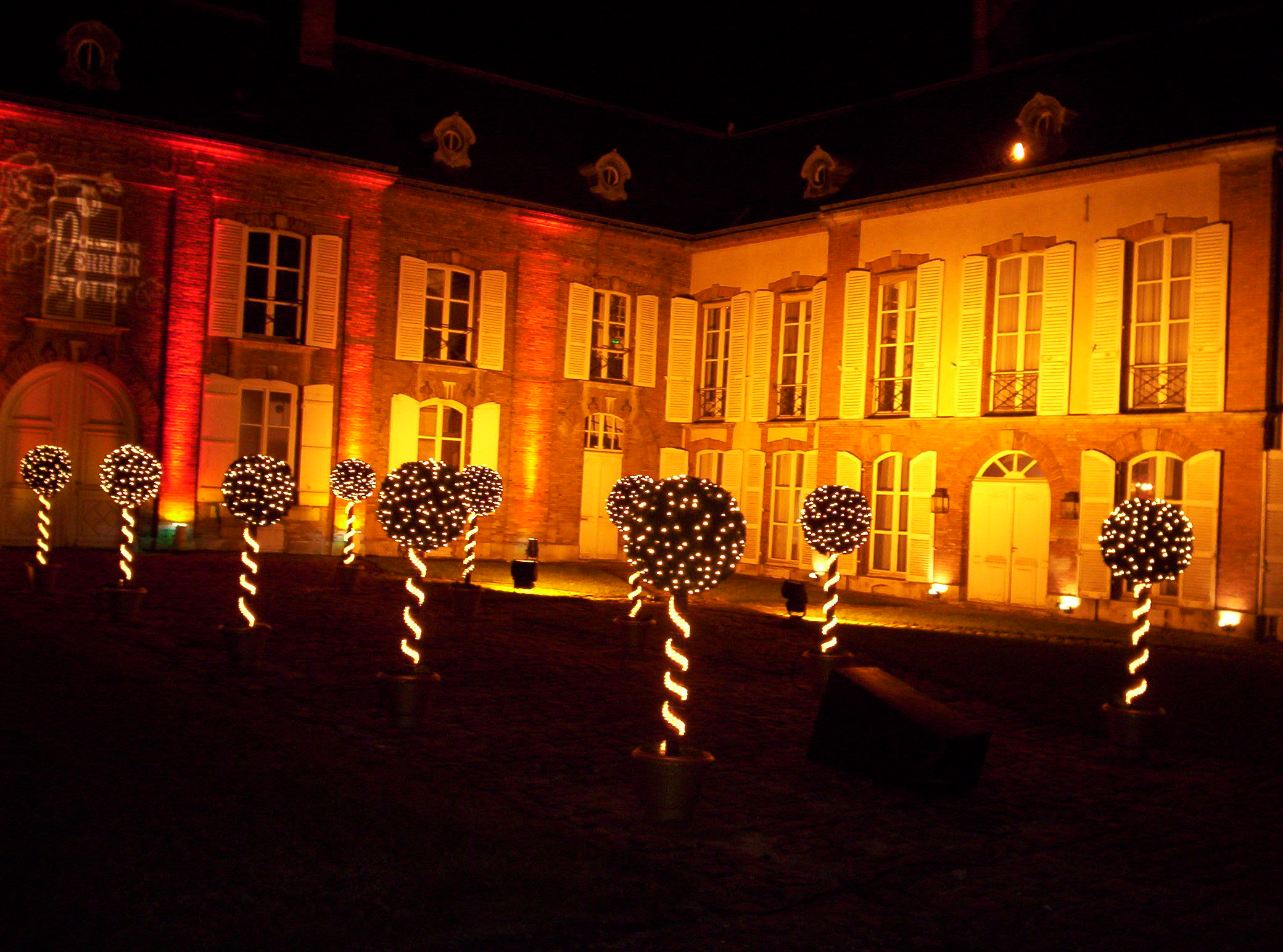
De Venoge in Avenue de Champagne.

Champagne de Venoge is a Champagne producer based in the Épernay region of Champagne. The house was founded in Mareuil-sur-Aÿ in 1837 (189 years ago) by the Swiss Marc-Henri de Venoge, who soon moved operations to Épernay.

The house produces approximately 1,700,000 bottles annually, with cuvées spanning from blanc de blancs to blanc de noirs to the prestige label Des Princes.

== See also ==
- List of Champagne houses
