= Champagne Besserat de Bellefon =

Besserat de Bellefon
- Wine region: Épernay
- Appellation: Champagne
- Founded: 1843; 182 years ago
- Known for: Cuvée Des Moines
- Varietals: Pinot noir, Chardonnay, Pinot Meunier
- Website: besseratdebellefon.com

The Champagne House Besserat de Bellefon was founded in Aÿ in 1843 by Edmond Besserat. The particularity of the Champagne Besserat de Bellefon is that it is made to accompany the meal : indeed each "qualité" of the Cuvée des Moines are elaborate to go with different dishes. That is why this Champagne is distributed only in hotels, restaurants and wine cellars. The Bubbles of the Champagne Besserat de Bellefon are known to be 30% finer than those in a traditional Champagne. It was acquired in 1971 by the Pernod-Ricard group, and eventually bought by Groupe Marne et Champagne, renamed Lanson International. It is actually owned by the Lanson-BCC Group.

The estate owns 25ha of vineyards, and purchases grapes from 110 communes. The house produces approximately 1,300,000 bottles annually.

== See also ==
- Lanson-BCC
- Champagne Lanson
- List of Champagne houses
