= Le Mesnil-sur-Oger =

Mesnil-sur-Oger
- Commune
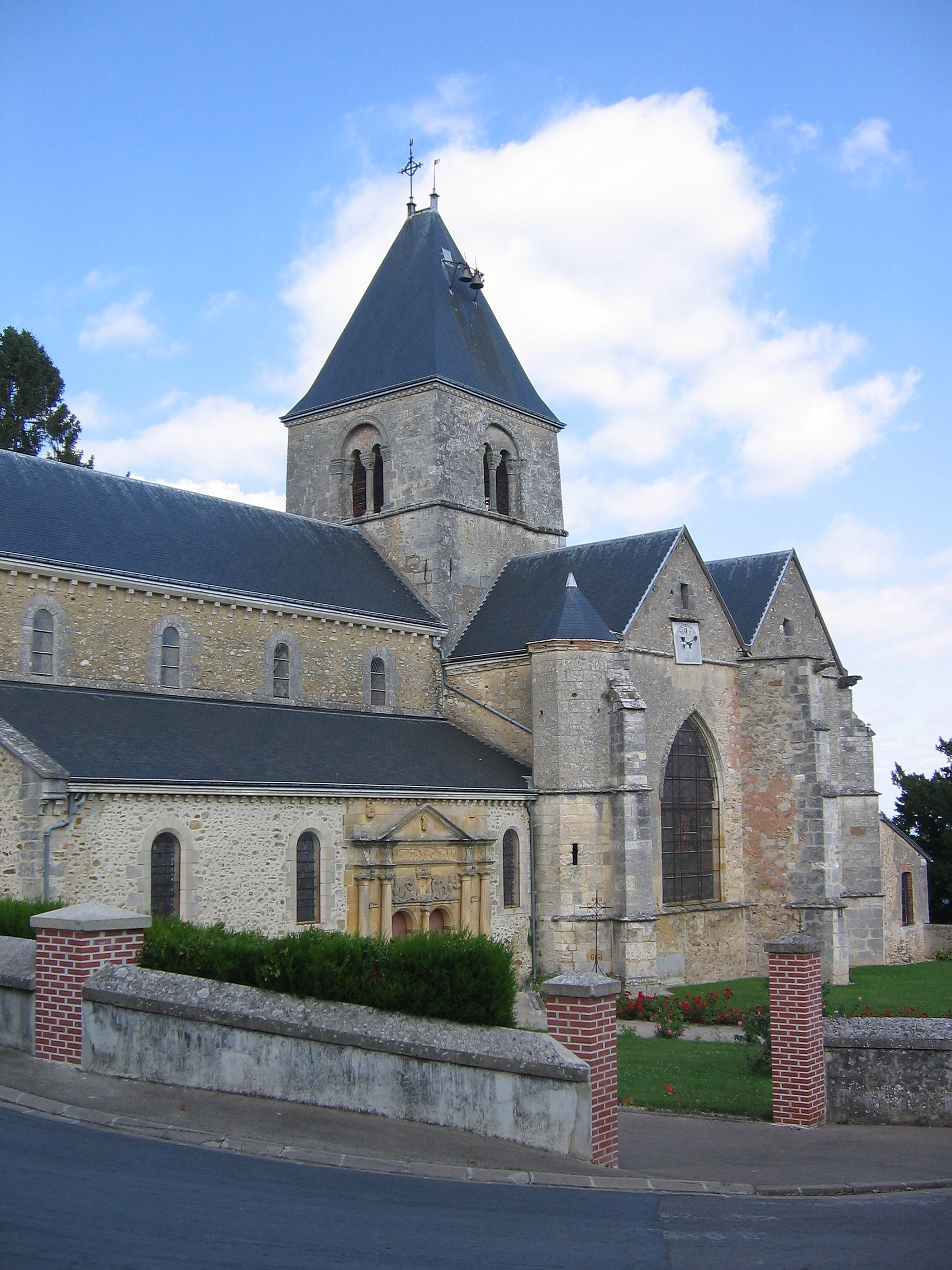
- The Saint-Nicolas church

- Coat of arms
- Location of Mesnil-sur-Oger
- Location within France Location within Grand Est
- Coordinates: 48°56′50″N 4°01′21″E
- Country: France
- Region: Grand Est
- Department: Marne
- Arrondissement: Épernay
- Canton: Vertus-Plaine Champenoise
- Intercommunality: CA Épernay, Coteaux et Plaine de Champagne

Government
  - Mayor (2020–2026): Pascal Launois
- Area^{1}: 7.91 km^{2} (3.05 sq mi)
- Elevation: 119 m (390 ft)
- Population (2023): 988
  - Density: 125/km^{2} (324/sq mi)
- Time zone: UTC+01:00 (CET)
  - Summer (DST): UTC+02:00 (CEST)
- INSEE/Postal code: 51367 /51190
- ^{1} French Land Register data, which excludes lakes, ponds, glaciers > 1 km^{2} (0.386 sq mi or 247 acres) and river estuaries.

Le Mesnil-sur-Oger (French pronunciation: [lə menil syʁ ɔʒe], literally Le Mesnil on Oger) is a commune in the Marne department in the Grand Est region in north-eastern France.

== Champagne ==
The village's vineyards are located in the Côte des Blancs subregion of Champagne, and are classified as Grand Cru (100%) in the Champagne vineyard classification. On wine labels its name is often shortened to Le Mesnil. A Clos-type vineyard in the village is the source of Krug's Clos du Mesnil.

== See also ==
- Communes of the Marne department
- Classification of Champagne vineyards

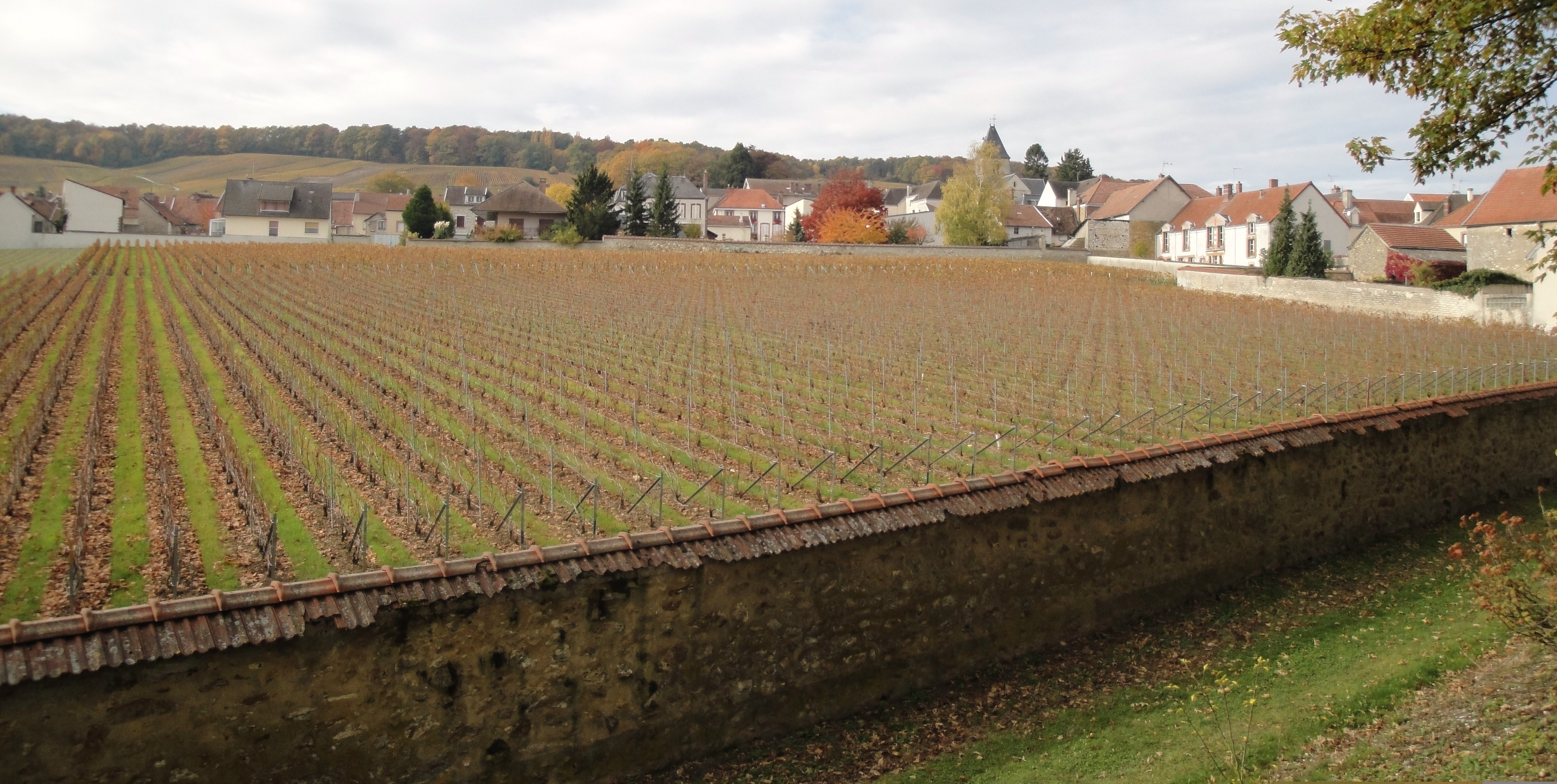
Clos du Mesnil vineyard

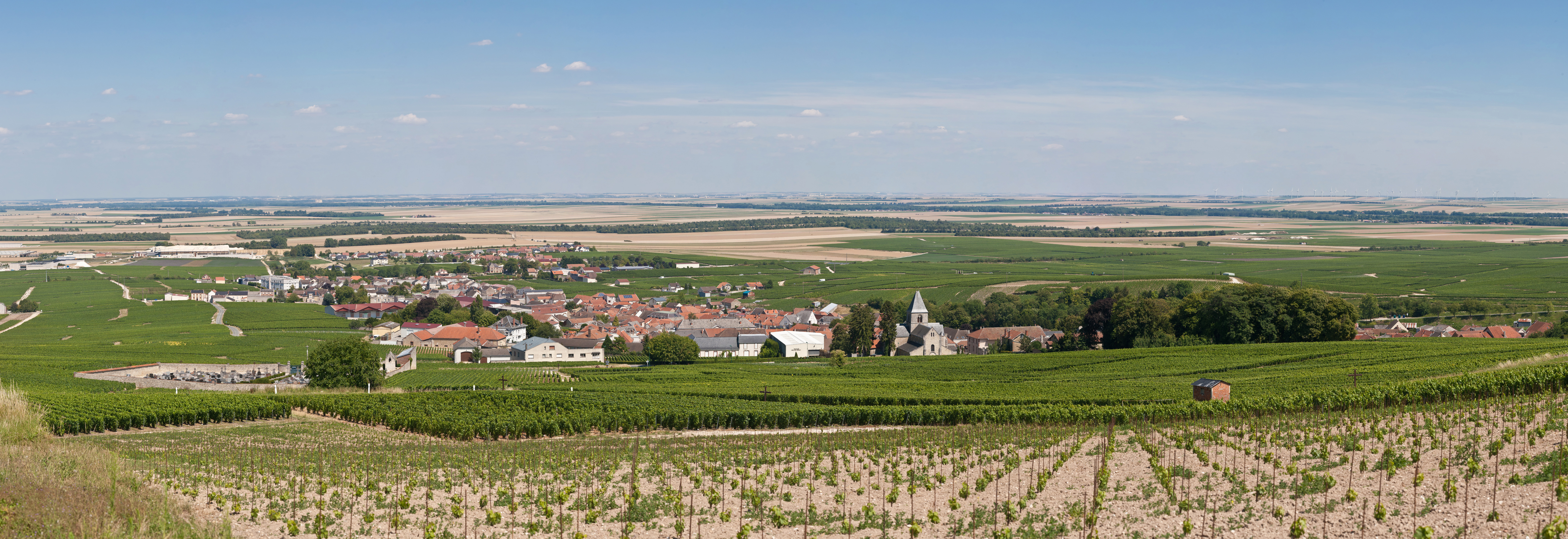
Mesnil-sur-Oger as viewed from the hills nearby
