= Cuvée =

French wine term with several meanings

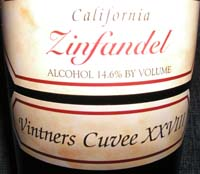
Example of a label on a bottle of Zinfandel indicating "Cuvee XXVIII" (28)

Cuvée (French: [kyve]) is a French wine term that derives from cuve, meaning vat or tank. Wine makers use the term cuvée with several meanings, more or less based on the concept of a tank of wine put to some purpose.

== Wines ==
Cuvée on wine labels generally denotes wine of a specific blend or batch. Since the term cuvée for this purpose is unregulated, and most wines have been stored in a vat or tank at some stage of production, the presence of the word cuvée on a label of an arbitrary producer is no guarantee of superior quality. However, discerning producers who market both regular blends and blends they call "cuvée..." usually reserve the word for special blends or selected vats of higher quality—at least in comparison to that producer's regular wines. Particularly terms like cuvée speciale, or tête de cuvée (the latter especially in Sauternes AOC) are supposed to indicate higher quality. In this context, higher-quality than ordinary cuvées are often referred to as reserve wines, while a cuvée lower in quality than the main one is a second wine.

In some regions, cuvée specifically means a blend, i.e., a wine produced from a mixture of several grape varieties, rather than from a single variety. This is especially true outside France.

In Champagne, and sometimes other regions, producing sparkling wines by the traditional method, cuvée also refers to the best grape juice from gentle pressing of the grapes. In Champagne, the cuvée is the first 2,050 litres of grape juice from 4,000 kg of grapes (a marc), while the following 500 litres are known as the taille (tail), and are expected to give wines of a coarser character. Many Champagne producers pride themselves on only using the cuvée in their wine.

== Other food and drink ==
The term can also apply to beer, or to chocolate to refer to a batch that is blended by the manufacturers to produce a certain taste. Many lambics and gueuzes—sour beers with wine-like characteristics—are marketed as cuvée. When referring to beer, ale, or chocolate the term has no defined meaning, but is meant to evoke images of higher quality—similar to the use of "reserve" for wine in areas where the term is not regulated by law.

The term can also apply to cognac. For instance, 3.140 cuvée, which is not labelled with the standard classifications of VS, VSOP or XO a minimum of six years before bottling.

== See also ==
- Reserve wine
- Second wine
