= Douro quinta classification =

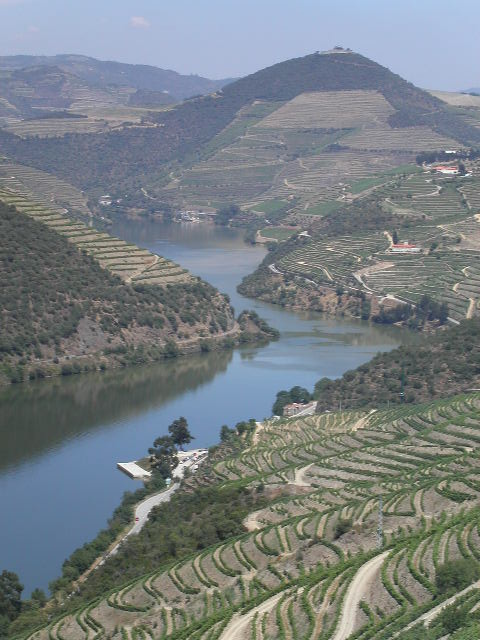
Vineyards in the Douro Valley

The Quinta classification of Port vineyards in the Douro is a system that grades the terroir and quality potential of vineyards in the Douro wine region to produce grapes suitable for the production of Port wine. In Portuguese, a quinta is a wine producing estate, which can be a winery or a vineyard. While other wine classification systems may classify the winery (such as the 1855 Bordeaux classification), the Douro quinta classification is based upon the physical characteristics of the vineyard. The classification system is run by the Instituto dos Vinhos do Douro e Porto (IVDP) and shares some similarities to the classification of Champagne vineyards in that one of the purposes of the system is to ensure that vineyards producing grapes with the highest quality potential receive a high price. A secondary function of the quinta classification is the establishment of permitted yields for production. Quintas with a higher classification (and theoretically capable of producing grapes of higher quality) are permitted to harvest more grapes than a vineyard that received a lower classification.

== History ==
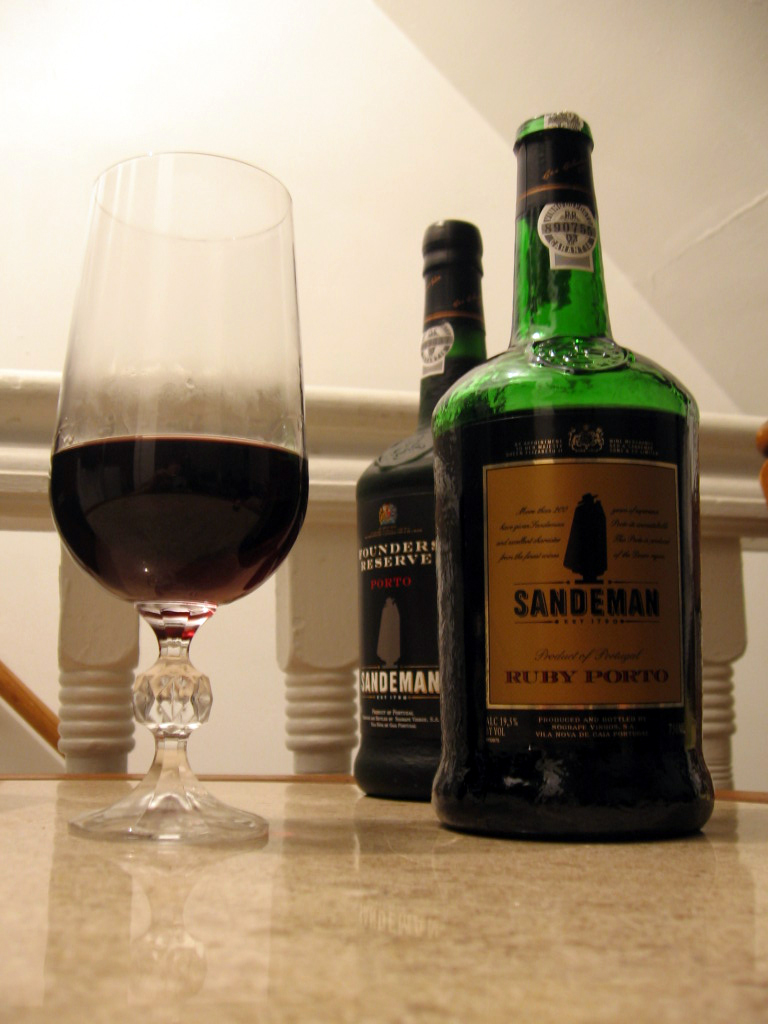
The quinta classification only pertain to grapes that are destined for Port production.

The origins of this system dates back to the quality control regulations installed by Sebastião José de Carvalho e Melo, Marquis of Pombal in the mid 18th century. In the early 18th century, British Port producers (known as "shippers") had tight control over the Port industry, including the leverage to dictate pricing for grapes grown in the Douro valley. A series of scandals hit the Port wine industry, including practice of wine fraud and adulterating poor quality Port with grapes grown outside the region or with foreign ingredients such as elderberry juice, which had the economic impact of driving down Port wine sales and prices across the board. Following complaints by Portuguese wine growers over the business practice of the British and dealing with the growing economic crisis in the Port wine trade, the Marquis of Pombal established the Douro Wine Company with the power to install quality control regulations in the Port industry.

One of these powers was establishing licenses for growers of Port wine grapes and dictating limits or "quotas" for what could be harvested. These quotas (known as the beneficio) would change with each vintage depending on the quality of the vintage and on the current conditions of the wine market. These measures were enacted to ensure that the market wasn't flooded with Port and that the wines that were available were of high quality and not something that could tarnish the reputation of the Douro. Over the years the system of licensing growers turned into a rating classification operated by the IVDP. The system only pertains the production of Port. A quinta that is growing grapes for both Port and table wines, can do whatever they like with the grapes destined for table wine production regardless of its classification rating. Each year the IVDP classifies and rates the vineyards on an A-F scale with A being the highest level. A quinta's rating will dictate the permitted production level of the vineyard and what price the grower can receive for the wine they produce from the grapes.

== Ratings ==
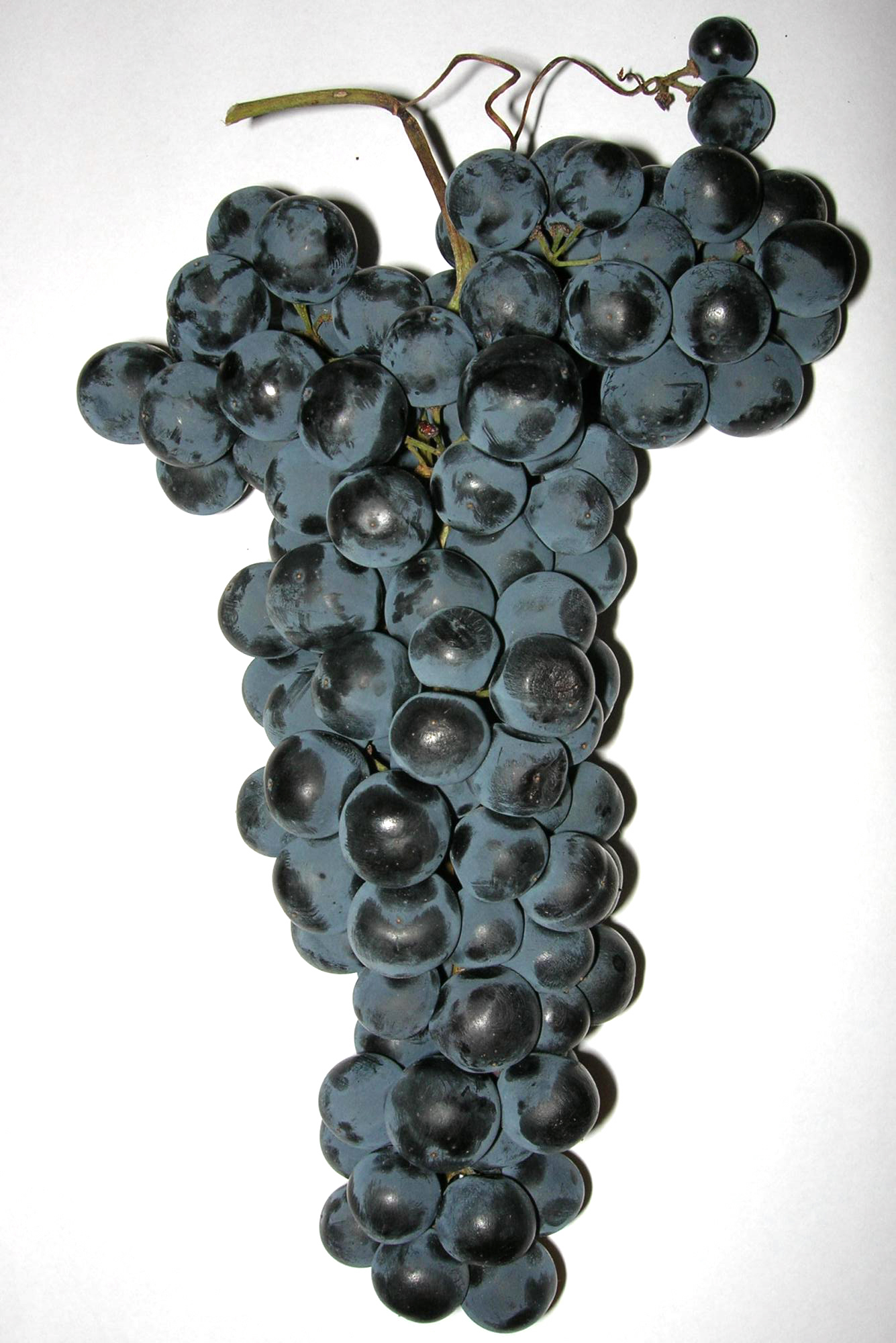
Vineyards planted with grapes deemed "Very Good" for Port wine production, such as Tinta Roriz (also known as Tempranillo) are awarded more points than quintas planted with less favorable grape varieties.

Quintas are given numerical ratings in several categories – age of the vines, altitude, aspect, vine density, gradient, granite content of the soil, schist content of the soil, types of grape varieties planted, overall location of the vineyard, microclimate, mixture, vineyard soil type, vine productivity, and vineyard maintenance. Vineyards that have favorable attributes in a particular category (such as being planted with an optimal low density of vines) are award points while negative attribute (such as having too high of a vine density) receive point deduction. The totals are added up and the vineyard is then given an A-F rating with A being the best possible rating and F being the worst. The higher a quinta's rating, the more grapes the vineyard is permitted to harvest and the higher a price they can expect to receive for their wine.

- A rating - 1,200+ points
- B rating - 1,001-1,199 points
- C rating - 801-1,000 points
- D rating - 601-800 points
- E rating - 400-600 points
- F rating - 399 and below

== Criteria ==
Category	Maximum awarded points possible	Maximum deduction	Comments
Age of vines	60	0	Vines that are older are more highly valued due to their naturally lower yields and more concentrated grapes.
Altitude	150	(-900)	Vineyards at lower altitudes are preferred.
Aspect	250	(-1000)	
Density of planting	50	(-50)	Vineyards with a lower density of planting are preferred.
Gradient	100	(-100)	Vineyards planted on steeper gradients are preferred.
Granite content	0	(-350)	Vineyards with more schistous soils, instead of granite, are preferred.
Grape varieties planted	150	(-300)	Vineyards planted with more the grapes officially recognized as being "Very Good" for Port production, such as Touriga Nacional, Touriga Francesa and Tinta Roriz, are favored.
Location	600	(-50)	
Microclimate	60	0	Evaluation of general terroir characteristics such as how sheltered the vineyard is from detrimental winds, etc.
Mixture	0	(-150)	
Schist content	100	0	Vineyards with higher schist content are preferred.
Soil types	100	(-350)	
Vine productivity	120	(-900)	Vines with a propensity for lower yields are preferred.
Vineyard maintenance	100	(-500)	

Source for graph: T. Stevenson "The Sotheby's Wine Encyclopedia" pp. 334-336 Dorling Kindersley 2005 ISBN 0-7566-1324-8

== See also ==
- Wine Location Specialist
