= CIVC =

CIVC may refer to:

- Le Comité Interprofessionnel du vin de Champagne, the organisation of champagne producers
- CIVC-TV 45, a TV channel in the network Télé-Québec in Trois-Rivières, Canada
- CIVC Partners, a private equity firm
