= Classification of Champagne vineyards =

French wine classification system

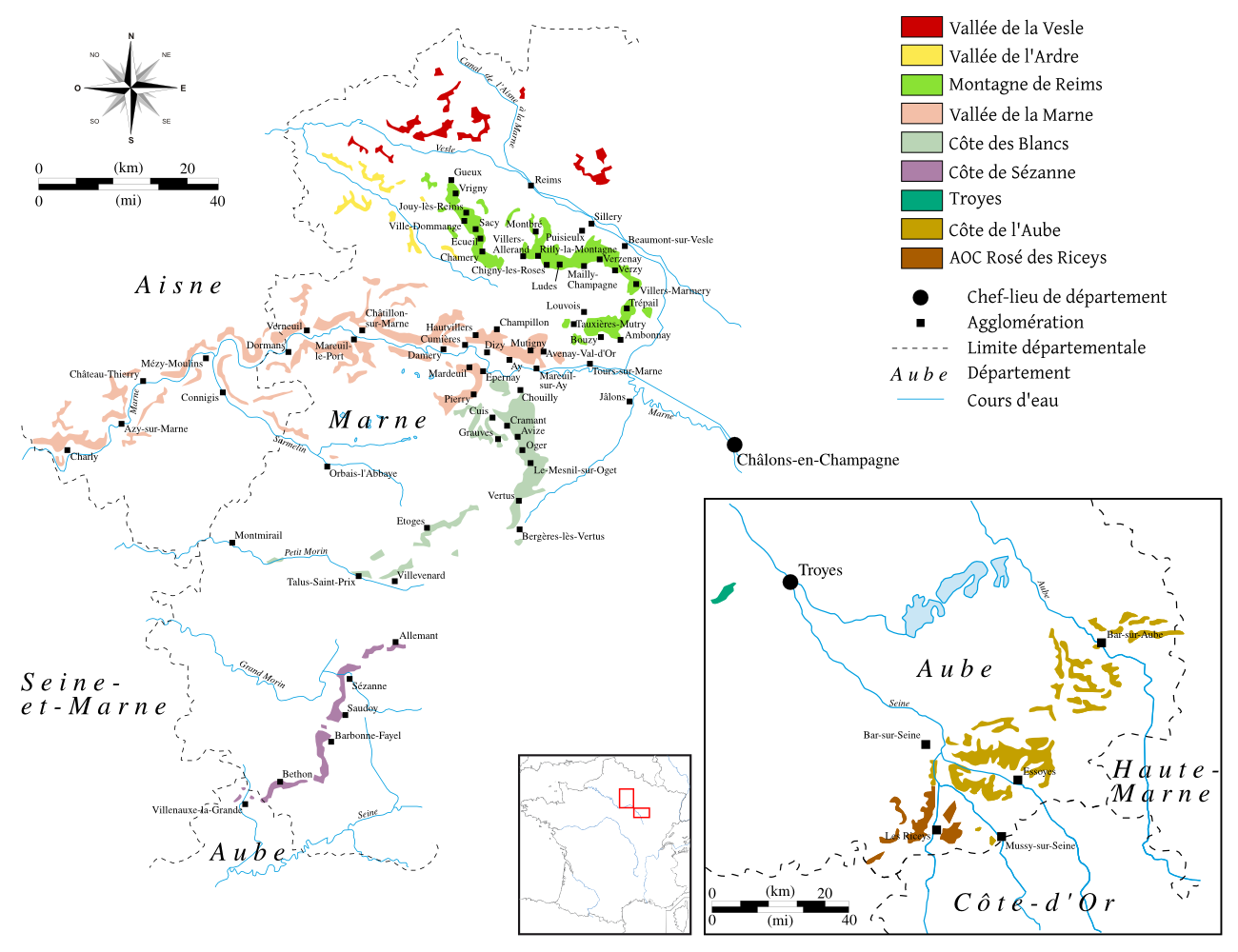
Map of the Champagne wine region.

The classification of Champagne vineyards developed in the mid-20th century as a means of setting the price of grapes grown through the villages of the Champagne wine region. Unlike the classification of Bordeaux wine estates or Burgundy grands crus vineyards, the classification in Champagne is based on what village the vineyards are located in. A percentile system known as the Échelle des Crus ("ladder of growth") acts as a pro-rata system for determining grape prices. Vineyards located in villages with high rates will receive higher prices for their grapes than vineyards located in villages with a lower rating. While the Échelle des Crus system was originally conceived as a 1–100 point scale, in practice, the lowest rated villages are rated at 80%. Premiers crus villages are rated between 90 and 99 percent while the highest rated villages, with 100% ratings are grands crus.

== Origins ==
Prior to the development of the Échelle des Crus systems, the champagne industry functioned on a business dynamic that heavily favored the champagne houses over the vine growers. Since making sparkling wine is a costly and time-consuming endeavor, most vine growers did not have the means or finances to produce champagne themselves. Instead they would sell their grapes to the champagne houses who would produce the wines. In a means to generate greater profit, some champagne houses would look outside the Champagne region for grapes. The development of the French national railroad system in the mid-19th century opened up easy access to cheaper grapes from the Loire Valley and the Languedoc. The Champenois vine growers were incensed at these practices, believing that using "foreign" grapes to make sparkling was not producing true champagne. They petitioned the government for assistance and a law was passed requiring that at least 51% of the grapes used to make champagne needed to come from the Champagne region itself.

With vineyard owners vastly outnumbering the producers, the champagne houses used this dynamic of excess supply vs. limited demand to their advantage. They hired agents, known as commissionaires, to negotiate prices with vine growers. These commissionaires were paid according to how low a price they could negotiate and many employed unsavory tactics to achieve their means-including violence and intimidation. Some commissionaires openly sought bribes from vine growers, often in the form of extra grapes which they would sell themselves for extra profit. The prices they were able to negotiate barely covered the cost of farming and harvesting which left many Champenois vine growers in poverty. With the constant threat of champagne houses ignoring the law and using more "foreign" grapes, tensions were already high between vine growers and Champagne houses when the late 19th century and early 20th century brought with it the devastation of the phylloxera epidemic and a string of poor weather and poor vintages. The tensions culminated in the Champagne Riots of 1910 and 1911. To avoid the type of situation which led to the riots, producers and growers of the Champagne region formed an agreement that developed the Échelle des Crus system where prices would be set by a joint committee of producers and growers, fairly applied and based on the presumed quality of a village's vineyards. In recent times there has been discussion of modifying the classification and going to a "Burgundy-like" system whereby vineyards, rather than villages, would be the basis of ratings. Critics charge that a system based on rating an entire village ignores terroir differences within the large area of a village.

== Pricing structure ==
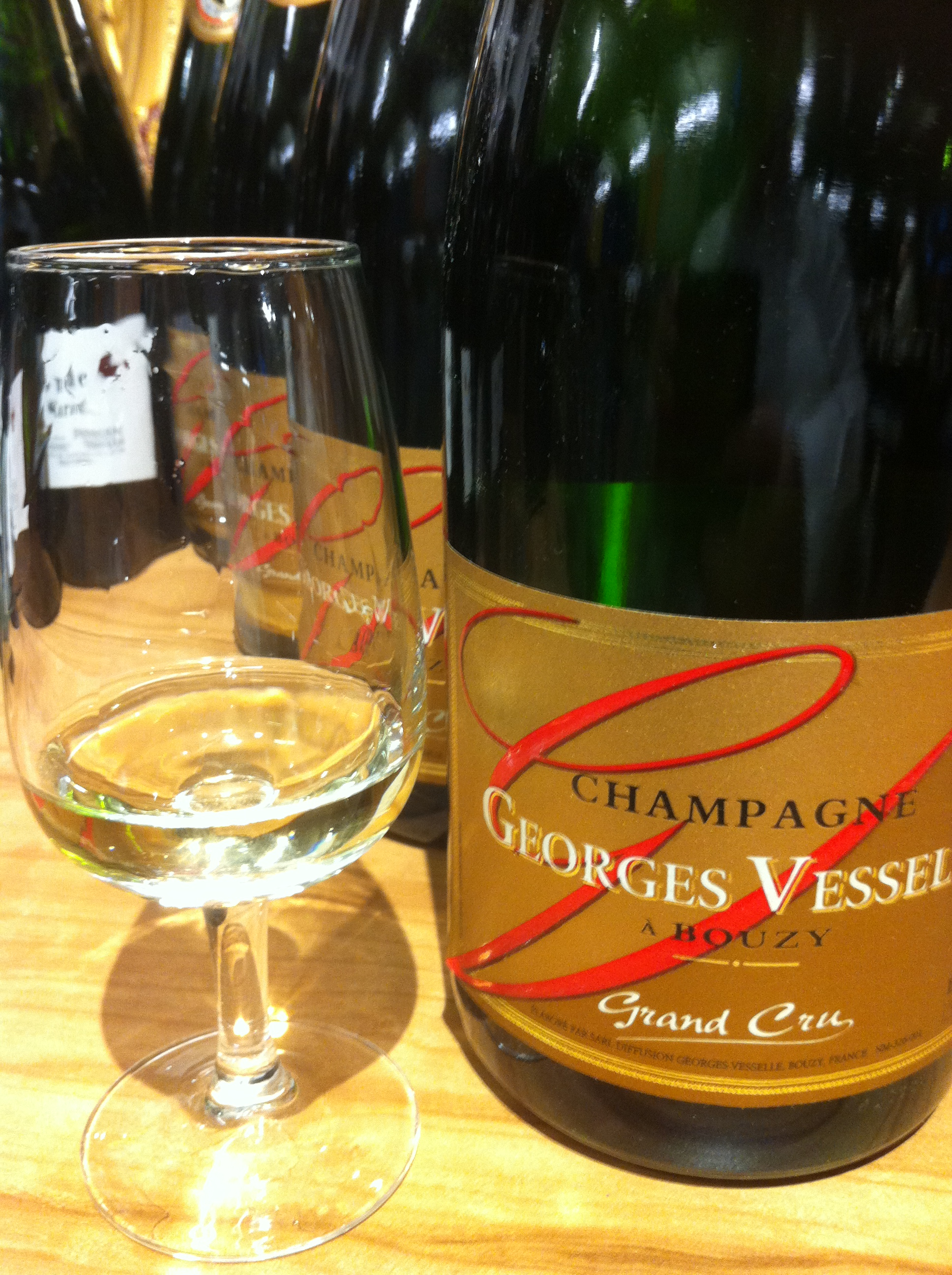
A grand cru champagne

The Échelle des Crus was originally established as a fixed pricing structure. The price for a kilogram of grapes was set and vineyards owners would receive a fraction of that price depending on the village rating where they were located. Vineyards in grands crus villages would receive 100% of the price while premiers crus villages with a 95 rating would receive 95% of the price and so forth down the line. Today the business dynamic between champagne houses and vineyards owners is not so strictly regulated but the classification system still serves as an aid in determining prices with grands and premiers cru vineyards receiving considerably more for their grapes than vineyards in villages with ratings below 90%.

== Grands crus ==
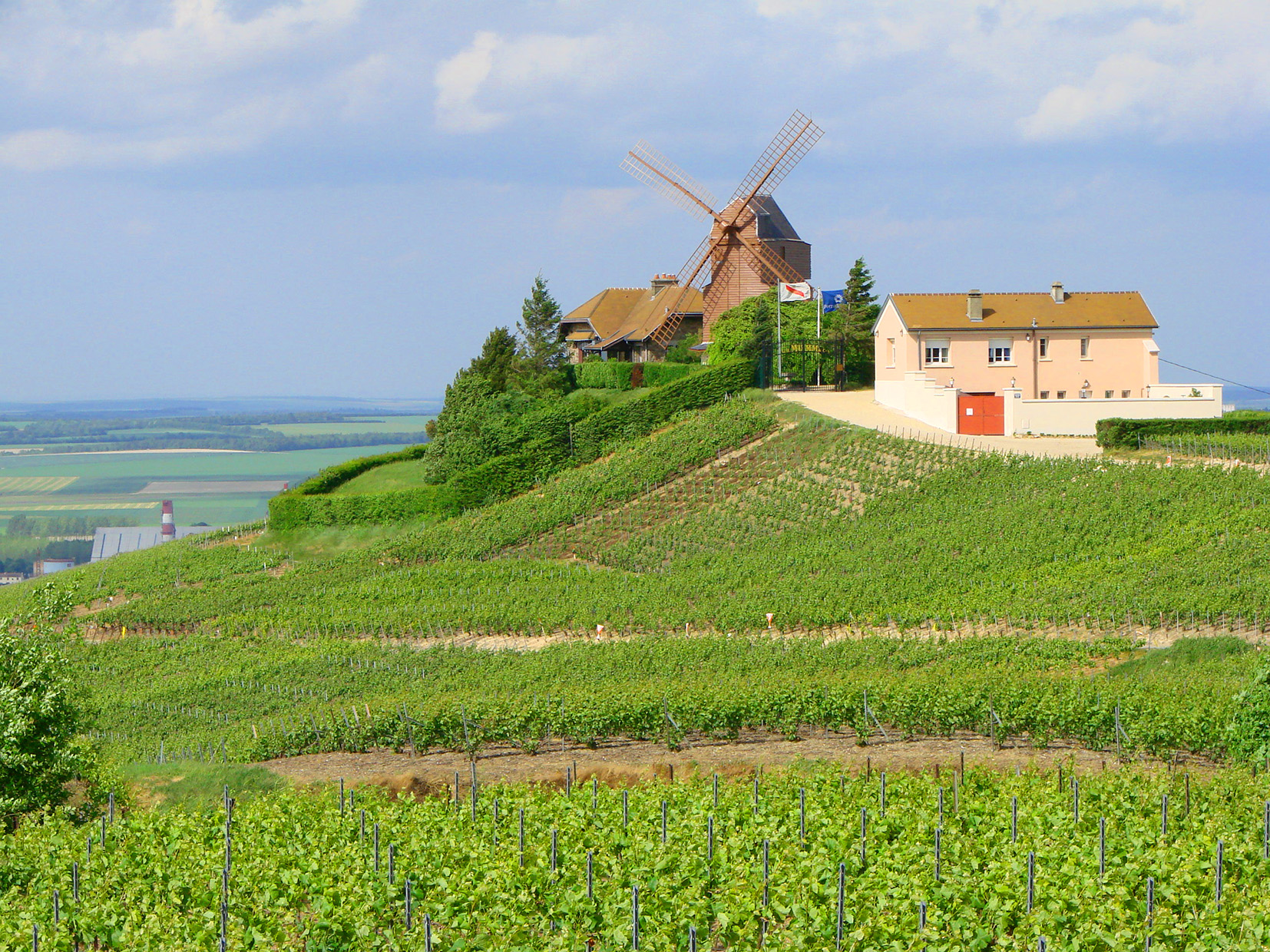
Vineyards in the grand cru village of Verzenay

When the Échelle des Crus was first established, 12 villages received grand cru status. In 1985 that number was expanded to 17 with the promotion of five villages (Chouilly, Mesnil-sur-Oger, Oger, Oiry and Verzy). Less than 9% of all the planted vineyard land in Champagne has received a 100% grand cru rating. The current grands crus of Champagne include:

- Ambonnay
- Avize
- Aÿ
- Beaumont-sur-Vesle
- Bouzy
- Chouilly
- Cramant
- Louvois
- Mailly Champagne
- Le Mesnil-sur-Oger
- Oger
- Oiry
- Puisieulx
- Sillery
- Tours-sur-Marne
- Verzenay
- Verzy

== Usage in champagne ==
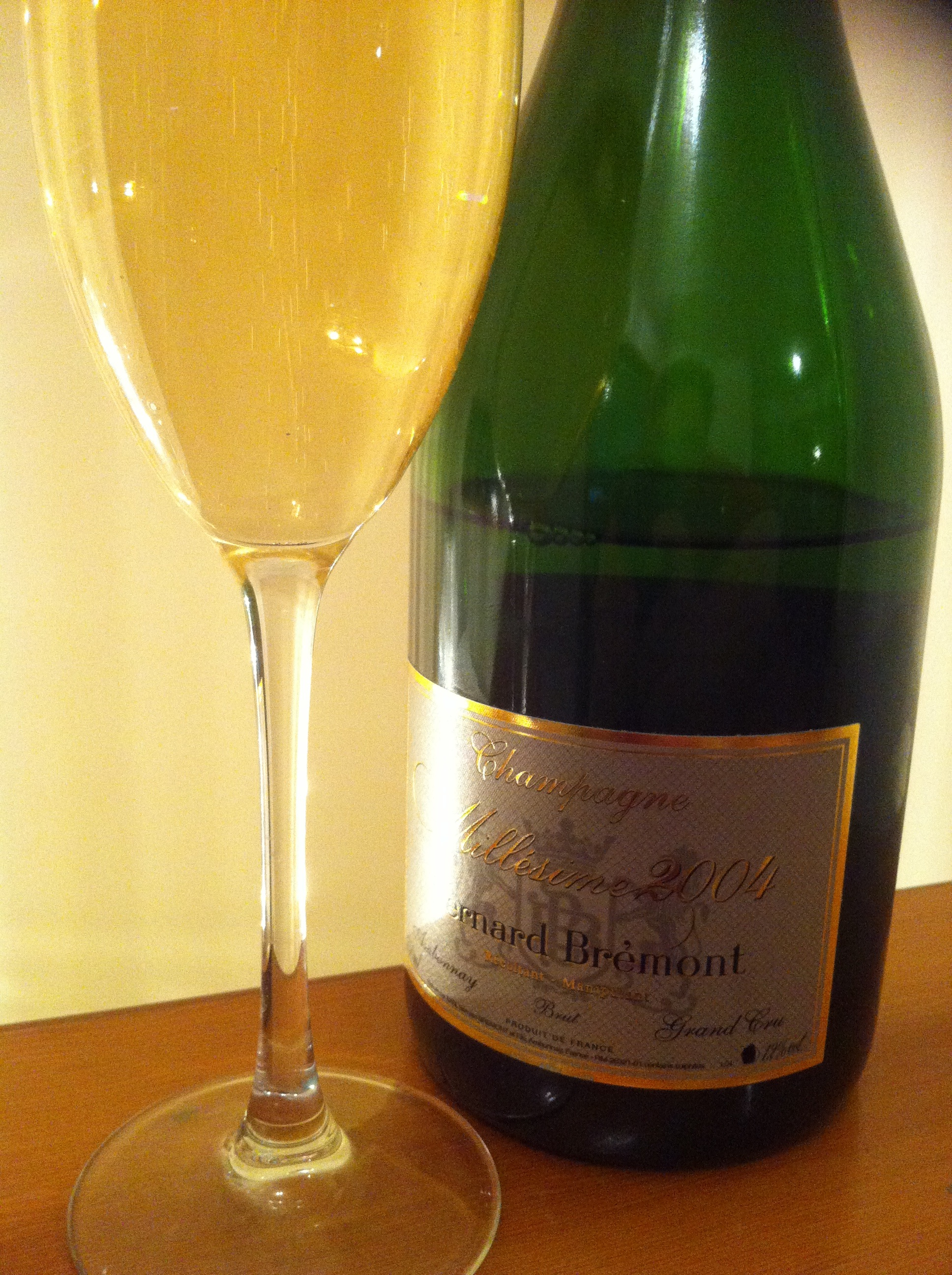
A grand cru champagne from the village of Ambonnay

Champagne is primarily a product of vast blending—of different grape varieties, different vintages and different vineyards—with a typical non-vintage blend being composed of grapes from up to 80 different vineyards. However, for their prestige cuvee (such as Moët et Chandon's Dom Pérignon or Louis Roederer's Cristal) champagne producers will often limit the grape sources to only grands crus (and sometimes premiers crus) vineyards. While single vineyard champagnes are rare, they do exist, such as Krug's Clos du Mesnil coming from the grand cru vineyard located at Le Mesnil-sur-Oger. Grower champagnes, the product of a single producer and vineyard owner, located in grands crus villages will often label their wines "100% grand cru" if their wines qualify for the designation.

== See also ==
- Quinta classification of Port vineyards in the Douro
