= Beaumont-sur-Vesle =

- Commune
- Location of Beaumont-sur-Vesle
- Location within France Location within Grand Est
- Coordinates: 49°10′31″N 4°11′13″E
- Country: France
- Region: Grand Est
- Department: Marne
- Arrondissement: Reims
- Canton: Mourmelon-Vesle et Monts de Champagne
- Intercommunality: CU Grand Reims

Government
  - Mayor (2020–2026): André Tetenoire
- Area^{1}: 5.69 km^{2} (2.20 sq mi)
- Highest elevation: 119 m (390 ft)
- Lowest elevation: 86 m (282 ft)
- Population (2023): 767
  - Density: 135/km^{2} (349/sq mi)
- Time zone: UTC+01:00 (CET)
  - Summer (DST): UTC+02:00 (CEST)
- INSEE/Postal code: 51044 /51360
- ^{1} French Land Register data, which excludes lakes, ponds, glaciers > 1 km^{2} (0.386 sq mi or 247 acres) and river estuaries.

Beaumont-sur-Vesle (French pronunciation: [bomɔ̃ syʁ vɛl], literally Beaumont on Vesle) is a commune in the Marne department in northeastern France.

== Population ==
Historical population
Year	Pop.	±% p.a.
1968	443	—
1975	454	+0.35%
1982	479	+0.77%
1990	686	+4.59%
1999	744	+0.91%
2007	713	−0.53%
2012	702	−0.31%
2017	825	+3.28%
2023	767	−1.21%
Source: INSEE

== Champagne ==
The village's vineyards are located in the Montagne de Reims subregion of Champagne, and are classified as Grand Cru (100%) in the Champagne vineyard classification.

== See also ==
- Communes of the Marne department
- Classification of Champagne vineyards
