= Föglö wreck =

19th-century schooner shipwreck off Finland

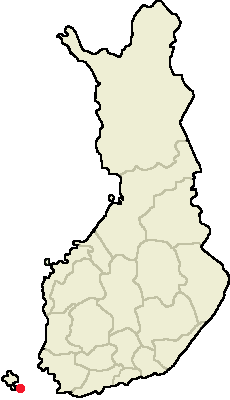
Location of Föglö in Finland

The Föglö wreck (also known as "The Champagne Schooner") is a shipwreck of a 19th-century two-masted schooner (21.5 m long × 6.5 m broad) lying in the waters off Föglö near Åland in Finland. It became famous in the summer of 2010 as several bottles of what was then considered to be world's oldest drinkable champagne were raised from the wreck. However the analysis carried out by Veuve Clicquot in 2018 deemed the champagne undrinkable.

== The wreck and the cargo ==
The identity and the route of the ship is unknown. It has been suggested that the schooner was on its way to Saint Petersburg, carrying a cargo destined for a local merchant or even for the Imperial Russian Court. The two-masted schooner lies at a depth of 55 meters. The hull is 21.5 meters long and 6.5 meters broad. It was discovered in 2003 by the Finnish Maritime Administration but the first diving expedition was made in July 2010 by a group of Finnish and Swedish divers. The objects found from the wreck included items like a large number of champagne bottles, five bottles of beer, two octants and ceramics manufactured by the Swedish company Rörstrand between 1780 and 1830. According to the Finnish Antiquities Act, the cargo belongs to the Government of Åland.

== The champagne ==
The total number of bottles was 168 of which 145 were champagne, most of them well preserved. 95 of them are bottled by Juglar, a defunct champagne house merged 1829 into Jacquesson, 46 by Veuve Clicquot and four by Heidsieck, known as Piper-Heidsieck since 1838. Two bottles were opened in a press conference held in Mariehamn, the capital of Åland Islands in November 2010. A member of Veuve Clicquot's winemaking team described the champagne as "a toasted, zesty nose with hints of coffee, and a very agreeable taste with accents of flowers and lime-tree."

The Government of Åland decided to place some bottles on a display at the Åland Museum and sell the rest of them. The first auction was held in June 2011 in Mariehamn. A bottle of Veuve Clicquot was sold for a record-setting price of 30,000 euros and another bottle of Juglar for 24,000 euros. The champagne was bought by a Russian restaurant in Singapore.

The second, and so far the last, auction was held in June 2012 as the French auction house Artcurial sold eight bottles in Mariehamn for 109,000 euros. The price was a disappointment as the expected amount for eleven bottles was up to 200,000 euros. The most expensive bottle was sold only for 15,000 euros and three left unsold. The Government of Åland will donate the surplus to marine archaeological research, maritime history and environmental measures of the Baltic Sea.

== The beer ==
The beer raised from the wreck was analyzed by the VTT Technical Research Centre of Finland which traced the beer to Belgium.

== Sources ==
- The Champagne Schooner, Government of Åland
