= Ambonnay =

French commune

- Commune
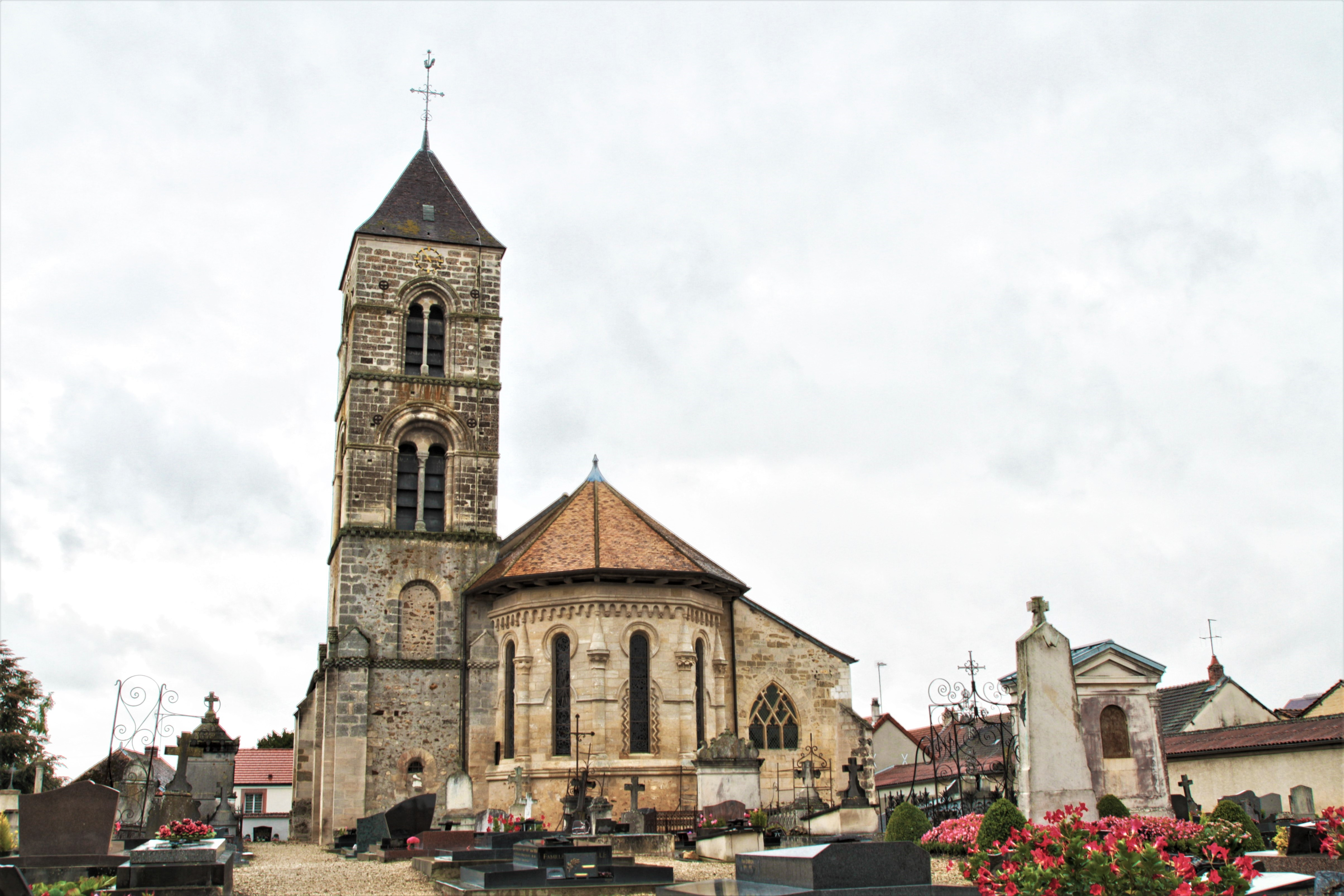
- The church in Ambonnay
- Location of Ambonnay
- Location within France Location within Grand Est
- Coordinates: 49°04′41″N 4°10′24″E
- Country: France
- Region: Grand Est
- Department: Marne
- Arrondissement: Épernay
- Canton: Épernay-1
- Intercommunality: Grande Vallée de la Marne

Government
  - Mayor (2020–2026): Nathalie Coutier
- Area^{1}: 11.8 km^{2} (4.6 sq mi)
- Elevation: 99 m (325 ft)
- Population (2023): 941
  - Density: 79.7/km^{2} (207/sq mi)
- Time zone: UTC+01:00 (CET)
  - Summer (DST): UTC+02:00 (CEST)
- INSEE/Postal code: 51007 /51150
- ^{1} French Land Register data, which excludes lakes, ponds, glaciers > 1 km^{2} (0.386 sq mi or 247 acres) and river estuaries.

Ambonnay (French pronunciation: [ɑ̃bɔnɛ]) is a commune in Marne, a department in northeastern France.

== Population ==
Historical population
Year	Pop.	±% p.a.
1968	858	—
1975	817	−0.70%
1982	801	−0.28%
1990	917	+1.70%
1999	934	+0.20%
2007	945	+0.15%
2012	941	−0.08%
2017	970	+0.61%
2023	941	−0.50%
Source: INSEE

== Champagne ==
The village's vineyards are located in the Montagne de Reims subregion of Champagne, and are classified as grand cru (100%) in the Champagne vineyard classification. A clos-type vineyard in the village is the source of Krug's Clos d'Ambonnay.

== See also ==
- Communes of the Marne department
- Classification of Champagne vineyards
- Montagne de Reims Regional Natural Park
