= Mailly-Champagne =

- Commune
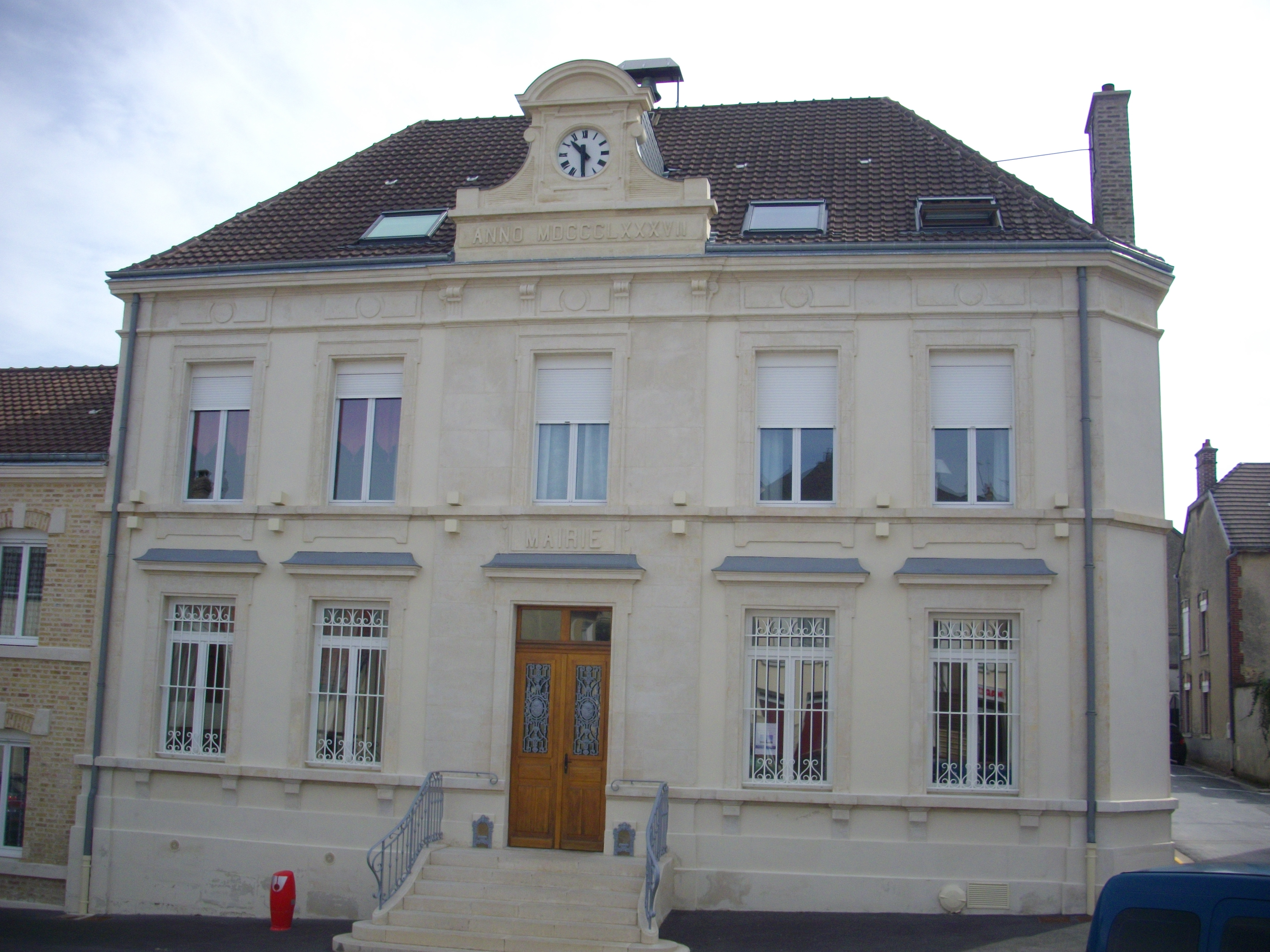
- The town hall in Mailly-Champagne
- Location of Mailly-Champagne
- Location within France Location within Grand Est
- Coordinates: 49°09′23″N 4°06′46″E
- Country: France
- Region: Grand Est
- Department: Marne
- Arrondissement: Reims
- Canton: Mourmelon-Vesle et Monts de Champagne
- Intercommunality: CU Grand Reims

Government
  - Mayor (2020–2026): Michel Hutasse
- Area^{1}: 10.06 km^{2} (3.88 sq mi)
- Highest elevation: 283 m (928 ft)
- Lowest elevation: 96 m (315 ft)
- Population (2023): 617
  - Density: 61.3/km^{2} (159/sq mi)
- Time zone: UTC+01:00 (CET)
  - Summer (DST): UTC+02:00 (CEST)
- INSEE/Postal code: 51338 /51500
- ^{1} French Land Register data, which excludes lakes, ponds, glaciers > 1 km^{2} (0.386 sq mi or 247 acres) and river estuaries.

Mailly-Champagne (French pronunciation: [maji ʃɑ̃paɲ]) is a commune in the Marne department in north-eastern France.

Population (2017): 661. Inhabitant Name: maillotin(e).

Mailly-Champagne is a small village inserted in Champagne vineyard on the north of the Montagne de Reims, 8 km south of Reims, and on the north of Épernay.

== Champagne ==
Mailly is known for its Champagne. The village's vineyards are located in the Montagne de Reims subregion of Champagne, and are classified as Grand Cru (100%) in the Champagne vineyard classification.

== See also ==
- Communes of the Marne department
- Classification of Champagne vineyards
- Champagne Mailly
- Montagne de Reims Regional Natural Park
