= Föglö =

- Municipality
- Föglö kommun
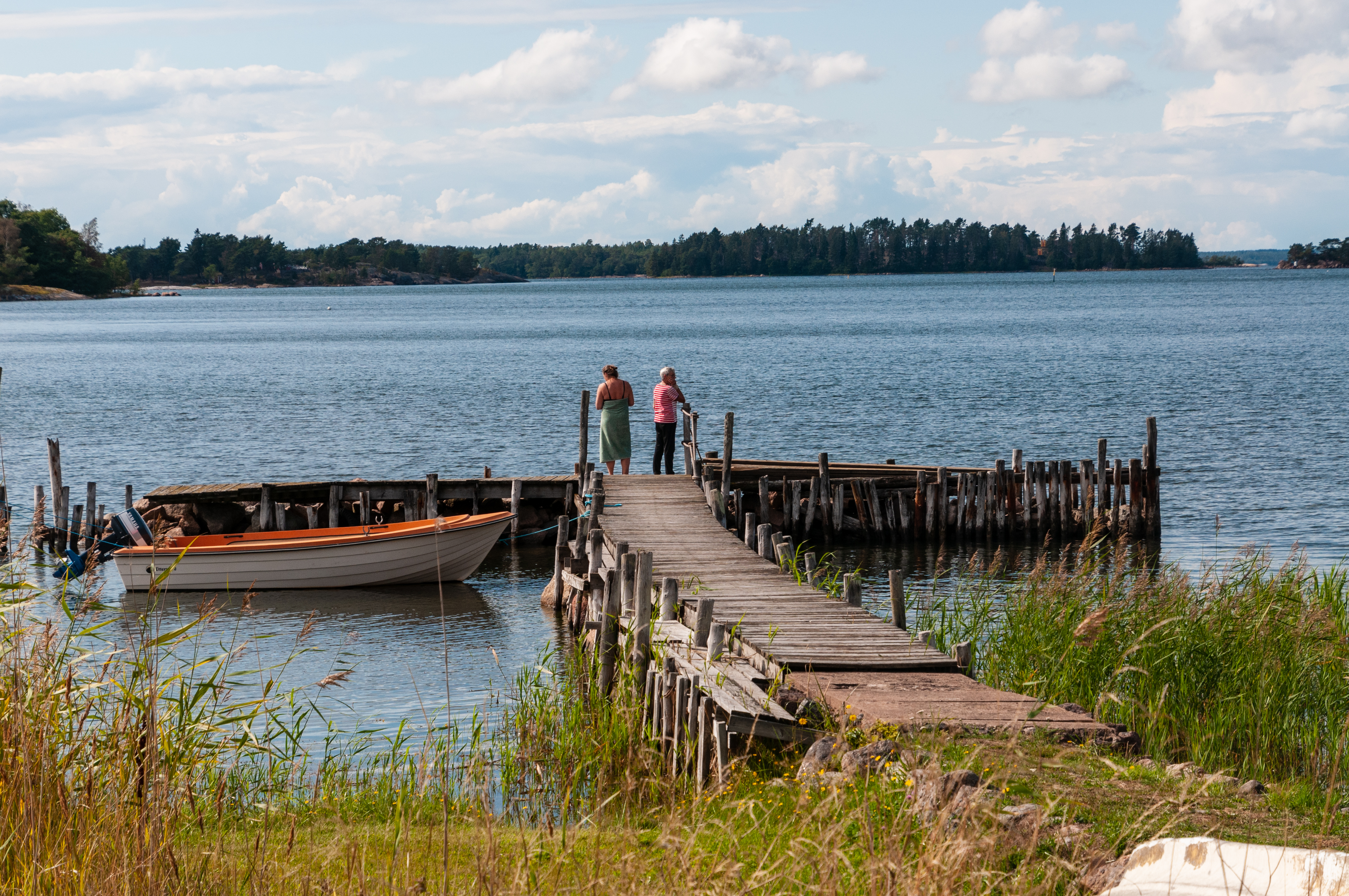
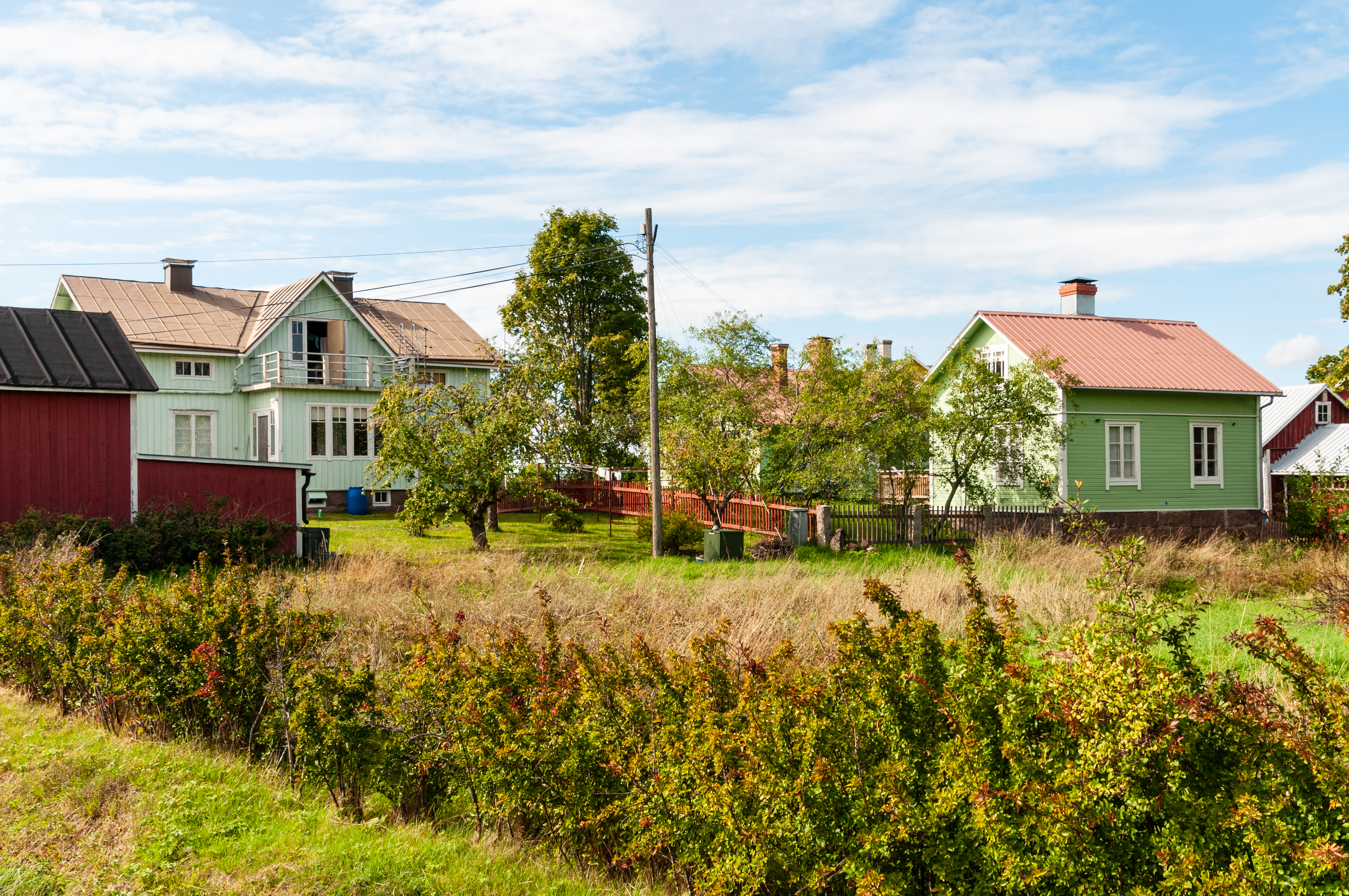
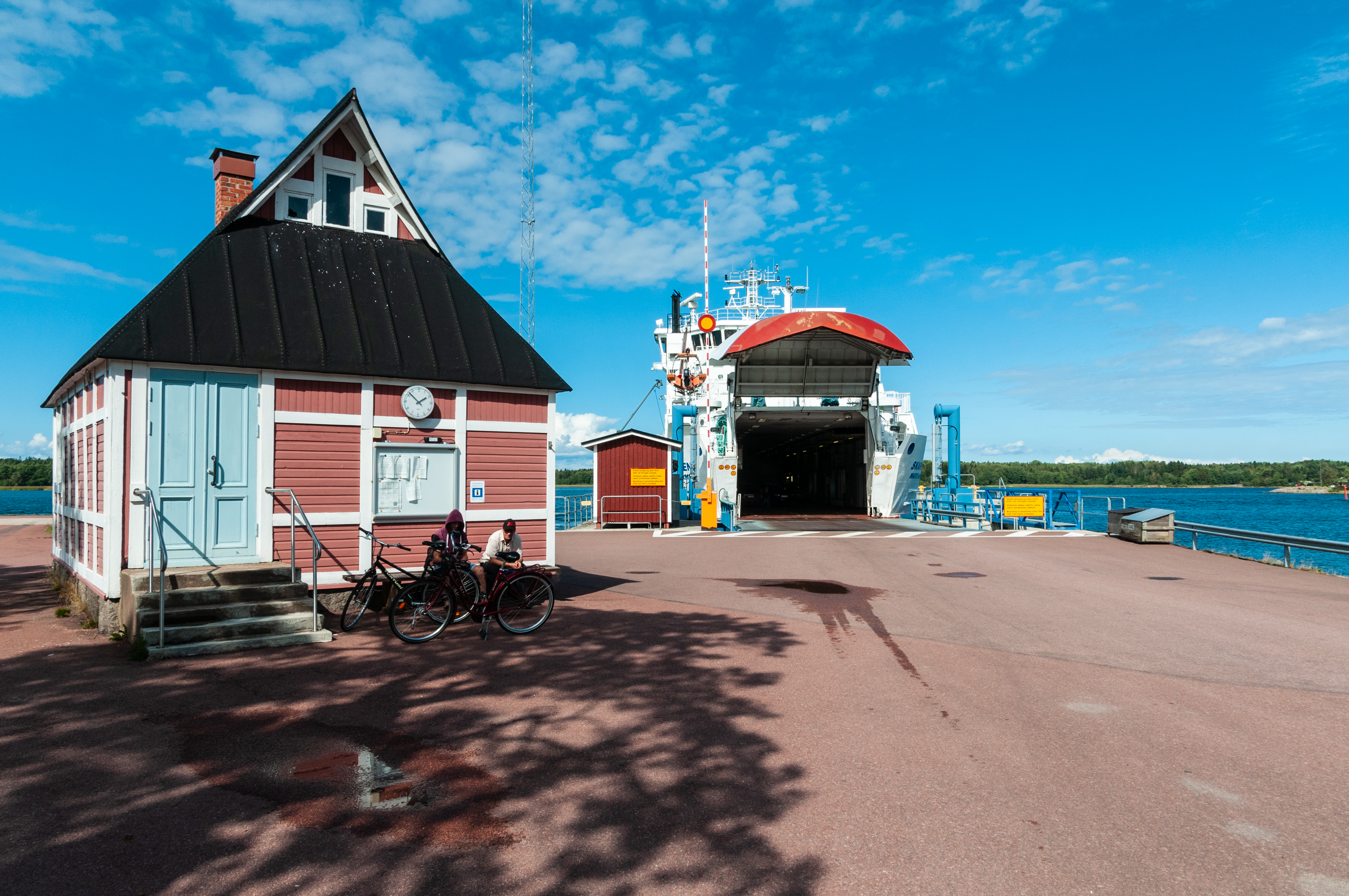
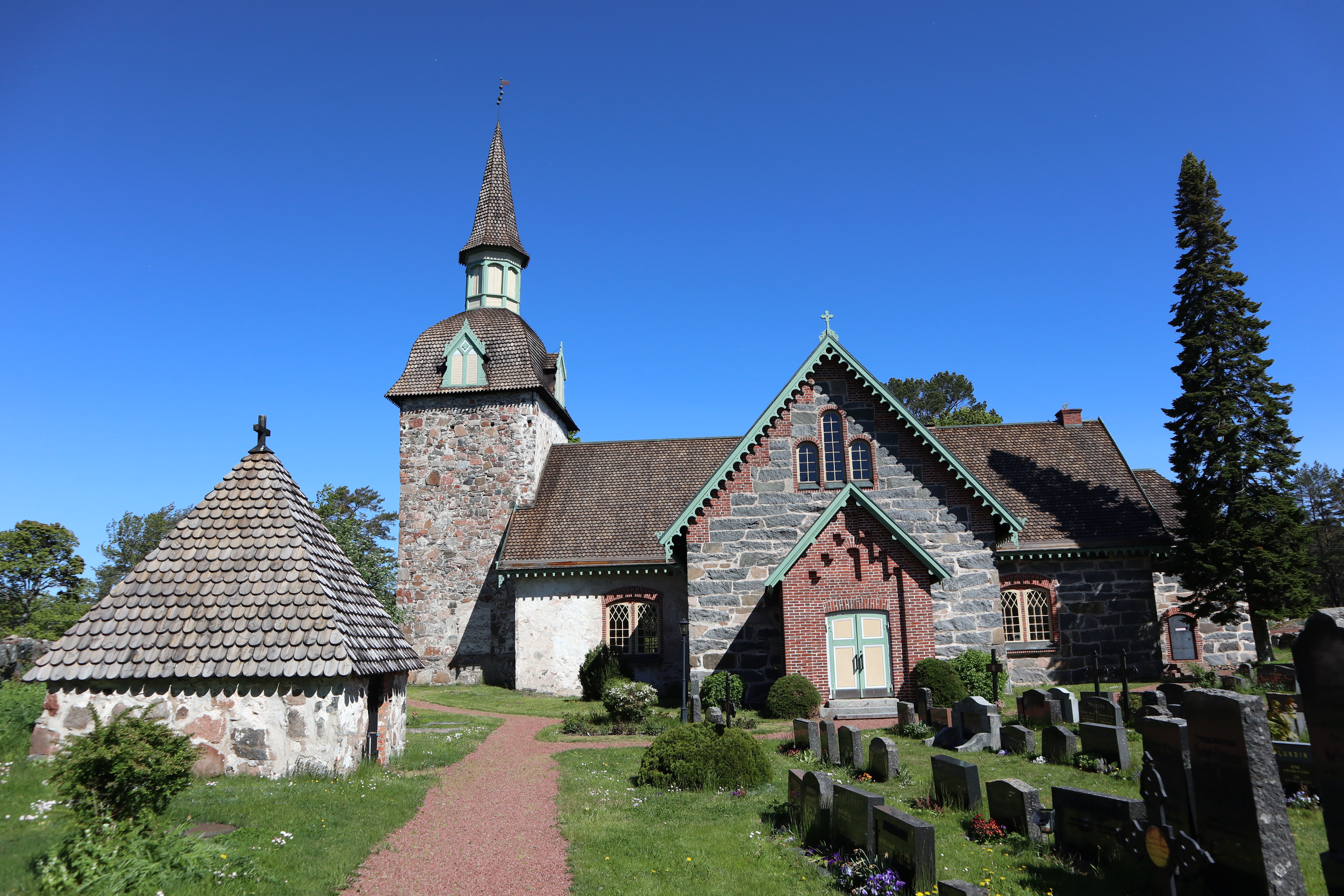
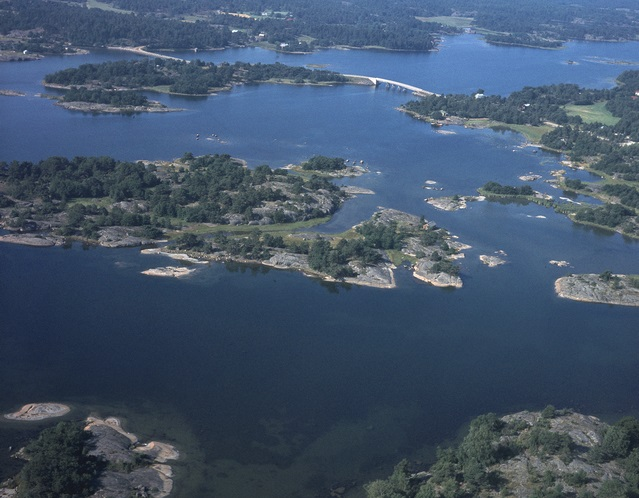

- Flag Coat of arms

- Location of Föglö in Finland

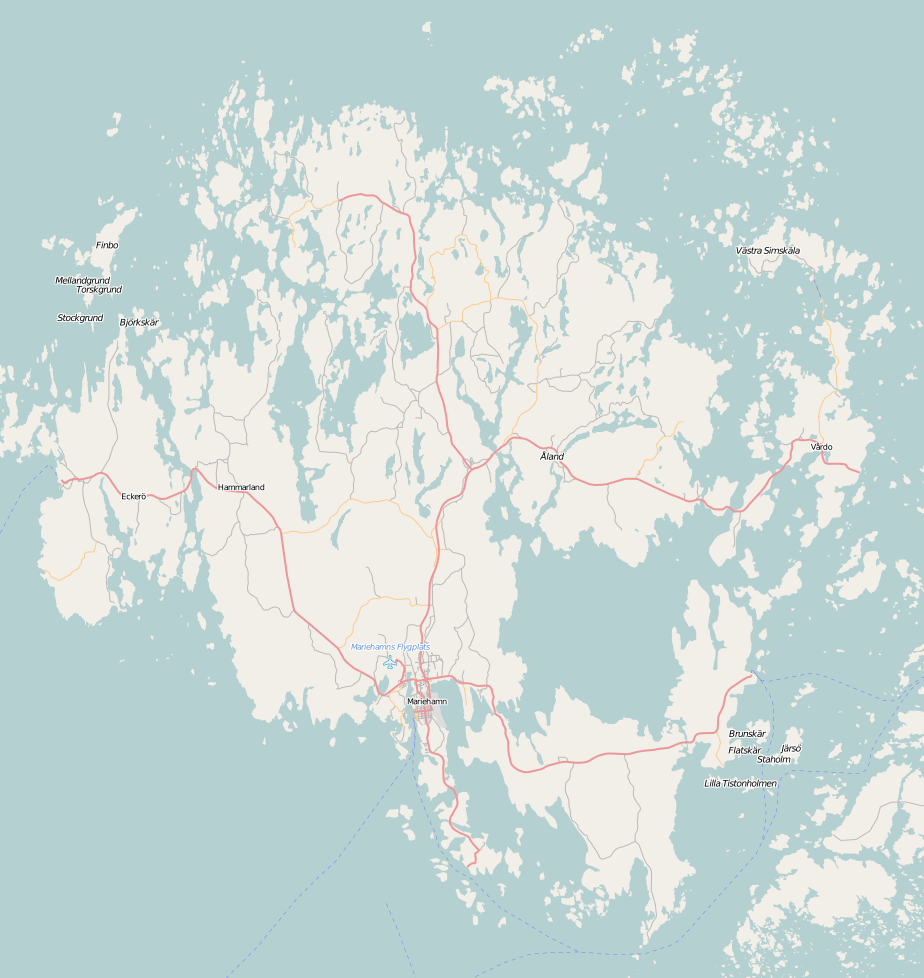
- Location in Åland
- Coordinates: 60°01′50″N 020°23′15″E
- Country: Finland
- Region: Åland
- Sub-region: Archipelago
- Seat: Degerby

Government
  - Municipal manager: Niklas Eriksson

Area (2018-01-01)
  - Total: 1,869.07 km^{2} (721.65 sq mi)
  - Land: 134.77 km^{2} (52.03 sq mi)
  - Water: 1,734.24 km^{2} (669.59 sq mi)
  - Rank: 286th largest in Finland

Population (2025-12-31)
  - Total: 512
  - Rank: 302nd largest in Finland
  - Density: 3.8/km^{2} (9.8/sq mi)

Population by native language
  - Swedish: 79.7% (official)
  - Finnish: 3.7%
  - Others: 16.6%

Population by age
  - 0 to 14: 13.7%
  - 15 to 64: 54.8%
  - 65 or older: 31.6%
- Time zone: UTC+02:00 (EET)
  - Summer (DST): UTC+03:00 (EEST)
- Website: www.foglo.ax

Föglö is a group of islands and municipality in Åland, an autonomous territory of Finland.

The municipality has a population of 512 (31 December 2025) and covers an area of 1,869.07 square kilometres (721.65 sq mi) of which 1,734.24 km^{2} (669.59 sq mi) is water. The population density is 3.8 inhabitants per square kilometre (9.8/sq mi). The municipality is unilingually Swedish, yet in the last decade there has been some immigration from Estonia and Latvia due to the need of employees at the fish farms, the main industry in Föglö. The municipality is connected only by ferries to Lumparland which has a road connection to Mariehamn, and by ferries to mainland Finland.

Erik Adolf von Willebrand discovered von Willebrand disease of the blood by observing a family in Föglö.

Håkan Skogsjö has documented the permanently residing population of Föglö from the 17th century to the present, covering the history of the municipality as a whole, its individual hamlets, down to each original farmstead and the families who lived there.

== See also ==
- Föglö wreck
