= Champagne Mailly =

Wine produced in Mailly-Champagne, France

Champagne Mailly is a wine produced by “La Société de Producteurs de Mailly Champagne” in Mailly-Champagne, Marne, France.

== History ==
After the first world war and at the time of the Great Depression a group of winegrowers from the village of Mailly Champagne joined to create the “Société de Producteurs de Mailly Champagne”. They decided to produce champagne with grapes exclusively grown in Mailly Champagne. To be able to store their production they carved out their own cellars and cave. It took them 30 years to create 1 km long cellar corridors where the bottles are aged.

In 1950 Construction of a new building to host the offices and the production area.

In 1970 Building expansion.

In 2000 Launch of the “artistic” range.

In 2001–2002, and in 2007 Collaboration with Giovanni Pace (architect) to create a new building for the offices, the reception of the public and the enlargement and modernisation of the cellars.

In 2020 Champagne Mailly Grand Cru means: 80 members (winegrowers), 72 ha of vineyards ( only on the terroir of Mailly Champagne), 500 000 bottles sold per year ( 60% export, 40% on the French market)

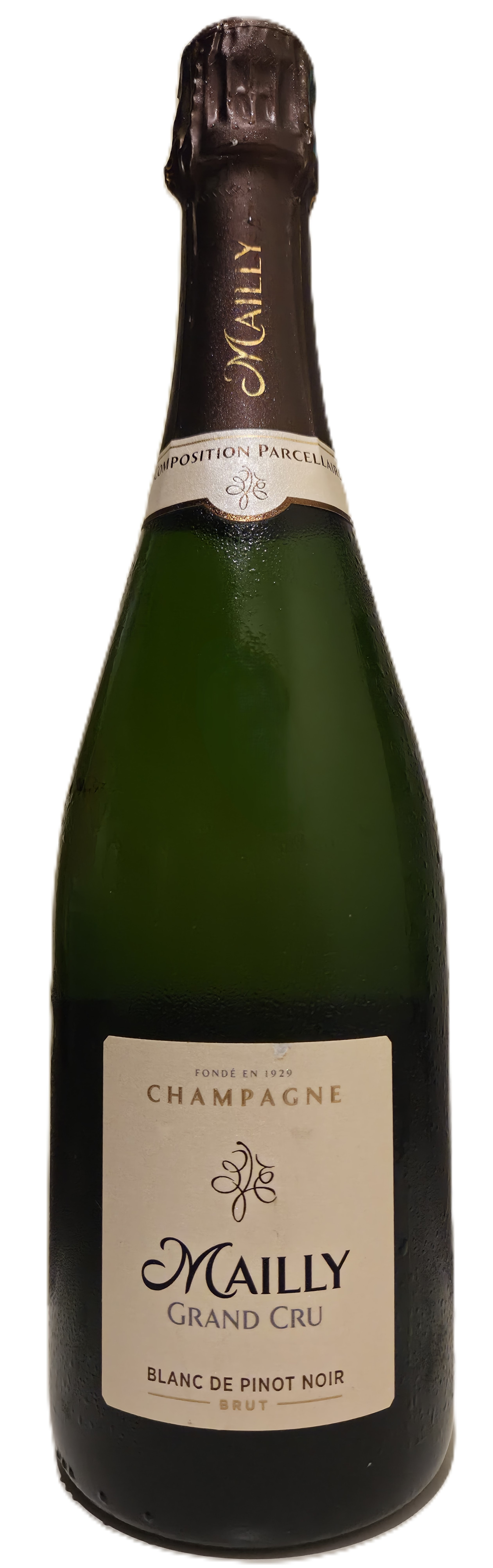
Blanc de Pinot Noir

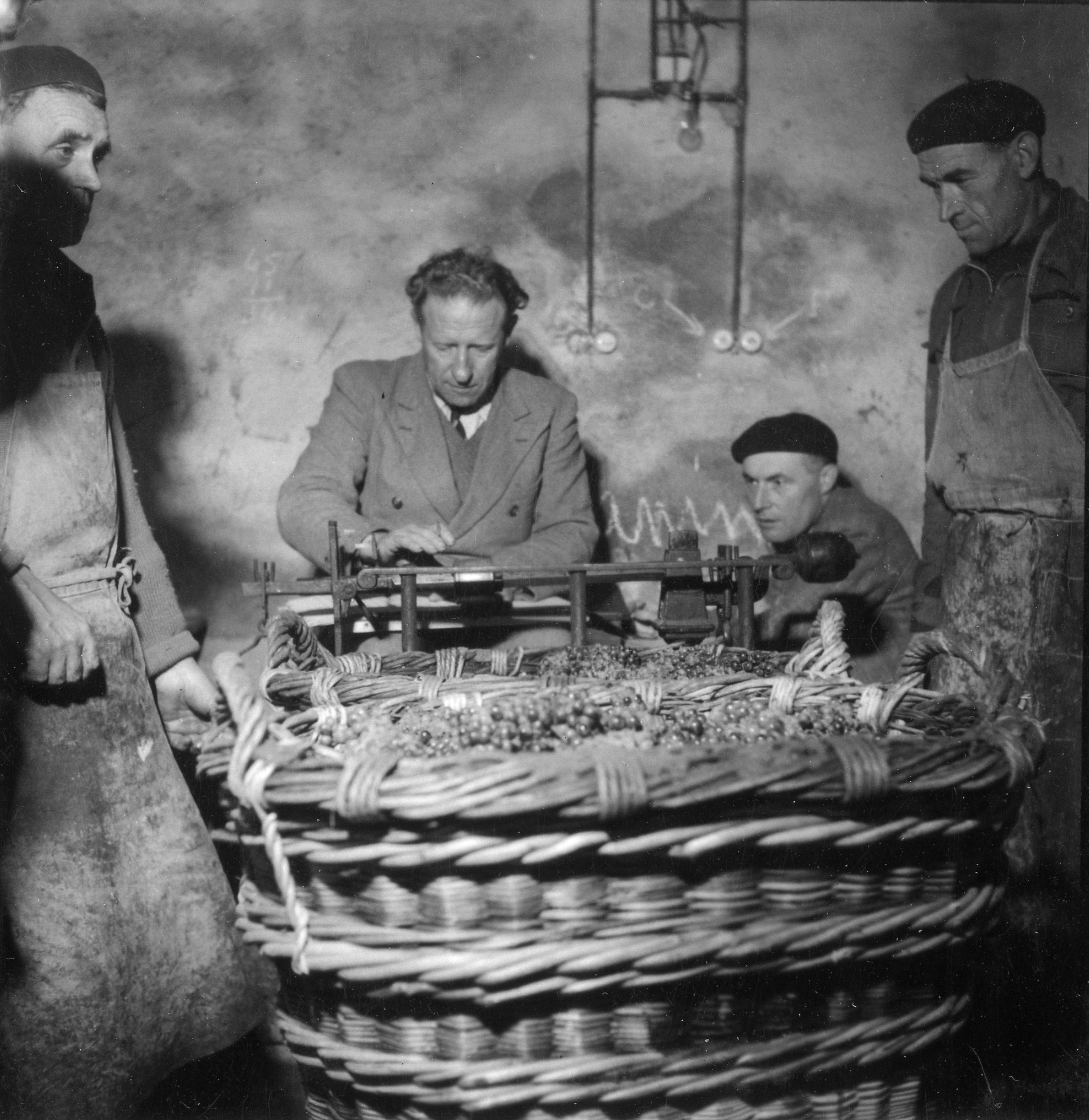

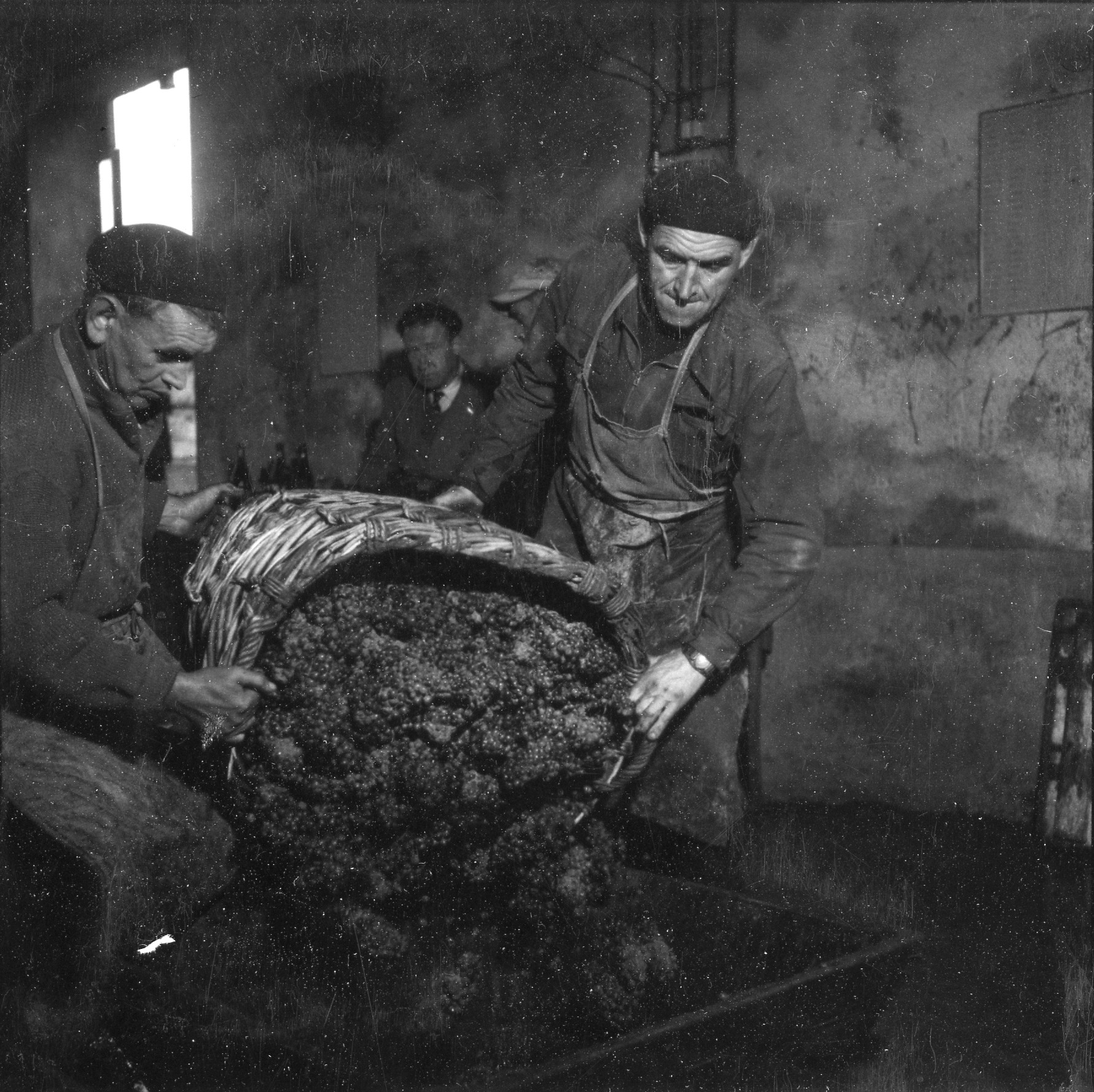

== Terroir ==
Mailly Champagne is located in the Montagne de Reims, 13 km south east of Reims.

Mailly Champagne was official ranked Grand Cru in 1920. Only 17 of the Champagne's 319 villages currently enjoy the Grand Cru status.

The vineyards of Mailly Champagne are spread on 288 ha composed of 35 named plots and divided in 600 small plots. The vines benefit from a chalk subsoil and the plots are mostly north, west facing.

Champagne Mailly Grand cru (through its members) manages 72 ha out of the 288 ha of the appellation. The vineyards are made of 75% Pinot Noir and 25% Chardonnay.

=== Vineyards management ===
Since 2014 Champagne Mailly Grand Cru alongside its growers has put in place sustainable methods of cultivation. Two environmental certification are followed: HEV ( High Environmental Value – launched by the French government ) and VDC (Sustainable winegrowing in Champagne designed by the CIVC)

In 2018 Champagne Mailly Grand Cru became the 1st coop of Champagne to obtain a collective certification HEV/VDC and the 3rd coop in France to obtain a collective HEV certification

Today 87% of the 72ha are certified.

== Winemaking ==
The grapes are harvested and vinified by parcel to respect their respective flavour profile. It then allows the winemaker to have a large choice of wines for its blending. This resulted into the launch of the range “ Composition parcellaire” in 2017

The reserve wines are the estate's particular forte. Champagne Mailly has a large selection of reserve wines from ten years of harvest.

== Artistic collaborations ==
In 2001-2002 and in 2007 the company collaborated with the architect Giovanni Pace to renovate its building.

The new building is a blend of modern and traditional design. Giovanni Pace focused on light and used materials such as blonde wood, stone and decorative wrought iron.

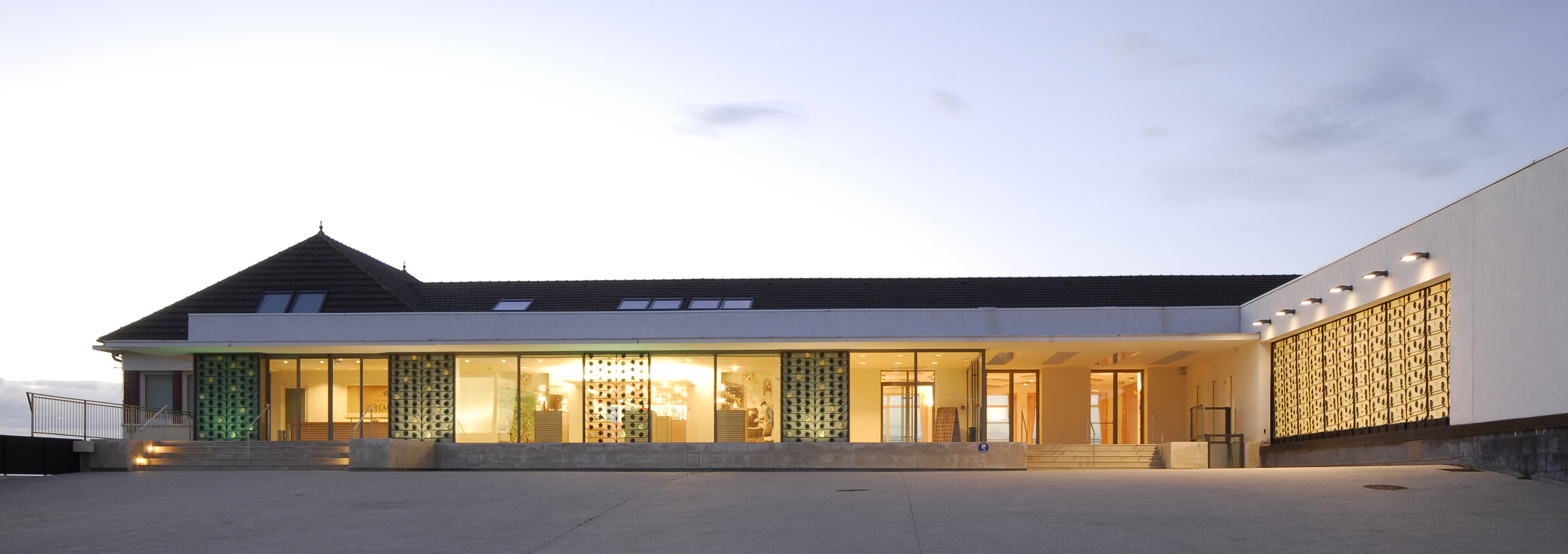

== The artistic range ==
Since 2000 Champagne Mailly has worked with contemporary artists to create unique metal presentation case.

2000: The Earth – with Bernard Pages 2005: Fire – with Florence Valay 2010: The Air – with Claude Viallat 2015 : Water – with Xavier Coulmier 2020: Nature – with Charles Neubach
