= Champagne Krug =

Brand of vintage Champagne

Krug
- Founded: 1843; 183 years ago
- Founder: Johann-Joseph Krug
- Headquarters: Reims, France
- Products: Champagne
- Owner: LVMH
- Website: krug.com

Founder Johann-Joseph Krug

Krug Champagne is a Champagne house founded by Joseph Krug in 1843. It is based principally in Reims, the main city in France's Champagne region and is one of the famous Champagne houses that formed part of the Grandes marques. Today the house is majority owned by the multinational conglomerate Moët Hennessy – Louis Vuitton (LVMH) whose portfolio includes other well known wine brands such as Moët & Chandon, Veuve Clicquot, Château d'Yquem and Ruinart. Despite LVMH's majority ownership, the Krug family is still actively involved in all the key decisions of the house but does not manage the day-to-day operations.

Moët Hennessy's Dom Pérignon is often compared to Krug, the latter being described as a "more intellectual wine" by Jancis Robinson.

== History ==
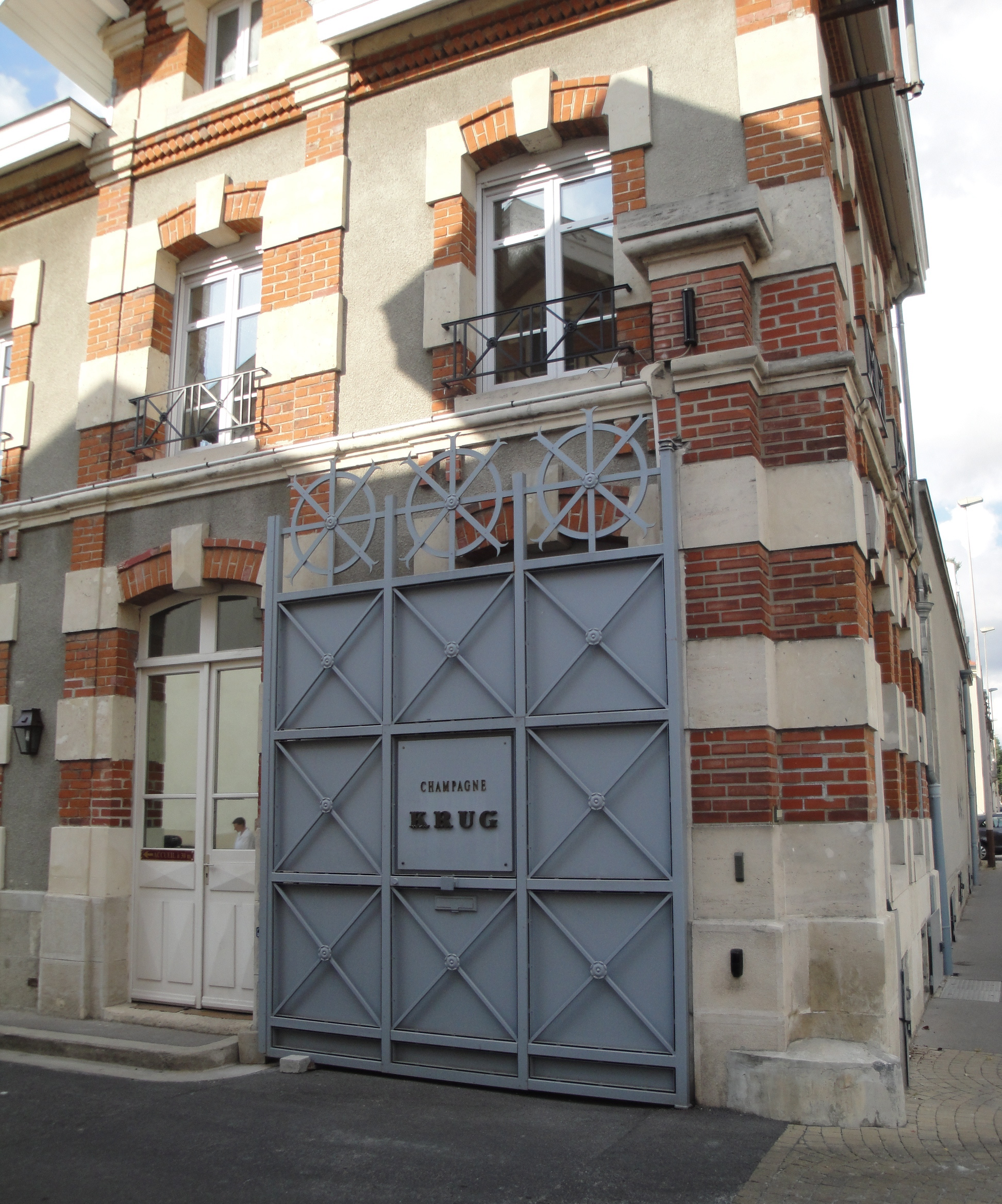
Entrance to Krug's facilities in Reims

Joseph Krug founded the House of Krug in 1843. He was born Johann-Joseph Krug, a butcher's son, in Mainz, on the Rhine, in 1800, at a time when the city was part of the Napoleonic Empire. Having dispensed with the name Johann, he left Mainz in 1824 and by 1834 he was in Paris. Germans were then much in demand in France as accountants and book-keepers and, as such, Joseph joined Champagne Jacquesson in Châlons-sur-Marne.

He spent eight years with Jacquesson, with his work taking him beyond accountancy as he went on the road around Europe testing the market and assessing criticism from wine sellers and customers. He learned about composition and taste so that by 1840 he already seems to have been blending Champagne for at least one other house. In 1841 he married Emma-Anne Jaunay, the daughter of a French hotelier based in London's Leicester Square, and an English mother. The following year their son, Paul Krug, was born. In 1842 came the move to Reims and, following a year of negotiations, Krug et Cie. was founded in 1843 with sleeping partner Hyppolite de Vivès. Joseph was also fluent in French, English and German and spoke some Russian, putting the company in position to exploit key overseas markets.

Joseph died in 1866 and was succeeded by his son Paul Krug, who had been trained by his father for the business in France and abroad. Joseph had laid the foundations and under the supervision of Paul the House was established as a grande marque. By the 1880s the prestige of Krug was acknowledged in the United Kingdom, then the primary overseas market for Champagne. In 1866 the House moved into the premises in Rue Coquebert, in Reims, that it still occupies.

After Paul's death in 1910, he was succeeded by his son, Joseph Krug II. However, during World War I Joseph II was taken prisoner and his wife Jeanne played a key role in the House, at a time when the Western Front divided the region between the Allies and the Germans. After the war, Joseph II's slow recovery led to his nephew Jean Seydoux becoming joint manager in 1924. In that decade, too, the Krug 1926 and 1928 vintages were created, which have been considered by critics to be amongst the greatest Champagnes. The lawyer and wine writer Maurice Healey observed in 1940 that "Krug holds my allegiance as the king of them all; my recollection does not go beyond the Krug 1919, but that was truly an excellent wine. And Krug 1928 must be the best wine made in the present century."

By the mid-1930s, Paul Krug II, the son of Joseph II, was active in the business and would go on to become head of the House from 1959 to 1977. His father died in 1967, by which time he was, according to Patrick Forbes, "one of the most popular and respected figures in the Champagne district".

In 1962 Henri Krug, the son of Paul II, joined the management, as did his brother Remi three years later. Their arrival was followed by a series of innovations, including extensions in the range of Champagnes. Henri Krug became president of the family company in 1977. In 1979, for the first time, a graduate winemaker joined the House. In January 1999, Krug was sold by Rémy Cointreau to LVMH. In 2002, Henri Krug stepped down, naming his son Olivier to replace him. By 2007, the brothers, while remaining on the tasting committee, had stepped down from day-to-day responsibilities. In 2009 Olivier Krug, the son of Henri, became House director.

In 2022, Ryuchi Sakamoto released a symphony, "Suite for Krug in 2008", about his experiences tasting Krug champagne in 2008.

== Champagnes ==
Display bottle of Grande Cuvée, Krug's non-vintage brut

Krug produces mainly Krug Grande Cuvée, supplemented by a non-vintage rosé, a vintage blanc, a vintage blanc de blancs from the Clos du Mesnil in the Cotes de Blancs, a vintage blanc de noirs from the Clos d'Ambonnay and older vintages released as Krug Collection series.

On the nose, Krug is characterized by toasted, grilled, pastry or almond notes born from at least 6 years of ageing sur lies. On the palate, Krug is characterized by notes of fresh fruit, particularly citrus, and a freshness linked to grape selection. Krug does not suppress malolactic fermentation nor does it provoke it, with the majority of its wines not undergoing the process. Its wines are almost invariably dry (never more than 6.5g/L residual sugar).

The Krug line-up of Champagnes currently includes:

- Krug Grande Cuvée
- Krug Rosé
- Krug Vintage 2000, Krug Vintage 2003 and Krug Vintage 2004
- Krug Collection 1989
- Krug Clos du Mesnil 2000 and Krug Clos du Mesnil 2003
- Krug Clos d'Ambonnay 1998 and Krug Clos d'Ambonnay 2000

Krug Grande Cuvée (non-vintage) A blend of over 120 wines coming from ten or more different vintages – some up to fifteen years in age – and three grape varieties (Pinot noir, Chardonnay and Pinot Meunier) from numerous vineyards. It is re-created on a yearly basis. It is distinguished by its deep golden color and fine bubbles. In total, about twenty years are required to create a bottle of Krug Grande Cuvée, including at least six years during which the bottle sits in the Krug cellars.

Krug Rosé is described by the House as a gastronomic Champagne. The fruit of an experiment carried out by Henri and Rémi Krug in the 1970s, the first bottles of Krug Rosé were presented for tasting in 1983, 140 years after the company's founding. Krug Rosé is a blend of three grape varieties, several different vintages from Krug's library of 150 reserve wines and a skin-fermented Pinot noir wine which gives it its color and unique flavor. Krug Rosé spends at least five years in the House's cellars. It is re-created on a yearly basis.

Krug Vintage is, according to the House, "not the selection of the best wines of a particular year, but rather the expression of that year according to Krug." Composed only of wines from a single year, Krug Vintage sits in Krug's cellars for at least a decade before release. The 2000 vintage was born of the House's desire to create a vintage for the last year of the millennium.

In the early 1980s, Krug introduced Krug Collection, an extension of Krug Vintage, consisting of bottles that have been kept in the House's cellars in Reims for at least ten additional years to allow the development of second-life aromas and flavours. The current offering is Krug Collection 1989. It is the first vintage from the trilogy of 1988, 1989 and 1990 to be released as part of Krug Collection, preceding 1988 upon the House's decision.

Krug Clos du Mesnil comes from a single plot (known as a clos in French) of Chardonnay: a 1.84-hectare vineyard protected by walls since 1698 in the centre of Mesnil-sur-Oger, a village in the Champagne region of France. It comes from a single year and is kept in Krug's cellars for over a decade.

Krug Clos d'Ambonnay also comes from a single year, and its grapes from a single 0.68-hectare walled plot of Pinot noir in the heart of Ambonnay, another village in France's Champagne region that plays a key role in Champagne making. Bottles are aged for over twelve years in Krug's cellars and are rare due to the small size of the vineyard.

== Winemaking ==
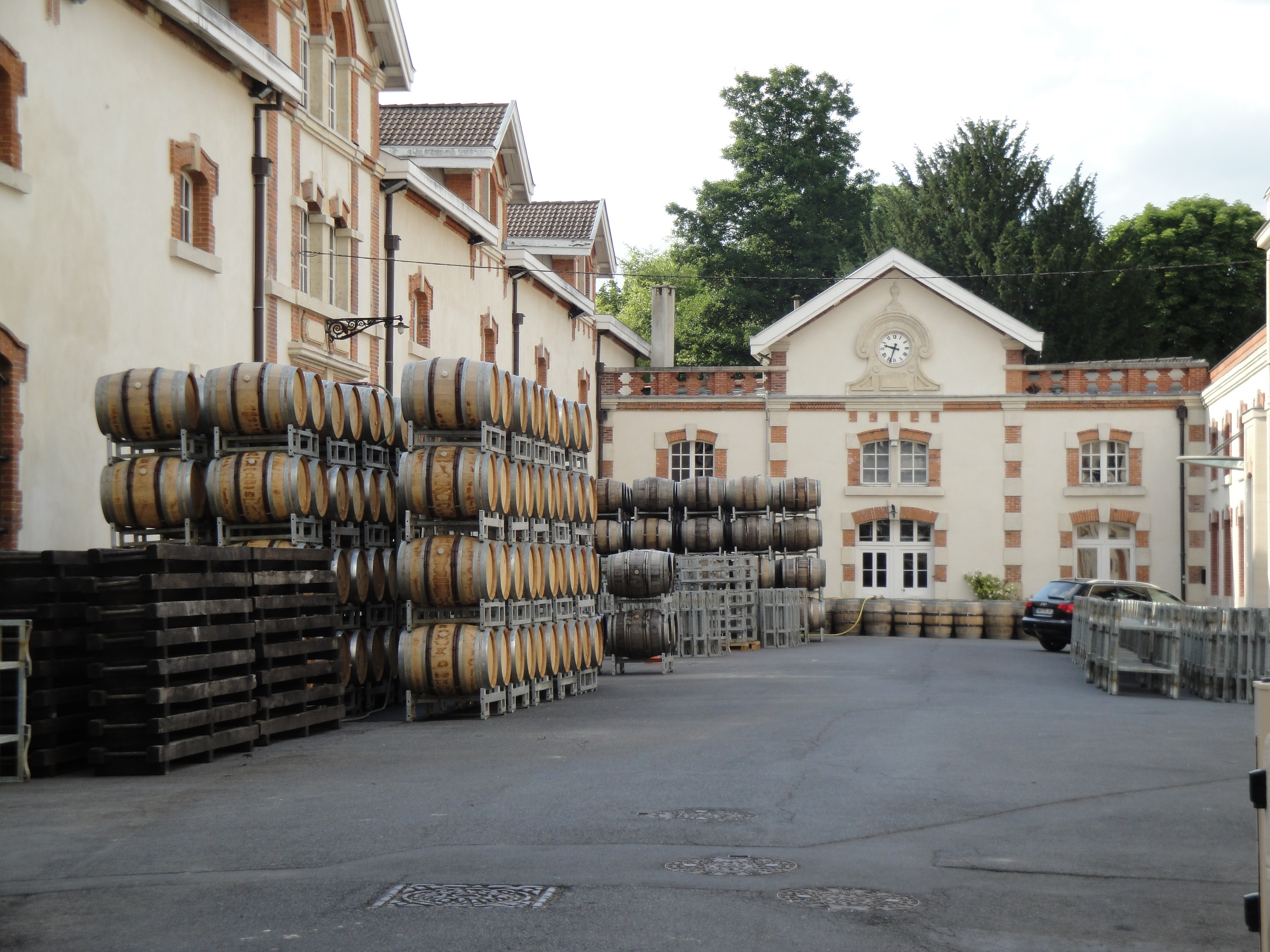
Barrels stored in Krug's courtyard waiting to be used

Krug utilizes all three Champagne varieties in their wines, Chardonnay, Pinot noir, and Pinot Meunier. For their two single vineyard vintages, Krug Clos du Mesnil is made in the Blanc de blancs style, completely from Chardonnay, while Krug Clos d'Ambonnay is made exclusively from Pinot noir.

The winemaking process at Krug begins with the individual selection of each plot of vines and continues with the initial vinification of the grapes from each plot in wooden casks, which – unlike tanks – are small enough to give the House the flexibility to hold a single plot's wine and therefore avoid pre-mature blending. In the event that a plot's wine is not up to the required level, it will leave the house as a bulk, never again to be labelled a Krug base wine.

=== Pressing and initial fermentation ===
Immediately following the harvest, the grapes are pressed close to Krug's plots, with this first grape juice kept for 24 hours in a vat in preparation for the fermentation stage.

The pressing from each plot is vinified separately. A pressing contains 4,000 kg of grapes and yields 20.5 hectolitres of first juice (the "cuvée"), which is poured into twelve oak casks chosen at random. Once fermentation is complete, the eleventh and twelfth casks are used to top up the other ten casks to protect the new wines from oxidation. For fifteen days, each cask is topped up with wine from the same plot.

Krug uses small 205-litre oak casks tailor-made from trees that are more than two centuries old in the forests of Hautes Futaies in Central France. Krug never use these casks immediately; during the first two or three years, they receive only second and third grape juices, with the goal of "tanning" the casks through the fermentation process, ridding them naturally of their woody aromas, making them well-seasoned and organoleptically inert. The average age of Krug oak casks is 20 years. They are retired after approximately 40 years of use.

During the summer preceding the harvest, casks are regularly watered to humidify the wood, a process Krug deems essential as its wines are not wood-aged and its casks are therefore empty for eight to nine months of the year.

The wines remain in the casks for several weeks. During this period, clarification occurs naturally from the cool temperature of the cellar given the coming winter, as does a micro-oxygenation process from the use of natural containers, making the wine more resistant to oxygen over time. Finally, between December and January, the wine is drawn off into small stainless-steel vats. From here, depending on the decisions of Krug's tasting committee, the wines will either contribute to that year's assemblage or be stored in steel vats in the House's library of 150 reserve wines to be used in the blend of a future Krug Grande Cuvée and Krug Rosé.

=== Tasting committee and assemblage ===
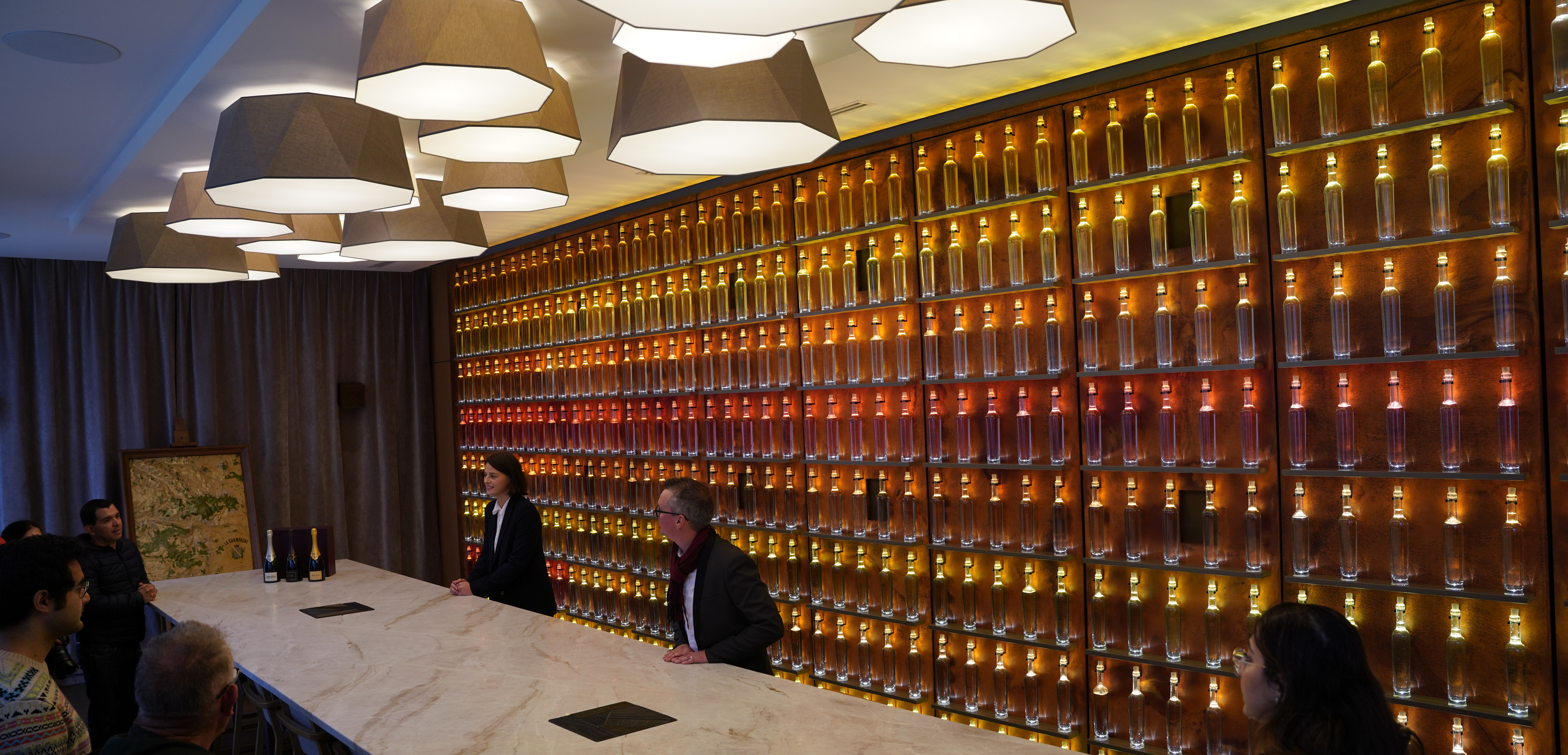
Tasting committee and assemblage room

Over a period of five months in autumn and winter, the base wines and the reserve wines are tasted by the members of the tasting committee, composed of five permanent members (Olivier Krug, representing the sixth generation of the Krug family; Eric Lebel, Krug cellar master and winemaker; Julie Cavil and Raphaele Leon-Grillon, who make up the Krug winemaking team; and Laurent Halbin, head of winemaking operations) and two members present according to their availability (Rémi and Maggie Henriquez, President and CEO of Krug).

At each session, between 15 and 18 samples are blind tasted, commented on and scored. During the tasting period, wine from each plot is carefully referenced, tasted at least two or three times and given a mark out of 20. By the end of December, the tasting committee establishes what Krug calls a "character sketch" of the year and begins tasting the 150 reserve wines from which it will draw the missing elements needed to re-create the character of Krug Grande Cuvée year after year.

In the spring, a second tasting session of wines from the year reveals how the wines have evolved over the winter period. Eric Lebel then proposes up to three blends for the Champagnes of that year, with each member of the committee having one vote. Once the blend has been decided, the House prepares for bottling which takes place once a year between April and May.

=== Cellars ===
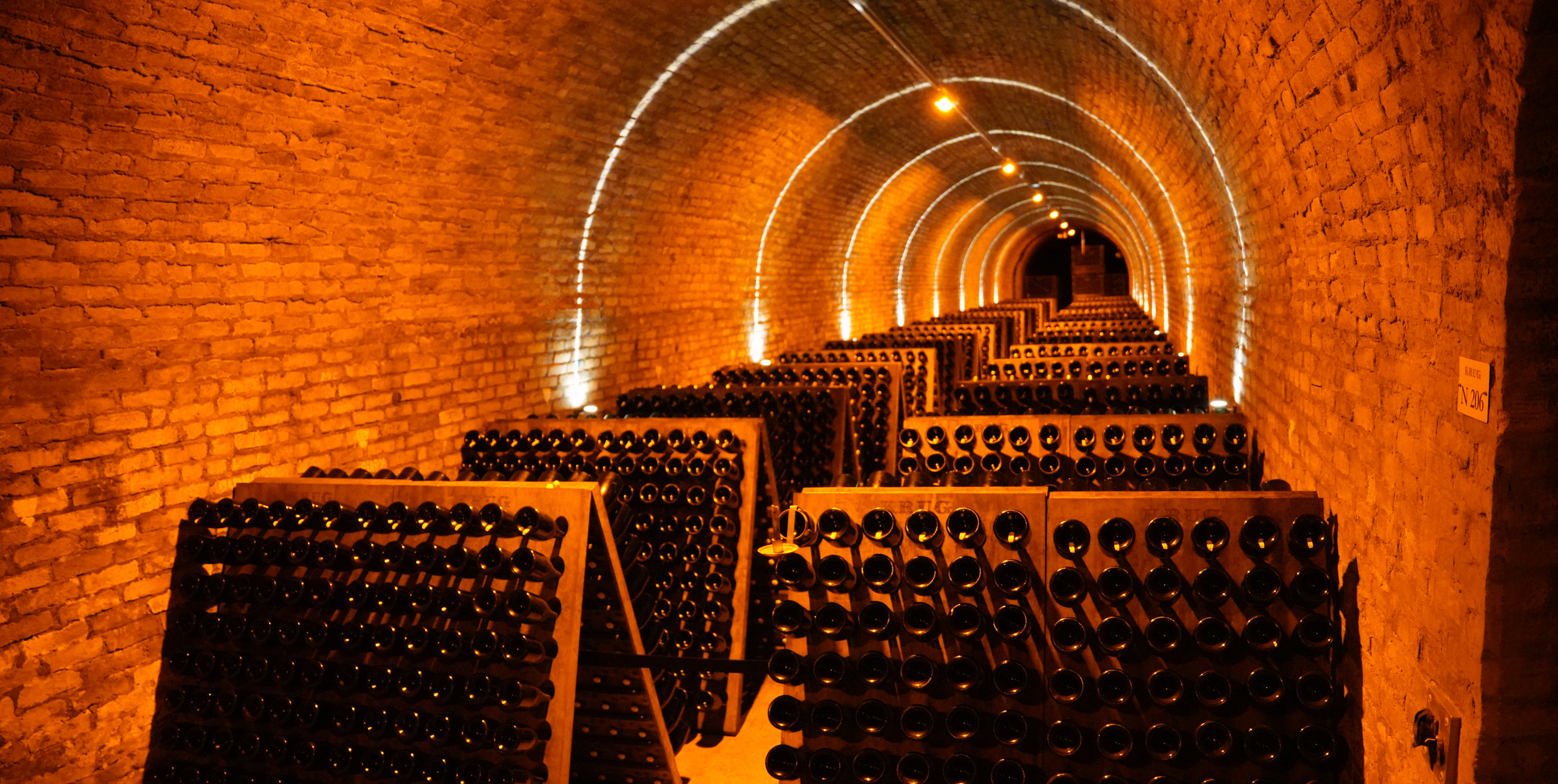
Cellars

All Krug Champagnes are bottled during a single session, thirty weeks after the harvest. Once bottled, they are kept in the House's cellars in Reims. Krug characterizes this final stage of its winemaking process by very extended aging on the lees. Indeed, Krug's main champagne, Krug Grande Cuvée stays in the cellars for at least six years, Krug Rosé for five years, and Krug Vintage, Krug Clos du Mesnil and Krug Clos d'Ambonnay for at least ten years.

== Vineyards ==
The House owns 30% of the vineyards that produce its wines – a relatively high percentage in Champagne-making – with 20 hectares of vines in Ambonnay, Aÿ, Le Mesnil and Trépail. It obtains the rest of its grapes from long-term contract growers for a total of 250 plots selected from the 270,000 listed in France's Champagne region. Seventy to one hundred winegrowers currently work with Krug, providing 65% to 70% of the company's grapes. Additionally, because Krug preserves the individual character of each wine, vinegrowers are able to taste each of the wines selected from their plots and follow their evolution over time in the event that their wines are selected as Krug reserve wines.

=== Clos du Mesnil ===
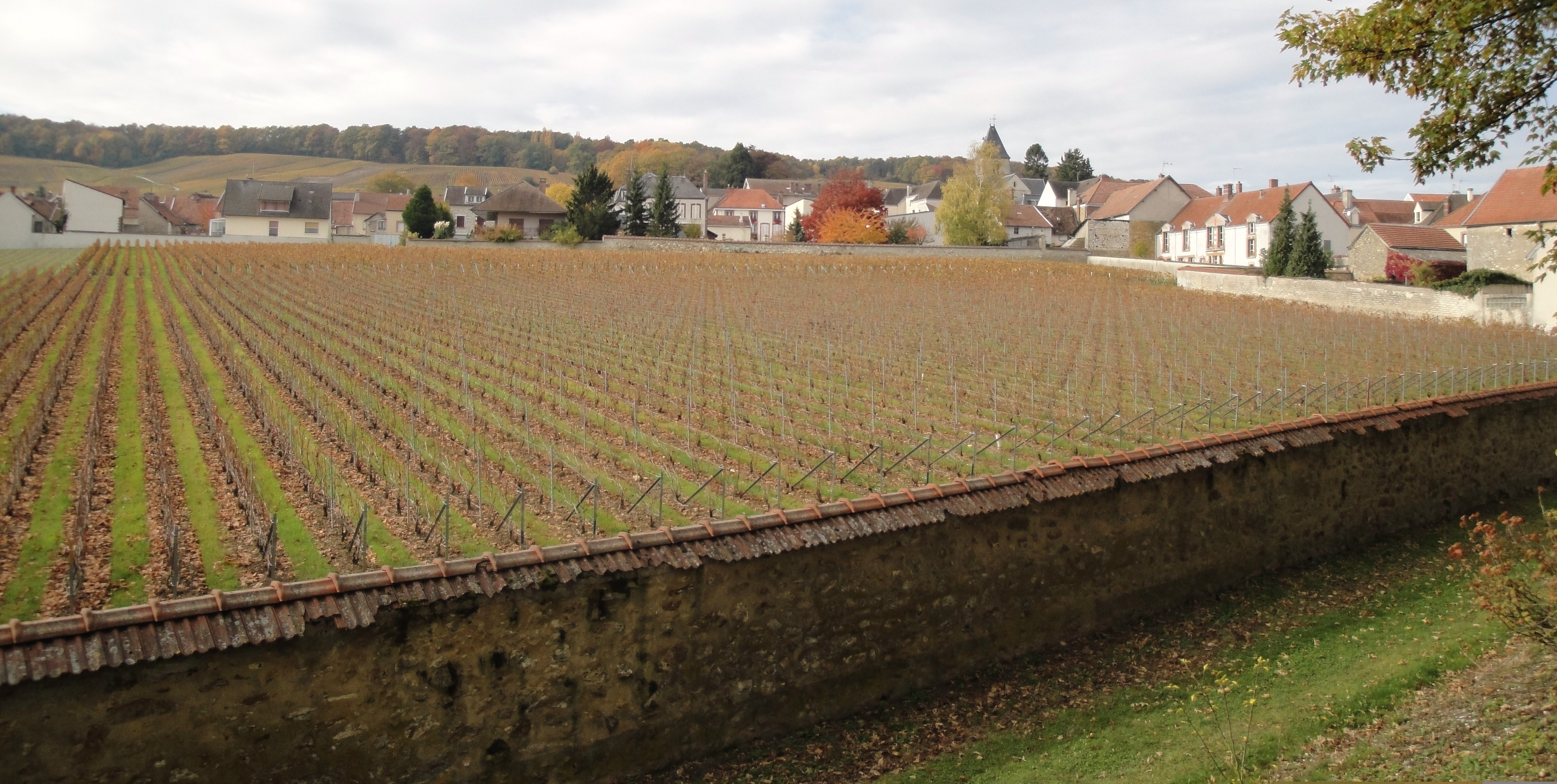
Clos du Mesnil

In 1971, Rémi and Henri Krug purchased six hectares of vines around the renowned Chardonnay village of Mesnil-sur-Oger. Upon their initial visit, they discovered that their purchase included a walled vineyard of a mere 1.85 acres located in the heart of the village and bearing an inscription: "In the year 1698, this wall was built by Claude Jannin and Pierre Dehée Metoen and in the same year the vines were planted by Gaspard Jannin, son of Claude."

Krug stresses that the wall and unusual location in the center of the village create a micro-climate that accords a unique character to its grapes. It was for this reason that the House was inspired to devote a Champagne to a single plot for the first time in its history, resulting in Krug Clos du Mesnil 1979, presented in 1986.

=== Clos d'Ambonnay ===
Following Krug Clos du Mesnil, Rémi and Henri Krug turned their attention to Pinot noir grapes, in particular those from Ambonnay, a grand cru known for its Pinot noir that had been a main source of supply for Krug since its founding. In 1991, after seven years of searching, they found a walled plot of just 0.68 hectares on the edge the village, on the south-eastern slope of the Montagne de Reims. Like the Clos du Mesnil, the plot was also surrounded by protective walls, which date back to the year 1766, although in this case the vineyard itself was not planted until the 20th century. Krug purchased the land in 1994 and released its first vintage – Krug Clos d'Ambonnay 1995 – in 2007.

== Marketing ==
LVMH, Paris, selected ceft and company new york, to create a global communications campaign for Krug Champagne. The campaign featured Jean Nouvel, Anjelica Huston, Buzz Aldrin, and David Lynch. The campaign won a gold award at the World Luxury Awards in Monaco.

=== Krug Lovers ===
In 2011, Krug launched a community of Krug aficionados who share a love for Krug. The House-created program offers a platform for stories, inspirations and favorite getaways and is open to the public via registration on the Krug.com website. The program features member profiles and their collaborations with Krug, such as a drawing created by Italian illustrator Gianluca Biscalchin following Krug's Grand Musée de Beaux-Arts event, the Krug Room at the Mandarin Oriental Hong Kong from chef Uwe Opocensky, or a series of photographs by Dutch artist Scarlett Hooft Graafland, commissioned by Krug.

=== Krug ID ===
Since summer 2011, all bottles of Krug Champagne feature a KRUG ID located on the left-hand side of the back label. This six-digit number – with the first digit indicating the quarter in which the bottle left Krug's cellars and the following two digits indicating the year – serves as a reference for wine collectors and a mobile application to further information about that particular bottle.

For Krug Grande Cuvées, the KRUG ID reveals the oldest and youngest wines that went into the making of the bottle, as well as the details and challenges of that particular season. For other Krug cuvees, the KRUG ID recounts the story of the year, the objectives behind the creation of the specific bottle or the behavior of the plots. The Krug application also pairs different Krug champagnes with types of music.

== Burning Man controversy ==
In 2011, Krug, with the Silkstone events agency, shot a marketing campaign at the Burning Man festival in Nevada. Festival-goers were told they were attending a birthday party, but were filmed and photographed as part of this campaign. The Burning Man organization posted an exposé on their blog, rebuking Krug for breaking many rules of the festival both in letter and spirit, including product placement, photography for commercial gain and leaving behind a mess. Members of the Burning Man community denounced the campaign and Krug in various social media.

== See also ==
- List of Champagne houses
