= Jacquesson =

Coordinates: 49.0652868°N 3.963701°E

Jacquesson & Fils is a Champagne producer based in the Dizy region of Champagne. The house was founded in Châlons-sur-Marne in 1798 by Memmie Jacquesson. The house makes the claim it is the oldest independent Champagne house.

== History ==
The fame of the house grew following the rumour that it was a favourite of Napoleon, who bestowed upon the house a gold medal for its fine cellars. The Champagne house Juglar was absorbed into Jacquesson in 1829. By 1867 annual sales of Jacquesson bottles had reached 1,000,000, but a period of decline followed the death of Adolphe Jacquesson, inventor of the muselet, when the descendants ceased to continue the family business, and ownership changed hands over several decades, until in 1974 when it was bought by Jean Chiquet. In March 2022, the brand was partly bought by Artemis Domaines before completing a full purchase at the end of the year.

== Present day ==
Today it is directed by Jean Garandeau with brothers Jean-Hervé and Laurent Chiquet still supplying grapes from their own vineyards. Methods have changed to be organic, fermentation in oak is increased, new vineyards are bought in, but production still is limited to around 350,000 bottles per year. Revue du Vin de France in Les Meilleurs Vin de France awarded the house three stars out of 3 in its 2010 edition.

Jacquesson vineyards are located in the Grand Cru villages of Aÿ, Avize and Oiry and in the Premier Cru villages of Dizy, Hautvillers and Mareuil-sur-Aÿ, with approximately 15% of the fruit sourced from growers in these villages as well as the Grand Cru village of Chouilly and the Premier Cru village Cumières.

The main wine is a numbered cuvée, for example Cuvée 733, which is a blend of 2005 vintage with 30-40% older reserve wines. Other wines are vintages, the best known from Avize Grand Cru and single vineyard wines from Ay, Dizy and Avize. All wines are characterized by elegance and minerality, due to an extremely low dosage (usually 2–5 grams per litre or 2.0–5.0 ounces per cubic foot). On backlabel are indicated number of bottles produced, month of disgorging and dosage.

== Föglö wreck ==
In July 2010, 168 bottles of Champagne were found on the Föglö wreck near Åland in the Baltic Sea by Finnish diver Christian Ekström. Initial analyses indicated there were at least two types of bottles from two different houses: Veuve Clicquot in Reims and the long-defunct Champagne house Juglar which was merged into Jacquesson in 1829.

== See also ==
- List of Champagne houses
