= Degerby, Föglö =

Degerby
- Village
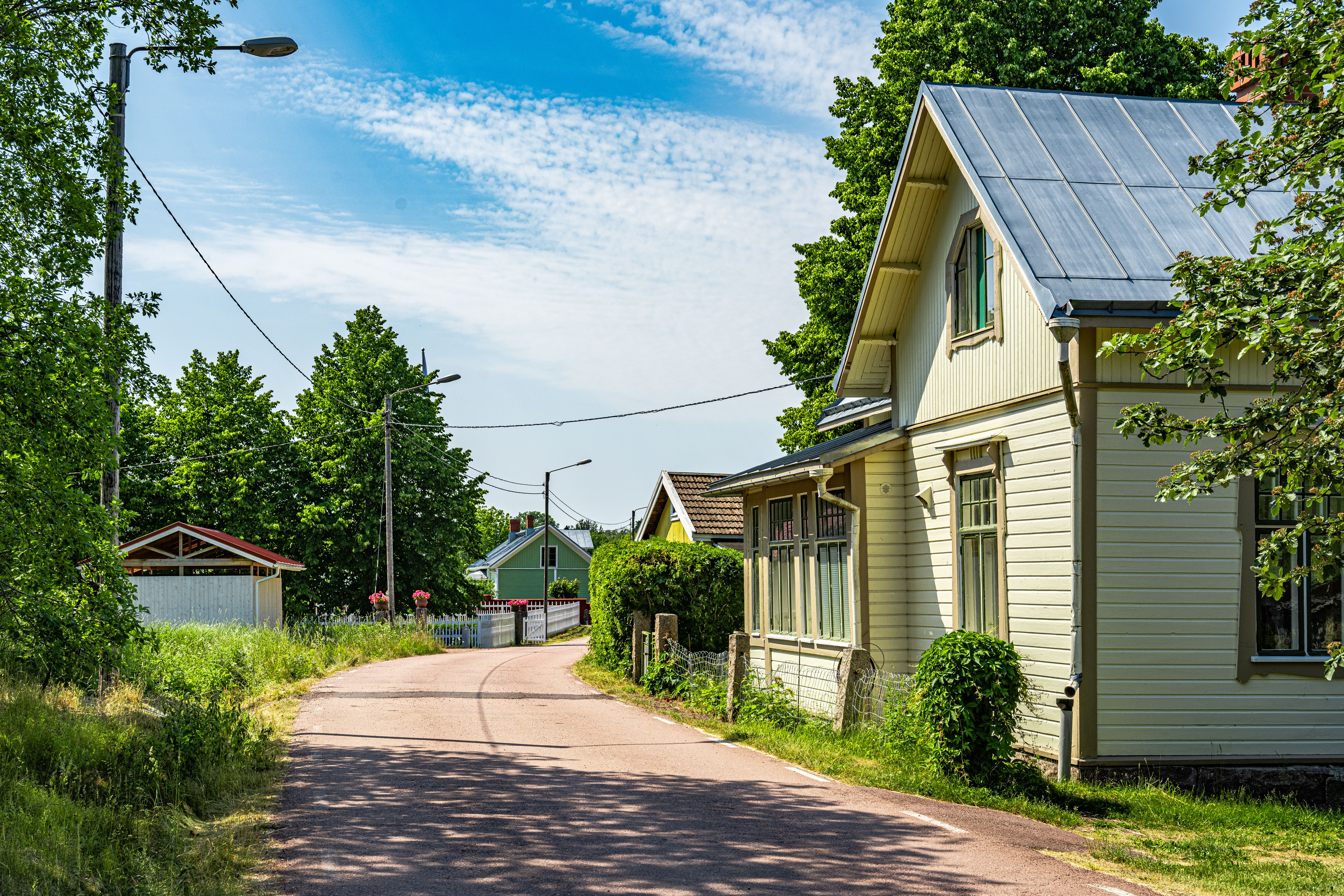
- A village center

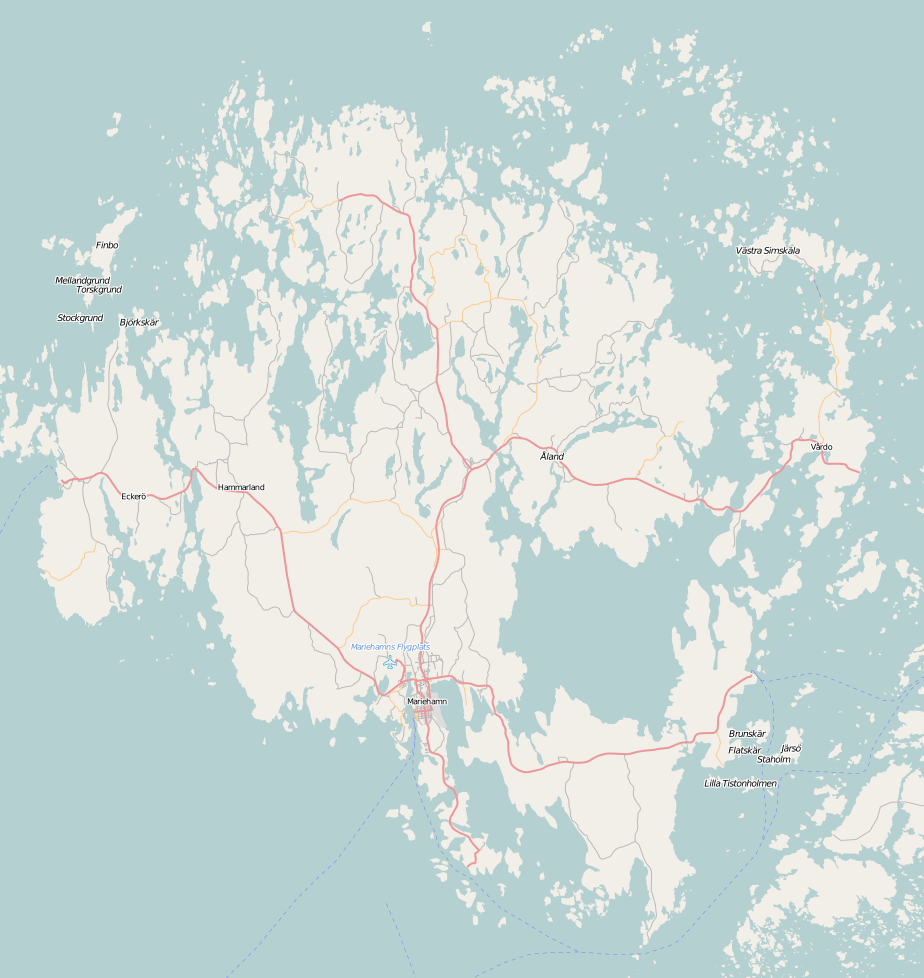
- Location within Åland
- Country: Finland
- Region: Åland
- Municipality: Föglö

Population (2014)
  - Total: 187
- Postal code: 22710

Degerby is a village and the administrative center of the municipality of Föglö, Åland. The village was the center of the Åland archipelago until the founding of Mariehamn in 1861 and was the largest village in terms of population until the 1920s. Degerby is known for its sea captain's houses. On the outskirts of the village is the Enigheten tavern, founded in the 17th century, which has also served as a courthouse. There is a frequent ferry connection from Degerby to Svinö, the main island of Åland.

In 2014, the village had 187 inhabitants.
