= Oiry =

- Commune
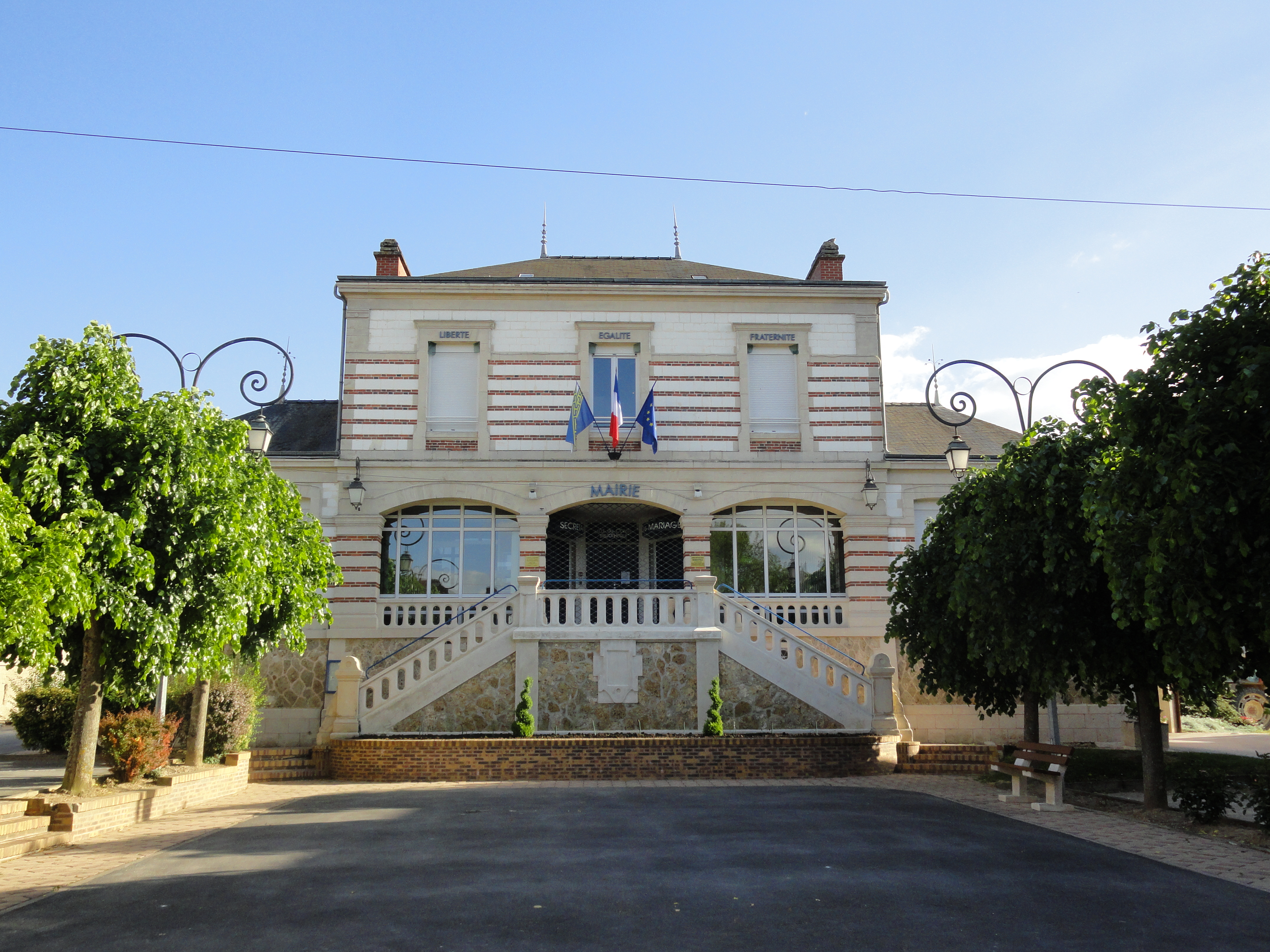
- The town hall of Oiry

- Coat of arms
- Location of Oiry
- Location within France Location within Grand Est
- Coordinates: 49°01′28″N 4°03′04″E
- Country: France
- Region: Grand Est
- Department: Marne
- Arrondissement: Épernay
- Canton: Épernay-2
- Intercommunality: CA Épernay, Coteaux et Plaine de Champagne

Government
  - Mayor (2020–2026): Dominique Charlot
- Area^{1}: 10.76 km^{2} (4.15 sq mi)
- Elevation: 77 m (253 ft)
- Population (2023): 884
  - Density: 82.2/km^{2} (213/sq mi)
- Time zone: UTC+01:00 (CET)
  - Summer (DST): UTC+02:00 (CEST)
- INSEE/Postal code: 51413 /51530
- ^{1} French Land Register data, which excludes lakes, ponds, glaciers > 1 km^{2} (0.386 sq mi or 247 acres) and river estuaries.

Oiry (French pronunciation: [waʁi]) is a commune in the Marne department in north-eastern France.

== Champagne ==
The village's vineyards are located in the Côte de Blancs subregion of Champagne, and are classified as Grand Cru (100%) in the Champagne vineyard classification.

== See also ==
- Communes of the Marne department
- Classification of Champagne vineyards
