= Wine Location Specialist =

In a collaboration between the CIVC (Comité Interprofessionnel du Vin de Champagne) and the IVDP (Instituto dos Vinhos do Douro e Porto) through the Center for Wine Origins, the Wine Location Specialist or WLS program was initiated in July 2010. Approved sommeliers and beverage directors apply to take the test after extensive self-guided study of two of the world’s most famous wines, Champagne and Port, and the regions in which they are produced.

The book provided to pre-approved participants was written by Master of Wine, Sandy Block. Exam takers must make a minimum of 80% on the multiple choice test as well as meet minimum requirements on the essay portion of this demanding test. Only 19 wine professionals in the United States have been awarded the Wine Location Specialist Certificate with the first class. The January 2011 class of 25 wine professionals represent all facets of the wine industry. .

This certification means that those who carry the WLS designation after their name are accredited by the CIVC and the IVDP to lead wine education seminars, wine-tastings and dinners specific to the Champagne and Port regions.

== List of Wine Location Specialists ==
- Michael Cheatham,
- Al Fini,
- Emily Adams,
- Luiz Alberto,
- Thomas Anderer,
- Paul Ashe,
- Richard Auffrey,
- Kent Benson,
- Sandra Crittenden,
- Carolyn Dougharty,
- Stephanie Baden,
- Joan Fedus,
- Alicia Towns Franken,
- Tom Firth,
- Annette Hanami,
- Pamela Heiligenthal,
- Gabriel Key,
- James King,
- Michael Maletta,
- Lance Mayhew,
- Suzanne McGrath,
- Kerri Robinson,
- Yoko Sawyer,
- Rick Schofield,
- Yashar Shayan,
- David Speer,
- Brandon Tebbe
- Megan Yelenosky
