= Comité Interprofessionnel du vin de Champagne =

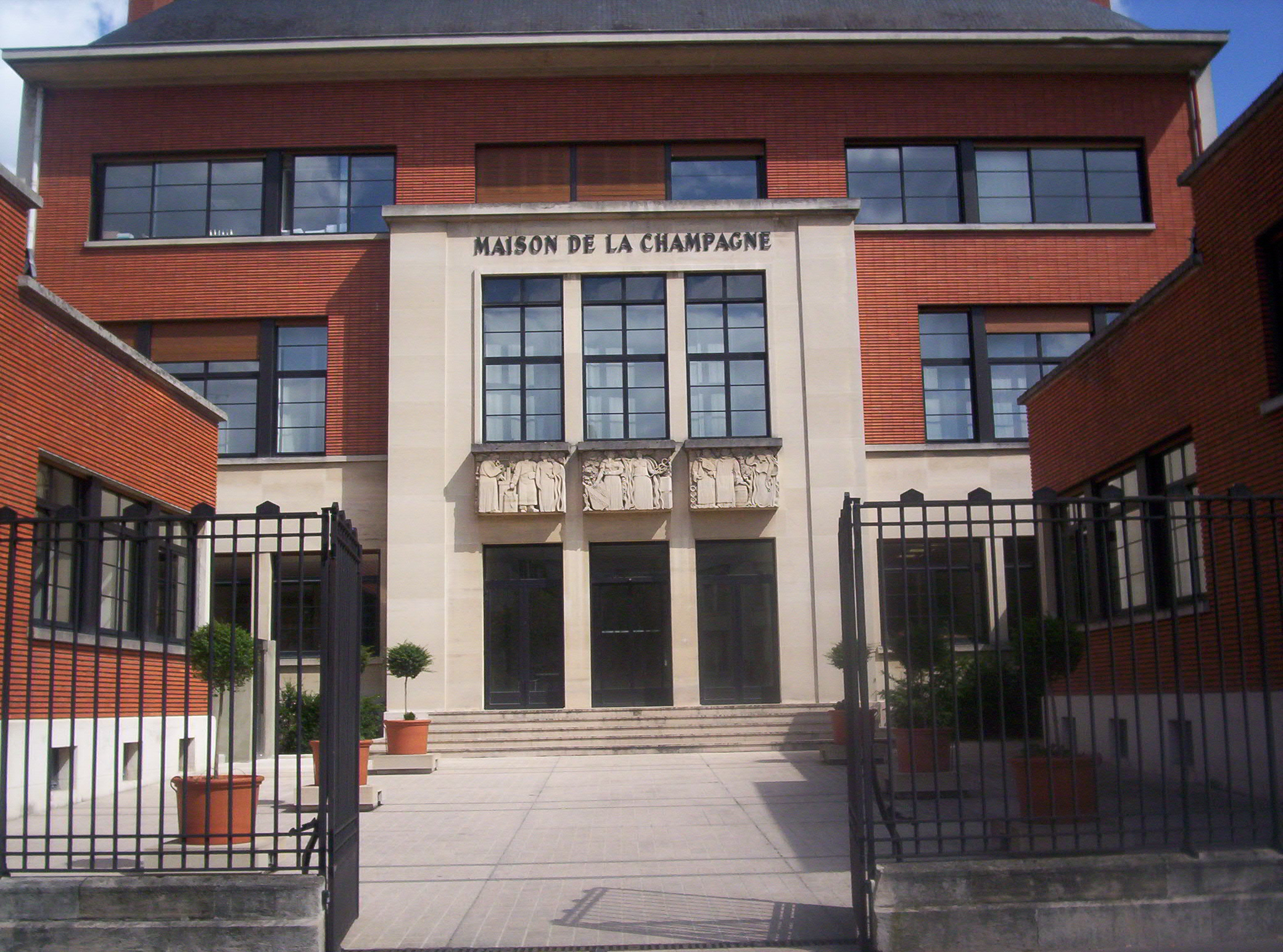
Maison de la Champagne, SIege de CIVC

Le Comité Interprofessionnel du vin de Champagne (CIVC) is an organisation grouping the actors of the Champagne production and trade—growers, cooperatives and merchants—under the direction of the government. It is charged with organizing and controlling the production, distribution, and promotion of the wines of Champagne as well as conducting research. Until 1990 it set the price of grapes and still intervenes to regulate the size of the harvest and to limit the production of wine in order to maintain market prices.

One of the prominent activities of CIVC is to safeguard the name Champagne, which is a protected designation of origin as well as a very valuable trademark. CIVC is quick to resort to litigation at any non-authorized use of the Champagne name. CIVC also operates activities in other countries to educate consumers and to have national representation for the protection of the Champagne name. An example is the Champagne Bureau (formerly the Office of Champagne) in the United States.

== History ==
CIVC was established on April 12, 1941, while Germany was occupying Champagne and other parts of France during World War II. Since the occupation meant requisitions and strict control of trade, both by the occupational power and the Vichy regime, Champagne producers saw a need to present a unified front to the Germans. Robert-Jean de Vogüé, who was heading Moët & Chandon, took the initiative and became the person who was appointed by CIVC to negotiate with the Germans.

CIVC has served as a model for the Comité Interprofessionnel organisations created in other French wine regions, and also for the Consorzio of Italy and the Consejo Regulador of Spain.

The Comité was a civil plaintiff in a trial exposing human trafficking among grape harvest workers.

== See also ==
- French wine
- Champagne Riots
- Wine Location Specialist
