= Blant =

Blant is a French and English surname. Notable people with the surname include:

- Colin Blant, English footballer
- Julien Le Blant, French painter
- Edmond-Frédéric Le Blant, French archaeologist and historian

== Other ==
- Blant Fjell

== See also ==
- Blantyre (disambiguation)
