= Ruinart (disambiguation) =

Ruinart is the oldest established Champagne house, exclusively producing champagne since 1729.

Ruinart may also refer to:

- Thierry Ruinart (1657–1709), French Benedictine monk and scholar
- Paul Ruinart (1876–1959), French racing cyclist and sporting director
- Nicolas Irénée Ruinart (1697–1769), French draper and entrepreneur
