= Rockridge =

Rockridge or Rock Ridge may refer to:

== Places ==
=== United States ===
by state

- Rockridge, Oakland, California
  - Rockridge (BART station), transit station
- Rock Ridge, Connecticut, a section of the town of Greenwich
- Rockridge, Georgia
- Rock Ridge (Monterey, Massachusetts), listed on the National Register of Historic Places
- Rock Ridge (New Jersey), a lake
- Rockridge, West Virginia
- Rockridge Press

=== Canada ===
- Rock Ridge, Manitoba, a community

== Schools ==
- Rockridge Secondary School, West Vancouver, British Columbia, Canada
- Rockridge High School, Illinois, United States

== Other ==
- Rock Ridge, a CD-ROM filesystem extension
- Rock Ridge Music, an independent music label
- The Rockridge Institute, a now-defunct progressive think tank formerly located in Berkeley, California
- Rock Ridge, a fictional town in the comedy film Blazing Saddles
- Rock Ridge (Monterey, Massachusetts), a house on the National Register of Historic Places
