= Berkshire Cottages =

Wealthy family buildings in Massachusetts, US

America's Gilded Age, the post-Civil War and post-Reconstruction era, from 1865 to 1901 saw unprecedented economic and industrial prosperity. As a result of this prosperity, the nation's wealthiest families were able to construct monumental country estates in the Berkshires in Massachusetts.

== History ==
Although most uses of 'cottage' imply a small house, the use of the word in this context refers to an alternative definition, "a summer residence (often on a large and sumptuous scale)".

=== Cottages ===
Approximately seventy-six estates were built in Lenox and Stockbridge, Massachusetts, including:

- Allen Winden
- Ashintully
- Beaupré
- Bellefontaine
- Belvoir Terrace Summer Camp
- Blantyre
- Bluestone Manor
- Bonnie Brae
- Breezy Corners
- Brookhurst
- Brookside
- Cherry Hill
- Chesterwood
- Clipston Grange
- Coldbrook
- Deepdene
- Eastover
- Edgewood
- Elm Court
- Erskine Park
- Groton Place
- Gusty Gables
- High Lawn
- Holmesdale
- Kellogg Terrace
- Lakeside
- Merrywood
- Naumkeag
- Nestledown
- Norwood
- Oakwood
- Orleton
- Oronoque
- Overlee
- Pine Acre
- Pine Needles
- Rock Ridge
- Searles Castle
- Shadowbrook
- Spring Lawn
- Stonover
- Summerwood
- Sunnyridge
- Tanglewood
- The Homestead
- The Mount
- Valleyhead
- Ventfort Hall
- Villa Virginia
- Wheatleigh
- Windyside
- Wyndhurst

== See also ==
- List of Gilded Age mansions
