= Belvoir Terrace Summer Camp =

Performing arts camp in Lenox, Massachusetts

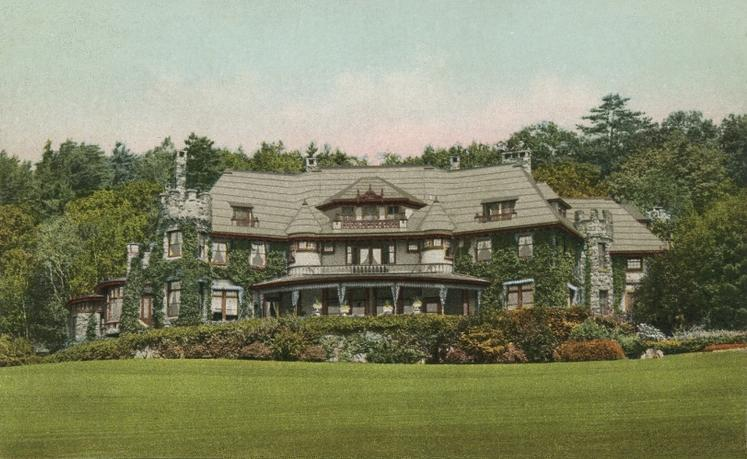
- Belvoir Terrace in 1912
- Interactive map of Belvoir Terrace Summer Camp
- Location: Lenox, Massachusetts, US
- Coordinates: 42.365013°N 73.284978°W
- Opened: 1954
- Slogan: Belvoir offers exciting training in art, acting, music, theater, dance, music and individual sports!
- Operating season: June–August
- Website: www.belvoirterrace.com

Belvoir Terrace is a performing arts summer camp for girls near Lenox, Massachusetts, US. The camp is used by girls to expand their abilities in theatre, art, music, and dance.

== History ==
Edna Y. Schwartz created a performing arts summer program for women at Belvoir Terrace in 1954. Her daughter, Nancy Goldberg, and granddaughter, Diane Goldberg Marcus, are the current directors/owners.

Belvoir Terrace was built by Rotch & Tilden between 1888 and 1890 for Morris K. Jesup. Its landscape was designed by Frederick Law Olmsted. (Note: Morris K. Jesup died in 1908 and left Belvoir to his wife. Upon her death in 1914, the house was left to a niece, Eleanor DeGraff Cuyler. In 1924, Cuyler sold the house to Howard Cole, the Palm Beach developer who snapped up Wyndhurst, Coldbrook and Blantyre for bargain prices and created the Berkshire Hunt and Country Club.) In the early 1920s, John Shepherd purchased and renovated the property as a summer retreat.

== Notable alumnae ==
- Terra Naomi (an alternative rock/pop musician)
- Jennifer Elise Cox Actress
