= Thierry Ruinart =

French monk and scholar

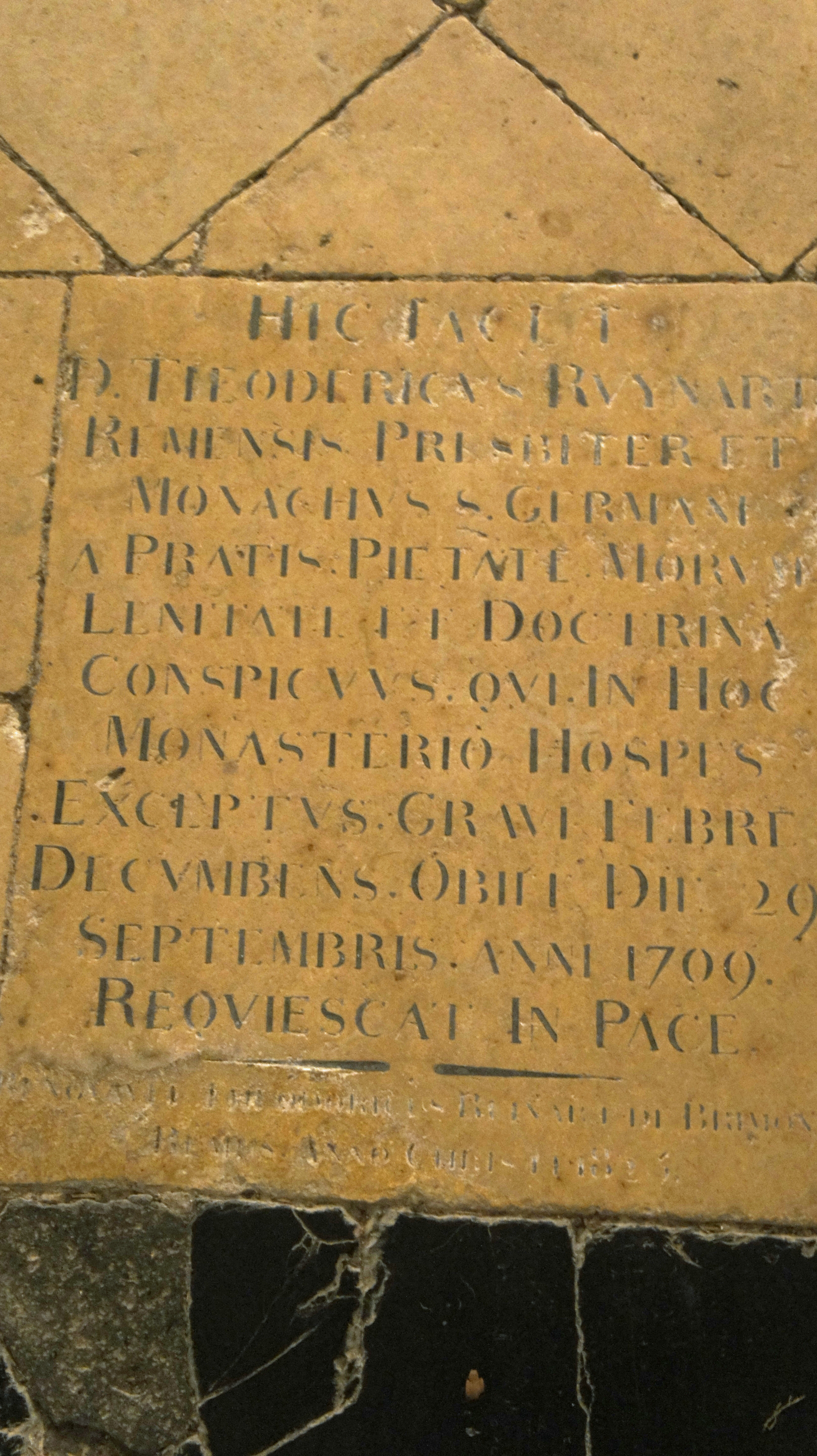
dom Ruinart at abbey d'Hautvillers.

Thierry Ruinart, OSB (also Theodore or Theodoricus; 1657–1709) was a French Benedictine monk and scholar. He was a Maurist and a disciple of Jean Mabillon. Of his many works, the one now cited is his Acta sincera, a martyrology written in Latin (with a French translation published in 1732 by Drouet de Maupertuy). Ruinart's work is one of the main sources of Alphonsus Liguori's Victories of the Martyrs. Ruinart was also interested in oenology. In 1729, his nephew Nicolas Irénée Ruinart founded the champagne house of Ruinart, which operates to this day.

== Biography ==
Thierry Ruinart was born at Reims on June 10, 1657. After completing his classical studies he entered (October 2, 1674) the Maurist Congregation of the Benedictine Order at the Abbey of Saint-Remy at Reims which, in that era, produced in France a brilliant company of distinguished scholars. His seriousness, deep piety, and fine intellectual gifts soon made him known throughout his order, and Mabillon requested the superiors to give him Ruinart as a fellow-worker. Thus in 1682 he came to the Abbey of Saint-Germain-des-Prés, near Paris, where Mabillon was staying and, under the guidance of this great investigator, became one of the most eminent church historians and critics of his time.

The first large, important work that Thierry Ruinart undertook was the publication of the Acts of the martyrs that he regarded as genuine: Acta primorum martyrum sincera et selecta (many editions; first ed. Paris, 1689; last ed., Ratisbon, 1859). Taken as a whole the collection is not surpassed even today, though individual documents are not regarded as genuine by the keener criticism of modern times. In the introduction he ably discussed the authorities for the history of the martyrs, the Christian persecutions, and in doing this refuted the opinion propounded by Dodwell (De paucitate martyrum, Oxford, 1684), that there were only a small number of martyrs in the early Church. A supplement to his work was published by Le Blant (Les actes des martyrs, Paris, 1883, in Memoires de l'Institut de France, XXX). After the Acta he published the Historia persecutionis Vandalicae of Victor Vitensis, to which he added an exhaustive discussion of the persecution of the Catholics in Africa at the hands of the Vandals (Paris, 1694; Venice, 1732).

After this he edited the works of St. Gregory of Tours (S. Gregorii Florentii episcopi Turon. opera omnia) and the chronicle of Fredegar (Paris, 1699), with a comprehensive introduction and a large number of notes. With Mabillon he published volumes VIII and IX of the Acta Sanctorum ord. S. Benedicti (Paris, 1700–01). In this same period he prepared his Apologie de la mission de Saint-Maur (Paris, 1702) as a contribution to the history of the Benedictine Order in France. He published the treatise Ecclesia Parisiensis vindicata (Paris, 1706), in defense of Mabillon's work, De re diplomatica, which had been attacked by Barthélémy Germon. Mabillon had begun, but had not been able to complete, a new edition of the De re diplomatica; this edition was now issued by Ruinart, who published in connection with it an Abrégé de la vie de J. Mabillon (Paris, 1709). At the same time he had undertaken the continuation of the Annales ord. S. Benedicti and carried it further by nearly completing the fifth volume.

While on a journey made during the year 1709, which he undertook to gather further material for this work, he was taken ill and died. The fifth volume, just mentioned, was edited (Paris, 1713) by Massuet after Ruinart's death. Several manuscripts left by Mabillon and Ruinart were edited by Vincent Thuillier (Ouvrages posthumes de Mabillon et Ruinart, three volumes, Paris, 1724). Among these were three treatises by Ruinart: Iter literarium in Alsatiam et Lotharingiam; De pallio archiepiscopali; Vita S. Urbani, PP. II. The letters of the distinguished scholar were edited by Valéry, Correspondance inédite de Mabillon et de Montfaucon (three volumes, Paris, 1846), by Jadart in his biography of Ruinart (see below), and by Gigas, Lettres des Bénédictins de Saint-Maur, 1652-1741 (three volumes, Copenhagen, 1892–93).

== Sources ==
- Massuet, Biog. de Ruinart in Annales ord. S. Benedicti, V (Paris, 1713);
- Jadart, Dom Th. Ruinart (Paris, 1886);
- Broglie, Mabillon et la société de Saint-Germain-des-prés (2 vols., Paris 1888);
- Hurter, Nomenclator IV (3rd ed., Innsbruck 1910), 821–4.

== Works ==
- Acta primorum martyrum sincera et selecta (1689), often cited in the 1859 edition
