= Stockbridge Bowl =

Body of water in Massachusetts, United States

- Lake Mahkeenac
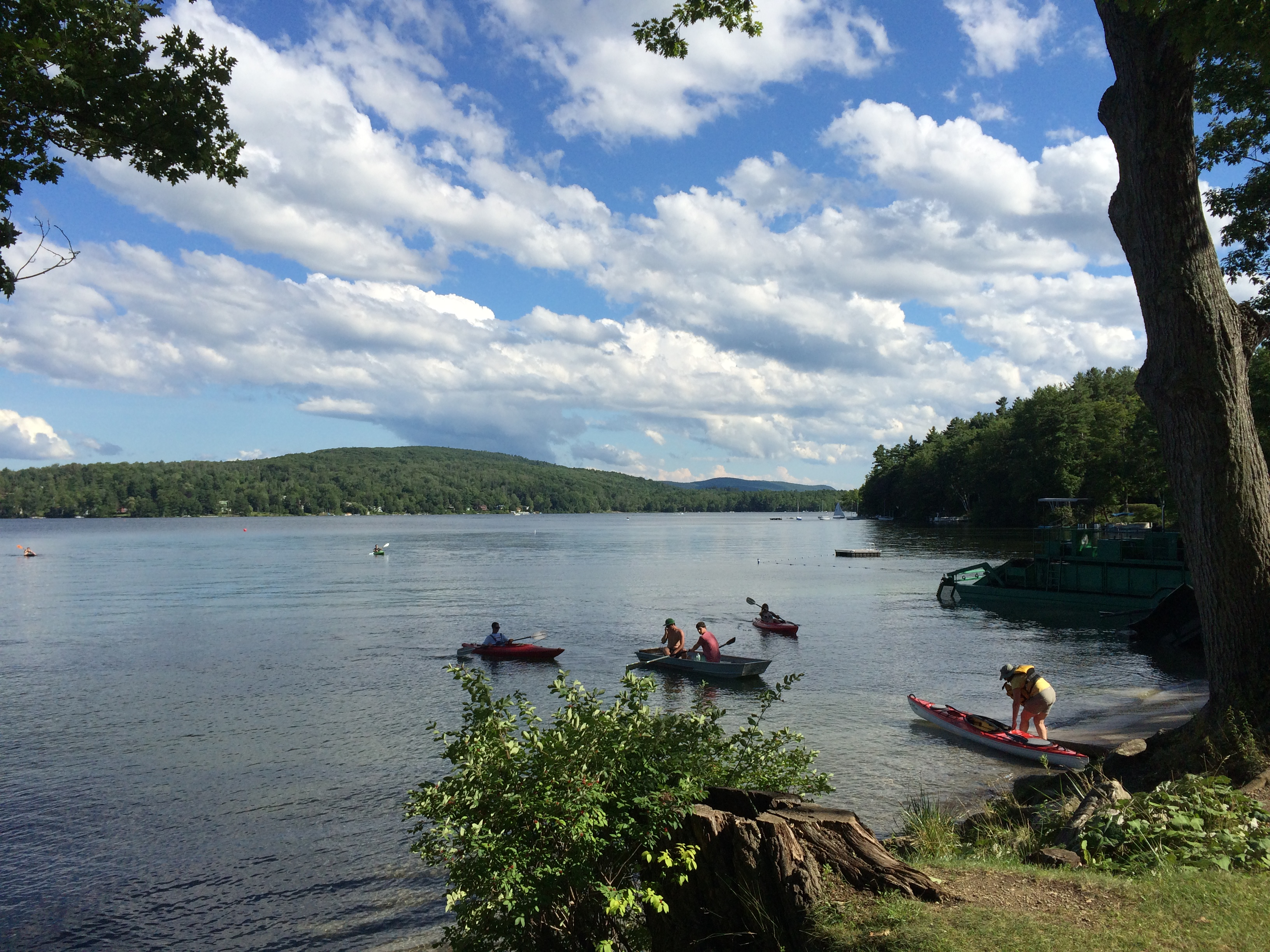
- View southeast to Rattlesnake Hill from the public boat ramp

- Location within Massachusetts Location within the United States
- Location: Stockbridge, Massachusetts
- Coordinates: 42°20′13″N 73°19′05″W
- Lake type: great pond
- Primary inflows: Lily Brook
- Primary outflows: Larrywaug Brook
- Basin countries: United States
- Max. length: 1.75 mi (2.82 km)
- Max. width: 0.75 mi (1.21 km)
- Surface area: 372 acres (151 ha)
- Max. depth: 48 ft (15 m)
- Shore length^{1}: 6 mi (9.7 km) (approx.)
- Surface elevation: 930 ft (280 m)
- Frozen: annually
- Islands: one - ‘Kwuniikwat’
- Settlements: Stockbridge, Massachusetts
- ^{1} Shore length is not a well-defined measure.

Stockbridge Bowl, also known as Lake Mahkeenac, is a 372-acre (1.51 km^{2}) artificially impounded body of water that is 2.5 miles (4 km) north of the village of Stockbridge, Massachusetts. Above the lake's north side with sweeping views to the south is Tanglewood, the summer home of the Boston Symphony Orchestra.

== Geography ==
The Bowl is situated among sloping hills of the Taconic Range to the west and north and the Berkshire Hills to the east. From the north there is an impressive view over the lake and Housatonic River plain to Monument Mountain seven miles to the south. The portion of the Taconic Range bordering the lake is known as Yokun Ridge.

The lake is 1 3/4 miles long, about 3/4 miles wide, and its shoreline totals approximately 6 miles (10 km). The primary inflow into the Bowl is from the northeast through Lily Brook. The drainage is from the southwest by Larrywaug Brook, which is a tributary to the Housatonic River. At its deepest, the lake is 48 feet (15 m) deep. The lake is artificially impounded by a dam at the end of a natural outlet a half mile from the lake's southwest corner.

Three-acre Kwuniikwat Island is at the southwest end of the lake. The island was named in 2018 by the Stockbridge-Munsee tribe.

== Environmental issues ==
The lake suffers from eutrophication due to excess nutrients blamed on runoff from development and septic systems in the immediate area. Invasive species are also impacting the lake's eco-system. These include the Eurasian Water Milfoil. Native water lilies, plentiful at the southwest corner of the lake, impact passage to the outlet and dam. Strategies to counter these problems to date have included periodic partial drainage and harvesting of lake weed during summer months. Boat inspections for Zebra mussels have, to date, succeeded in keeping the lake free of them.

== Recreation ==
Stockbridge Bowl is the largest lake within the Town of Stockbridge, with a public boat ramp making the lake accessible to all, provided that any vessel being launched into the Bowl must be thoroughly washed first to remove all possible Zebra Mussel contamination. Throughout the year, the lake is extensively used by scullers, canoers, kayakers, sailers, swimmers, waterskiers, powerboaters, and fishermen. Using Jet-skis is forbidden. January–March, if the lake has frozen, ice-fishing is common. The State stocks it with trout twice yearly and there is a high population of typical still-water fish. The Bowl is also home to the Mahkeenak Boating Club, a venerable sailing and social club with a three-story boathouse on the western side of the lake. When not performing or practicing, many members of the Boston Symphony Orchestra enjoy a beach owned by the BSO on the northern shore of the lake. Residents of the Town of Stockbridge may use the Town Beach on the southeast corner of the Bowl.

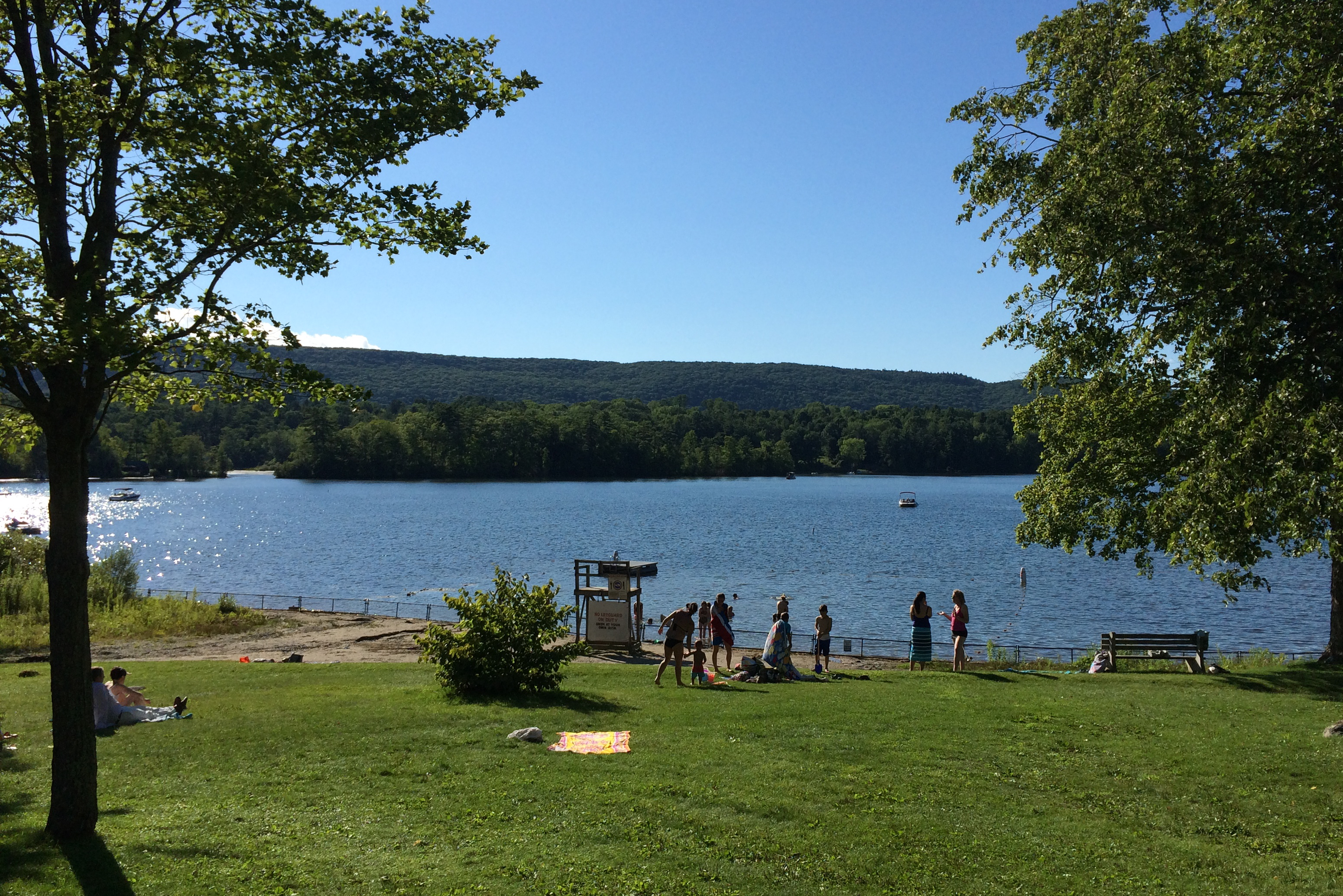
Stockbridge Town Beach at Stockbridge Bowl, view from the east to West Stockbridge Mountain

=== Josh Billings RunAground ===
Each September, during the annual Josh Billings RunAground, a team triathlon event, the middle leg of the race requires canoers and kayakers to navigate one and three-quarters times around the perimeter of the lake. Up to 550 teams compete in the "Josh." The first leg of the Josh is a 28-mile (45 km) bike race which starts in Great Barrington; and, the final leg is a six-mile foot race that begins at the water's edge in Camp Mah-Kee-Nac and ends at the main gate to Tanglewood.

== Residences ==
The shoreline is the site of more than 450 private cottages. Estates from the Gilded Age and their historic sites are adjacent to the lake. and numerous in the area. Seranak Cottage, above the lake's north side, is a 34-room house owned by the Boston Symphony Orchestra. This was formerly the summer home of Serge Koussevitzky, the music director of the orchestra and the founder of Tanglewood Music Center. The Shadow Brook Farm Historic District is part of the former Shadowbrook estate, once owned by Andrew Carnegie, and where he died. His homesite is now occupied by the Kripalu Center, a yoga, health and wellness retreat center. Nearby Wheatleigh is another remnant of the Gilded Age that is now a resort.

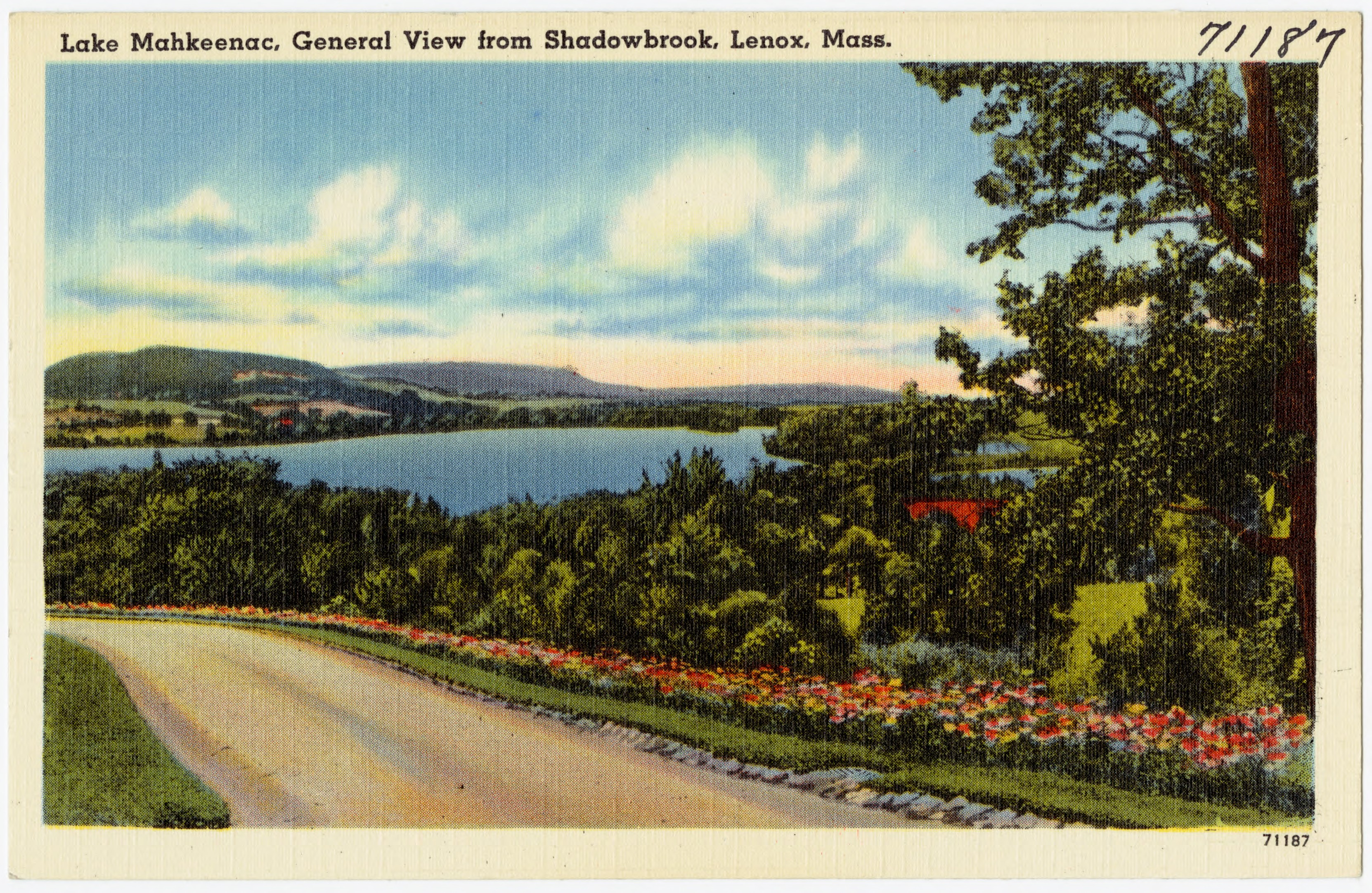
Lake Mahkeenac (Stockbridge Bowl), view to the southeast from the Shadowbrook estate with Rattlesnake Hill and Beartown Mountain in the distance

== Stockbridge Bowl Association ==
As a Great Pond, the lake is owned by the Commonwealth of Massachusetts. The Town of Stockbridge maintains it and, since 1946, has been assisted by the Stockbridge Bowl Association in protecting and restoring the ecology of Stockbridge Bowl. The Association or "SBA" has approximately 350 members who live in or near the watershed of the Bowl. SBA has taken an active role in promoting safe use of the lake and in controlling the quality of the lake.

After receiving preliminary approval from MassWildlife's Natural Heritage & Endangered Species Program (NHESP), in 2012, the SBA spearheaded the installation of a 255 foot long diversion drain which could allow the water level in the Bowl to be drawn down 5.5 feet in the late fall. Such a drawdown has been successful in many other lakes in the Berkshires and elsewhere to limit the growth of an invasive Eurasian Water Milfoil. The four-foot diameter diversion drain cost $1 million to engineer, to get regulatory approval and to install. The SBA worked closely with the Town to raise the funds needed for this project. Richard Seltzer, President of the SBA, noted that "The ability to achieve a 5.5 foot (1.7 m) drawdown is a major milestone in improving and restoring the health of the Bowl. It represents a triumph of cooperation between the Board of Selectmen and the SBA." NHESP subsequently determined that a species of snail common in some other states, but present only in Stockbridge Bowl and nearby Laurel Lake. would be endangered by such a significant drawdown, and has withdrawn its approval of it.

SBA's fundraising efforts, and Town and State contributions, have generated a fund that will be used to support additional efforts to improve lake habitat. Some dredging to remove silt that has accumulated in the lake bottom, and hydro raking to control waterlilies is anticipated to begin as early as 2019. The SBA is also working to secure the necessary approval for the use of herbicides in common and effective use in other lakes that, by interfering with photosynthesis, can prevent plant overgrowth without interfering with animal life.

The SBA owns the island at the southwest corner of the lake, and in 2018 renamed it "Kwuniikwat," to honor the historical presence in the area of the Stockbridge-Muncie tribe of Mohicans, and their traditions of stewardship for their lands.

== Dam ==
The 340-foot-long (100 m) earthen Stockbridge Bowl Dam was completed in 1880. It is owned by the Town Of Stockbridge. A 2008 inspection found the dam in "satisfactory" condition.

== In Literature ==
Lydia Sigourney's poem The Stockbridge Bowl was published in her Scenes in my Native Land, 1845 together with some descriptive text.
