= René Massuet =

French Benedictine monk (1666–1716)

René Massuet (13 August 1666 – 11 January 1716) was a French Benedictine patrologist, of the Congregation of St. Maur.

== Biography ==
Massuet was born at St. Ouen de Mancelles in the diocese of Évreux. He made his solemn profession in religion in 1682 at Notre Dame de Lire. He joined the Congregation of Saint Maur. He studied at Bonnenouvelle in Orléans, where he showed more than ordinary ability. After teaching philosophy in the Abbey of Bec, and theology at St. Stephen's, in Caen, he attended the lectures of the university and obtained the degrees of bachelor and licentiate in law.

After this he taught a year at Jumièges and three years at Fécamp. He spent the year 1702 in Rome in the study of Greek. The following year he was called to St. Germain des Prés in Paris and taught theology there to the end of his life.

== Works ==
Massuet's principal work, which he undertook rather reluctantly, is his edition of the writings of St. Irenaeus, Paris, 1710, with accompanying essays on the life, writings, and teaching of the saint. His other works include:

- editing the fifth volume of the Annales Ordinis S. Benediciti, of Jean Mabillon, with some additions and a preface inclusive of the biographies of Mabillon and Thierry Ruinart
- a letter to John B. Langlois, S.J., in defence of the Benedictine edition of St. Augustine
- five letters addressed to Bernard Pez found in J. G. Schelhorn's Amoenitates Literariae
- (in manuscript form) Augustinus Graecus, in which he quotes all the passages of St. John Chrysostom on grace.
