= Wheatleigh =

Historic country estate

- U.S. National Register of Historic Places
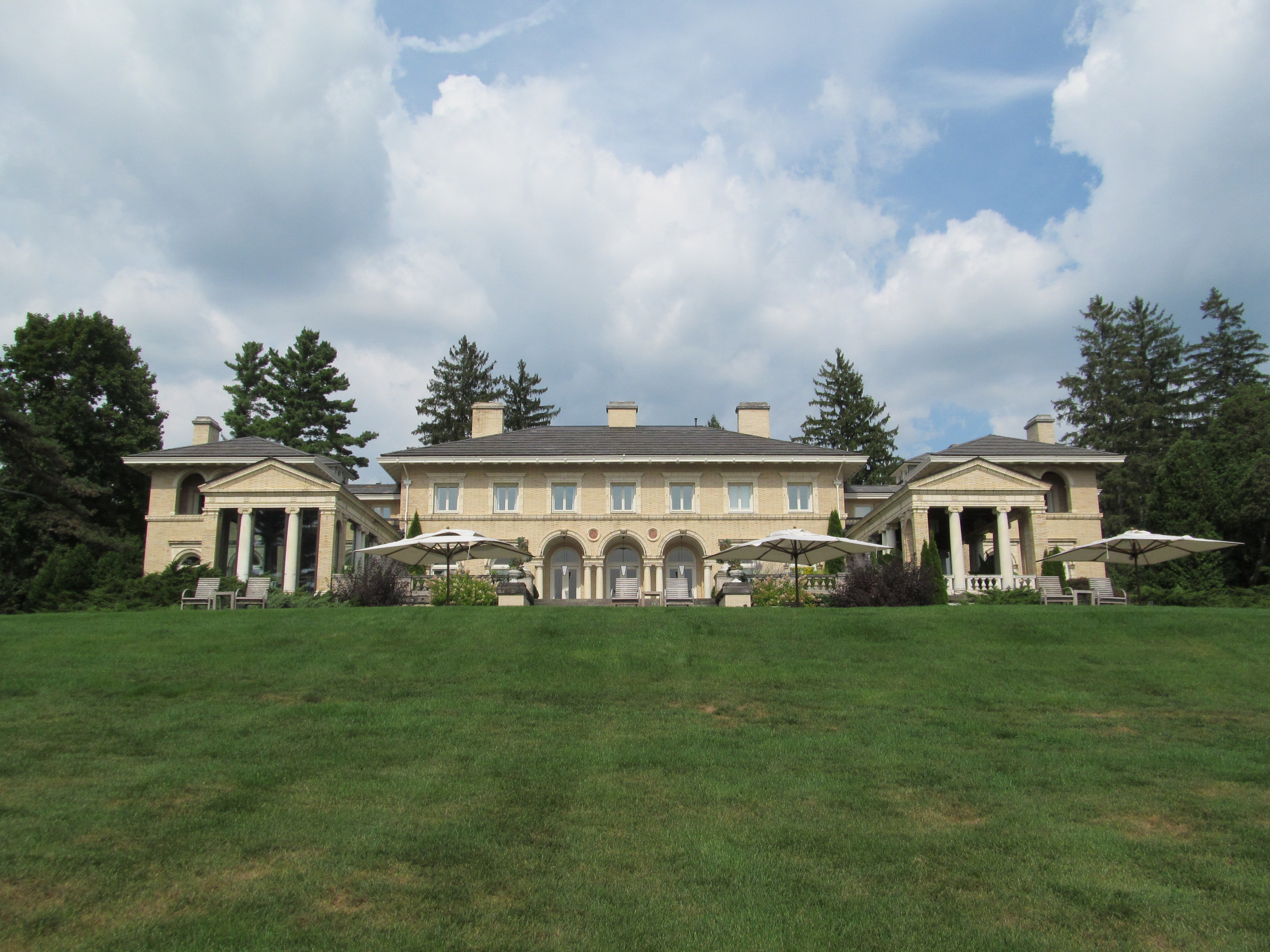
- Wheatleigh

- Location within Massachusetts Location within the United States
- Interactive map showing the location of Wheatleigh
- Location: W. Hawthorne Rd; Stockbridge, Massachusetts
- Coordinates: 42°20′22.1″N 73°17′49.4″W
- Area: 22 acres (8.9 ha)
- Built: 1893; 133 years ago
- Architect: Peabody and Stearns
- Architectural style: Italian Villa
- NRHP reference No.: 82004956
- Added to NRHP: April 6, 1982

Wheatleigh is a historic country estate on West Hawthorne Road in Stockbridge, Massachusetts, United States. Built in 1893 to a design by Peabody and Stearns, it is one of the few surviving great Berkshire Cottages of the late 19th century, with grounds landscaped by Frederick Law Olmsted. Its estate now reduced to 22 acres (8.9 ha), Wheatleigh was listed on the National Register of Historic Places in 1982. It is now operated as a hotel.

== Description and history ==
Wheatleigh is located in far northeastern Stockbridge, just south of the Tanglewood facility of the Boston Symphony Orchestra on the east side of West Hawthorne Road. The estate is located atop a knoll from which there are commanding views of Stockbridge Bowl to the west. The remnant portion of the estate includes only the main house and water tower of the formerly 250-acre (100 ha) property, which also included greenhouses, a large garage with apartments above, an icehouse, barn, and three gatehouses. The house is a large 2 1/2-story, 25,478 sq ft (2,367.0 m^{2}) masonry building, with Mediterranean Revival styling. It is organized in a U shape, with a central main block, a bedroom wing to the north, and a loggia and "summer house" to the south. It is built out of buff brick with terra cotta trim. The water tower is 100 feet (30 m) in height, built out brick in three octagonal stages, and was one of the tallest structures in Berkshire County when it was completed.

Henry H. Cook was a New York-based businessman who made his fortune in the railroad and banking businesses. He purchased the undeveloped estate land in 1892, and oversaw construction and landscaping of the property. He named it Wheatleigh, in homage to his family's ancestral home, Wheatley, Oxfordshire. The house, designed by the Boston architectural firm of Peabody and Stearns, received notice in architectural publications, and was described by Charles McKim as one of the best examples of modern Italian Villa architecture.

The property passed to Cook's daughter, Gloria de Heredia, who opened the formal gardens on the grounds for vespers church services in the summer, and was a financial backer behind the establishment of Tanglewood. The estate was sold out of the Cook family in 1946, and the 22-acre (8.9 ha) house grounds were subdivided off soon afterward. The property was owned by the Boston Symphony Orchestra between 1949 and 1957. Since 1976 it has served as a hotel.

The property was acquired in 1983 by L. Linfield and Susan Simon under the holding name of Su Lin Inc. Operations as a hotel were discontinued in the Spring of 2024 following a series of mismanagement scandal, notably the 2021 class-action lawsuit for unpaid wages and misappropriation of tips of the employees The property listed for sale on 22-acres for $15 million, still unsold as of December 2025.

== See also ==
- National Register of Historic Places listings in Berkshire County, Massachusetts
