= Blantyre (disambiguation) =

Blantyre is Malawi's second-largest city.

Blantyre may also refer to:

- Blantyre District, of which the city is the capital
- Blantyre, South Lanarkshire, a town in Scotland
  - Blantyre (ward), a local electoral division
- Blantyre, Queensland, an Australian hamlet
- Blantyre (estate), Massachusetts, United States
- Blantyre, Toronto, part of Birch Cliff, a Canadian neighbourhood

== See also ==
- Blantyre House, a disused English prison and former mansion
- Lord Blantyre, a title of nobility in the Peerage of Scotland
