= Vincent Thuillier =

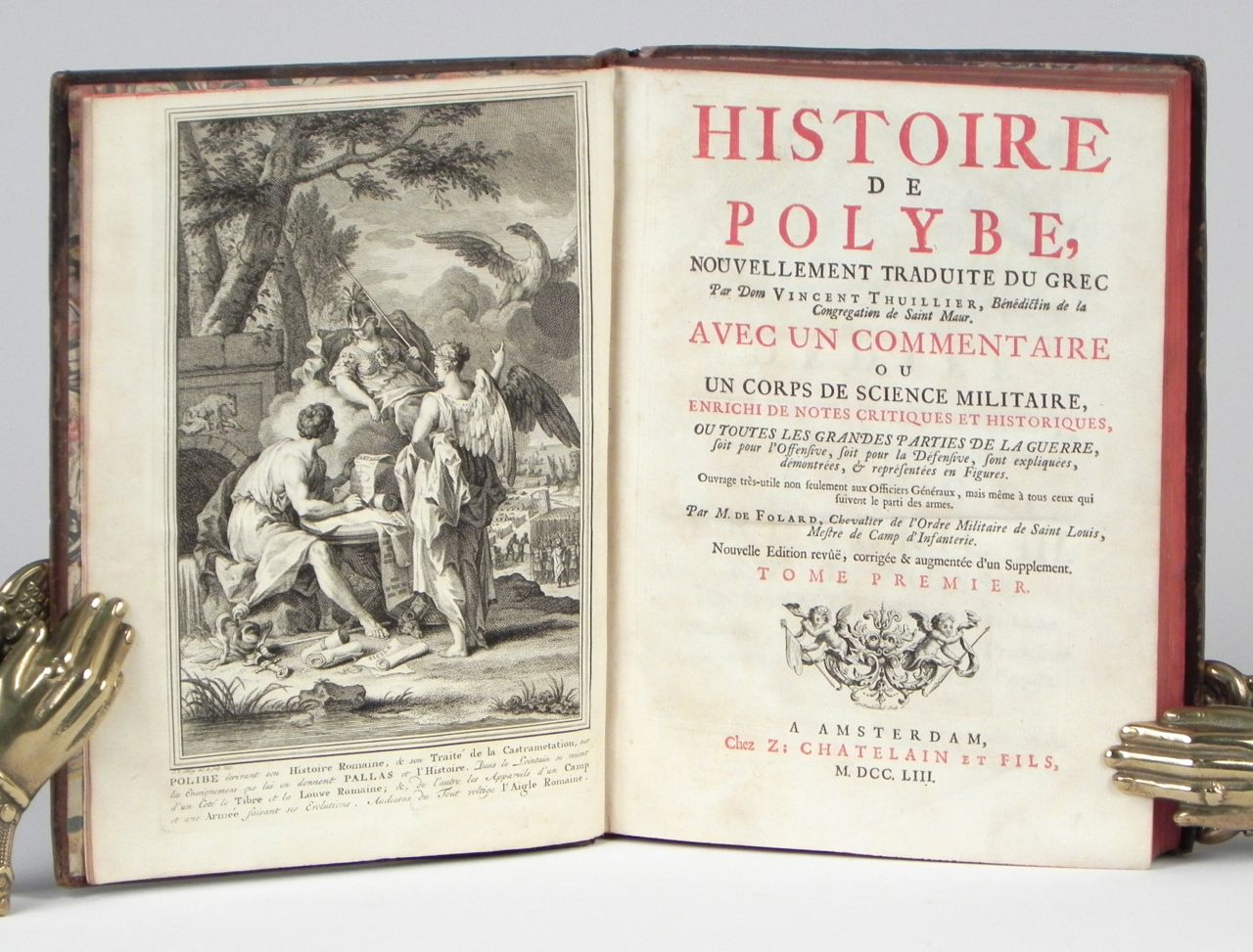
Histoire de Polybe, frontispiece and title page

Vincent Thuillier (1685–1736) was a French Maurist scholar, known as an author, editor and translator.

== Life ==
Thuillier was born at Coucy. He entered the Congregation of Saint Maur in 1703, and for most of his life taught theology at the Abbey of Saint-Germain-des-Prés.

The papal bull Unigenitus of 1713, aimed at Jansenism, found Thuillier initially an opponent. Having changed his position, he wrote two open letters supporting Unigenitus. The bull was a contentious matter within the Maurists, and Thuillier's arguments, against those appealing against the bull, were attacked by Edme Perreau (Edmond Perrault).

Thuillier used the humanist name Thuillerius. He exchanged letters with Richard Bentley in Cambridge. John Walker from 1719 travelled to France, as Bentley's collaborator in a project to collate New Testament manuscripts, and Thuillier was one of the Benedictine scholars who assisted him.

== Works ==
- Ouvrages posthumes de Mabillon et Ruinart, (3 vols., Paris, 1724). Edition by Thuillier of manuscripts left by Jean Mabillon and Thierry Ruinart, including Ruinart's Iter literarium in Alsatiam et Lotharingiam, De pallio archiepiscopali and Vita S. Urbani.
- Histoire de la nouvelle édition de Saint Augustin, donnée par les Pères Bénédictins de la Congrégation de S. Maur (1736), edited by Claude-Pierre Goujet.
