= Crew Dinner =

Painting by Julien Le Blant

- Dîner de l'équipage (French)
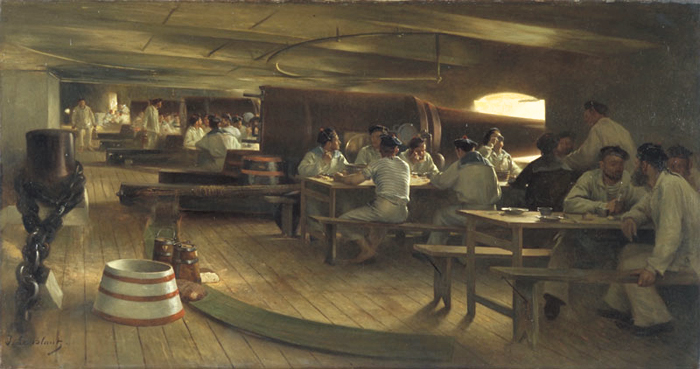
- Artist: Julien Le Blant
- Year: 1884
- Medium: Oil on canvas
- Dimensions: 121 cm × 224 cm (48 in × 88 in)
- Location: Musée national de la Marine, Paris

Crew Dinner (French: Dîner de l'équipage), or Crew in a Battery 1884 (French: Équipage dans une batterie 1884), is an oil-on-canvas painting made in 1884 by the French artist Julien Le Blant, exhibited at the Salon of Paris the same year. It depicts a meal scene between sailors on board a warship. Preserved at the Musée national de la Marine, the work is a deposit of the Fonds national d'art contemporain (FNAC).

== Description ==
The scene is illuminated by the light of the setting sun, which enters through the gun ports and suggests the end of the meal. The sailors, relaxed, are dressed in white uniforms of light cloth, and some are barefoot. They dine at wooden tables set between three imposing cannons, the breech-loading of which is visible. In the foreground, a table with two empty seats creates an opening inviting the viewer to enter the scene.

== Analysis ==
Specializing in war painting, Le Blant paints pictures which depict the daily life of soldiers. Here, the scene is set in a battleship. The ship, its destination, and the conflict in which it is engaged are not identified. The dating of the work, however, allows us to suppose that it could be a colonial war, such as the Sino-French War (1884–1885) or the first Franco-Malagasy War (1883–1885). Le Blant avoids any explicit reference to political or military issues and chooses to represent these men during a moment of relaxation, which contrasts with the uncertainty linked to conflict and war.
