= John Walker (scholar) =

John Walker (1692/3–1741) was an English classical scholar, a collaborator of Richard Bentley.

== Life ==
He was son of Thomas Walker of Huddersfield, and was educated, like Richard Bentley, at Wakefield School, where he was under Edward Clarke. He entered Trinity College, Cambridge, as a pensioner on 24 May 1710, at the age of seventeen. He was Craven scholar in 1712. He graduated B.A. in 1713, and was elected minor fellow on 28 September 1716. He took his M.A., and was elected socius major and sublector tertius in 1717.

In 1719 he went to Paris, as Bentley's emissary, to collect readings for a proposed Græco-Latin New Testament, which had been projected by Bentley about 1716. J. J. Wetstein had been employed on the project, but had returned to Switzerland. Walker was well received at Paris, especially by the Maurists; after some suspicion of a clash of literary interests between their project for an edition of the Versio Itala and Bentley's undertaking, Walker received co-operation, especially from Vincent Thuillier, Pierre Sabatier, Simon Mopinot, and Bernard de Montfaucon. He remained in Paris for nearly a year. Walker collated the whole New Testament in five Latin manuscripts at Paris, and part of it in nine others, besides noting the readings of four Tours manuscripts collated by Léon Chevallier, which were given him by Sabatier. Next year (1721) he returned to Paris, this time to collate Greek texts. The winter of 1721-2 was, however, spent in Brussels in the company of Charles Graham, 3rd Viscount Preston (died 1739). Here Walker collated the manuscript of Arnobius and Minucius Felix, and the Corsendonk Greek Testament, and succeeded in identifying many of the manuscripts used by Lucas Brugensis. When the fear of the plague had abated, Walker returned to Paris, and seems to have remained there till 1723.

Walker also collated a number of manuscripts of Archbishop William Wake. Altogether Walker seems to have collated some seventy-eight Greek manuscripts, containing the whole or parts of the New Testament.

Subsequently, he became dean and rector of Bocking, Essex, in the archbishop's patronage, 15 November 1725. He became chancellor of the Diocese of St Davids on 17 July 1727. His marriage followed six months later, 26 January 1728. He was made D.D. under royal commission (together with Richard Walker the vice-master) on 25 April 1728. Wake appointed him archdeacon of Hereford on 3 February 1729, and on 12 December 1730 rector of St. Mary Aldermary; he also became incumbent of St Thomas the Apostle in the same year.

Walker was also chaplain to King George II. Walker died on 9 November 1741, at the age of 48.

== Works ==
Walker made emendations of Cicero's De Natura Deorum, printed at the end of the edition of John Davies, President of Queens' College, Cambridge in 1718, and mentioned in the preface. Zachary Pearce also incorporated some notes of Walker's in his edition of the De Officiis in 1745. These emendations were in Bentley's style.

While working for the New Testament project, Walker also helped Bentley with various readings of manuscripts of Suetonius and Cicero's Tusculans. For his own part he was preparing an edition of Arnobius, and left his materials to Richard Mead.

The collapse of his major literary project with Bentley was for reasons that are unclear. In any case Walker's death was followed shortly by Bentley's.

== Family ==
Walker married in 1728 Charlotte Sheffield, one of the three illegitimate daughters of John Sheffield, 1st Duke of Buckingham and Normanby (died 1721), by Frances Stewart, who later married Hon. Oliver Lambart; these daughters (and their brother) took the name of Sheffield under their father's will. Charlotte Walker had a fortune of some £6,000, and bore her husband six sons and four daughters. One of their sons, Henry, became fellow of King's College, Cambridge (B.A. 1757, M.A. 1760).
