= Julien Le Blant =

French painter (1851–1936)

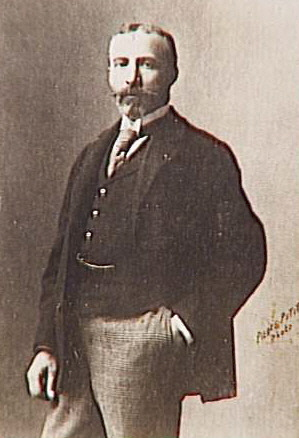
- Julien Le Blant
- Born: March 30, 1851; Paris, France
- Died: February 28, 1936 (aged 84); Paris, France
- Known for: Oil painting, watercolor painting, pen and ink drawing
- Movement: Paris Salon, genre painting
- Awards: Legion of Honor, 1885; Bronze Medal, Salon, 1878; Silver Medal, Salon, 1880; Gold Medal Exposition, Universelle, 1889

Julien Le Blant (March 30, 1851 – February 28, 1936) was a French painter who specialised in military art, focusing on the War in the Vendée. Because he came from a family from the Bas-Poitou, part of the old province of Poitou, Le Blant was descended from the French "Blancs" who had opposed the French Revolution and was thus in sympathy with those who rose up and formed the Catholic and Royal Army of the Vendée. He spent his artistic career commemorating the events of the rebellion in large works that were exhibited in the annual Paris Salon.

Le Blant was a much honored painter and he won a Bronze Medal at the Salon in 1878, a Silver Medal in 1880 and a Gold Medal at the 1889 Exposition Universelle, the Paris World's Fair that commemorated the centennial of the beginning of the French Revolution. Le Blant was also a prolific illustrator, contributing more than five hundred illustrations to dozens of books. Le Blant's last major accomplishment was a large series of drawings, watercolors and paintings of French soldiers on their way home from and departing to the front during the First World War. His work is in a number of public collections, but primarily in France because the subjects he specialized in did not command great popularity abroad.

== Biography ==
=== Childhood and training ===
Le Blant was born in 1851, the first son of Edmond-Frederic Le Blant (1818–1897) and Marie Louise Gasparine Lemaire Le Blant. His father was trained as an attorney, but he became a famous biblical archaeologist. His mother died soon after giving birth to her son and Juilen was raised by a stepmother. According to family accounts, Julien was a difficult child. He was educated at the lycée Bonaparte and by the Dominicans at d'Arcueil. He studied in the atelier of Ernst-Joseph-Angleton Girard (1813–1898), who was in turn a student or "élève" of d'Isabey. Le Blant made his debut at the Paris Salon in 1874 with "Assassinat de Lepellier Saint Fargeau". From the beginning of his career he focused on military subjects and on scenes of the French Revolution. This was in great contrast to the works of other military painters of the time who usually portrayed the glories of the subsequent Napoleonic Wars. French painters of the time were obsessed with realism and so Le Blant collected uniforms, muskets and peasant's clothing to have his models that posed for him wear. His work was popular and he was sought after both as a painter and an illustrator. While his large works were in oil, he also developed a reputation for his watercolors. In addition to his scenes of military campaigns and armies, he also painted maritime subjects, but warships rather than scenes of commerce.

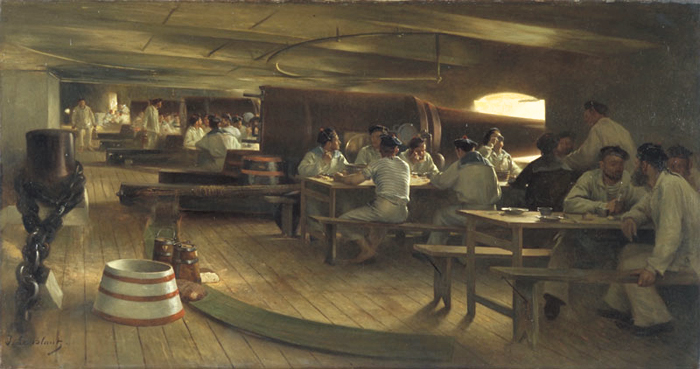
Diner de l'equipage, oil on canvas, 121 cm × 224 cm, 1890, Collection Palais de Chaillot, Paris

=== The Vendée ===
From the beginning of his career, Le Blant was focused on memorializing the revolt that occurred against the French Revolution in the Vendée. This campaign against Revolutionary authority began in 1793 and ended in 1796 with the capture and execution of the last of its major leaders. Le Blant portrayed the leaders and occurrences of "La Vendée in virtually all of his major works. The Vendée revolt is one of the most controversial subjects in French history. A series of new edicts from the Revolutionary government in Paris is credited with setting off the revolt. These included an increase in taxation, conscription and a number of anti-clerical measures that the deeply religious people of the region resisted. The Revolutionary troops were spread thin in the region, and as the revolt widened the hastily formed Catholic Army of the Vendee managed to capture a number of towns and win a series of pitched battles. Eventually, through superior numbers and equipment, the forces of the Revolution defeated the rebels, and the campaign to put down the revolt became notoriously savage. While there were atrocities on both sides, the government in Paris wanted the rebellion to be put down savagely in order to discourage further revolts against its authority, and it was. The most modern academic estimates are that about a quarter of the population – men, women and children – were killed by the troops of the Revolutionary and their sympathizers.

Le Blant's sympathies were clearly with the counter-revolutionaries who rose up and fought against the French Revolution on behalf of the Royalty and Catholic Church. His first great Salon painting, exhibited when he was twenty-seven, was "Mort du général d’Elbée" or "The Death of General d’Elbée." In this work Le Blant depicted the wounded general's execution. General d’Elbée (1752–1794) had been mortally wounded and so after his capture, he was carried out to be executed on his chair, and his wife and family suffered the same fate. "The Execution of General Charette" or "L'Exécution du Général Charette" depicted the fate of another one of the Catholic Army's leaders, François de Charette (1763–1796). "Henri de la Rochejacquelin" was a large work that portrayed one of the first leaders of the revolt, the nobleman Henri de la Rochejacquelin (1772–1794). Le Blants's "Un Chouan" was a depiction of an anonymous counter-revolutionary from the Vendée who came to become known colloquially as Les Chouans. This work came to symbolize the peasants in the revolt, and it was reproduced widely in the 19th century, and it is still used on book covers on the Vendée rebellion today.

=== Salons, exhibitions, honors ===
In the 1878 Salon he won a Bronze Medal for "Mort du général d’Elbée" ("The Death of General d'Elbée). In 1880 he was a Silver Medal for "Le Bataillon carré" ("The Battalion Square") which was also awarded a Gold Medal at the Exposition Universelle (1889) (The Paris Worlds Fair). He was made a Knight of the Legion of Honor by the French Government in December 1885 (Chevalier de la Légion d'Honneur). Le Blant's works were chosen to represent France in the Chicago World's Fair, formally known as the World's Columbian Exposition, in 1893. In the official catalog for the Exposition, his work was contrasted against the works of Paul-Louis-Narcisse Grolleron (1848–1901): "Grolleron and Le Blant are in better taste, though they approach their subjects from very different points of view. The former renders a good dramatic incident in a serious and well-considered composition, soberly and rather better painted than usual; the latter brings a sly touch of sarcasm and humor. His ‘Retour du Regiment’ – from the heroic army of the Sambre-et-Meuse we will suppose shows the grimy, ragged and ferocious battalion drawn up for inspection in the public square and idly reviewed by a supercilious crowd of dandies, muscadins and incroyables, each with the dernier cri de la mode and each more absurd than his neighbor. The warriors scowl darkly under this complacent observation, and there are signs of an outbreak by one or two of the older moustaches.”

=== Illustration career ===
In 1885, Julien Le Blant embarked on a second career as an illustrator and he was active illustrating books until his death. The first book that he illustrated was on the military, written by Alfred de Vigny and LeBlant contributed a frontispiece and six engravings. In 1886, he illustrated the George Sand novel Mauprat and Le Chevalier des Touches. Le Blant did more than sixty drawings for the notebooks of Captain Coignet, which is considered a classic account of the Napoleonic Wars. When editors required illustrations of the Vendee campaigns, Le Blant was commissioned to do the illustrations. His works were used as the basis for a series of engravings in Honoré de Balzac's book, Les Chouans which was translated and published in English in 1889. He did 161 illustrations for Alexandre Dumas Le Chevalier de Maison Rouge, a profusely illustrated limited edition book For illustrations, he would do original compositions for the book and then an engraver would reproduce his works for publication. His illustrations could be pen & ink, a medium he was particularly adept at, in watercolor or in oil. Then, once the book project was complete, it was Le Blant's practice to sell off the illustrations at the Hotel Drouot auction house. His illustrations for Les Chouans were sold this was in 1891, "Enfant Perdu de Toudouze" in 1894 and "Cahiers Du Capitaine Coignet" in 1896. He was considered a consummate draftsman and he worked extensively in pen & ink and watercolor for the books he illustrated. His last illustration project came in 1924; it was an American book of poetry, In the Hills, written by the wealthy Baltimore art patron and Peace Activist Theodore Marburg (1862–1946).

=== Le Bataillon carré, Le Blant's gold medal painting ===
Le Blant's most famous work is said to be "Le Bataillon carré" a large work that won medals in the Paris Salon of 1880, where it won a Silver Medal and the Paris World's Fair of 1889, where it was awarded a Gold Medal. It was purchased by the National Gallery of Australia in New South Wales and then deaccessioned, when Academic and Salon pictures were unpopular. This painting depicts a group of counter revolutionaries, who were referred to as "les blancs" ("the whites") ambushing the troops of the French Revolution. armed with scythes and pitchforks. This skirmish took place near the medieval stronghold of Fougères that was part of the old Duchy of Brittany. In the center of the composition, the troops of the Revolutionary Army have formed themselves into a defensive square and at the bottom, another group of peasants is rushing to attack.

William Walton described the work in his book on the paintings of the Exposition Universelle: “One of the most promising of the manor-born members of the family is M. Julien Le Blant who like Giradet, has a great affection for the incidents of the Civil War in La Vendée, of unhappy memory. Two of the most important works that he devoted to this historical theme appeared in the Exposition, and of the most famous of the two, we give a photogravure. Le Bataillon Carré first appeared in the Salon of 1880, and it is one of the best of the battle-pieces of the whole Exposition. Nothing could be finer in its line than this epic presentation of the imperturbable square battalion of “the blues” making face in all directions against the fierce rush of the stout-hearted peasants, who died for the priests and the king.” Today, "Le Bataillon carré" it is in the collection of the Harold B. Lee Library at Brigham Young University, in Provo, Utah, framed in a huge molding that replicates the original 19th-century frame.

=== Pastoral life and watercolors ===
Julien Le Blant also worked extensively in the watercolor medium. He was elected to the select membership of the Society of French Watercolorists (Société D'Aquarellistes Francais) and exhibited his work in their annual salons, beginning with the 1885 exhibition. He also painted pastoral subjects and landscapes during his vacations, which were spent in Corrèze, near Brive-la-Gaillarde. Corrèze is a département, in the region of Limousin, in South-Central France.

=== Depictions of World War I soldiers ===
When World War I broke out and rapidly turned into a stalemate, with trench lines across France, Julien Le Blant wanted to go to the front in order to paint daily life for the soldiers. Although there was a combat art program at that time for the French Army and newspaper and magazine illustrators were drawing and painting infantry combat, because of his age, which was then sixty-three, Le Blant was not allowed to go to the front. Instead, he decided to draw and paint the soldiers as they arrived and departed from the Gare de l'Est (East Station) in Paris. The neighborhood around the station was full of soldiers and Le Blant drew and painted the French and French Colonial army from life, throughout the war. He also painted the soldiers at their barracks in Reuilly, Vincenne, where they awaited departure for the front. This large body of work shows the French "Poilus at rest in a wide range of moods and postures. After the war, in 1919, these works were assembled into a large exhibition at Galerie Georges Petit. While the works were admired, it was said that the war-weariness of the public resulted in few sales and Le Blant's large body of work depicting the soldiers of the "Great War" was forgotten.

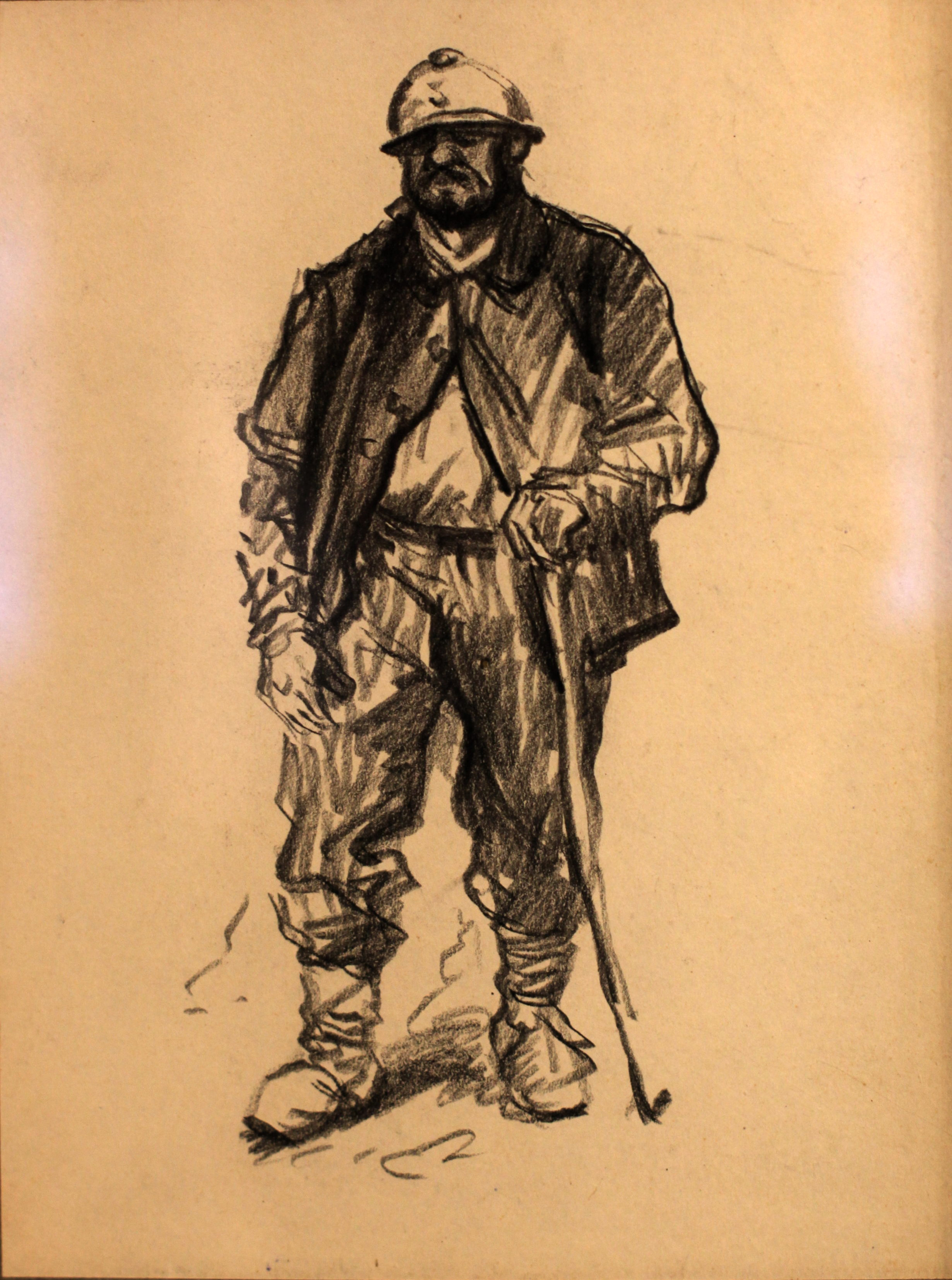

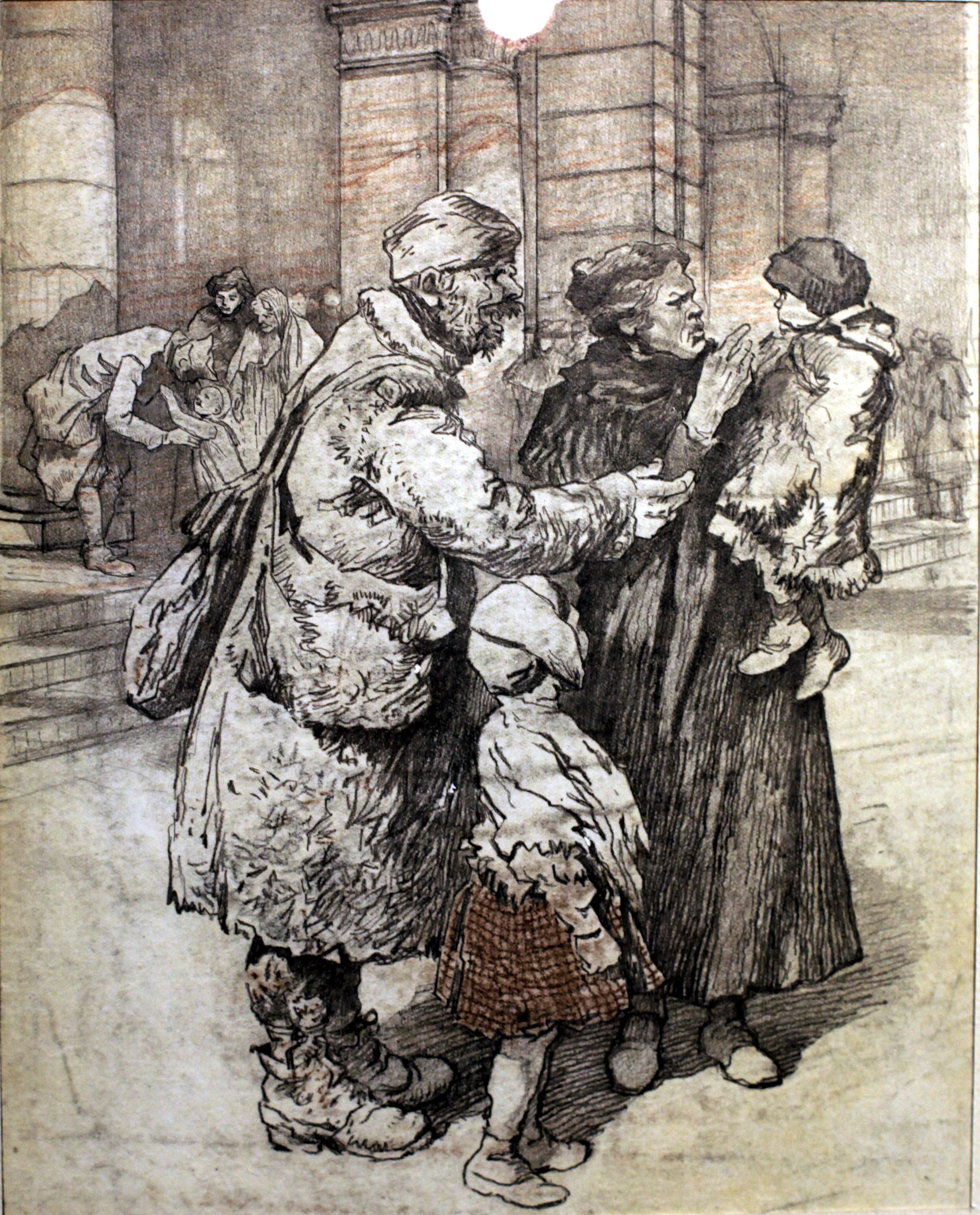

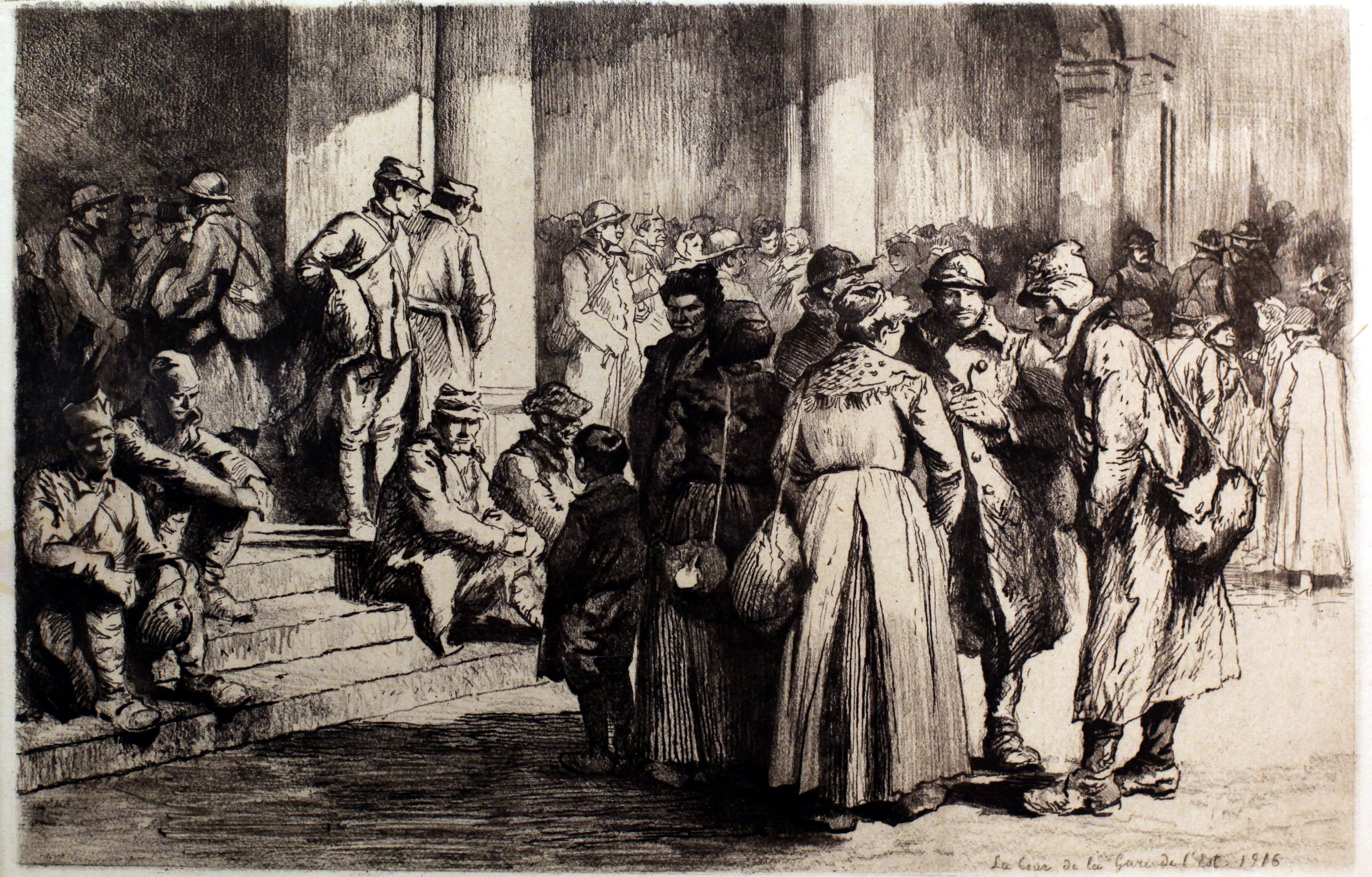

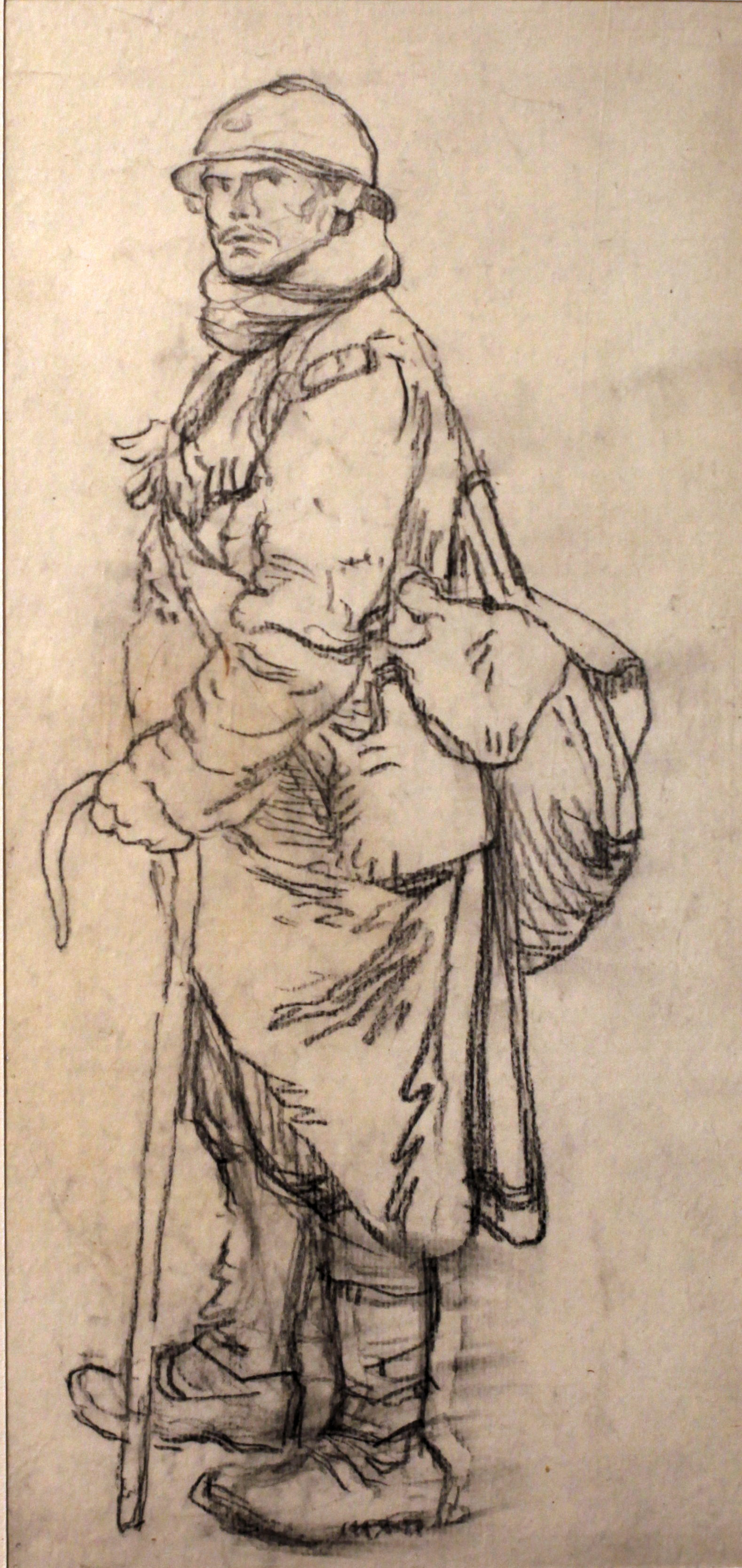

== Gallery of Le Blant's major works ==
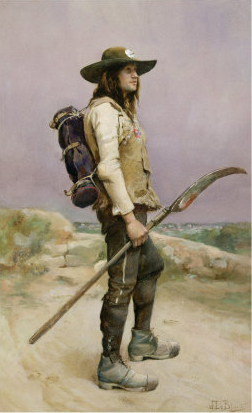
Le Vendéen

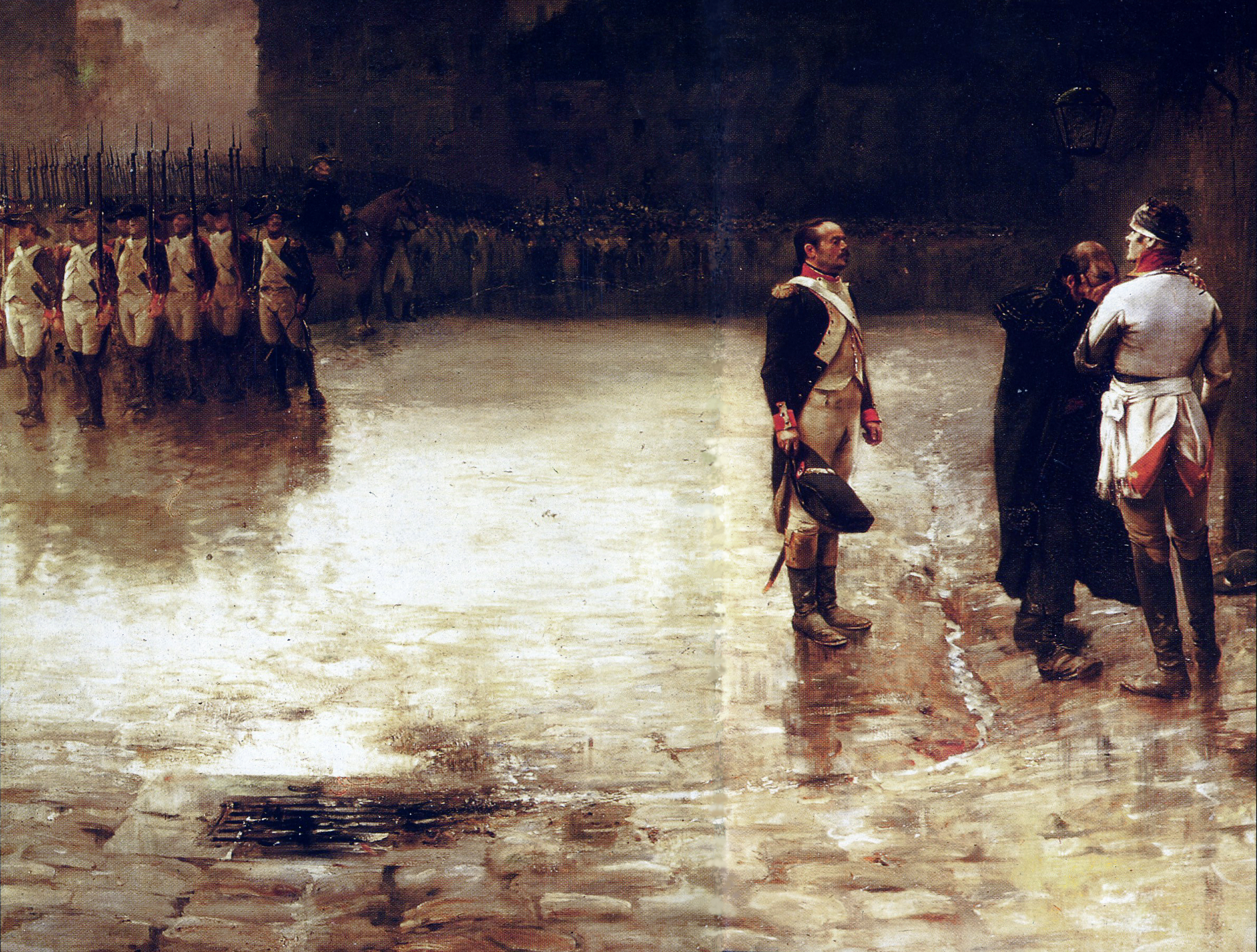
L'Exécution du Général Charette

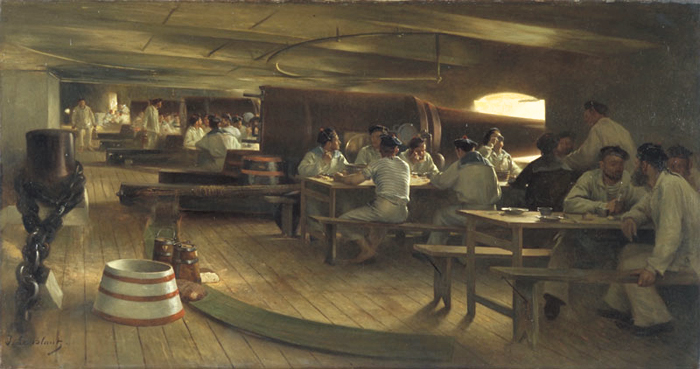
Dîner de l'équipage

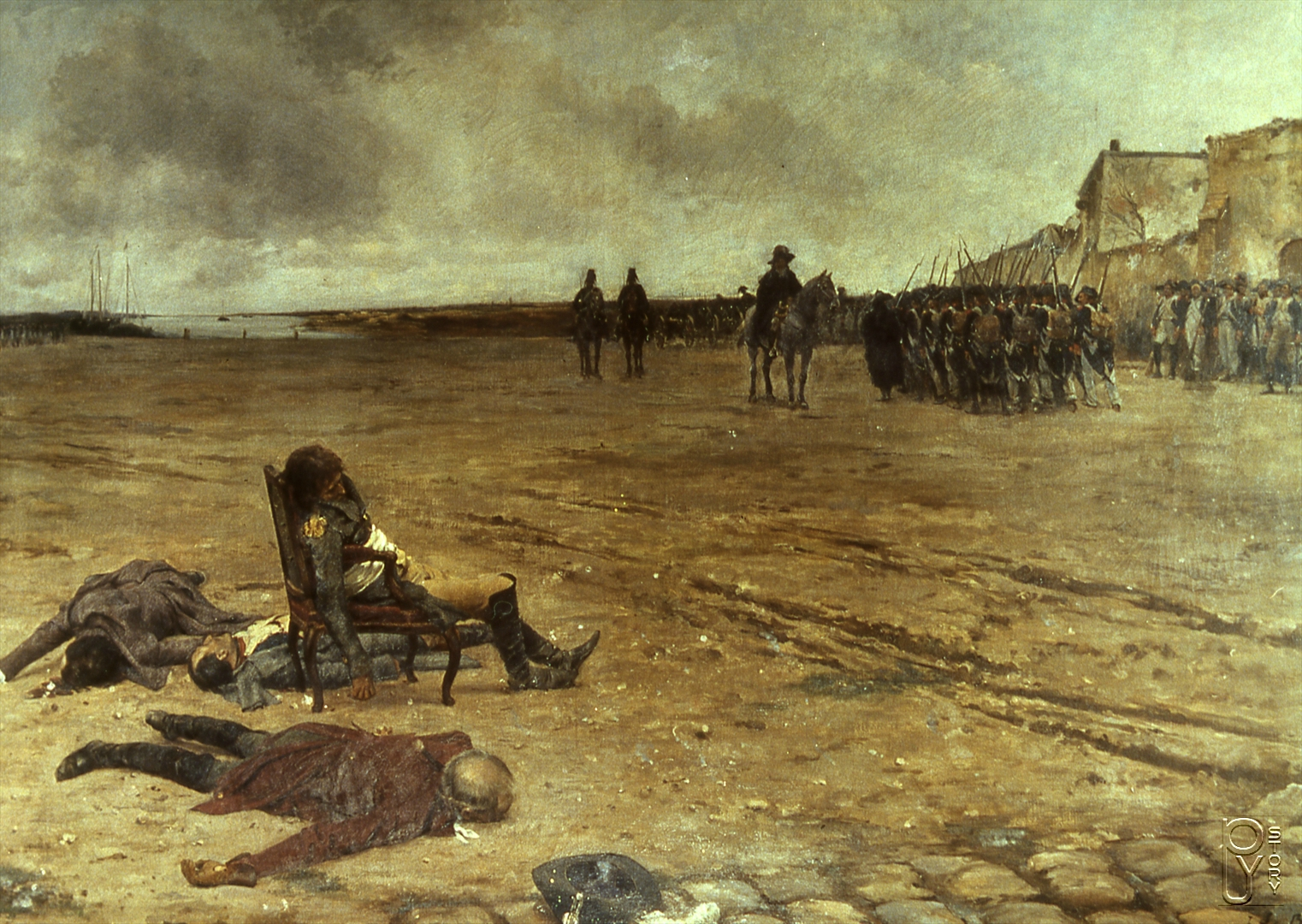
Mort du Général D'Elbée

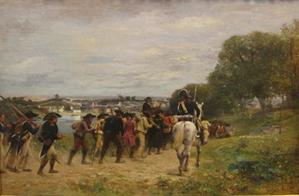
Les Réfractaires

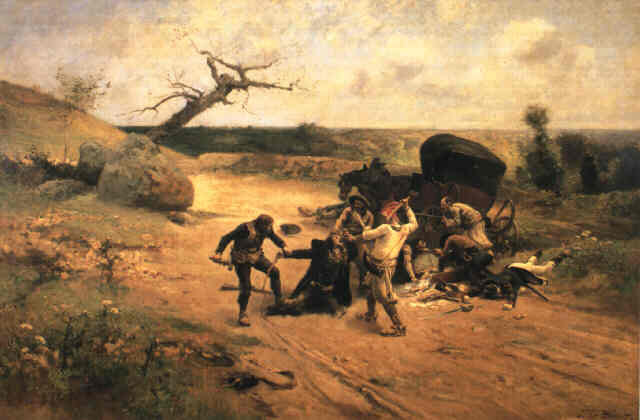
Le Courrier des Bleus

== See also ==
- Chouan
- Jean Chouan
- French Revolutionary Wars
- La Marseillaise des Blancs
- Virée de Galerne
- War in the Vendée
- World's Columbian Exposition

== Notable works by Julien Le Blant ==
- "Assassinat de Lepelletier-St-Fargeau par le garde Pâris" (" Assassination of Lepelleter Saint Fargeau") (Exhibited:Salon of 1874)
- "Bouviers romains menant leurs bêtes" (Exhibited:Société d'aquarellistes français, 1875)
- "Le Compte"
- "Les Racoleurs" (Exhibited: Salon of 1876)
- "Le Récit " (Exhibited: Salon of 1876)
- "Partie de Tonneau" ("Playing the Game of Tonneau") (1877) (Reproduced:dictionnaire des contemporains 1893)
- "Officiers scrutant l'horizon" ("Officers Looking at the Horizon") (1877)
- "Mort du Général d'Elbée" ( "Death of General d' Elbée") (Exhibited: Salon of 1878) (Musée de Noirmoutier )
- "Pas de Braise" (Exhibited: Exposition Nancy, 1878)
- "Un Chouan" (1878–1879)
- "Henri de la Rochejacquelin" ("Henry dela Rochejacquelin") (Sold in Auction:1879)
- "Le Guide (breton)" ("The Guide (Breton)") (1879) (Reproduced: La Chronique des Arts et de la Curiosité N°7 15 fév.1879)
- "Un Poste de Chouans" (Reproduced: éf: La Chronique des Arts et de la Curiosité N°7 15 fév.1879)
- "Le Bataillon Carré, Affaire de Fougères 1793" ("The Battalion Square, An Affair at Fougeres, 1793") (Exhibited: Salon of 1880, Exposition Universelle, 1889)
- "Le Gué (la Traversée du)" (1880)
- "La Bataille de Coulmiers"(1880) (Reproduced: La Chronique des Arts et de la Curiosité N°7 14 fév.1880)
- "Le Duel" (1881)
- "Un Chouan" (1881) (This much reproduced work has appeared on the cover of a number of books on the Vendee campaign.)
- "Le Courrier des Bleus" ("Couriers of le Blues") (1882)
- "Exécution du Général de Charrette" (Execution of General Charette) (1883) (Reproduced: dictionnaire des contemporains 1893)
- "Sorcier breton" (1883)
- "Le Dîner de l'Equipage" ("Dinner of the Crew") (1884)
- "Le Combat de Fère-Champenoise" (Musée de Troyes)
- "Le Signal" (1886) (Reproduced: Le Correspondent 1886)

== Public collections with works by Le Blant ==
- Musée de Mulhouse, France (Le Retour du Regiment)
- Musée de Nantes, France (Le Mort du Général d’Elbe)
- Musée de Troyes, France (Le Combat de l’Affaire Champenoise)
- National Gallery of Australia, New South Wales (formerly possessed Le Bataillon carré)
- Lee Library, Brigham Young University, Provo, Utah (current Le Bataillon carré)

== Illustrated works ==
- Dumas, Alexandre, Le chevalier de Maison-Rouge, Testard, Paris, 1894 ("The Knight of the Red House," a Novel on the Vendee)
- Balzac, Honoré de, Les Chouans. Paris: Edition Hachette (Novel on Le Vendee)
- Vigny, Alfred de, Grandeur et Servitude Militaire. Paris: Edition Testard
- Larchey, Loredan, Les Cahiers du Capitaine Coignet. Paris: Edition Jouauat ("The Notebooks of Caotian Coignet)
- D'Aurevilly, Barbey, Le Chevalier des Touches Paris: Edition Jouauat, Dessins De Julien Le Blant, Gravés Par Champollion
- Strahan, Edward, ed., Society of French Aquarellists, Goupil et cie, 1883 (Society of French Watercolorists)
- Marburg, Theodore, In the Hills, G.P. Putnam's Sons, 1924 (Book of poems on the American Civil War and the Great War)
