= Ruinart =

French champagne house

Coordinates: 49.2447932°N 4.0522903°E

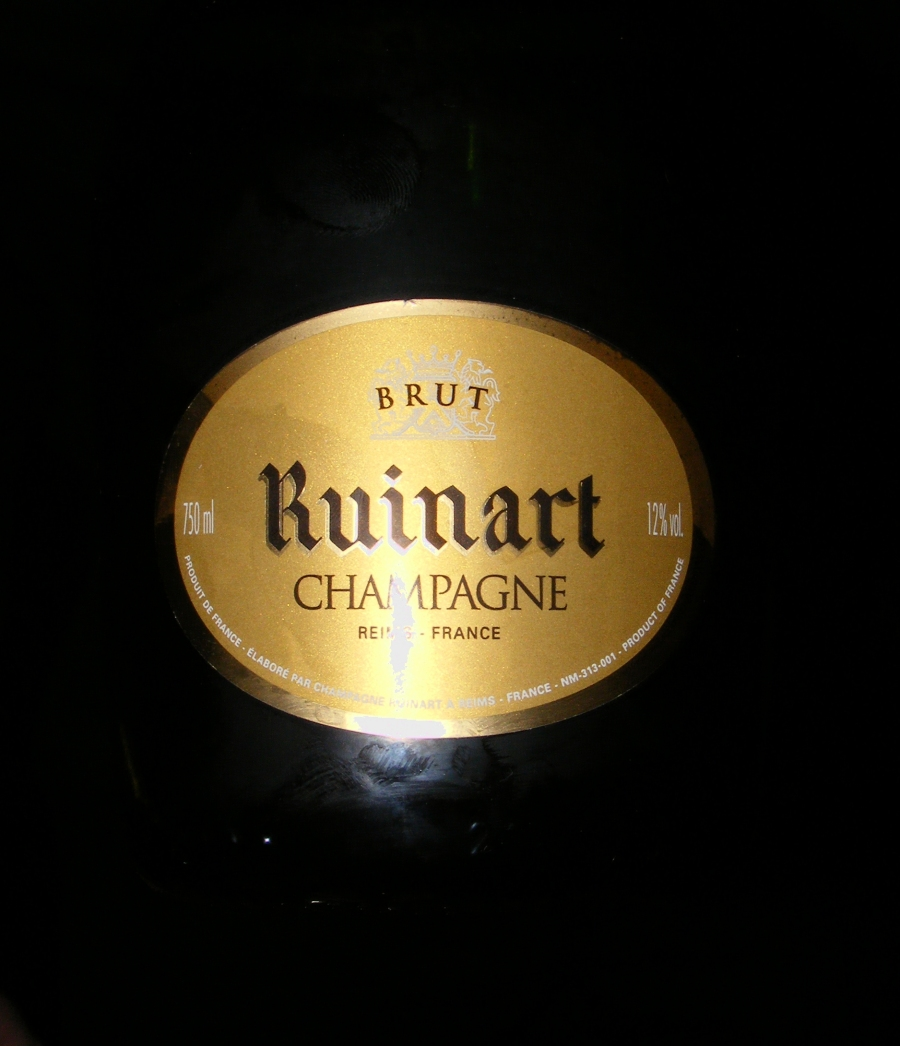
Bottle of Ruinart champagne

Ruinart (pronounced [ʁɥinaːʁ]) is the oldest established champagne house, exclusively producing champagne since 1729. Founded by Nicolas Irénée Ruinart in the Champagne region in the city of Reims, it is currently owned by LVMH Moët Hennessy Louis Vuitton SA.

== History ==
"Seven Generations of Ruinart," an advertisement for Ruinart published in The Wasp, January 20, 1906

An entrepreneur, Nicolas Irénée Ruinart realized the ambitions of his uncle, Dom Thierry Ruinart: to make Ruinart an authentic Champagne house. In the period immediately following the 1728 edict of Louis XV, which authorized the transport of wine in bottles, the house was established. Prior to this edict, wine could only be transported in barrels, which made it impossible to send Champagne to distant markets, and confined consumption primarily to its area of production.

Nicolas Ruinart founded the House of Ruinart on 1 September 1729. The first delivery of “wine with bubbles” went out in January 1730. At first the sparkling wine was a business gift for cloth purchasers, as Dom Ruinart’s brother was a cloth merchant, but six years later Maison Ruinart terminated its cloth selling business due to success in the Champagne business.

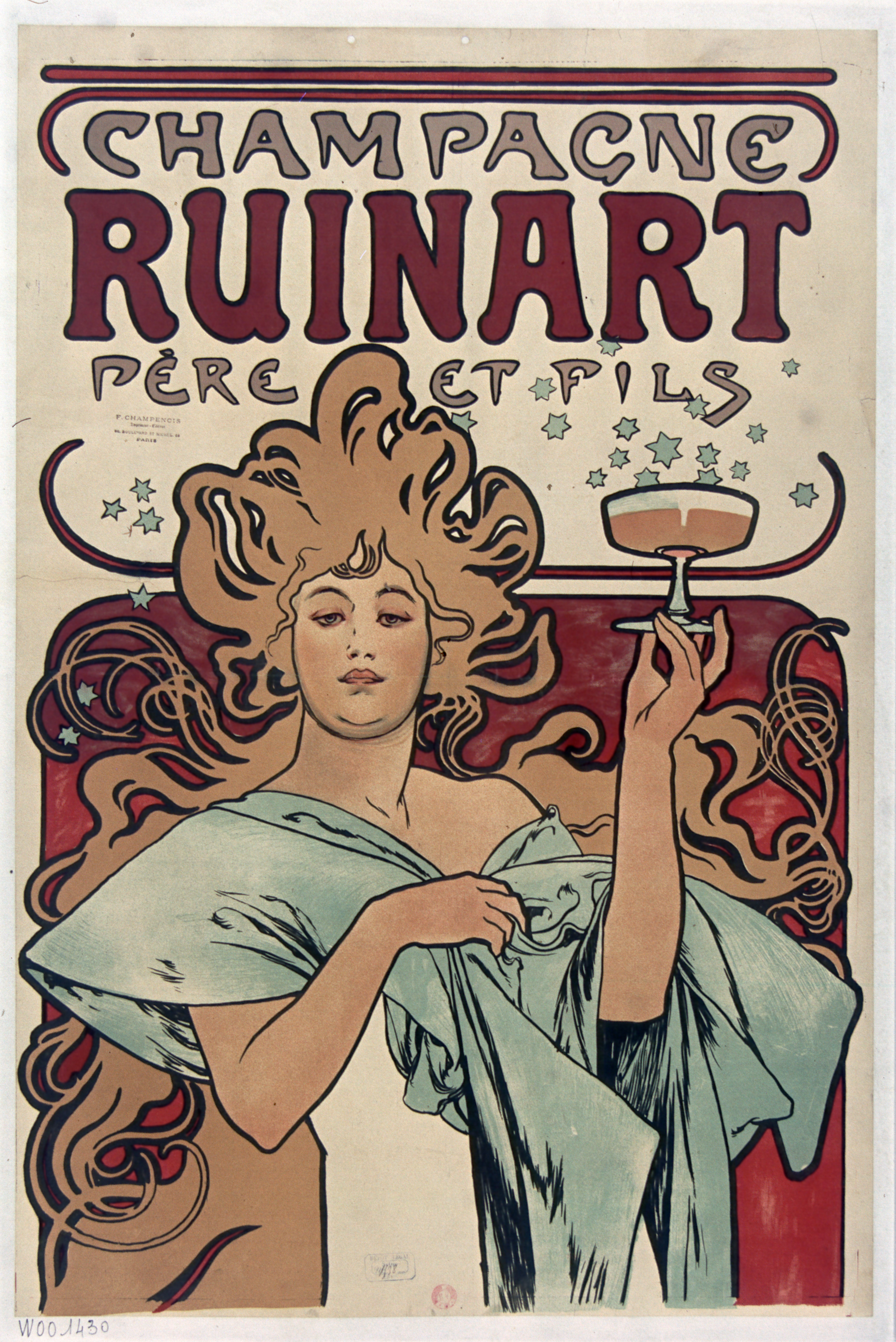
Poster by Alphonse Mucha (1896)

Ruinart has had a long-standing relationship with the Arts. In 1895, Andre Ruinart asked Czech artist Alphonse Mucha to illustrate a poster of Ruinart. Today the brand is still closely involved with contemporary art and plays a role in numerous international events including ARCO, the Foire de Bale, the Carre Rive Gauche, London Design, and Miami Art Basel.

India Mahdavi created the "Champagne Spoon" bottle stopper in 2006, Christian Biecher, created the "Flower" bottle stopper in 2007, Patricia Urqiola, designed the "Fil d'Or" bottle stopper in 2010 and Maarten Baas, named "Designer of the Year" at Art Basel Miami 2009, created the "Bouquet de Champagne" in 2008 and the "Melting" ice bucket in 2010.

== Production ==
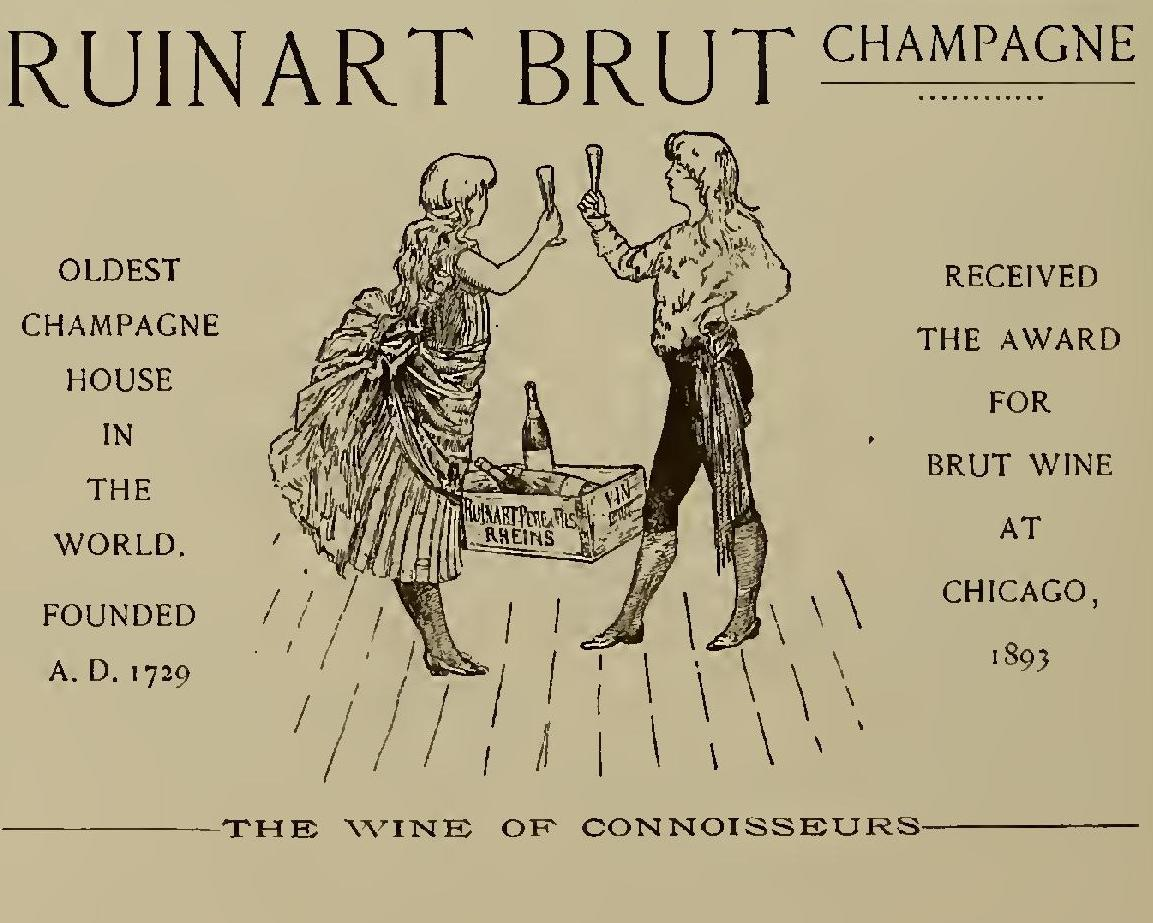
1896 Ruinart Brut Champagne ad in the United States

Of the prestige cuvées, Dom Ruinart is a blanc de blancs, i.e. made entirely of Chardonnay, and was first released with the 1959 vintage. The Dom Ruinart Rosé, first released in 1962, resembles the Dom Ruinart Blanc de Blancs with the addition of 16% vinified red Pinot noir. Ruinart Blanc de Blancs is the flagship of Maison Ruinart.

The cuvées named R de Ruinart include both Brut non-vintage and vintage wines, with the non-vintage minimum 40% Chardonnay, and 60% Pinot noir, with 25% reserve wines, while proportions vary in the vintage wine. Also produced are non-vintage Ruinart Blanc de Blancs, 100% Chardonnay, and Ruinart Brut Rosé, typically 45% Chardonnay and 55% Pinot noir.

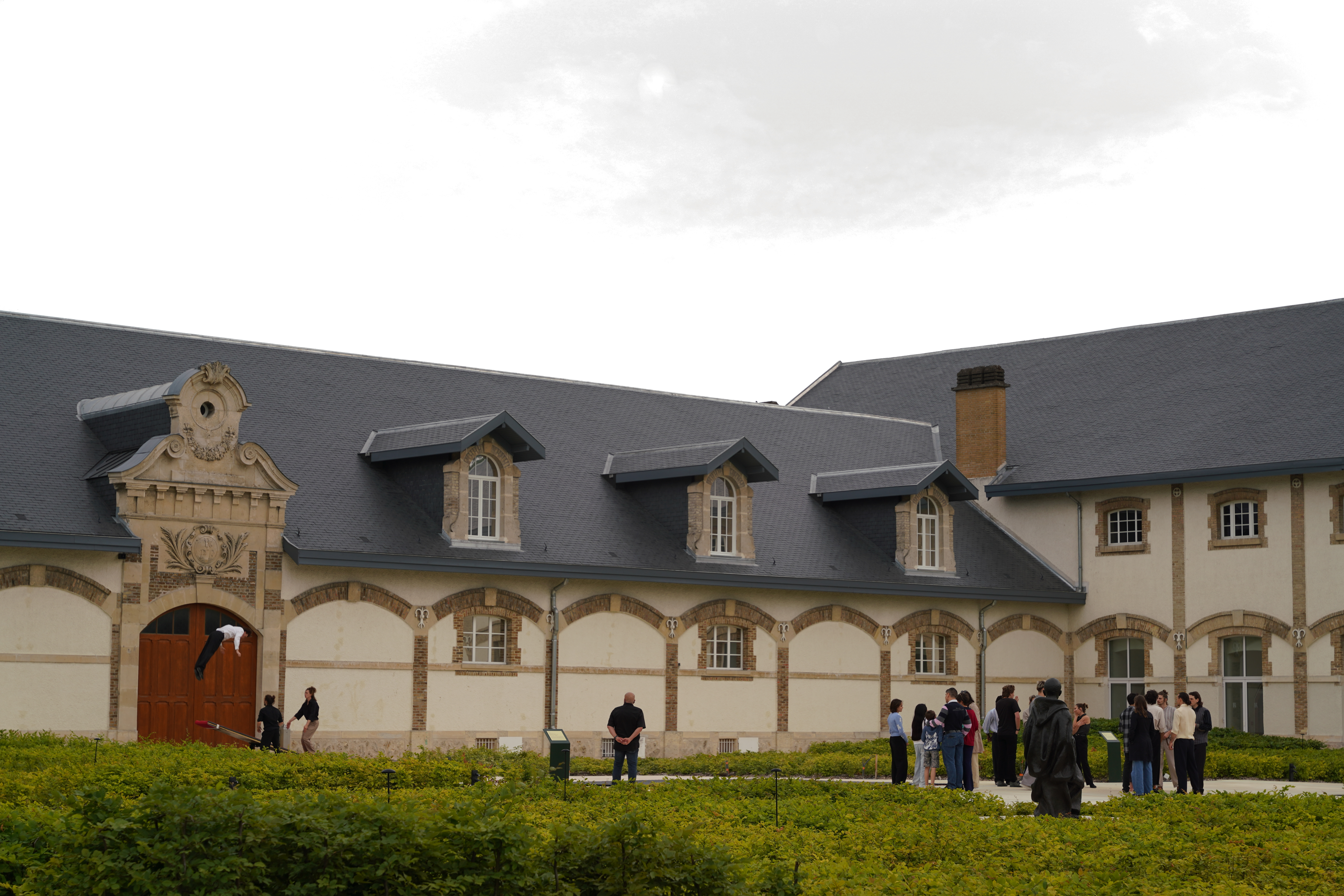
Courtyard at the Jardin Ruinart

Ruinart's cellars, acquired in 1768, are amongst the largest in the region, and are Gallo-Roman in origin. Like most Champagne cellars, they are the product of ancient chalk mining, and extend 38 metres below the ground and are 8 km long. The chalk helps to keep the cellars at a constant 11 degrees Celsius. The chalk pits were classified as a historic monument in 1931. The Ruinart taste is greatly dependent on the aging in chalk pits: three to four years for non-vintages, and nine to 10 years on average for a vintage Ruinart.

The Ruinart bottle is inspired by the first champagne bottles of the 18th century.

== See also ==
- List of Champagne houses
