= Nicolas Irénée Ruinart =

French entrepreneur, founder of the Ruinart champagne house

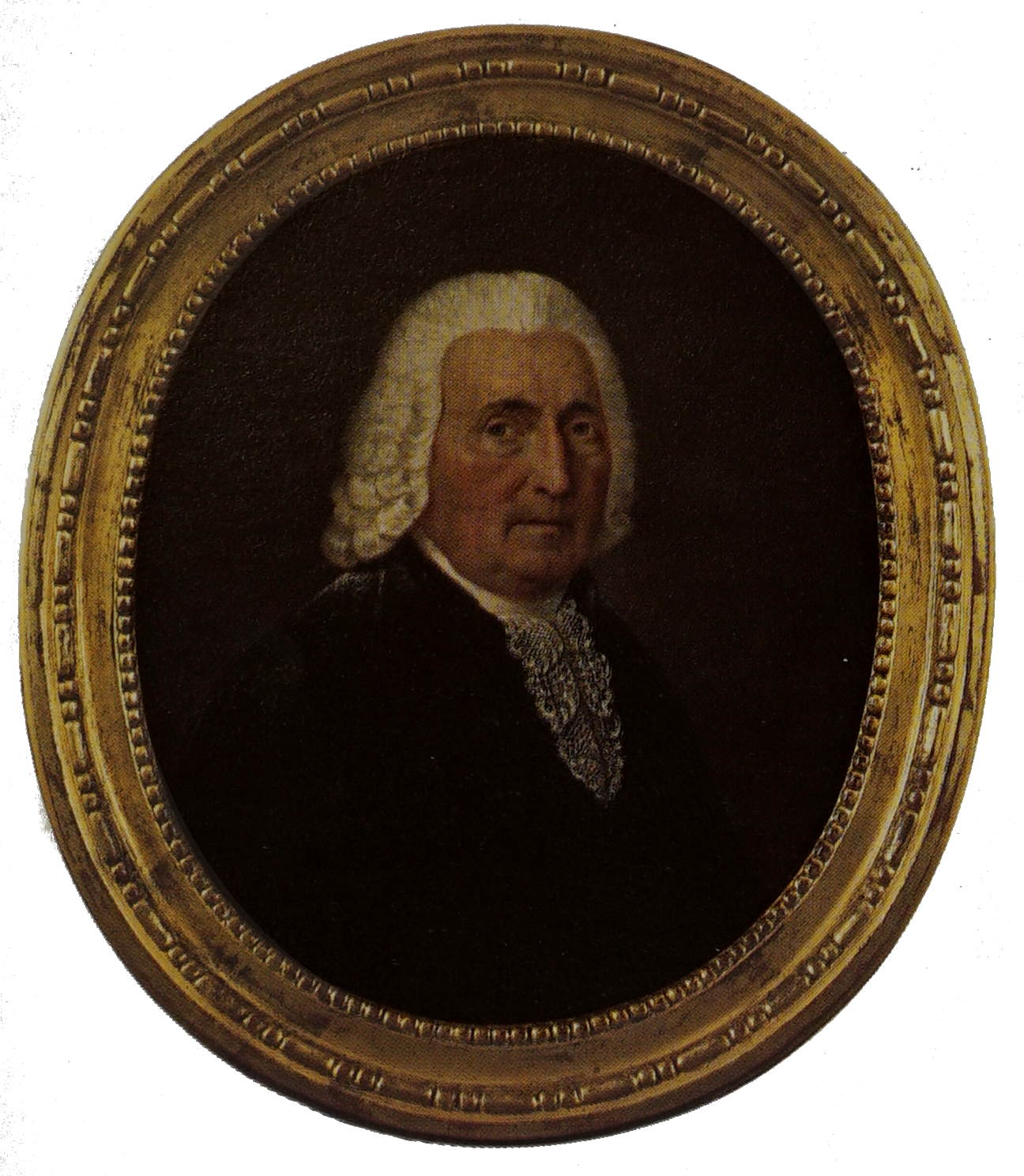
- Born: 4 April 1697; Reims, France
- Died: 21 April 1769 (aged 72); Reims, France
- Occupations: Draper; entrepreneur
- Known for: Founder of Ruinart

Nicolas Irénée Ruinart (4 April 1697 – 21 April 1769) was a French draper and entrepreneur from Reims, best known as the founder—in 1729—of Ruinart, widely regarded as the first "house" organized specifically for the production and trade of champagne.

== Early life and family ==
Ruinart was baptized on 4 April 1697 at the Église Saint-Michel in Reims (Saint-Michel parish). He was the son of Nicolas Ruinart (1652–1734), a cloth merchant and judge consul of Reims, and Barbe Misson (1660–1714). He married Marie Saubinet (Saint-Symphorien parish, Reims). Among their children was Claude Ruinart de Brimont (1731–1798), who became avocat, échevin (alderman) of Reims, and administrator of the Hôtel-Dieu.

Ruinart was the nephew of the Benedictine scholar Dom Thierry Ruinart (1657–1709), whose erudition and early familiarity with sparkling wines influenced Nicolas’s later enterprise.

== Career ==
=== Founding of Maison Ruinart ===
On 1 September 1729, Ruinart entered in his account book the founding charter of Maison Ruinart in Reims, establishing what is recognized as the first Champagne house devoted to sparkling wine. This development followed a key royal decree — the "Arrêt du Conseil d’État" of 25 May 1728 — which authorized the transport of Champagne wines in baskets of bottles, facilitating large-scale distribution through Norman ports such as Rouen.

In its early years, Ruinart gave bottles of “vin de Champagne” as gifts to clients of his family’s cloth business. Growing demand soon led him to abandon textiles entirely and focus on wine by about 1735.

=== Cellars, expansion and innovations ===
By the mid-18th century, the house began storing wines in ancient chalk quarries (crayères) beneath Reims, whose stable temperature and humidity made them ideal for maturation. These cellars lie within the UNESCO World Heritage zone of the Saint-Nicaise hill.

Maison Ruinart’s ledgers record a shipment on 14 March 1764 of an œil-de-perdrix (pale rosé) wine to Germany, regarded as the first documented example of rosé champagne in history.

== Death and legacy ==
Before his death, Nicolas Ruinart transferred control of the enterprise to his son Claude Ruinart de Brimont, who expanded its operations and secured its position in Reims. Nicolas Irénée Ruinart died in Reims on 21 April 1769. Ruinart is generally credited with creating the first commercial champagne house (1729), establishing a model for dedicated bottle-fermented production and global export that defined the modern industry. The maison’s early use of crayères and its documentation of rosé production are considered milestones in the development of champagne. Maison Ruinart remains active today as part of LVMH.

== See also ==
- Champagne (wine)
- Thierry Ruinart
- Reims
- LVMH Moët Hennessy Louis Vuitton
- Champagne hillsides, houses and cellars
