= Edmond-Frédéric Le Blant =

French archaeologist and historian

Edmond-Frédéric Le Blant (12 August 1818, Paris – 5 July 1897, Paris) was a French archaeologist and historian. He was the father of the military artist Julien Le Blant.

== Biography ==
Having received his qualifications to practice law, le Blant obtained in 1843 a situation in the customs under the Finance Board. This position assured his future and he was free to follow his scientific inclinations. During a voyage through Italy (1847) he visited the Kircher Museum, and his intercourse with G. B. de Rossi determined him to undertake in France the scientific work which the founder of Christian archeology had undertaken in Rome.

In 1872, le Blant resigned his post as sub-commissioner of the customs, continuing to devote himself to his studies. In 1883 he became director of the École française de Rome.

== Works ==
As early as 1848 Le Blant was commissioned to collect the inscriptions of the earliest days of Christianity in Gaul, and like de Rossi, he made an investigation of manuscripts, printed books, museums, churches, and the Gallo-Roman cemeteries. In 1856 appeared the first volume of his "Recueil des inscriptions chrétienne des Gaules antérieures au VIIIe siècle". The second volume of the work (Paris, 1865) obtained for its author his election as a member of the Académie des Inscriptions et Belles Lettres. A third volume appeared in 1892 under the title of "Nouveau Recueil". He wrote learned articles on the method of Christian epigraphy, on Christian art, on the origin, progress, popular beliefs, and moral influence of Christianity in ancient Gaul.

He tried to gather into one "Corpus" the Christian sarcophagi of which so many have been preserved in the south of France. In 1878 he published in Paris his "Etudes sur les sarcophages chrétiens de la ville d'Arles", which was followed by a second work "Etudes sur les sarcophages chrétiens de la Gaule" (Paris, 1886). In the introduction he treats of the form, ornamentation, and iconography of these monuments; he dwells upon the relationship between the sarcophagi of Arles and those of Rome, and the difference between them and those of the south-west of France, in which he finds more distinct signs of local influence. His studies and his personal tastes led him to take an interest also in the history of the persecutions and the martyrs.

In numerous writings he treats in particular of the judicial bases of the persecutions and the critical value of the Acts of the Martyrs. These studies were crowned by his work "Persécuteurs et Martyrs" (Paris, 1893), in which he displays his knowledge of history and his deep Christian convictions.

In addition, le Blant collaborated with Jacquemart on several works:

- Histoire artistique, industrielle et commerciale de la porcelaine (Paris, 1862)
- Manuel d'épigraphie chrétienne (Paris, 1869)
- Les Actes des martyrs, Supplément aux Acta sincera' de Dom Ruinart (Paris, 1882)
