= Blantyre (estate) =

1902 cottage in Western Massachusetts, US

Coordinates: 42.33613°N 73.25891°W

Blantyre is one of the grand Berkshire "cottages" put up during the Gilded Age in Western Massachusetts. Built in 1902 by Robert Paterson, a wealthy New York City businessman, it is named for his mother's ancestral home in Scotland.

== History ==
After Paterson's death, his widow sold Blantyre Cottage in 1925, at which point it became a clubhouse for a golf course that had been built on the property. In 1938, Hollywood film director D.W. Griffith purchased the property, thinking it might become a movie studio, although that idea was never realized.

In 1944, Henry and Babette de Sola Mendes purchased Blantyre from the Lenox National Bank and converted the property into a hotel for the area's many summer visitors, including concertgoers and performers at Tanglewood, the summer music festival which had been established in 1940. Conductor Leonard Bernstein stayed there several times, and in more recent years Yo-Yo Ma and John Williams have stayed ay Blantyre as well. Guests also included parents of campers at Watitoh, a summer camp that the Mendes family had established in nearby Becket, Mass.

Henry Mendes sold Blantyre in the 1960s, after which it passed through several hands until in 1980 it was purchased by Jack and Jane Fitzpatrick, owners of the Red Lion Inn in Stockbridge, Mass. The Fitzpatricks added many amenities, converting Blantyre into a luxury resort. Later, the Fitzpatricks’ daughter, JoAnn Fitzpatrick Brown, took over its management, continuing in that role until her death in 2016.

In June 2017, Blantyre was purchased by Linda Law, a Silicon Valley entrepreneur and real estate developer, for $8 million. Blantyre's restaurant features cuisine from Michelin star chef Daniel Boulud.

== See also ==
- Blantyre, South Lanarkshire
