= Rock Ridge (Monterey, Massachusetts) =

Historic house in Massachusetts, United States

- U.S. National Register of Historic Places
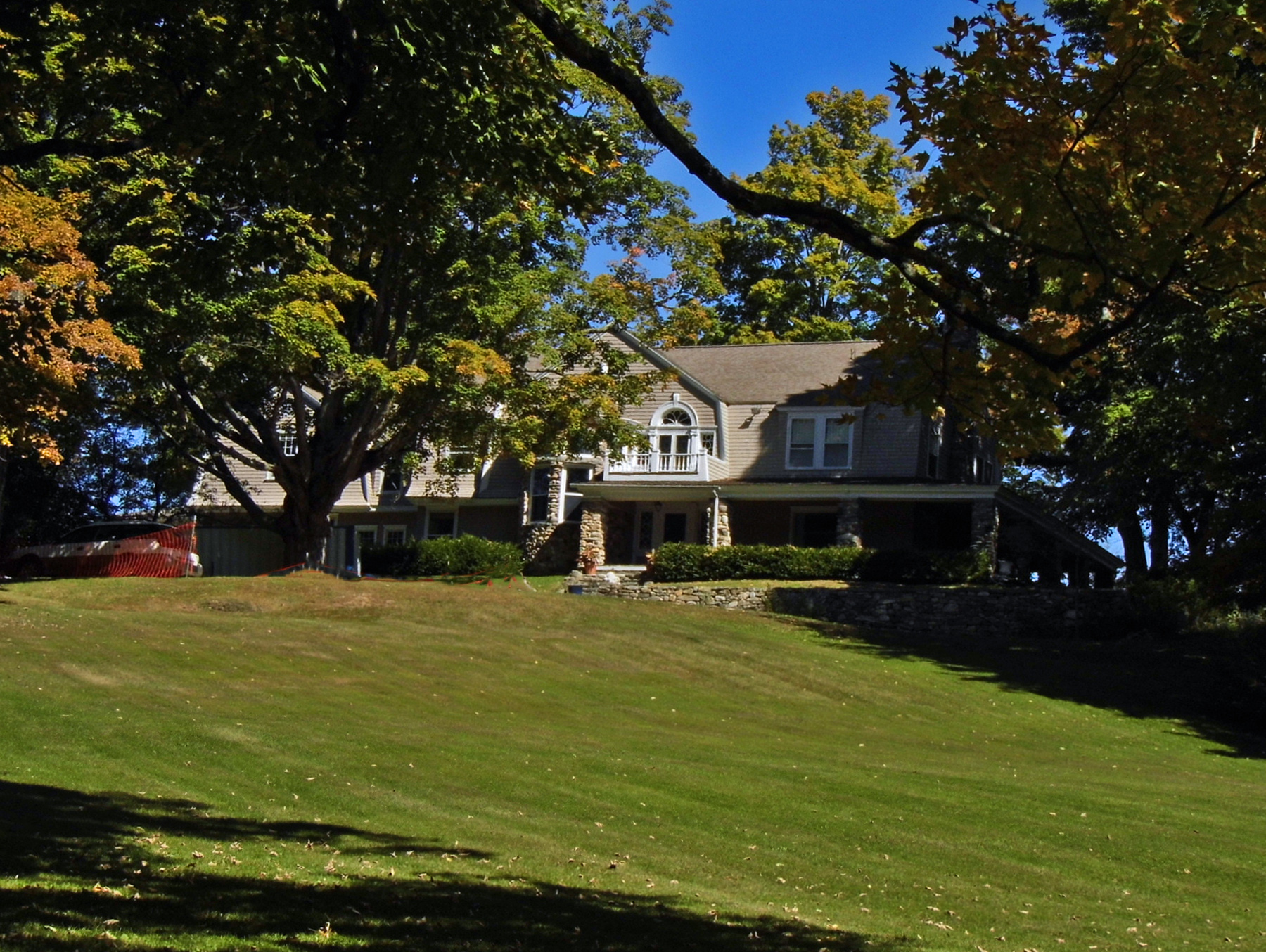

- Location within Massachusetts Location within the United States
- Location: 48 Tyringham Rd., Monterey, Massachusetts
- Coordinates: 42°11′8″N 73°13′19″W
- Built: 1898
- Architect: Patton, Norman; Brewer, C.R.
- Architectural style: Shingle Style
- NRHP reference No.: 83000569
- Added to NRHP: September 16, 1983

Rock Ridge is a historic house at 48 Tyringham Road in Monterey, Massachusetts. Built in 1898, it is a well-preserved example of a turn-of-the-20th-century summer estate house. The Shingle style house was built in 1898 for Curtis Judd, an Illinois businessman who had grown up in the area. The house was listed on the National Register of Historic Places in 1983.

== Description and history ==
Rock Ridge is set on a knoll about 0.5 miles (0.80 km) north of the village of Monterey. It is a 2 1/2-story wood-frame structure, with a rubblestone foundation and an exterior clad in a combination of stone, wooden clapboards, and wooden shingles. It asymmetrical in layout with a gambrel roof, a conical turret, and an expansive porch wrapping around a large part of the house. The interior is virtually unaltered from its period of construction, including original wood finishes and wallpaper. Outbulidings on the property include a period carriage barn.

The house was built in 1898 to a design by Illinois architect Norman Patton for Curtis Judd, a Chicago businessman who had grown up in nearby Lee. The home was judged one of the finest summer estate houses in The Berkshires at the time, and is one of a small number of such houses to survive in Monterey. It has generally been a private summer residence, but was for several years the Lake Garfield Inn.

== See also ==
- National Register of Historic Places listings in Berkshire County, Massachusetts
