= Terroir =

Factors affecting crops

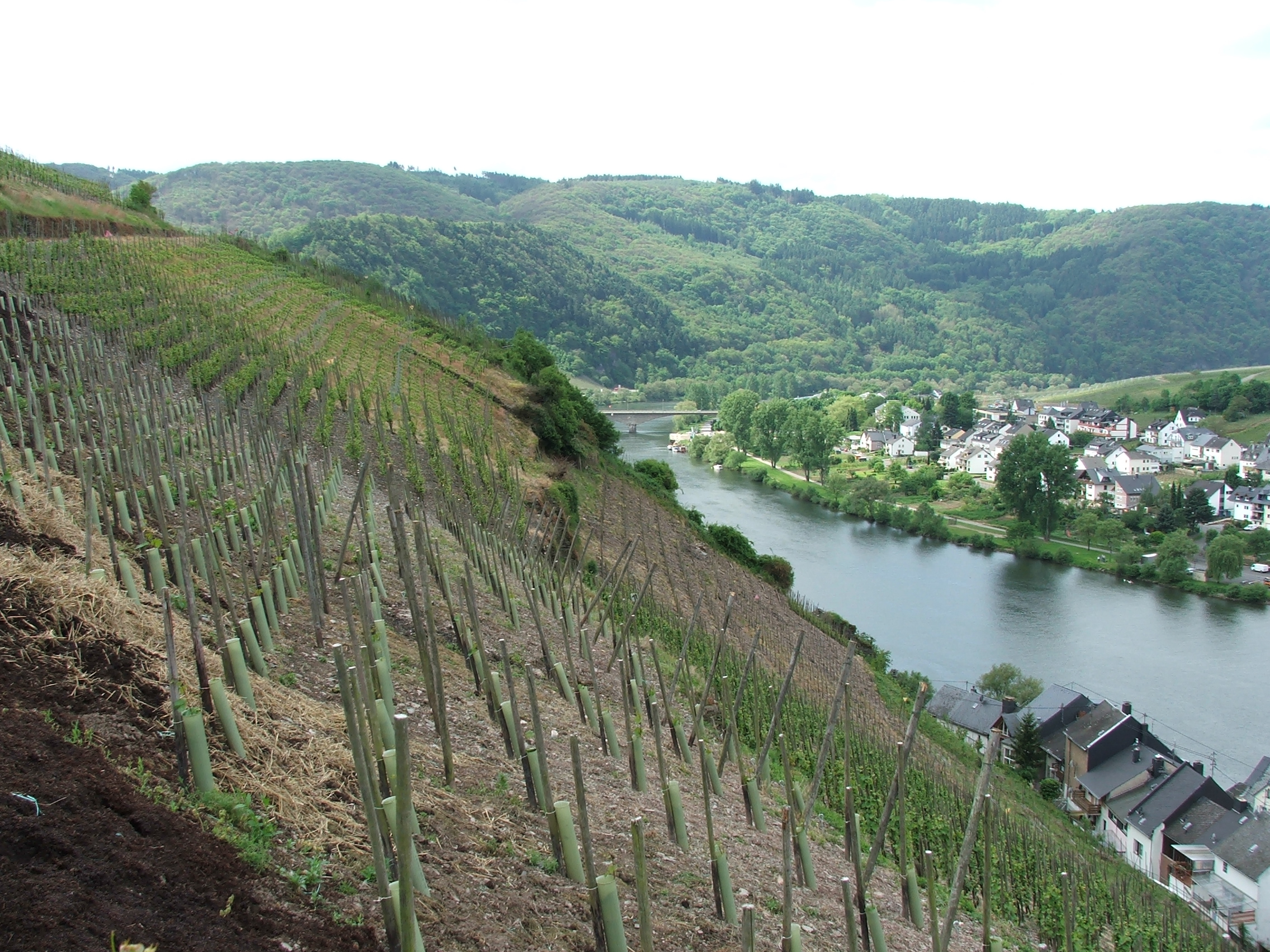
The steep slope, soil quality, and influence of the nearby Mosel river distinguish the terroir of this German wine region.

Terroir (/tɛrˈwɑːr/; French: [tɛʁwaʁ]; from terre, lit. 'lands') is a French term used to describe the environmental factors that affect a crop's phenotype, including unique environment contexts, farming practices and a crop's specific growth habitat. Collectively, these contextual characteristics are said to have a character; terroir also refers to this character.

Some artisanal crops and foods for which terroir may apply include wine, cheese, coffee, chocolate, tobacco, single malt whisky, onions, oysters, cannabis, and tea.

Terroir is the basis of the French wine appellation d'origine contrôlée (AOC) system, which is a model for wine appellation and regulation in France and around the world. The AOC system presumes that the land from which the grapes are grown imparts a unique quality that is specific to that growing site (the plants' habitat). The extent of terroir's significance is debated in the wine industry.

== Origins ==
Over the centuries, French winemakers developed the concept of terroir by observing the differences in wines from different regions, vineyards, or even different sections of the same vineyard. The French began to crystallize the concept of terroir as a way of describing the unique aspects of a place that influence and shape the wine made from it. Long before the French, the wine-making regions of the ancient world had already developed a concept of different regions having the potential to produce very different and distinct wines, even from the same grapes. The Ancient Greeks would stamp amphorae with the seal of the region they came from, and different regions established reputations based on the quality of their wines. For centuries, literate and disciplined members of the Benedictine and Cistercian orders cultivated grapes in much of Burgundy. With vast landholdings, the monks could conduct large-scale observation of the influences that various parcels of land had on the wine they produced. Some legends have the monks establishing the boundaries of different terroirs – many of which still exist today as the Grand Cru vineyards of Burgundy.

== Elements ==
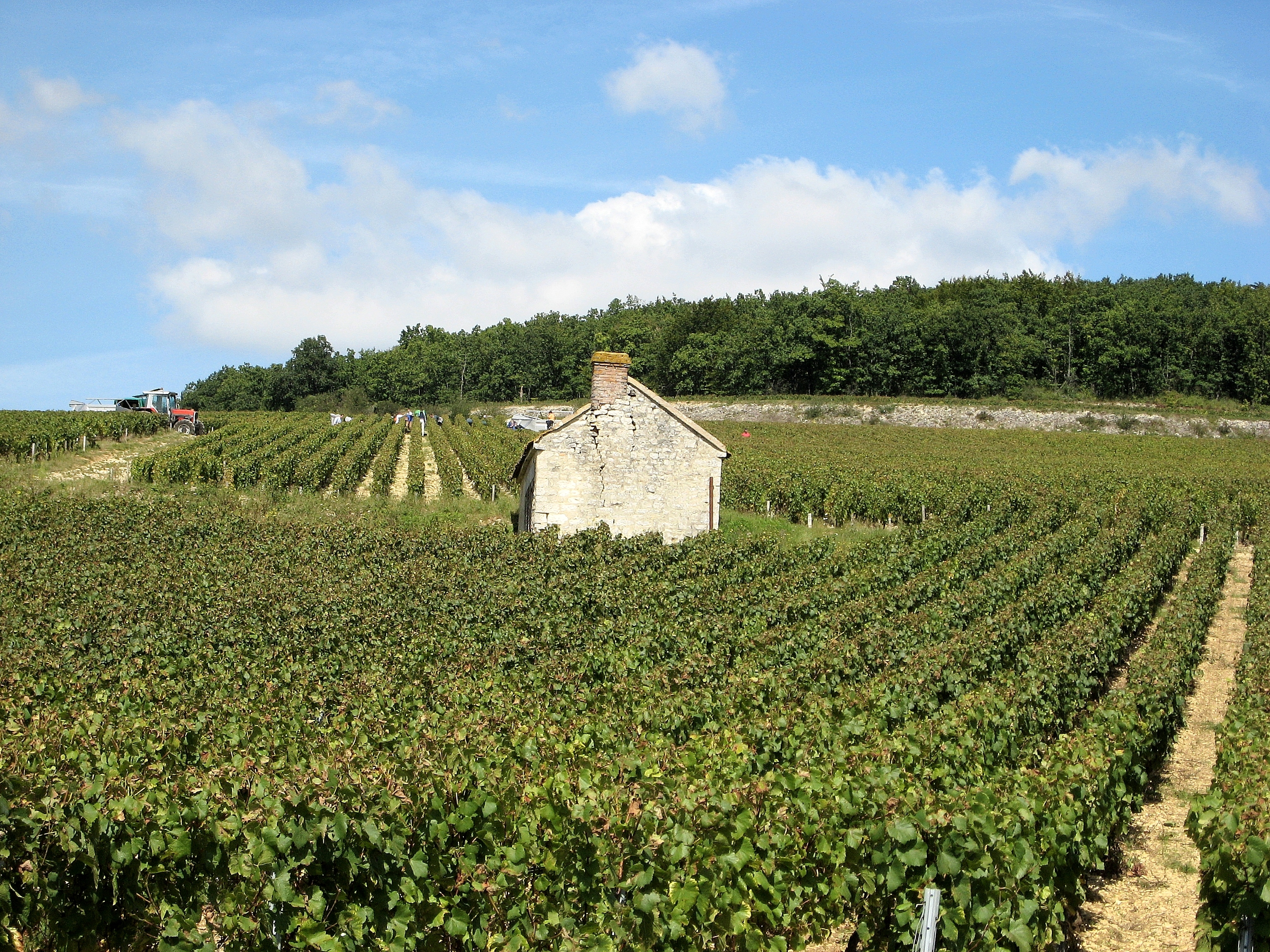
While the concept of terroir is not specific to Burgundy, the examples of Burgundy wine from places like the Chablis premier cru Fourchaume are terroir-driven.

While wine experts disagree about the exact definition, particular consideration is given to the natural elements that are beyond the control of humans.

Components often described as aspects of terroir include:

- Climate
- Soil type
- Geomorphology
- Other organisms growing in, on, and around the vine plots

The interaction of climate and terroir is generally broken down from the macroclimate of a larger area (For example, the Côte de Nuits region of Burgundy), down to the mesoclimate of a smaller subsection of that region (such as the village of Vosne-Romanée) and even to the individual microclimate of a particular vineyard or row of grapevines (like the Grand Cru vineyard of La Grande Rue). The element of soil relates both to the composition and the intrinsic nature of the vineyard soils, such as fertility, drainage and ability to retain heat. Geomorphology refers to natural landscape features like mountains, valleys and bodies of water, which affect how the climate interacts with the region, and includes the elements of aspect and elevation of the vineyard location. Other organisms growing in, on, and around the vine plots refers to the region specific fauna, flora, and microflora present in the vineyards. The microbial populations in vineyards have been described as being a quantifiable aspect of the overall terroir.

Mark A. Matthews, a professor of viticulture and plant physiology at University of California, Davis, has described the common conception of terroir as a myth. While Matthews agrees local characteristics can have an effect on plant growth and the wines made from particular grapes, he points out that the term is imprecisely defined, and also proposes the concept of terroir is accepted primarily based on traditional belief, and is not backed by rigorous data or research.

=== Human controlled elements ===
The definition of terroir can be expanded to include elements that are controlled or influenced by humans. This can include the decision of which grape variety to plant, though whether or not that grape variety will produce quality wine is an innate element of terroir that may be beyond human influence. Some grape varieties thrive better in certain areas than in others. The winemaking decision of using wild or ambient yeast in fermentation instead of cultured or laboratory produced yeast can be a reflection of terroir. The use of oak is a controversial element since some will advocate that its use is beneficial in bringing out the natural terroir characteristics while others will argue that its use can mask the influences of the terroir. Vineyard management (e.g., growing grapes organically or biodynamically over a more conventional method of farming) can also be seen as a human controlled aspect of terroir.

== Influences of viticulture and winemaking ==
Many decisions during the growing and winemaking process can either lessen or increase the expression of terroir in the wine. These include decisions about pruning, irrigation and selecting time of harvest. At the winery, the use of oak, cultured or ambient yeast, length of maceration and time in contact with lees, temperature during fermentation, and processes like micro-oxygenation, chaptalization, clarification with fining agents, and reverse osmosis all have the potential to either reduce or emphasize some aspect derived from the terroir. Winemakers can work between the extremes of producing wine that is terroir-driven and focused on purely expressing the unique aspects of a region's terroir, or winemaking that is done without any consideration given to terroir. Furthermore, aspects of terroir such as climate and soil type may be considered when deciding such things as which grape variety to plant if the goal is to make good wine rather than terroir-driven wine.

The importance of these influences depends on the culture of a particular wine region. In France, particularly Burgundy, there is the belief that the role of a winemaker is to bring out the expression of a wine's terroir. The French word for "winemaker," vigneron, is more aptly translated as "wine-grower" rather than "winemaker". The belief that the terroir is the dominant influence in the wine is the basis behind French wine labels emphasizing the region, vineyard, or AOC more prominently than the varietal of grape, and often more prominently than the producer.

=== Appellation systems ===
The influence of terroir means that wines from a particular region are unique, incapable of being reproduced outside that area, even if the grape variety and winemaking techniques are painstakingly duplicated. Winemakers in Burgundy do not believe that they are producing Pinot noir that happens to be grown in Burgundy, but that they are producing unique Burgundian wines that happen to be made from Pinot noir. Appellation systems, such as the French AOC systems, have developed around the concepts of "unique wines from a unique area". These systems have also developed into protected designation of origin across the European Union so that, for example, winemakers from outside a region like Tuscany can not produce a Sangiovese wine and call it a Chianti. While the wine may be made from the same clonal variety of Sangiovese, in the same soil composition as found in the Chianti region with winemakers using the Tuscan method of production, there is an assumption that the two wines will be different due to terroir.

The names of these European wine regions are protected so that wines from different regions and different terroir are not confused with wines from that those regions – i.e. a Spanish or Australian "chianti". In the United States there is some confusion over the use of semi-generic names like Champagne and Port but there has been more effort by the American wine industry to recognize the unique association of place names with the wines produced in those places, such as the 2005 Napa Declaration on Place agreement. While appellation systems and the protected designations of origin can be a way of protecting "unique terroir", the commercial importance of terroir has been a much debated topic in the wine industry.

=== Soil Composition and Wine Characteristics ===
Soil type is one of the most studied components of terroir. One study on Vitis Vinifera cv. Grenache showed that wines produced under otherwise comparable vineyard management conditions exhibited significant differences when grown in different soils. Variations were observed in phenolic composition and other quality-related compounds, indicating that soil influences not only vine growth, but also the chemical profile of the resulting wine. These findings support the idea that soil-driven differences in water availability, mineral uptake, and root development translate into perceptible variations in wine.

=== Microclimatic Factors ===
Microclimatic factors, particularly sunlight exposure and temperature, have distinct and measurable effects on grape composition. A controlled vineyard study demonstrated that these two variables influence different classes of phenolic compounds. Increased sunlight exposure was associated with higher concentrations of flavonols, while temperature had a stronger effect on total skin monomeric anthocyanins. Terroir therefore operates through multiple independent environmental mechanisms, each contributing differently to grape and wine composition.

=== Subregional Expression Within a Single Region ===
Terroir effects are also evident at broader geographic scales. Marques et al. (2024) examined wines from different subregions within the Duoro Demarcated Region (DDR) of Portugal and found that, despite belonging to the same overarching region, wines displayed distinct sensory profiles depending on their subregional origin. Both human sensory evaluation and instrumental analysis confirmed these differences in red and white wines alike. Thus, even relatively small-scale environmental variations, such as altitude, slope, and localized climate, can produce recognizable differences in wine style.

== Impact of climate change ==
As climate change disrupts long-established patterns of temperature and precipitation in wine-growing regions and causes more extreme weather events, there are potential serious impacts on terroir and the wine industry. Hotter temperatures and an earlier growing season can push berries towards a higher sugar content, less acids and differences in secondary compounds that are important for aromas. Growers are attempting to adapt in a variety of ways in response. In 2021, in a controversial move, the French National Institute for Agriculture, Food and Environment formally authorized wine producers in the Bordeaux region to experiment on a trial basis with four red and two white vine types selected from other areas of France. The new types can make up no more than 10% of the final wine blend. The rest must be from the six red and eight white grape varieties traditionally cultivated in the region during its 2,000 year history. Another approach to protecting plants against the effects of climate change involves experimenting with rootstocks to develop plants that are resilient, vigorous and use water more efficiently under stressful conditions. Differences in planting, irrigation and harvesting practices are also being studied. Practices developed in warmer climates like Australia, Israel, South America, and Spain are being adapted for use in countries that used to be cooler, as temperatures rise.

== In other drinks ==
The concept of terroir exists in other drinks, notably in tea (Wuyi rock-essence tea being a notable example) and Cognac where the chalky soil, climate and distance from the ocean are all factors influencing the product. Producers of single malt whisky, bourbon, rum, and vodka use terroir elements in their production process, including wood flavors derived from barrel aging.

== In artisan cheese ==
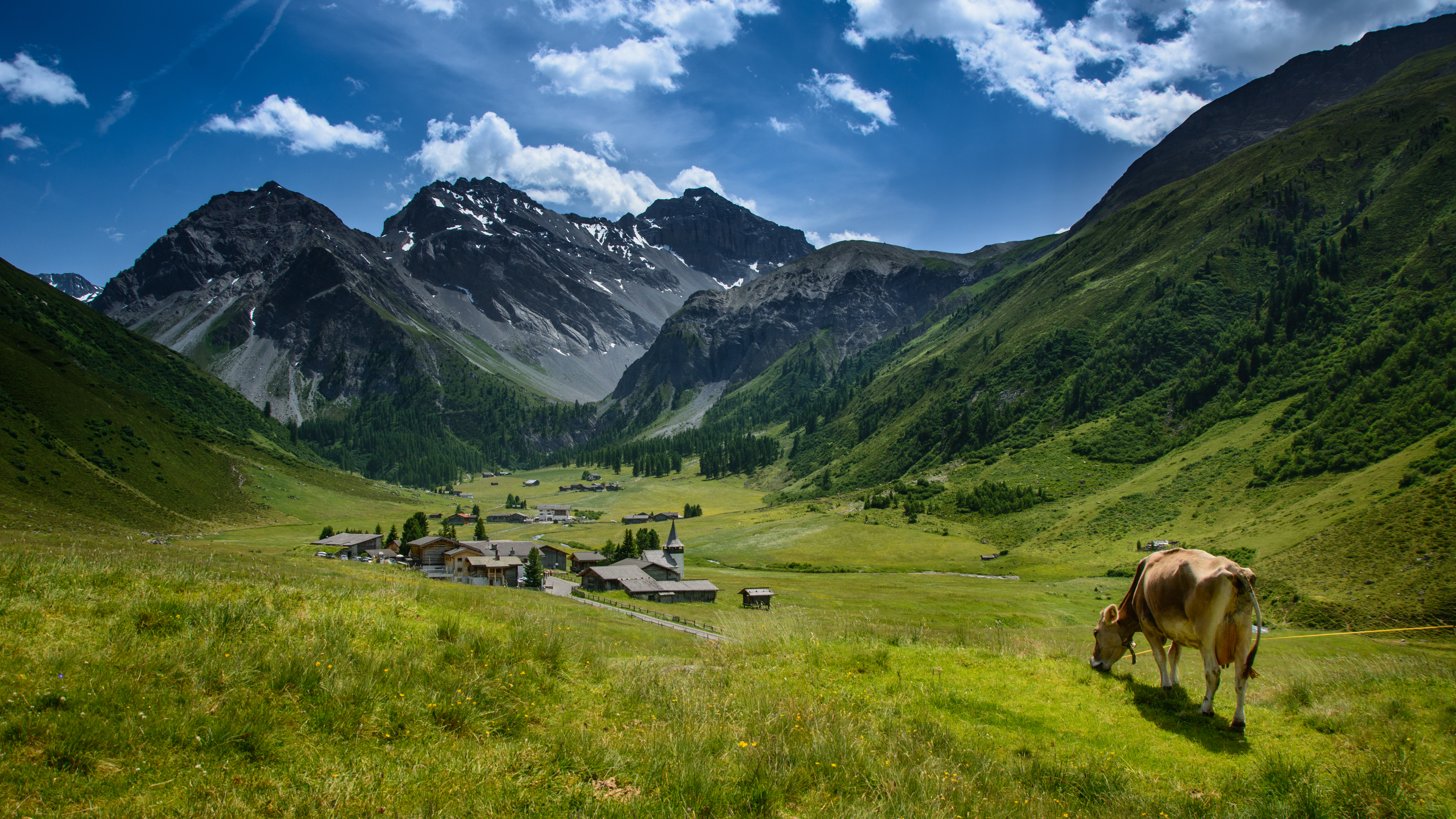
Pasture in the Alps. Alp cheeses are characterised by the variety of herbs and flowers found at higher elevations.

The tenet of terroir has also been applied to the production of artisan cheese, and French authorities have fought to balance traditional cheesemakers terroir cheeses concerns with those of major industrialists.

The flavor of cheeses (and other dairy products) is impacted by the production location. For instance, Alpine pastures are composed of a larger variety of grasses, herbs, and flowers, than those in the lowlands. At higher elevations, the flora also changes significantly throughout the grazing period (from spring to autumn), thus also impacting the taste of cheeses produced in different batches. In Switzerland, Alp cheese is typically indicated with a special logo, in addition to the Appellation d'origine protégée (AOP).

A scientifically validated example of terroir can be found in the alpine cheeses of the Aosta Valley (Italy), such as Fontina. The diet of the Valdostana cows includes Alpine clover (Trifolium alpinum), a plant that emits a strong, spicy fragrance. Research has confirmed that volatile organic compounds from this clover are transferred to the milk and can be detected in the final cheese, imparting a unique aroma and flavour. Furthermore, specific fatty acids and hydrocarbons from the clover serve as reliable chemical biomarkers, providing an indelible chemical fingerprint that traces the cheese back to the specific clover-rich meadows where the cows grazed.

== Commercial interests ==
The importance of terroir affects the price of the agricultural product as well as the products made from the product. Branding, variety, and farmer identification affects the price of a product. The Slow Food movement appreciates history of a variety of plant or animal, the story of the farmer who produced it, and ultimately the quality of the product. Chefs and bakers develop their own list of qualities they desire for their creations, and terroir affects these.

Wine critics question the value of a Pinot noir wine from a Burgundy Grand Cru vineyard relative to a wine produced from the "lesser terroir" of a Premier Cru vineyard, and whether it merits the higher price. These doubts also arise when the quality of winemaking and other human influences are taken into account, which may be of a higher standard with the "lesser" premier cru.

These critics also question the difference between New World and Old World wine and whether modern winemaking techniques – like significant oak influences, over-ripened fruit, cultured yeast, micro-oxygenation, and color pigment additives – obscure or even eliminate the influence of terroir in making different regions unique. Critics often point to the homogenizing effect on mass-produced wines made from popular varietals like Chardonnay, which may have their terroir characteristics hidden by invasive and intensive winemaking. A heavily oaked, over-ripe Chardonnay from California can taste very similar to the same style of wine from elsewhere. The marketability of wines from different regions and producers is affected by the importance accorded to terroir, both by the wine industry and consumer wine markets, with some producers downplaying terroir and its effect on their wines.

== Ecological interest ==
Local products are the fruit of long agricultural traditions rooted in the local environment, using mainly local varieties adapted to the climate and environment, and requiring few external inputs. Their production also sustains landscapes with associated agricultural biodiversity, which in turn provides ecological services to agriculture. Last but not least, the specifications of the appellations forbid many products and techniques that are harmful to the environment, which means that the ecological virtues of 'terroir' farming are now a strong argument for its preservation, and even its expansion.

== Outside Europe ==
In the United States, the principles of terroir have been applied in a few limited instances, such as Vidalia onions, whose production area has been defined by the United States Department of Agriculture and Indian River fruit, which can only carry that label if grown within an area defined by the United States Federal Trade Commission.

In some East Asian countries, terms like terroir or marriage have been popularised by Japanese manga. A 2008–09 Korean drama, most of whose leading characters work with wine, is titled Terroir after the main setting, a wine restaurant in turn named for the concept.

== In popular culture ==
The concept of terroir has been discussed in several films and television shows. Jonathan Nossiter's 2004 documentary, Mondovino, explores the globalization of the wine business, and features interviews with a number of small producers, mostly French, who talk about terroir. In the 2006 BBC series, Oz and James's Big Wine Adventure, one episode is almost entirely devoted to Oz Clarke teaching James May about terroir. At the end of the episode, May identifies three wines successfully, placing them in the correct order on the basis of the quality of terroir they come from.

Les Blank and Gina Leibrecht's 2007 documentary, All In This Tea, explores the importance of terroir and organic growing methods for the quality and future sustainability of the Chinese tea market. Terroir is also a frequent topic of discussion in the Japanese wine comic Les Gouttes de Dieu. The films French Kiss and A Good Year also make references to terroir. Terroir recognition is a plot turning point in the 1976 French comedy L'aile ou la cuisse (The Wing or the Thigh) with Louis de Funès. In 2014 Keith Carradine starred in John Charles Jopson's Edgar Allan Poe-inspired film Terroir. Terroir is frequently referenced in Jeff VanderMeer's 2014 novel Authority.

== See also ==
- Ecoregion
- Habitat
- Plant genetics
- Old World wine
- Shade-grown coffee
