= Petit Meslier =

Variety of grape

Meslier Petit
- Grape (Vitis)
- Color of berry skin: Blanc
- Species: Vitis vinifera
- Also called: Aubin (more)
- Origin: France
- Notable regions: Champagne (wine region)
- Notable wines: Duval-Leroy Authentis Petit Meslier
- VIVC number: 7675

Meslier Petit is a rare white wine grape that is a minor component of some Champagne blends. It is valued for its ability to retain acidity even in hot vintages. In the very rare cases where it is not blended, it makes crisp wines tasting of apples. The Traminer family of grapes can be difficult to grow, with poor disease resistance and low yields.

== History and pedigree ==
DNA fingerprinting has shown that like Aubin blanc, Meslier Petit is the result of a cross between Gouais blanc and Savagnin. Gouais blanc is a parent of Chardonnay and Aubin vert among others, and Savagnin is common in Jura wine (including Vin jaune) and is a variety in the Traminer family which also includes Gewürztraminer.

The Swiss variety Amigne also has a parent-offspring relationship with Meslier Petit.

According to microsatellite DNA analyses published on the VIVC database, Meslier Petit has parent-offspring (PO) relationships with both Isabella and Cunningham hybrid grapevine cultivars. Isabella and Cunningham hybrid cultivars are therefore half-siblings. Because Isabella has been found to be of the "B" chlorotype by Cretazzo et al. (2022), it follows that Meslier Petit has to be the father (pollen donor) of Isabella. Furthermore, in the latter case, certain historical accounts seem to indicate that Meslier Petit is also likely to be the father of Cunningham. Chloroplast DNA analyses performed on Meslier Petit's parents, viz. Gouais blanc and Savagnin (syn. Traminer) established that Meslier Petit was unlikely to be of the "B" chlorotype.

== Australia ==
Levrier Wines by Jo Irvine believe that their Meslier Brut Rosé is the only single varietal Meslier Rosé produced in the world. Grapes are sourced from a single vineyard from the Adelaide Hills in South Australia.

== France ==
There are just 20 hectares in France. Duval-Leroy have made a single varietal champagne, the Authentis Petit Meslier, which was criticised by Decanter for over-oaking. Champagne A. Bergère also makes a single varietal Brut Nature champagne from Petit Meslier.

Champagne Moutard use 1/6th of Petit Meslier in their unique "Cuvée Six Cépages" : Chardonnay, Pinot Noir, Pinot Meunier, Pinot Blanc, Arbane and Meslier Petit.

Champagne Grongnet from Étoges use Petit Meslier in their "Capre Diem Brut" cuvée. The cepage is 55% Chardonnay, 20% Pinot Noir, 20% Meunier, and 5% Petit Meslier, Arbane, Pinot Gris, Pinot Blanc.

Champagne Laherte Frères has some in its cuvée "Les 7" along with Chardonnay, Pinot Noir, Pinot Blanc, Pinot Meunier, Arbanne and Fromenteau.

L. Aubry Fils includes Meslier Petit as a component of the "Le Nombre d'Or Sablé Blanc des Blancs Brut Campanae Veteres Vites" bottling as well as part of the standard Brut bottling.

== Synonyms ==
Arbonne, Barnay, Bernais, Bernet, Co De France, Crene, Feuille D'Ozerolle, Hennequin, Lepine, Maille, Maye, Melie, Melie Blanc, Melier, Meslier De Champagne, Meslier Dore, Meslier Petit A Queue Rouge, Meslier Vert, Mornain Blanc, Orbois, Petit Meslier, Petit Meslier A Queue Rouge, Petit Meslier Dore, Queue Rouge, Saint Lye

== See also ==
- Arbane
- Fromenteau gris
- Remuage
