= Arbane =

Variety of grape

- Grape (Vitis)
- Color of berry skin: Blanc
- Species: Vitis vinifera
- Also called: Arbanne (more)
- Origin: France
- Notable regions: Champagne
- Notable wines: Moutard-Diligent Vielles Vignes
- VIVC number: 554

Arbane (or Arbanne) is a white French wine grape variety that has been historically grown in the Aube region of Champagne, but has now all but disappeared from the vineyards with less than 1 hectare (2.5 acres) left in France in 2006. Despite its rarity, it is still permitted grape variety to be blended with Chardonnay, Pinot noir and Pinot Meunier and other varieties in the Champagne cuvée.

Recent years have seen a renewed interest in the older, almost extinct grape varieties of the Champagne region, including Arbane. The Champagne house Moutard-Diligent in Buxeuil is the only producer of a "Vieilles Vignes" Champagne made only from Arbane, while a few others, including Champagne Aubry and Drappier, produce blends which include both Arbane and other now rare Champagne varieties such as Petit Meslier and Pinot blanc. Moutard-Diligent also produce a "Cuvée Six Cépages" which uses six of the seven authorized grapes varieties : Chardonnay, Pinot noir, Pinot Meunier, Petit Meslier, Pinot blanc and Arbane; the additional approved grape variety being Fromenteau (Pinot gris).

== History ==
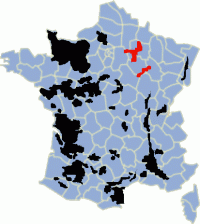
The Champagne wine region (in red) with the Aube region being the southern extension of the wine growing area and home to the Arbane grape.

Arbane has a long history of cultivation in the southern Champagne wine region, particularly around the commune of Bar-sur-Aube. Ampelographers believe that the name Arbane comes from the medieval Latin word albana, which means "white grape" and is still being used a primary name and synonym for several varieties in Italy including the Albana grape in Emilia-Romagna. Arbane has no known connection to the other Albana grapes but the synonym Albane is still used even today for Arbane. It is also speculated by some ampelographers that recorded plantings of an Alban grape in the Les Riceys commune in 1388 may be the earliest mentioning of Arbane. However, Master of Wine Jancis Robinson notes that some ampelographers and wine historians question if the 14th century grape is, indeed, the same variety as the modern Arbane.

Ampelographers do not question that the grape was widely established in Champagne by the turn of the 19th century and was noted in 1801 by Jean-Antoine Chaptal to produce highly regarded wine, along with Fromenteau, in Morveaux near the commune of Baroville.

== Viticulture ==
Arbane is a vigorous but low yielding grape variety that ripens mid to late in the harvest season. The vine produces small bunches of little berries. The main viticultural hazard that afflicts Arbane is downy mildew.

== Wine regions ==
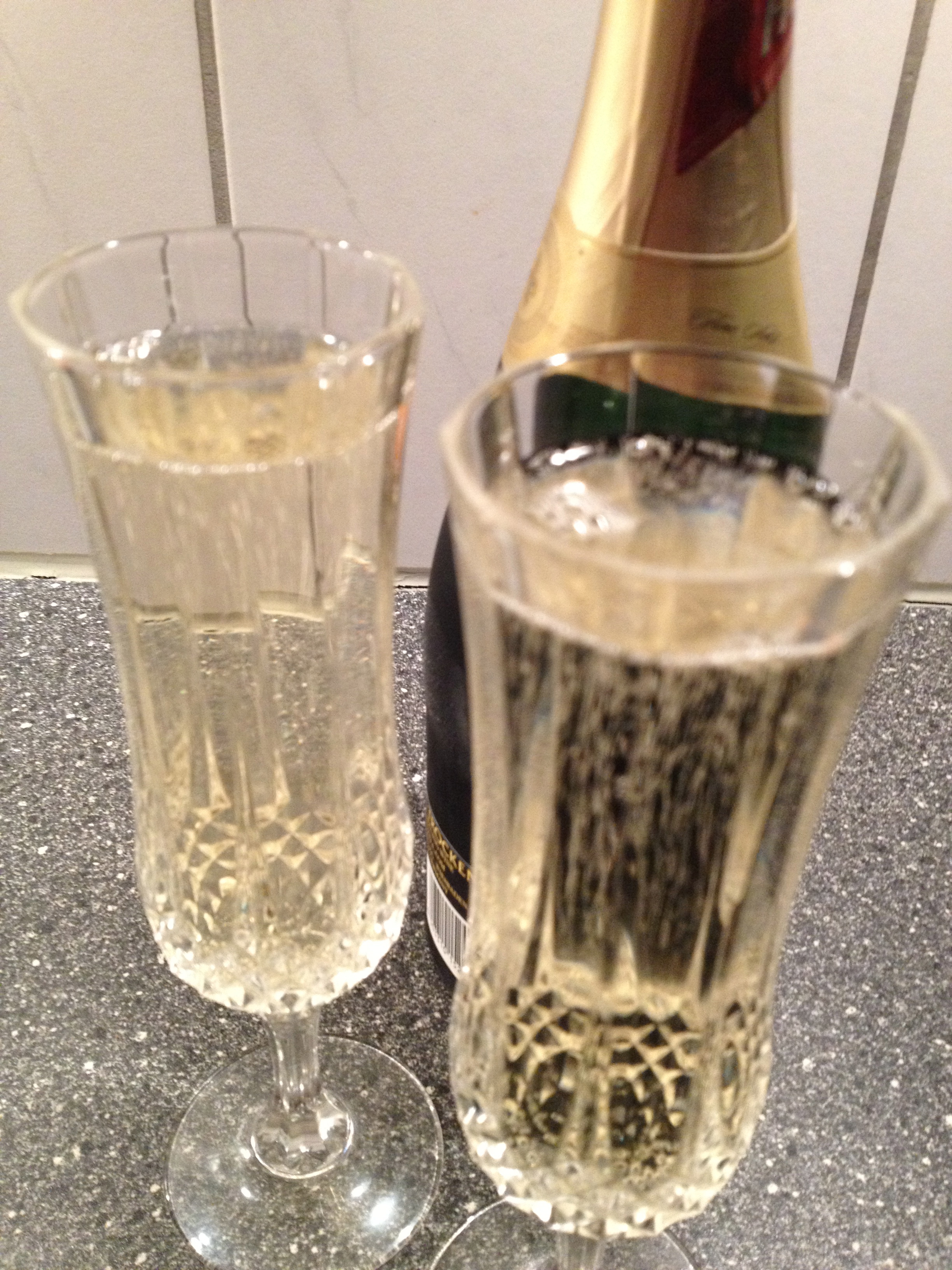
Though rarely used, Arbane is a permitted grape variety in Champagne production.

Though Arbane is a permitted grape variety in Champagne production, it is very rarely used with less than 1 hectare (2.5 acres) of the grape planted throughout France in 2006. Most of these plantings are very old and used by the Champagne house Moutard-Diligent to produce a varietal Vielles Vignes bottling and as part of a separate cuvée that uses six of the seven authorized grape varieties in Champagne—Chardonnay, Pinot noir, Pinot Meunier, Pinot blanc, Petit Meslier and Arbane.

=== AOC regulations ===
While Chardonnay, Pinot noir and Pinot Meunier make up the vast majority of Champagne wine production, Arbane is permitted to be used in regular vintage and non-vintage cuvée (but not Blanc de Blanc which is only made from Chardonnay) provided that the grapes are harvested to a yield no greater than 65 hectoliters/hectare (approximately 4.3 tons/acre) and the finished wine attains a minimum alcohol level of at least 11%.

== Synonyms ==
Over the years Arbane has been known under a variety of synonyms including: Albane (in Aube), Arbane blanc, Arbane du Bachet, Arbanne (in Les Riceys and Moulins-en-Tonnerrois), Arbanne blanche, Arbenne, Arbenne blanc, Arbone, Crène (in Balnot-sur-Laignes, Balnot-la-Grange and Polisot), Crene, Crénillat (La Valla-en-Gier and Rive-de-Gier in Loire), Crenillat and Darbanne (in Aube).
