= Bistrot de Pays =

French federation of rural bistros

Bistrot de Pays sign

Bistrot de Pays (English: Country Bistro) is a non-profit federation of rural bistros in France. The organization's mission is the promotion and preservation of the rural bistro. Members must meet certain criteria to join. As of 2025, there were 125 member establishments in 41 departments across the country.

== Membership ==
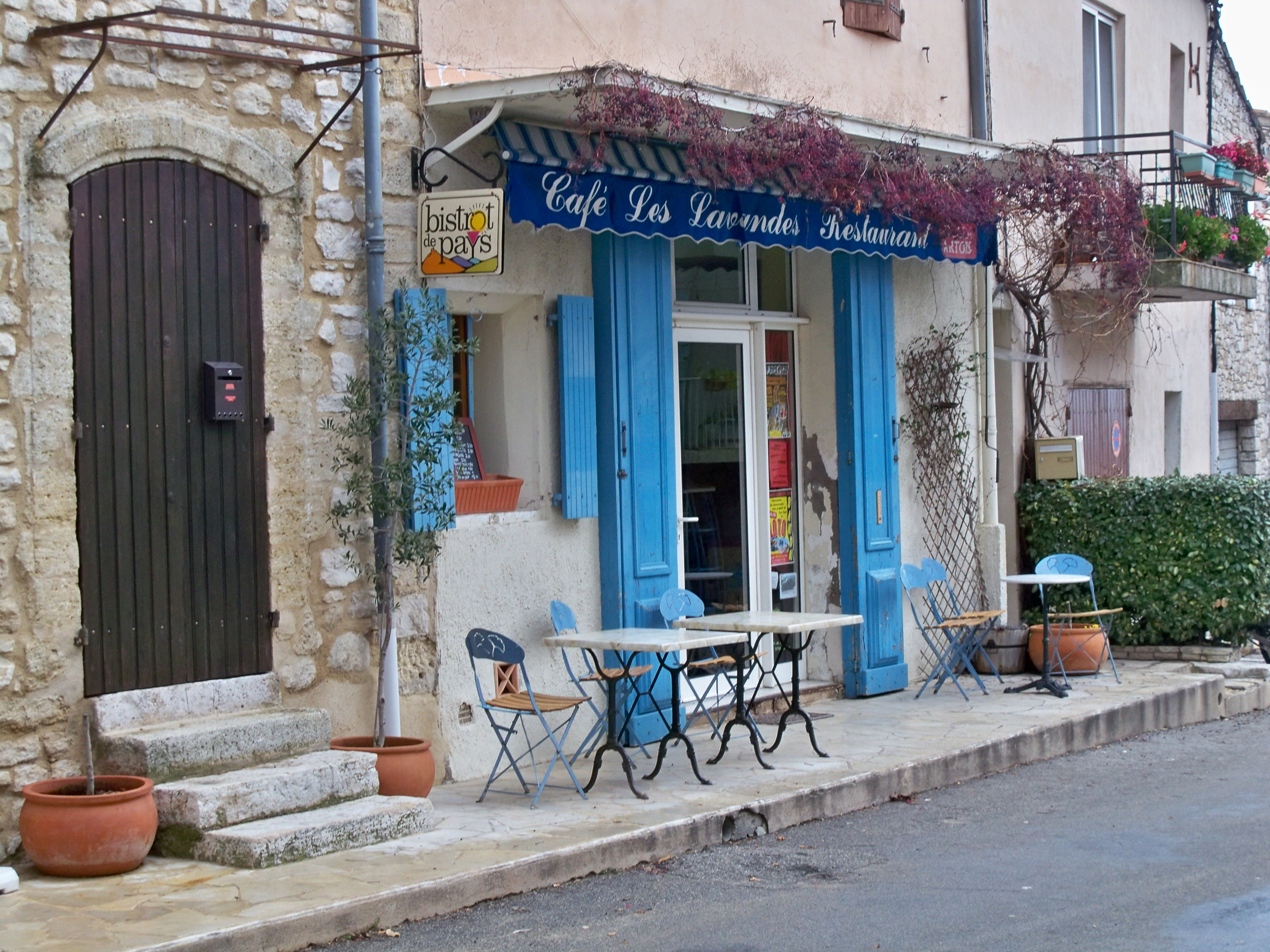
A Bistrot de Pays in Vachères

To qualify, a bistro must be open year-round (i.e. not seasonally), work with local producers, serve fresh produce, and be reasonably priced. Establishments must also be located in a rural area, provide cuisine cooked on the premises, and participate in local community activities. Members display a "Bistrot de Pays" sign above their doors.

== History ==
The Bistrot de Pays program was first launched in 1993 in Southern France, and the national federation (Fédération Nationale des Bistrots de Pays) was established in 2003. A 2005 Le Monde article reported that owners of the bistros underwent 18 months of training, and that the federation had entrusted ECOCERT to perform audits on member establishments.
