= Antoine-Claude-Pierre Masson de La Motte-Conflans =

French man of letters

Antoine-Claude-Pierre Masson de La Motte-Conflans, Or Conflant, born in Vertus in 1727 – died in the same place in 1801 was an 18th-century French man of letters.

A lawyer at the Parlement of Paris, La Motte-Conflans was a member of the Société littéraire of Châlons-sur-Marne.

== Works ==
- 1748: l'Année sans merveille, ou Fausseté de l'année merveilleuse (by abbé Gabriel-François Coyer), Lille;
- 1747: l'Armée du Roi dans la Flandre hollandaise, ode,
- Épitre au Roi sur la paix; Published under the name of an officer from Gascony
- 1747: Epître du magister de Lauffeldt an curé de Fontenoy, in-12°;
- 1747: Étrennes du Parnasse, in-12°;
- 1746: la Gloire de la ville d'Ypres sous le gouvernement français, ode,.

He provided the Encyclopédie by Diderot and D'Alembert, the articles Denier and Épier.

== Sources ==
- Joseph-Marie Quérard, La France littéraire, t. 5, Paris, Firmin-Didot, 1862, 1833, (p. 611).
- Frank A. Kafker, Notices sur les auteurs des dix-sept volumes de « discours » de l'Encyclopédie, Recherches sur Diderot et sur l'Encyclopédie, 1989, Volume 7, Numéro 7, (pp. 125–150)
