= Drappier =

French Champagne house

Coordinates: 48.1696276°N 4.650848°E

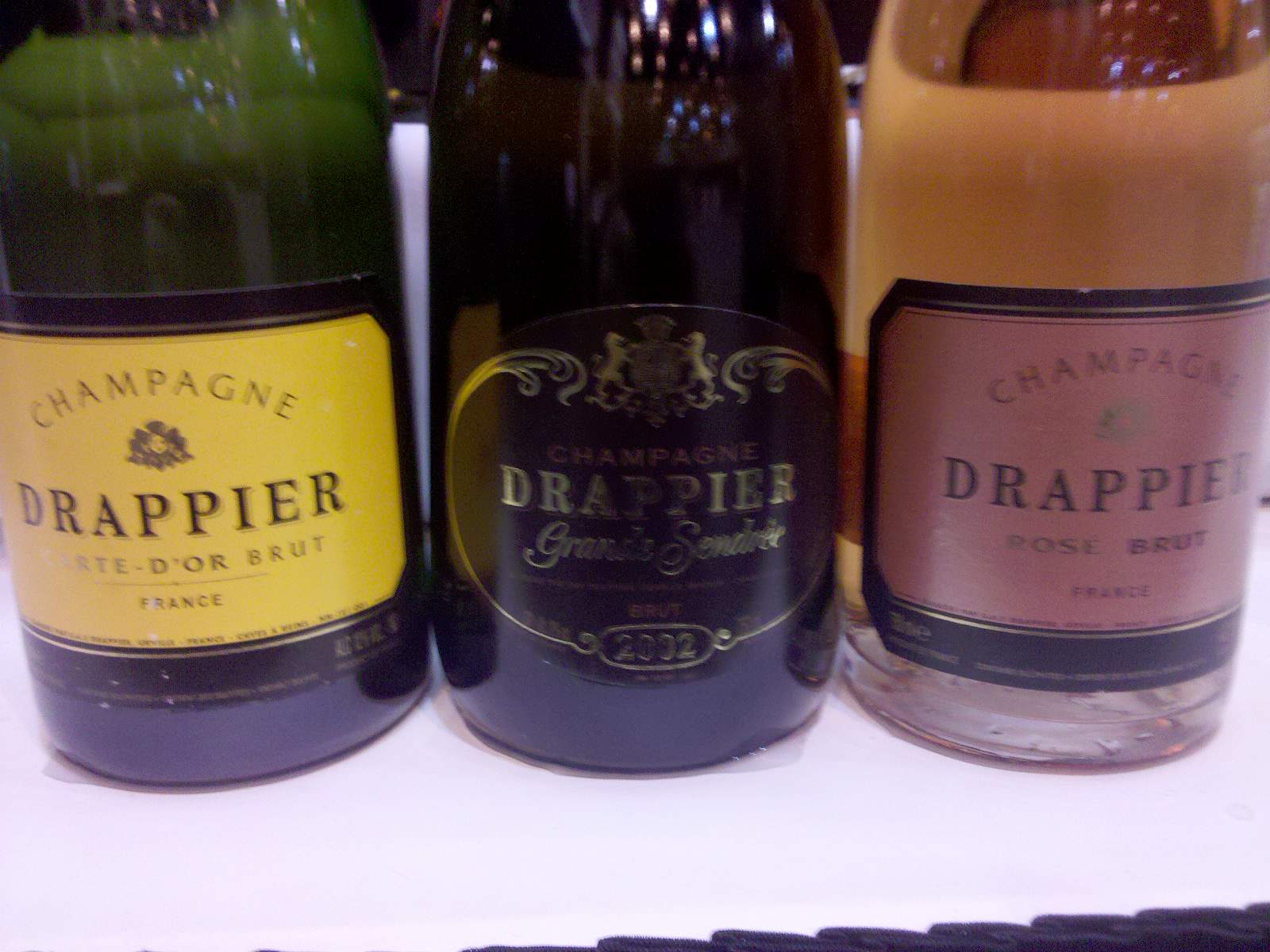
Drappier Champagnes.

Drappier is a Champagne producer based in the Urville region of Champagne. The house, founded in 1808, produces both vintage and non-vintage cuvee as well as a prestige wine known as Grande Sendrée.

Drappier Champagne produces an unsulfured Champagne, Brut Nature Zéro Dosage Sans Souffre NV, a Blanc de noirs.

Drappier produces about 1.6 million bottles of champagne a year.

== See also ==
- List of Champagne houses
