= Duval-Leroy =

French Champagne producer

Coordinates: 48.9076276°N 4.0206545°E

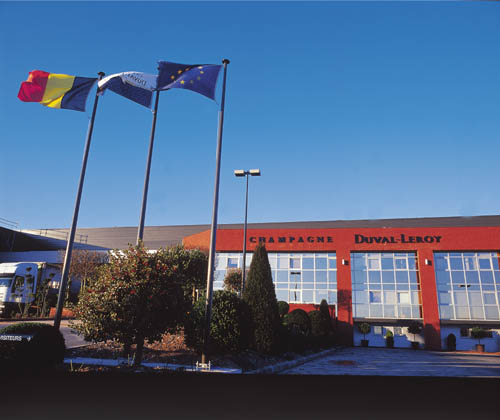
Duval-Leroy Winery in Vertus

Duval-Leroy is a Champagne producer based in Vertus, a village in the Côte des Blancs region of Champagne. The house, founded in 1859, produces both vintage and non-vintage cuvées as well as a line of organic wines. The house of Duval-Leroy is also known for its pioneering role in promoting a sustainable development model for its viticulture.

Founded in 1859 when Edouard Leroy, a wine trader from the town of Villers-Franqueux, formed a partnership with Jules Duval, a grape-grower and winemaker from Vertus, Duval-Leroy comprises 200 hectares (490 acres) of vines under cultivation. This vineyard consists mostly of chardonnay grapes grown in villages classified as Grand Cru and Premier Cru, and pinot noir grapes from villages, also classified as Grand Cru and Premier Cru, in the Montagne de Reims.

Since 1991, and the early death of Jean Charles Duval, the company has been run by his widow, Carol Duval-Leroy. She has presided over the steady growth of the company, and has left her mark on the champagne world as well, becoming, in 2007, the first woman ever to be nominated chairman of the Association Viticole Champenoise (AVC), the champagne region's winemakers association.

“ Fleur de Champagne”, the Duval-Leroy Brut Premier Cru cuvee, and « Femme de champagne », the prestige vintage cuvee made only on exceptional years, are Duval-Leroy's two flagship champagnes.

== History ==
=== 19th century, Jules Duval and Edouard Leroy ===
Duval-Leroy is a family owned business since 1859. It began with the partnership of Mr. Duval and Mr. Leroy in Vertus, a village in the Côte des Blancs.

A few years earlier, a still unofficial ranking of champagne crus had been released, establishing a hierarchy between villages and their terroir. Edouard Leroy a wine merchant from Villers-Franqueux understood the commercial value of such a ranking. Higher quality champagnes, from highly rated areas could be sold for a premium price and insure him a faithful following of demanding customers. If only he could guarantee the constant quality of his champagnes year after year. For this he needed to rely on a trustworthy winemaker with the same concern for quality. That winemaker would turn out to be Jules Duval.

To finalize their partnership they did organize a wedding, between Jules's son, Henri, and Edouard's daughter, Louise Eugénie! This marriage would produce a son, Raymond who would run the house of Duval-Leroy for the better half of the 20th century.

Back then, Duval-Leroy was still trying to make a name for itself in the champagne world by appearing at the numerous World Fairs that were popular at the time. At the 1888 Barcelona World Fair, Duval–Leroy came first in the International Wine Competition. The following years, at Monaco, Moscow, and Paris Universal Exhibitions, Duval-Leroy was recognized for the quality of its champagne.

=== 20th century, from Raymond to Jean Charles Duval-Leroy ===
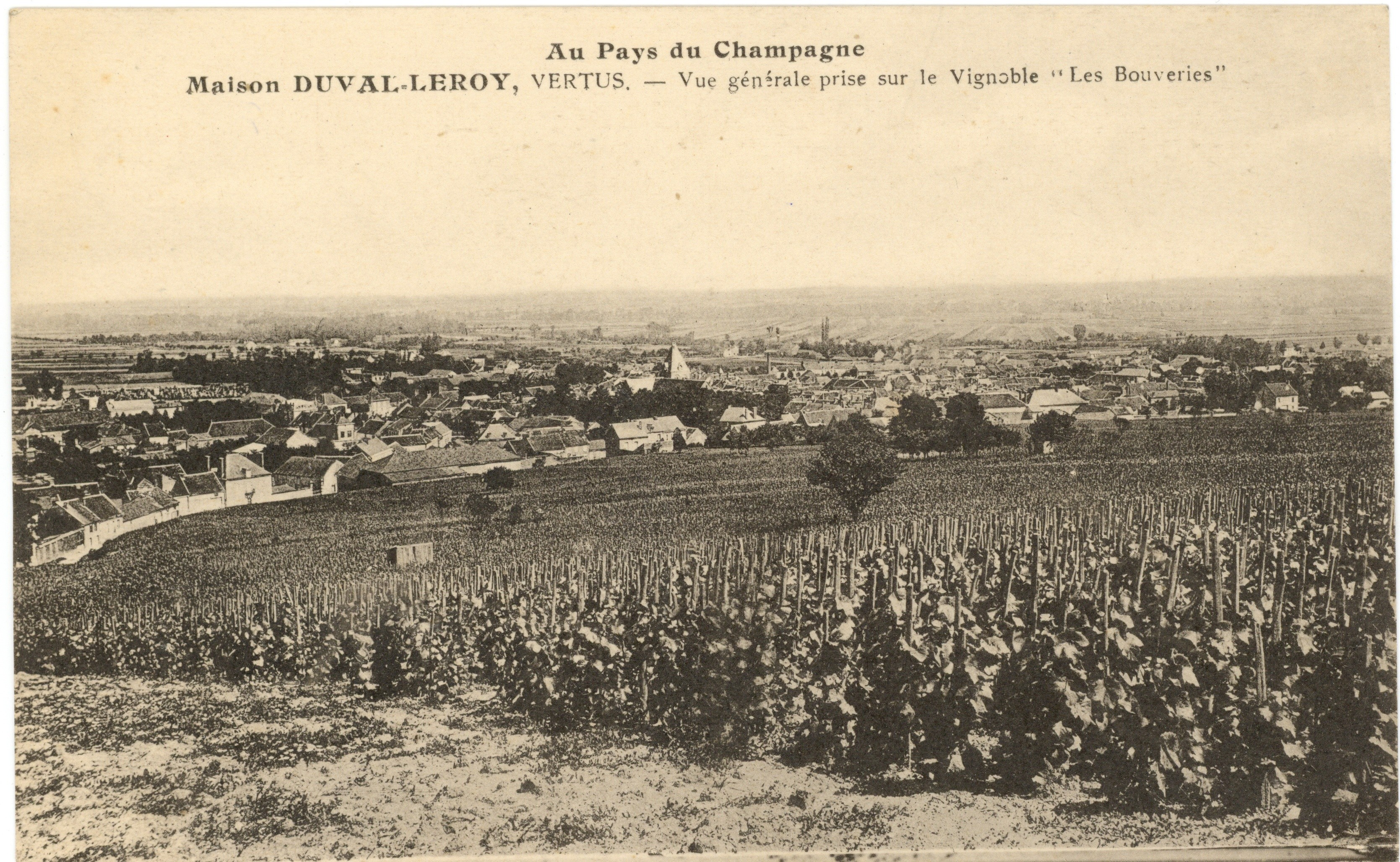
The Clos des Bouveries and the village of Vertus, at the turn of the 20th century

In 1911 the ranking of champagne crus became official, establishing three tier system of “Grands Crus”, “Premiers Crus” and “Crus non classes”. Almost immediately, Raymond who had succeeded his father at the helm of the company, put on the market a new cuvee made exclusively from “premier crus”. It was the very first such cuvee at the time. On first tasting it he found it to have white flower aromas and decided to name it “fleur de champagne” which means “flower of champagne”. The cuvee was an immediate success, and still is, over a century later. In 2012 it won “Best Sparkling Wine” at the Shanghaï IWC.

A figure in Champagne, Raymond held the Legion of Honour for his role in the French army in the First World War.

In the years ahead, Duval-Leroy partook in the growth and misfortunes common to all champagne houses. The region was physically devastated by two wars, twenty years apart. Domains were destroyed, families broken.

When France fell under German occupation, Raymond cut down on production rather than work to see his cellar looted by the nazis. Yearly output fell from one hundred thousand to twenty-five thousand bottles.

After the war, work began anew. Vines that had been torn had to be replanted. Vast areas of the Montagne de Reims were cleared to make room for new vineyards.

In 1950, Charles Roger took over from his father Raymond. He presided over a substantial growth of the company, but kept it as a family operation. Gradually he achieved his goal of getting in his own hand a large enough vineyard to provide a reliable supply of high quality grapes. Eventually he was tapped by his fellow winemakers to become head of the Trader's Union, a position he would hold from 1983 to 1992.

In 1985, as Jean Charles was getting ready to take his turn running the company, the French wine world was undergoing a revolution of sort. Wines from the New World had just made a spectacular entry on to the international market and were challenging French supremacy. New efforts, new thinking and new methods were required from the French winemaking industry to face this challenge. Jean Charles decided it was time for a major upgrade of the Duval-Leroy facilities and line of wines.

He laid down the plans for modernizing the winery, and started thinking about a new prestige cuvee, which in time would become "Femme de Champagne".

Jean Charles Duval-Leroy died of cancer in 1991, at the age of 39, just weeks before work for either projects could be completed. His widow, Carol Duval-Leroy, 35, was left with three young boys, Julien, Charles & Louis, aged eight, six and four, as well as a company to run.

=== Turn of the 21st century: Carol Duval-Leroy ===
Days before he died, Jean Charles had her promise to take care of the company and keep it in the family hands until she could turn it over to their sons.

The modernisation of production processes, the development of traditional distribution channels, the increased product range and expanded exports are all objectives that Carol Duval-Leroy has set for her company.

Carol Duval-Leroy is one of the most dynamic CEOs in Champagne. She received the Legion of Honour and the Order of Leopold. In 2007, she was elected at the head of the Association Viticole Champenoise, a key trade organization.

Born in Uccle, near Brussels, in Belgium, from a Flemish father, and a French speaking mother, Carol Nilens first met jean Charles when she was fifteen. It would take them another fifteen years to unite their destinies.

In the meantime, Carol got a degree in economics, started a career in the real estate business, and traveled to Ibiza and Congo. She enjoyed gastronomy and dreamed of running a high class restaurant. Instead, she found herself at the helm of a champagne house. In September 1991 she threw a large party to mark the inauguration of the new winery, a 70,000-square-foot and three-story-high facility on the edge of the village of Vertus. And incidentally to tell the world that she had decided to take up her husband's challenge, and that the Duval-Leroy company was not for sale. “It turned out to be the best possible remedy for my sorrow” says Carol Duval-Leroy today.

Her first decision was to find a new name for the prestige cuvee envisioned by her late husband. She decided to call it “Femme de Champagne” (Woman of Champagne) as a reminder of the company’s new identity, being run by a woman, and because champagne is naturally thought of as feminine wine. Made from 85% chardonnay and 15% pinot noir, exclusively grown in Grands Crus areas, Femme de Champagne is often described as an elegant and delicate, therefore feminine champagne.

Her second decision was to create a new position in the company. Twenty-three-year-old Sandrine Logette-Jardin, who had just completed her degree in oenology, became “head of Quality control”. Within three years this choice pays off. In 1994, Duval-Leroy became the first house of champagne to be granted the ISO 9002 certification.

Eleven years later, in 2005, Sandrine Logette-Jardin, became head winemaker at Duval-Leroy, the first woman ever to hold such a position in the Champagne region. In 2007, Carol Duval-Leroy was nominated at the head of the AVC, “Association Vinicole Champenoise”, Champagne’s Winemakers’ Association. Another first for the profession and the area. In 2013, Carol Duval-Leroy was named “most influential woman in Champagne” by the RVF, “Revue du Vin de France”. Although she hasn’t been able to fulfill her early dream of running a prestigious restaurant, Carol Duval-Leroy has already published a cookbook, with personal recipes, and special food and champagne pairings, aptly entitled “Femme de Champagne” (Délicéo publishers).

=== 2009: the 150th birthday celebration ===
2009 marked the 150th anniversary of the Duval-Leroy company. Carol Duval-Leroy used that opportunity to modernize the brand’s visual identity, and upgrade the winery facilities. The hyphenated name, that used to stretch on a single line on bottle labels was split over two lines, in a new modern and dynamic logo. The winery, designed twenty years earlier, was expanded again and brought up to par with contemporary environmental requirements.

Gradually, Carol Duval-Leroy’s three sons have joined her and taken up positions within the company. Julien, the eldest is General Manager, Charles handles Communications and Marketing, Louis, the youngest is in charge of public relations. Edouard, a fourth son, born in 1981, from Jean Charles Duval-Leroy’s first marriage, has set up a wine and spirits import business in Shanghai. He’s also Duval-Leroy’s exclusive representative for the China market.

=== The MOF Cuvee: “Cuvée des Meilleurs Ouvriers de France, sommeliers ===
In the spring of 2013 Duval-Leroy launched its latest champagne, the “MOF” Cuvée. The initials M.O.F stand for “Meilleur Ouvrier de France”, a national distinction that honors “France’s Best Worker” in all manual activities. The MOF cuvee was conceived with input from France’s best sommeliers, as a tribute to that profession and to the world of fine dining. It is made exclusively from Grand Crus & Premiers Crus grapes of the 2008 vintage.

=== Partnerships and trophies ===
Every year Duval-Leroy takes part in over 750 events.

In 2009, it introduced the Duval-Leroy Trophy rewarding the Best Young Sommelier of France. Held every other year, and organized by the Union of French Sommeliers, the competition is open to sommeliers under 26 years of age. The latest edition, which in Vertus on November 25, 2013 crowned young Maxime Brunet of the Chapeau Rouge restaurant in Dijon. (ref – Le Chef, Décembre 2013) 82 candidates were present at the selection, organized at the beginning of April, and ten made it to the finals.

Since 2005, the Carol Duval-Leroy Trophy rewards the best young pastry chef, in a “Dessert of the Year” competition.

The House of Duval-Leroy has also been a steady partner of the competition for "France’s Best Worker" for the Sommeliers category, since the year 2000 ("Meilleur Ouvrier de France, Sommellerie").

Carol Duval Leroy also sponsors the Prix des Lilas, a literary prize, awarded every year to the best woman novel writer, during a ceremony held at The Closerie des Lilas restaurant in Paris.

== Vineyards ==
Duval-Leroy vineyards comprises 200 hectares (490 acres) under cultivation, which represents a third of the requirements of the house. 40% of its grapes are from Grands Crus and Premiers Crus vineyards. It is present in all villages classified Grand Crus in the Côte des Blancs, such as Oger, Mesnil sur Oger and Avize, and almost all villages classified Grands Crus in the Montagne de Reims, such as Ambonnay, Bouzy and Verzennay. Duval-Leroy benefits from a reliable supply of high quality grapes to elaborate fine wines.

The vineyard is managed to respect environmental commitments. The company has five press centers across Champagne.

== Commitment to sustainable development ==
Since the beginning, environmental concerns and sustainable development have been at the forefront of the Duval Leroy grape growing and wine making philosophy. Above and Beyond a reasoned vineyard management, Duval-Leroy has developed a precise program of wine growing taking into consideration environmental and statutory constraints. Measures to combat the run-off of rain water and limit pollution; measures to combat erosion, and measures to preserve natural diversity through the restoration of ecological niches have all been implemented in the past twenty years.

The use of weed killers in the vineyard has been cut by over fifty percent since the year 2000. Water consumption has been lowered by 30%. Likewise the use of phytosanitary products intended to protect the vineyard has been limited and work methods have been optimized to limit the use of such products in as much as it is possible.

Duval-Leroy has invested in renewable energies to power its new winery. The tasting room, reception areas, as well as the oak barrel room where the wine is set to rest are now lit and heated by solar panels. A green wall, comprising over 2500 plants, brings insulation from both heat and sound for this space, providing the cool and quiet necessary for quality wine making. Finally a waste management policy has been in place for over ten years insuring that, wine by products as well as office generated waste, such as ink, paper, cardboard, etc., are all recycled.

As a result of its conscious approach to environmental issues Duval-Leroy became the first house of champagne to obtain the ISO 9002 certification back in 1994. Today it has been awarded the IFS, BRC and ISO 22000 certifications as well. The next goal of the company is to achieve “HVE” standard, which stands for “High Environmental Value”, with a 2015 time target.

Duval-Leroy was also the first house of champagne to produce a cuvee from organically grown grapes. Called “Authentis”, and made from 100% pinot noir grapes, this cuvee is a “blanc de noirs” from the “premier cru” terroir of Cumières. Authentis has received the “ecocert” (for “eco certification”) label.

Duval-Leroy also produces a “Brut AB”, from organically grown grapes. “AB” stands for “agriculture biologique”, the French equivalent of “organic agriculture”.

Thanks to its investments and actions in favor of sustainable development, Carol Duval-Leroy was awarded the Green Business prize from La Tribune Women’s Award in December 2013.

== Range of wines ==
The house of Duval-leroy produces vintage and non-vintage champagnes, in a range of styles going from "nature" (meaning zero dosage) to "dry" (25gr of sugar added per liter).

Traditional cuvées

- Brut: blend of chardonnay and pinot noir, made from fifteen different crus, 35% of them estates owned. Made the Wine Spectator Top 100 classification for 2008.
- Fleur de Champagne Brut 1er cru - 70% chardonnay and 30% pinot noir; from Grand and Premier Cru vineyards from the Grande Vallée de la Marne, the Montagne de Reims and the Côte des Blancs. Duval-Leroy's most famous cuvée and signature champagne. First released in 1911.
- Demi-Sec - A sweeter style, made from 90% Pinots Noir and Meunier.
- Prestige Rosé: made by the "saignée" method, which consists in letting the juice in contact with the red grapes skins just long enough to give the desired colour and flavor.
- Brut AB - made from organically grown grapes and certified organic by Ecocert.
- Lady Rose - Blend of pinot noir and chardonnay, this cuvée is specially designed to accompany desserts and was conceived in collaboration with famed French pastry chef Pierre Hermé.
- Vintage - Produced in good years of 100% Chardonnay. The latest available vintage is 2004. A year with little rain and a very sunny summer, allowing for a full ripening of the grapes

Special cuvées

- Collection Paris - Sold in a bottle designed by American painter LeRoy Neiman.

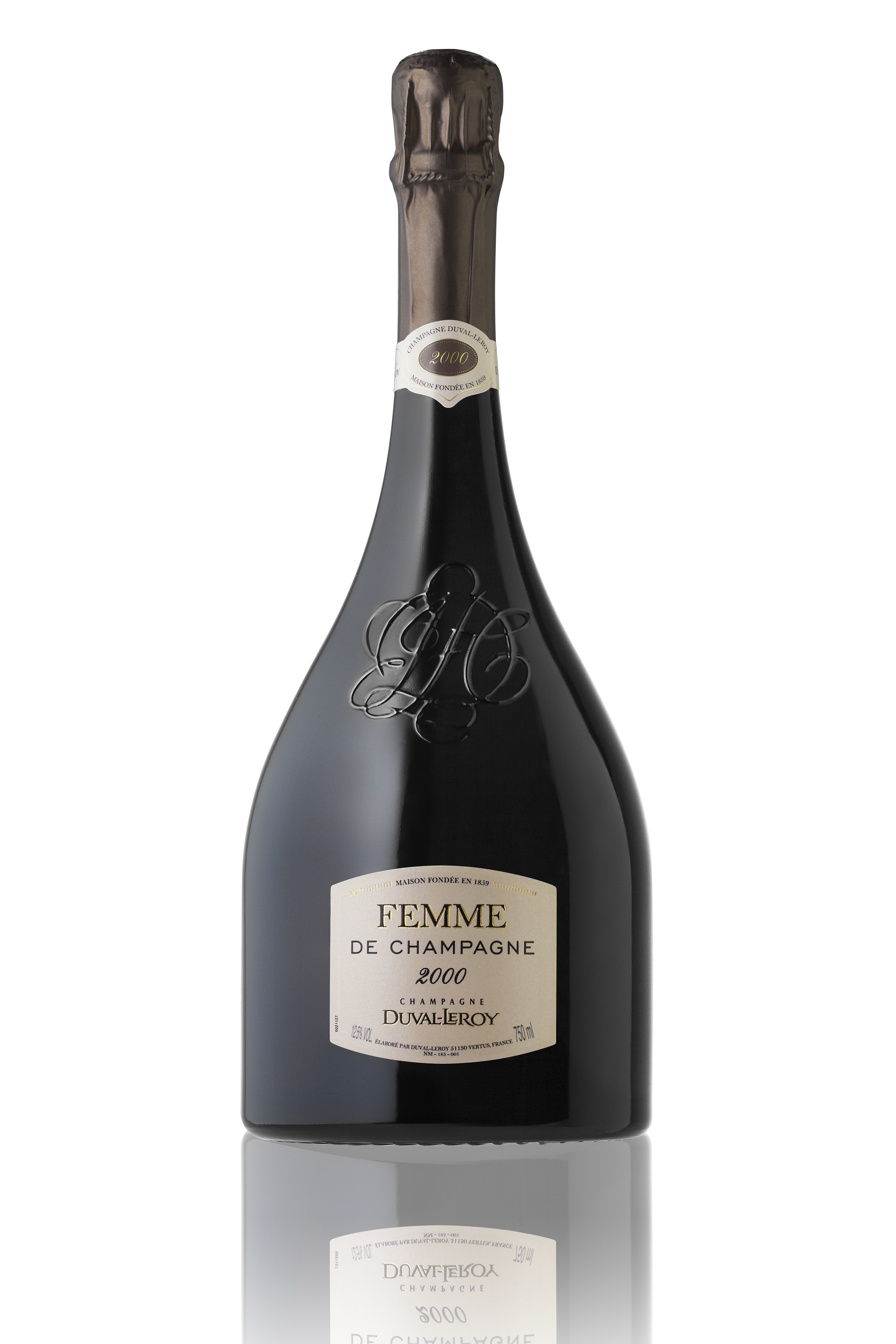
Cuvée Femme de Champagne 2000, Duval-Leroy

- Clos des Bouveries - Single vintage, from a single vineyard overlooking Vertus, made from a single grape, chardonnay, and 100% barrel fermented, this cuvee is both unique and experimental. The Clos des Bouveries is a 3.5 hectares (8.6 acres)plot that has been in the family hands since the very early days of Duval-Leroy. Its subsoil is of limestone, with fragments of flints. A one yard deep vertical cut is on display at the winery. The plot, set at mid hill, also face east and benefits from extended sun exposure. Duval-leroy uses it as a barometer of climatic evolution.
- Authentis Cumières (vintage) - 100% Pinot Noir. Barrel fermented. Certified organic by Ecocert. From a single Premier Cru vineyard from the Vallée de la Marne.

Prestige cuvée

- Femme de Champagne (vintage) - Only produced the best years. Made from Chardonnay Grand Crus of Mont-Aigu from Chouilly, Chapelle of Avize, Terre de Noël from Oger, and Chetillon and Aillerand from Le Mesnil-sur-Oger, with a touch of Pinot Noir. This cuvee ages for a minimum of 10 years before release. First produced in 1990. 1995, 1996 and 2000 vintages available.
- Femme de Champagne Rosé. (vintage). Made by "saignée" method from Grand Cru terroirs. Latest vintage available is 2006.

== See also ==
- List of champagne producers
