= Vertus =

- Part of Blancs-Coteaux
- Coat of arms
- Location of Vertus
- Location within France Location within Grand Est
- Coordinates: 48°54′19″N 4°00′08″E
- Country: France
- Region: Grand Est
- Department: Marne
- Arrondissement: Épernay
- Canton: Vertus-Plaine Champenoise
- Commune: Blancs-Coteaux
- Area^{1}: 35.68 km^{2} (13.78 sq mi)
- Elevation: 107 m (351 ft)
- Population (2022): 2,213
  - Density: 62.02/km^{2} (160.6/sq mi)
- Demonym: Vertusiens
- Time zone: UTC+01:00 (CET)
  - Summer (DST): UTC+02:00 (CEST)
- Postal code: 51130
- ^{1} French Land Register data, which excludes lakes, ponds, glaciers > 1 km^{2} (0.386 sq mi or 247 acres) and river estuaries.

Vertus (French pronunciation: [vɛʁty]) is a former commune in the Marne department in north-eastern France. On 1 January 2018, it was merged into the new commune of Blancs-Coteaux. The Encyclopédiste Antoine-Claude-Pierre Masson de La Motte-Conflans (1727–1801) was born and died in Vertus.

== World War II ==
After the liberation of the area by Allied Forces in September 1944, engineers of the Ninth Air Force IX Engineering Command began construction of a combat Advanced Landing Ground southwest of the town. Declared operational on 5 September, the airfield was designated as "A-63", it was used as a transport base until October when the unit moved into Central France. Afterward, the airfield was used for resupply and casualty evacuation before being closed in May 1945.

== Champagne ==
Vertus is located in the Côte de Blancs subregion of Champagne. It is one of the highest rated Premier Cru villages of Champagne. With 500 hectares of vines, Vertus is the second largest village in Champagne, and the largest in the Marne department. Vertus is the home of one of the major Champagne houses: Duval-Leroy is established in the village since 1859.

== See also ==
- Communes of the Marne department
- Leutard of Vertus
