= Philipponnat =

Champagne Philipponnat Réserve Perpétuelle 2022 and 2 glasses

Champagne Philipponnat is a historic Champagne house based in Mareuil-sur-Aÿ, France, with family roots in the region dating back to 1522. The house is currently led by 15th-generation family member Charles Philipponnat; his father René was the cellar master at Moët & Chandon from 1949 to 1977 and in charge of notable vintages such as 1961 Dom Pérignon.

The house style is full-bodied, long-aging champagnes based on pinot noir.

Clos des Goisses, the house prestige cuvée, was among the very first single vineyard wines in the Champagne region. It is sourced from a 5.5-hectare, 45-degree south-facing pure chalk slope.

== See also ==
- List of champagne houses
