= Urville, Aube =

Commune in Grand Est, France

Urville
- Commune
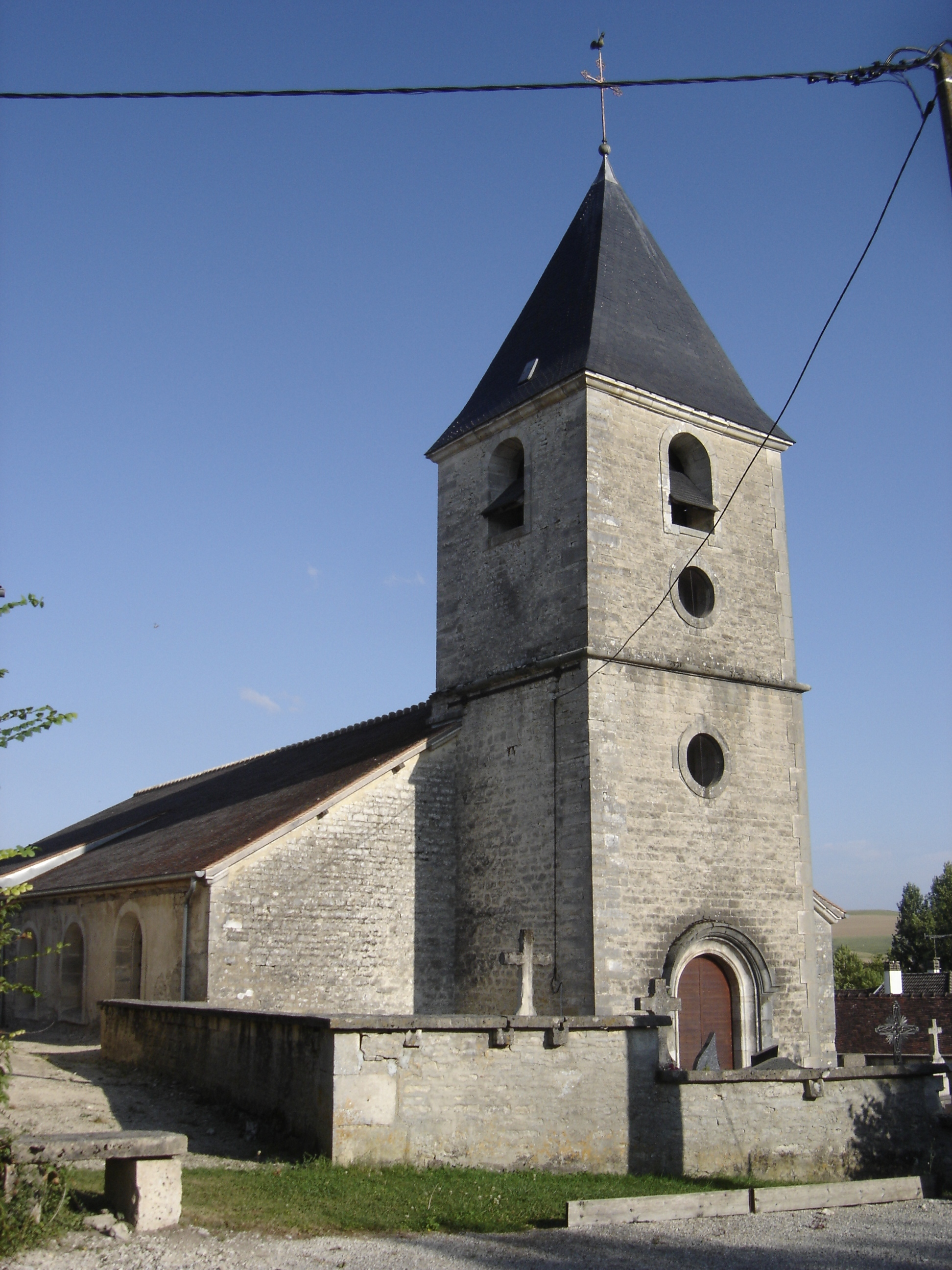
- The church in Urville
- Location of Urville
- Location within France Location within Grand Est
- Coordinates: 48°10′17″N 4°39′15″E
- Country: France
- Region: Grand Est
- Department: Aube
- Arrondissement: Bar-sur-Aube
- Canton: Bar-sur-Aube
- Intercommunality: Région de Bar-sur-Aube

Government
  - Mayor (2020–2026): Didier Jobert
- Area^{1}: 12.2 km^{2} (4.7 sq mi)
- Elevation: 336 m (1,102 ft)
- Highest elevation: 365 m (1,198 ft)
- Lowest elevation: 212 m (696 ft)
- Population (2023): 103
  - Density: 8.44/km^{2} (21.9/sq mi)
- Time zone: UTC+01:00 (CET)
  - Summer (DST): UTC+02:00 (CEST)
- INSEE/Postal code: 10390 /10200
- ^{1} French Land Register data, which excludes lakes, ponds, glaciers > 1 km^{2} (0.386 sq mi or 247 acres) and river estuaries.

Urville (French pronunciation: [yʁvil]) is a commune in the Aube department in north-central France. Urville has the highest average household income in France, at €142,888 per year (in 2020).

== Population ==
Historical population
Year	Pop.	±% p.a.
1968	172	—
1975	166	−0.51%
1982	188	+1.79%
1990	177	−0.75%
1999	148	−1.97%
2007	151	+0.25%
2012	147	−0.54%
2017	130	−2.43%
2023	103	−3.81%
Source: INSEE

== See also ==
- Communes of the Aube department
