= ECOCERT =

Organic certification organization

- Official logo
- Formation: 1991; 35 years ago
- Website: ecocert.com

ECOCERT is an organic certification organization, founded in France in 1991. It is based in Europe but conducts inspections in over 80 countries, making it one of the largest operations of its kind in the world.

ECOCERT's co-founder and CEO is William Vidal. It began as a partnership between European nations, but has gradually expanded to many other countries. The company's French headquarters are located in L'Isle-Jourdain, Gers, France, and its ECOCERT INTERNATIONAL division which was previously based in Northeim, Germany, is shifted now to L'Isle-Jourdain.

ECOCERT primarily certifies food and food products, but also certifies cosmetics, detergents, perfumes, and textiles. The company inspects about 70% of the organic food industry in France and about 30% worldwide. ECOCERT is also a leading certifier of fair trade food, cosmetics and textiles as per ECOCERT Fair Trade standards.

The Ecocert had its predecessor in the French A.C.A.B. (Association des Conseillers en Agriculture Biologique), a manufacturer association founded in France in 1978, which spun off an independent control organization in 1991. It has received government support in France since 1992, followed by Belgium in 1992, and Germany and Portugal in 1995. The organization thus began as a partnership in several European countries, but has gradually expanded its reach to other countries in the world. First, offices were set up in various countries around the world, followed by their own subsidiaries, around 2002 in Brazil, Japan and Canada. Ecocert has been represented in China since 2006. In 2013, Ecocert took over Institute for Marketecology (Institut für Marktökologie GmbH and IMOswiss AG), and in 2014 IMOgroup AG. In 2019, Ecocert acquired U.S.-based Nature's International Certification Services (NICS), headquartered in Viroqua, WI, making Ecocert one of the largest organic certification agencies in the United States. The German subsidiary, Ecocert Deutschland GmbH, has its registered office in Constance, and the Swiss subsidiary, Ecocert Swiss AG, has its registered office in Kreuzlingen. The company is controlled by the family holding company of the co-founder and long-time chairman of the board, William Vidal (* 1953).

In 2023, the Group has created a sustainable packaging offer. The company is qualified to offer some certifications like Recyclass certification, Global Recycled Standard, or Ocean Bound Plastic. In 2026, International business of Ecocert Group currently accounts for 61 per cent of annual turnover. The group operates in more than 150 countries, with 36 offices

The group is moving towards digitalisation. Ecocert is developing a range of digital tools designed to facilitate the monitoring of certifications, information management and access to data. With the Empowering Consumers for the Green Transition, Ecocert is strengthening its audit/verification services as Claims verification, supplier derisking, scoring and data validation or traceability projects.
