= Napa Declaration on Place =

Declaration about wine origin

The Declaration to Protect Wine Place and Origin, commonly known as the Napa Declaration on Place, is a "declaration of joint principles stating the importance of location to wine and the need to protect place names."

The Declaration group brings together a diverse group of wine regions from multiple continents that compete with each other in the marketplace, yet agree that protecting wine place names worldwide is key to future of the quality wine world and to avoid consumer confusion. In 2011, the Declaration group released a poll of 1000 U.S. wine consumers with the following findings:

- 79% consider the region where a wine comes from an important factor when buying a bottle of wine;
- 75% report they would be less likely to buy a wine if they learned that it claimed to be from a place like Champagne, Napa Valley or Oregon, but in actuality was not;
- 84% think that the region a wine comes from is extremely important in determining its quality;
- 96% say that consumers deserve to know that the location where wine grapes are grown is accurately stated on wine labels; and
- 98% support establishing worldwide standards for all winemakers that would require that they accurately state the location where wine grapes are grown on wine labels.

Support for winegrowing place name protection has also been voiced by some of the world's preeminent names in food and wine. The declaration released an open letter on October 19 2011 signed by chefs and sommeliers lending their support for truth in wine labeling. Signatories included Thomas Keller from Per Se and the French Laundry; Ferran Adrià from El Bulli; Daniel Boulud from Daniel; Gérard Margeon from Alain Ducasse; Wolfgang Puck from Wolfgang Puck Restaurants; Antoine Hernandez from Joël Robuchon; Michel Richard from Citronelle; José Andrés from Jaleo and minibar; Pontus Elofsson from Noma; Charlie Palmer from Charlie Palmer Restaurants and many others from around the globe.

The declaration was signed in July 2005 by five United States winegrowing regions and three European Union winegrowing regions.

The signatory regions from the US were:

- Napa Valley
- Washington
- Oregon
- Walla Walla Valley
- Willamette Valley

The signatory regions from the EU were:

- Champagne
- Oporto (the region where Port wine is produced)
- Jerez (the region where Sherry is produced)

All wine regions signing the declaration pledged to work together to educate consumers about the importance of place and to protect the integrity of these names worldwide. It is the first such agreement among EU and U.S. winemakers and is seen as a step toward breaking down the "Old World vs. New World" focus in wine, replacing it with one that highlights greater understanding of where wine comes from all over the world.

The list of signatories to the agreement expanded in March 2007 when Sonoma County, Paso Robles, Chianti Classico, Tokay, and the Australian states of Victoria and Western Australia signed the Declaration at a ceremony in Washington, D.C.

In 2010, Rioja and Long Island added their signature to this effort.

On March 26, 2014, Santa Barbara, Bordeaux, and Bourgogne/Chablis became the latest signatories to the movement.

In May 2024, Virginia and the Leelanau Peninsula Wine Trail and Old Mission Peninsula Wine Trail, both of Michigan, signed on to this effort.

In addition, an invitation has been extended for winemakers from other wine-producing regions to sign onto the agreement.

== Joint Declaration to Protect Wine Place and Origin ==
The text of the declaration is as follows:

Whereas, it is generally acknowledged that there are a handful of truly extraordinary places on earth from which great wine is consistently produced.
Whereas, the names of these places are printed on labels side-by-side with the names of the producers to identify the origin of the wine.
Whereas, wine, more than any other beverage, is valued based on its association to its place of origin–and with good reason.
Whereas, even before modern technology allowed us to tie specific definitions to the soils, terrain, and climates of noted wine regions, winemakers were drawn to these special places.
Whereas, the names of these places are familiar, and synonymous with quality.
Whereas, we respectfully submit that the place where wine is grown plays a very important role in a consumer’s selection process.
Whereas, we are furthermore united in our belief that the geographic place names of wine regions are the sole birthright of the grapes that are grown there, and when these names appear on wines that do not contain fruit from that region, they lose their integrity and their relevance, becoming merely words.
Therefore, be it resolved that we, as some of the world’s leading wine regions, join together in supporting efforts to maintain and protect the integrity of these place names, which are fundamental tools for consumer identification of great winegrowing regions and the wines they produce.
