= Selosse =

Selosse is a French surname. Notable people with the surname include:

- Anselme Selosse (fl. 1980), French winemaker
- Jacques Selosse (fl. 1994), French winemaker
