= Foujita Chapel =

Chapel located in Marne, France

Coordinates: 49°15′51″N 4°02′17″E

The chapel of Our Lady Queen of Peace, or Foujita Chapel, was constructed in 1965–1966 at Reims, France. The chapel was conceived and designed by the artist Tsuguharu Foujita, and is famous for the frescos he painted in the interiors. The chapel was consecrated in 1966, and in 1992 was listed as an historic monument of France.

== Location ==
The chapel is situated in Reims, France on 33, rue du Champs de Mars. It is located in the gardens of the family residence of the Mumm champagne house, the then home of René Lalou who was Foujita's godfather on his conversion to Roman Catholicism. The chapel and its grounds were donated to the City of Reims on 18 October 1966.

== History ==
Foujita was a Japanese born painter who came to Paris in 1913, and is a known member of the School of Paris. After experiencing mystical enlightenment at the Abbey of Saint-Remi Basilica in Reims in 1959 he converted to Catholicism and was baptised at the Notre-Dame de Reims cathedral, on 14 October 1959.

Foujita's godfather René Lalou, then the chairman of Mumm champagne, decided with Foujita to build a Romanesque chapel dedicated to the Virgin Mary. Foujita drew up the plans for the chapel and the interior and exterior decoration, including stained glass windows, reliefs, ironwork, sculptures, and the frescos.

In 1965, work began under the architect Maurice Clauzier and was finished in 1966. The stained glass windows were crafted by the glazer Charles Marq, the wrought iron work and sculptures by Maxime Chiquet and the Andre brothers.

Over a period of three months in early June and August 1966, Foujita, by then 80, painted the chapel walls with religious iconography in the form of large frescos in blues, greens, browns and yellows. Although the frescos are of Christian themes, one can also find depictions of Foujita and his wife Kimiko, in addition to his friend Lalou and Lalou's wife.

The chapel was consecrated on 1 October 1966 and dedicated to Our Lady, Queen of Peace. It was donated to the city of Reims on 18 October 1966.

In 1992, the Foujita Chapel was listed as an historic monument.

== Interment of Foujita ==
"I built this chapel to atone for 80 years of sin" -Léonard Tsuguharu Foujita

In 2003, Foujita's coffin was reinterred at the Foujita chapel under the flagstones in the position he originally intended when constructing the chapel. He had previously been buried near the location of his final home in the Cimetière de Villiers-Le-Bâcle, Essonne département, France.
