= Lahaye =

Lahaye is a French surname. Notable people with the surname include:

- Benoît Lahaye, French Grower Champagne producer
- Beverly LaHaye (1929–2024), American Christian conservative activist and author, wife of Tim LaHaye
- Corinne Lahaye (1947–2020), French actress
- Damien Lahaye (born 1984), Belgian footballer
- Jean-Luc Lahaye (born 1952), French singer, television presenter and writer
- Jef Lahaye (1932–1990), Dutch racing cyclist
- Lucie Lahaye (born 1997), French racing cyclist
- Matthieu Lahaye (born 1984), French racing driver
- Paul Lahaye (1902–1983), Canadian politician
- Tim LaHaye (1926–2016), American evangelical Christian minister and author
- Tristan Lahaye (born 1983), French footballer
- Vital Lahaye (born 1937), Belgian writer and teacher

== See also ==
- LaHaye Ice Center, ice arena in Lynchburg, Virginia, United States
- Mount Lahaye, a mountain of Antarctica
- Delahaye (surname)
- Lahaie (surname)
