= Oliver Bodington =

British lawyer and writer (1859–1942)

- Born: Oliver Eaton Bodington; 1859; Kenilworth, Warwickshire, England
- Died: 24 September 1942 (aged 82–83); Paris, Vichy France
- Education: University of London; University of Paris
- Occupations: Lawyer; writer
- Spouse: Mary Chapman Redner (died 1920)
- Children: 3, including: Nicolas Bodington
- Relatives: George Bodington (grandfather); Alice Bodington (step-mother)

Oliver Eaton Bodington (1859 – 24 September 1942) was a British lawyer and writer. Known for his Paris-based legal practice, Bodington specialised in international law.

== Early life and education ==
Bodington was born on 6 March 1859 in Kenilworth, Warwickshire to George Fowler Bodington, a physician who specialised in mental disorders, and Caroline Mary Bodington (née Eaton; died 1867). Baptised into the Church of England on 4 May 1859, Bodington was the paternal grandson of physician George Bodington. The eldest of seven siblings, Bodington was the brother of the Canadian radio announcer Maurice Bodington. Bodington had four younger step siblings from his father's second marriage to the writer Alice Bodington.

Educated at Giggleswick School, Bodington graduated from the University of London in 1878. Admitted into the Inner Temple in 1881, Bodington was called to the bar on 17 November 1874. By 1895, Bodington held a Licence de droit from the University of Paris.

== Professional practice ==
Oliver Eaton Bodington numbered among his clients well-known British and American expatriates living in Paris. For instance, in a celebrated law suit involving ownership of artistic works, Bodington represented the renowned artist James Abbott McNeill Whistler (see "Whistler's Mother"), whose portrait of Lady Eden (Sybil Frances Grey, later Lady Eden, the mother of Anthony Eden), having been rejected by the Edens; Bodington witnessed and verified its over painting by the artist.

Bodington also conducted a successful sideline of helping monied American young ladies (those "lovely trans-Atlantic invaders" as Edith Wharton called them) find suitable titled European husbands in the pre-World War I marriage market.

Pursuant to these services, Bodington sued the American diplomat and Ambassador John George Alexander Leishman regarding unpaid fees relating to the property of his son-in-law, Louis de Gontaut-Biron. The reported fee was $6000, of which $2000 was paid before the suit was brought. Mr. Leishman insisted that Bodington was his daughter Marthe, Comtess de Gontaut-Biron’s lawyer, not his own.

Among his more celebrated cases, Bodington represented "Mrs. Marie Van Rensimer Barnes" in 1912, in the aftermath of a violent altercation in a Paris apartment that led to shots being fired by herself and her presumed lover, Walther von Mumm (AKA Walter de Mumm), of the well-known wine merchant family. Dubbed the "champagne king" of Rheims, Baron von Mumm, a pioneer aviator and future Olympic Games bobsledder (1932, Lake Placid), was wounded seriously, but refused to press charges. Immediately following the shooting, Mrs. Barnes (an alias, her real name being Mary Cleveland Rensimer) fled to London's Carlton Hotel. She claimed to be the divorced wife of a Baltimore physician, who, when contacted, revealed that he had never been married to Miss Rensimer and that she had in fact stalked him mercilessly in the year 1900. Mary Jane Cleveland Van Rensimer, (born Riegelsville, PA 30 April 1888, died Reuil-Malmaison 12 August 1935), eventually became the second wife of Boris Aleksandrovich, Prince Golitsyn, (born 23 June 1880, Sima, Valdmiri, Russia; died 28 July 1947). They were married in Berlin on 23 Apr 1921 but divorced not long thereafter.

Bodington was a member of the United States Federal Bar and was President of the British Chamber of Commerce.

== Personal life ==
Bodington was a fixture at the bridge tables in Monte Carlo and an aficionado of French ecclesiastical architecture. These avocations he translated into books:

“Thirty Seasons at Monte Carlo” (1924), "Bridge (card game) Wisdom for Beginners and Others" (1933) and “The Romance Churches of France” (1925). He was the author of books and articles relating to his profession, including "The French Law of Marriage" (1895), as well as the book “'Quiseen' and Other Thoughts” (1924).

In 1892, Bodington married Mary Chapman Redner (1868–1920) a native of Philadelphia. The couple had three sons, including the journalist and intelligence officer Nicolas Bodington.

In November 1942, Bodington's death was reported by the International Red Cross as having occurred in Paris on 24 September 1942 from malnutrition.

== Bibliography ==
- Kelly, Edmond (1895). Bodington, Oliver Eaton (ed.). The French Law of Marriage, Marriage Contracts, and Divorce, and the Conflict of Laws Arising Therefrom (2 ed.). London: Stevens and Sons.
- Bodington, Oliver (1904). An Outline of the French Law of Evidence.
- Bodington, Oliver (1925). The Romance Churches Of France: A Manual Of French Ecclesiastical Architecture In The Twelfth Century For The Student And The Traveller. Boston, Massachusetts; New York City, New York: Houghton Mifflin Company.
