= Pascal Agrapart =

Producer of grower champagne

Agrapart & Fils
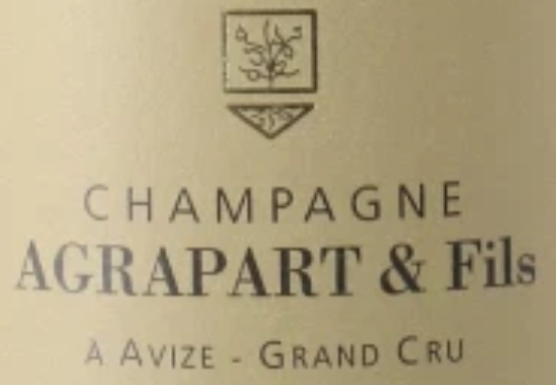
- Location: France
- Coordinates: 48.9736073°N 4.0064293°E
- Area cultivated: 12 hectares (30 acres)
- Cases/yr: 5400

Pascal Agrapart (formerly Agrapart & Fils) is a producer of grower champagne which makes organic wines with a focus on terroir. The house was founded in Avize by Arthur Agrapart in 1894. His grandson, Pierre, expanded the production in the 1950s–1960s. Since 1984, the family business has been run by Pascal Agrapart; and the fifth generation of the family, Ambroise Agrapart, joined his father Pascal in 2018.

== Viniculture ==
The vineyards are spread over 12 hectares in the Côte des Blancs among 62 parcels, most in the grand cru villages of Avize, Cramant, Oiry and Oger. The vines average about 35 years of age, with some over 60 years.

The house produces three vintage dated Champagnes: Minéral, L'Avizoise and Vénus. Agrapart practically never chaptalizes. The house produces less than 5,400 cases per year.

== Awards and honors ==
Agrapart & Fils has received the highest possible rating of three-stars in La Revue du vin de France's Le guide des meilleurs vins de France. A 3-star rating was awarded to only nine Champagne estates in total, including Selosse, Egly-Ouriet and Krug.
