= Anselme Selosse =

French winemaker

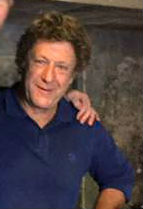
Anselme Selosse

Anselme Selosse is a Champagne producer and grower based in the Avize region of Champagne, France. He is the son of Jacques Selosse and is part of the fourth generation of his family to grow wine.

== Production ==
Anselme produces Jacques Selosse champagne, named after his father. He took over the family vineyard in 1980 after attending enology school in Burgundy and working alongside the legendary vignerons at Domaine Coche-Dury, Domaine Leflaive, and Domaine des Comtes Lafon. As of 2006, the Selosse fields numbered 37 acres, in 42 different parcels, almost all chardonnay with some pinot noir.

His particular type of wine is known as Grower Champagne, where grapes used to produce the wines are grown in vineyards owned by the Selosse family, rather than being purchased from other growers. He was one of the first winemakers to show that small producers can make their own wine. Anselme is considered a pioneer of biodynamics in Champagne and grows his grapes in an organic way. Selosse wines are fermented in oak barrels, in contrast to the majority of Champagne producers who often use stainless steel tanks. Consequently, the wines are often described as artisanal.

In 1994, the Gault-Millau guide named him France’s best winemaker in every category.

== Hotel ==
Anselme and his wife Corinne, own and operate Hôtel Les Avisés, a 10-room inn adjacent to the family winery. While his champagne house does not take many tasting appointments, staying at the hotel is one of the ways to meet this winemaker.
