= Alice Bodington =

British Canadian science writer (1840–1897)

- Born: Alice Brooke; 22 May 1840; Rome, Comarca of Roma, Papal States
- Died: 15 February 1897 (aged 56); Provincial Hospital for the Insane, New Westminster, British Columbia, Canada
- Other name: Alice Bell
- Spouses: Edward William Derrington Bell (m. 1857; div. 1869); George Fowler Bodington (m. 1873)
- Children: 7
- Father: Francis Brooke
- Relatives: George Bodington (father-in-law); Oliver Bodington (step-son)

Alice Bodington (née Brooke, formerly Bell; 22 May 1840 – 15 February 1897) was a British Canadian writer of scientific literature and populariser of science.

== Early life and family ==
Bodington was born Alice Brooke on 22 May 1840 in Rome, Comarca of Roma (Note: Also cited as Athens.) (present-day Italy) to Francis Brooke, a British Army officer, landowner and cricketer, and Juliana Jemima Brooke (née Alix; 1818–1840). On 1 June 1840, Brooke was baptised at the British Chaplaincy in Rome. Raised at Ufford Place, the Brooke families' country home in Suffolk, her father remarried in 1852 to Louisa Brooke (née Duff). Brooke had 5 younger half-siblings from her father's second marriage.

On 28 May 1857, the 17 year old Brooke married Edward William Derrington Bell, a lieutenant colonel and later Major general who was 16 years her senior. (Note: Brooke's age was listed as 21 on the couple's marriage certificate.) The couple had at least 3 children, of which only one survived to adulthood. During the marriage, Bell lived as an army wife in Malta, Gibraltar and Montreal. The marriage was unhappy, and Bell suffered from depression. In 1865, Bodington had an affair with Major Tyssen Sowley Holroyd (1838–1914) and her husband petitioned for a divorce in 1867; the couple's divorce was granted the following year. Brooke married her second husband George Fowler Bodington, a physician who specialised in mental disorders, on 5 May 1873. The couple had 4 children, and Bodington was the stepmother of the 6 living children from George's first marriage, including the lawyer and writer Oliver Bodington.

== Career ==
The family lived at Ashwood House, a private asylum run by George Fowler Bodington, in Kingswinford. In 1887, Bodington, her husband and their children immigrated to Canada where she began writing. Initially settling in Vancouver, the family moved a year later to Hatzic where they took up farming. Bodington wrote about a wide variety of subjects including religion, race, marriage and evolution. Her articles where printed in publications such as The American Naturalist, Popular Science Monthly, The Journal of Microscopy and Natural Science, and The Westminster Review. Her work remains an important window into the popular scientific culture of the 19th century and the climate of British imperialism.

Her book Studies in Evolution and Biology, received a positive review in The American Naturalist. Bodington was an advocate of neo-Lamarckism. She was an avid supporter of the dissemination of scientific literature, believing that scientific knowledge needed to be accessible to the people if it were to be of any real use to society. Bodington believed that many scientists lacked the ability to express their findings in a way clear and understandable to non-professionals. She viewed herself as a promoter of science and played a role similar to that of a modern pundit. In her writings for The Westminster Review, she discussed the development of the brain and argued the inferiority of Africans. Her single book was criticized for her comments questioning why writers on Science were meant to perform experiments.

In 1895, Bodington's husband was appointed the medical superintendent to the Provincial Hospital for the Insane in New Westminster, British Columbia. Feeling isolated in her new home, Bodington suffered from depressed.

== Personal life ==
Through her second marriage, Bodington was the daughter-in-law of the physician George Bodington.

On 15 February 1897, Bodington died in New Westminster at the Provincial Hospital for the Insane, aged 56.

== Works ==
- "Curiosities of Evolution", in Popular Science Monthly Volume 33, October 1888
- "Studies in Evolution and Biology" (1890)
- "The Importance of Race and Its Bearing on the "Negro Question" (October, 1890), Westminster Review
- “The Hidden Self”, The Open Court, a Quarterly Magazine Dec 4, 1890
- “A Modern View of Ghosts”, The Open Court, a Quarterly Magazine Jan 14, 1892
- “Mental Evolution in Man and the Lower Animals” The American Naturalist, Vol. 26, No. 306 (Jun., 1892), pp. 482–494
- “Mental Evolution in Man and the Lower Animals (Continued)” The American Naturalist, Vol. 26, No. 307 (Jul., 1892), pp. 593–606
- “The Survival of the Unfit”, The Open Court, a Quarterly Magazine Aug 4, 1892
- “Legends of the Sumiro-Accadians of Chaldea” The American Naturalist, Vol. 27, No. 313 (Jan., 1893), pp. 14–19
- “Legends of the Sumiro-Accadians of Chaldea (Continued)” The American Naturalist, Vol. 27, No. 314 (Feb., 1893), pp. 105–112
- “The Parasitic Protozoa Found in Cancerous Diseases” The American Naturalist, Vol. 28, No. 328 (Apr., 1894), pp. 307–315
- “Insanity in Royal Families. A Study in Heredity” The American Naturalist, Vol. 29, No. 338 (Feb., 1895), pp. 118–129
