= Grower champagne =

Owner-produced Champagnes

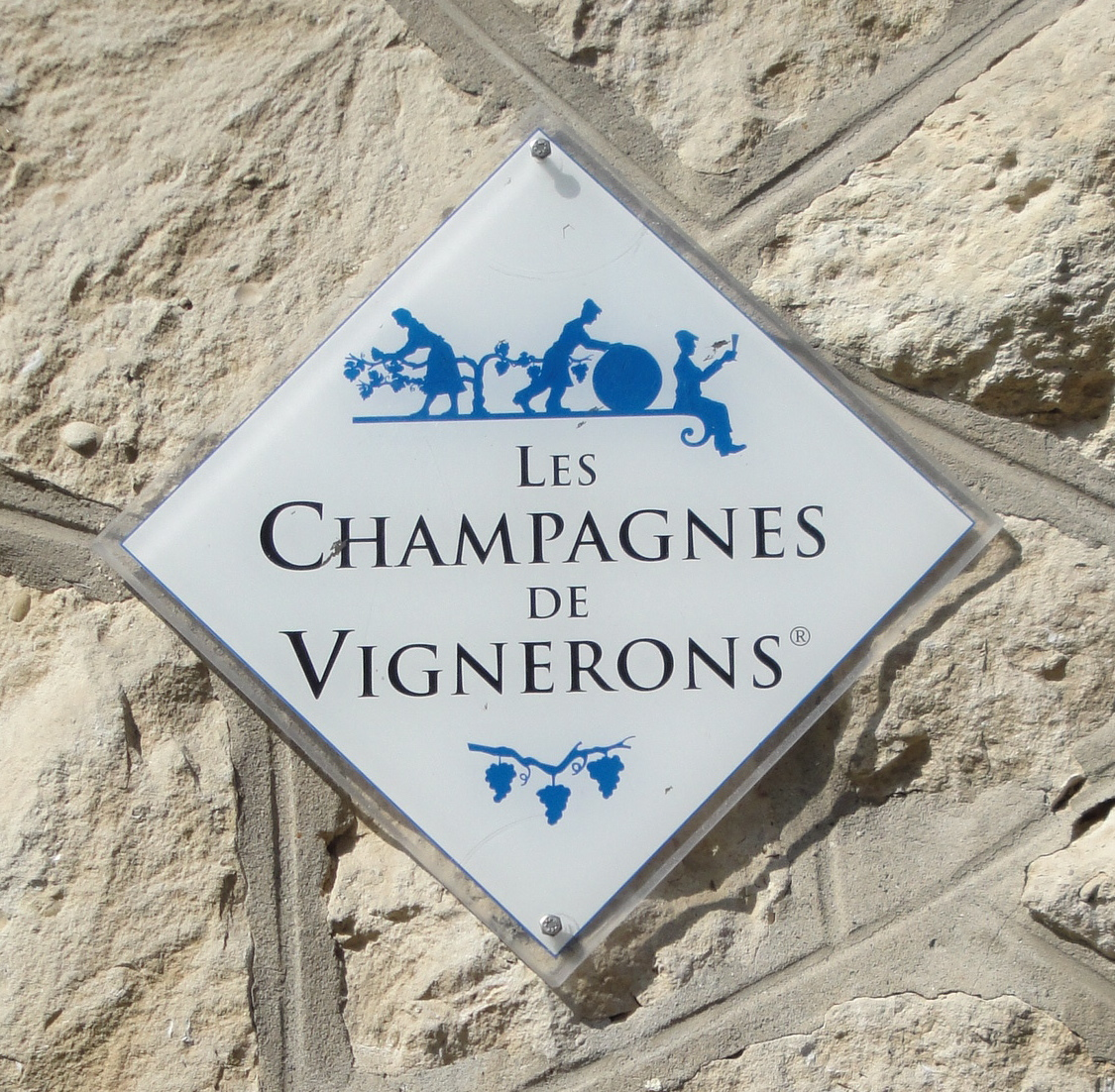
The Les Champagnes de Vignerons ("Vinegrower Champagnes") sign is displayed by many producers of grower champagne at their facilities, in this case Chartogne-Taillet in Merfy

A grower champagne or artisan champagne is a champagne produced by the estate that owns the vineyards where the grapes are grown. Récoltant-manipulant is the term in French, and grower champagnes can be identified by "RM" on the wine label. While large champagne houses such as Mumm, Moët et Chandon and Veuve Clicquot may use grapes from as many as 80 different vineyards in the Champagne region to create a consistent house style, grower champagnes tend to be more terroir-focused, sourced from a single vineyard or closely located vineyards around a village, and made with grapes which vary with each vintage. Today there are over 19,000 independent growers in the Champagne region, accounting for nearly 88% of vineyard land in the region; around 5,000 of these growers produce wine from their own grapes. Of the champagne imported into the US in 2014, only 5% was grower champagne.

== Wine styles ==
Grower champagnes have been described as "artisanal winemaking" with terroir being at the forefront for each wine, rather than an emphasis on a consistent "house style" that can be made year after year. While large champagne houses, such as Moët et Chandon may source grapes from the entire Champagne region, the vineyards owned by a grower champagne maker are generally clustered around a single village. Some growers will craft their wine to reflect the terroir of that village, or even specific plots within the village, especially if they own vineyards in one of Champagne's grands crus. Grower champagnes are often released younger than their large house counterparts due, in part, to the greater financial resources that would be needed for long term aging and storage. Many also show a lower dosage than most negociant manipulant bottlings, or occasionally no dosage at all.

== RM champagne producers ==
Producers of RM champagne include Nomine-Renard, Harlin Père & Fils, Franck Bonville, Roger Coulon, Collard-Picard, Egly-Ouriet, Tarlant, Nowack, Chartogne-Taillet, David Léclapart, Benoît Lahaye, Roses de Jeanne, Marie-Courtin, Vilmart & Cie, Pierre Péters, Jacques Selosse, Pascal Agrapart, Marc Hébrart and Lequeux-Mercier.

== Recent vintages ==
The 2013 vintage is considered a modern classic with balance and good yields. The 2012 vintage is deemed excellent and might surpass 2008 in quality. The 2011 vintage saw difficult conditions which created uneven wines. The 2009 vintage was warm enough to ripen the fruit, resulting full, fruity Champagnes. 2008 was an outstanding vintage, showing both high ripeness and high acidity.

== Sales market ==
The popularity of grower champagne is a relatively recent phenomenon. Since the 18th century, champagne houses have dominated the business dynamic in the region. These private houses or negociants would buy grapes from the owners of several vineyards to blend and make champagne. As of 2003, there were over 3,700 brands of grower champagnes available for purchase within France but only around 130 brands in the United States. As of 2008, these wines accounted for less than 3% of the champagne market, with that market growing as the wines continue to increase in popularity. Distributors and wine retailers tend to tout the comparative value and lower cost of grower champagnes versus the wines of larger champagne houses, due to the larger champagne houses' costs of mass market advertising. The smaller growers leave it up to the importer and wine retailer to market their wines.

== Criticism ==
A common criticism of grower champagnes is the potential for variable quality, especially from vintage to vintage. While the larger champagne houses and negociants have the flexibility to buy grapes from all over the Champagne region, grower champagne makers are limited to only their vineyard holdings. Conversely, advocates of grower champagnes say that the blending of many terroirs by the larger houses makes those wines "underflavored" and non-distinctive.

== Vineyard lands ==
There are over 19,000 independent growers in the Champagne region, accounting for nearly 88% of all vineyard land in the region. Around 5000 of these growers produce wine from their own grapes. The larger Champagne houses have holdings in only 12% of the region's vineyards, making it a necessity for them to buy grapes from independent growers. Under current Appellation d'origine contrôlée (AOC) regulations, there are strict limitations on planting. Some growers are seeing an economic advantage in making wine from their own grapes, especially if they have land in one of Champagne's Grand cru villages, rather than selling them to the larger houses where they become part of a generic blend.

== Identifying champagnes ==
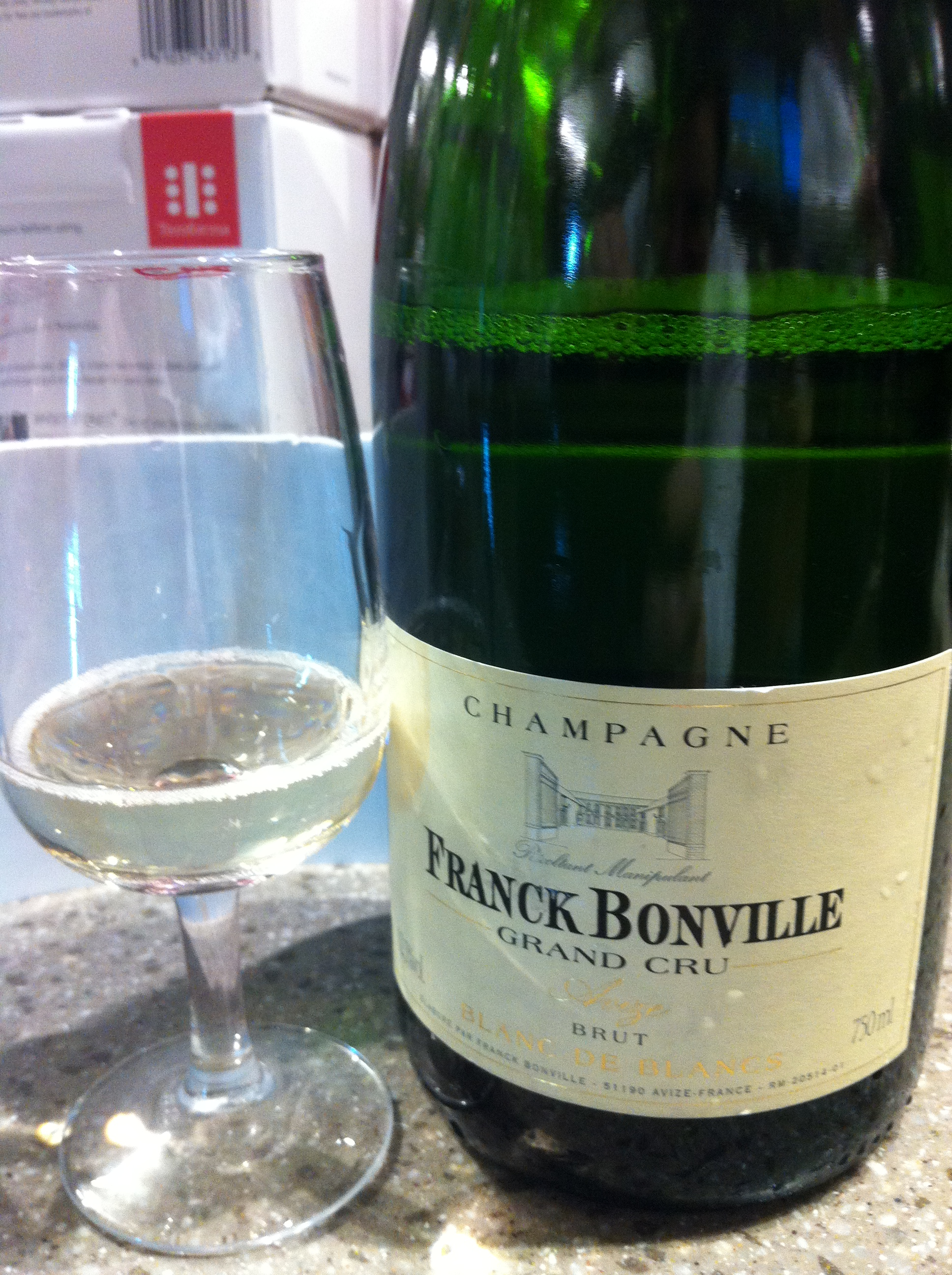
A Grand Cru grower champagne with the "RM" visible on the lower right corner.

Champagnes can be identified by the initials that appear before a number on the wine label. The initials most commonly associated with grower champagnes is RM (meaning Récoltant-Manipulant) but there are other initials that may appear on the label.

Other initials:

- The initials NM (meaning Négociant-Manipulant) appear on the labels of large Champagne houses that source the majority of their grapes rather than growing them.
- CM (meaning Coopérative-Manipulant) is a co-operative of growers who blend the product of their collective vineyards to sell under one or more brands. In this situation the individual grower may have some involvement in the winemaking process.
- RC (meaning Récoltant-Coopérateur) is a wine sourced from a single grower but made entirely for him by a co-operative winemaking facility. While the wine is sold under the grower's own brand, he will often have had very little if any involvement in the winemaking process.
- SR (meaning Société de Récoltants) is a registered firm set up by two or more growers who share the same winery which they use to make wine to sell under their own label. This designation differs from a CM in that the growers almost always have significant involvement in the winemaking process.
