= Lahaie (surname) =

Lahaie is a French surname. Notable people with the surname include:

- Brigitte Lahaie (born 1955), French radio talk show host and actress
- Félix Lahaie (1767–1829), French gardener
- Ivan LaHaie, American electrical engineer
- Marcelin L. Lahaie (1913–1973), Canadian officer

== See also ==
- Kim Lahaie Richards, American drag racer and crew chief
- Lahaye
