= Nicolas Bodington =

British journalist & soldier (1904-1974)

Nicolas Bodington OBE
- Born: Nicolas Redner Bodington; 6 June 1904; Paris, France
- Died: 3 July 1974 (aged 70); Plymouth, Devon, England
- Spouse: Audrey Bodington
- Father: Oliver Bodington
- Relatives: George Bodington (great-grandfather)
- Military career
- Allegiance: United Kingdom
- Branch: British Army; Special Operations Executive; MI6
- Service years: 1940–1945
- Rank: Major
- Nickname: Nick
- Conflicts: World War II

Nicolas Redner Bodington OBE (6 June 1904 – 3 July 1974) was a British journalist and during the Second World War second in command of the F (French) section of the Special Operations Executive (SOE). The purpose of SOE was to conduct espionage, sabotage and reconnaissance in occupied Europe and Asia against the Axis powers, especially Nazi Germany. In France, SOE agents allied themselves with French Resistance groups and supplied them with weapons and equipment parachuted in from England. Bodington led three missions to occupied France.

Bodington was associated with one of the most controversial and much-studied events in the history of SOE: the destruction of the Prosper network of SOE agents in France, the execution of many agents, and the disinformation campaign by the German Sicherheitsdienst (SD). Bodington defended the double agent, Henri Déricourt, who played an important role in Prosper's downfall.

== Early life ==
Bodington was born on 6 June 1904 in Paris to Oliver Bodington, a British lawyer and writer, and Mary Chapman Redner (1868–1920), who was from Philadelphia. His elder brother was Lieutenant colonel John Redner Bodington DSO MC, a soldier who served in World War I and World War II. Nicolas Bodington studied at Cheltenham College and (for a year) at Lincoln College, Oxford. He married Audrey Hoffmann in Cheltenham in September 1926. In 1929, he returned to Paris was a correspondent for the Daily Express and the Daily Sketch. In 1935, he became the Reuters's correspondent in Paris. Bodington spoke fluent Spanish as well as French and visited Spain to report on the Spanish Civil War. In 1938 his novel Solo was published in England by Victor Gollancz Ltd.

Double agent Henri Déricourt told author Jean Overton Fuller that he knew Boddington in Paris before World War II as both were fans of dirt track racing. In 1938, both knew Karl Bömelburg, attached to the German Embassy in Paris. In 1940, with the German conquest of France, Bőmelburg returned as the head of the Gestapo in Paris. The relationship of the three becomes important in subsequent events.

== MI6 ==
With the beginning of World War II in 1939, Bodington served for a time as a war correspondent in Paris. He applied to join MI6, then better known as the Secret Intelligence Service (SIS). He was turned down, possibly because of his "reputation for drinking, gambling, and not paying his debts." In April 1940, the French cancelled his accreditation as a war correspondent because of his "bad spirit." He applied to MI6 again and this time was redirected to a new organization, the Special Operations Executive, created in July 1940.

Claude Dansey of MI6 saw the new organization as a rival. The SOE's objective to "set Europe ablaze" (in Winston Churchill's words) threatened MI6's focus on intelligence. Wars, MI6 believed, were won by intelligence not sabotage. Dansey attempted to get his acolytes in positions of importance in SOE and exercise some control over SOE operations in what was, by then, German-occupied Europe. Bodington may have been placed in SOE by Dancey.

== SOE ==
Bodington joined the F (French) Section in December 1940. On 25 December he became the deputy head of F Section with the military rank of major. In January 1941 he recruited American Virginia Hall who became SOE's first female agent to live and work in France for an extended period of time. In August 1941, Maurice Buckmaster became Section F's head with Bodington as his deputy. Bodington's various cover identities and code names were "Nick", "Andre Edouard", "Jean Paul", "Pierrot" and "Pedlar".

In February 1942, Bodington participated in the failed attempt to evacuate by boat from France SOE agent Pierre de Vomécourt, codename Lucas, head of the 'Autogiro' network, and Mathilde Carré, codename Victoire, the double agent nicknamed La Chatte. In this and additional missions, SOE violated clandestine doctrine. As the Deputy of F Section, Bodington knew too much about the organization and its personnel and should not have been allowed to go to occupied France and risk capture by the Germans.

=== 1942 mission ===
The Carte network of André Girard on the French Riviera, in the words of M. R. D. Foot, seemed to be what F Section was seeking: "a ready made secret army which only needed arms and orders before it was ready to co-operate in throwing the Germans out of France." On the night of 29/30 July 1942, Bodington arrived in France on July 30 by felucca to evaluate collaborating with Carte. Girard persuaded Bodington and SOE agent Peter Churchill that he could initiate sabotage, proceed to guerilla war, and eventually field an army of 300,000 men that could unite with a revitalized French army to push the Germans out of France. Bodington was impressed and put SOE agents to work on the complexities of supporting Carte, such as a plan to provide food to a large number of men in a Carte army in food-short France. On his return to England in September, Bodington wrote "a long, strong, and enthusiastic report on Carte."

Major General Colin Gubbins head of SOE wrote of Bodington's mission, "As a result of his ingenuity, resourcefulness and perseverance, it has been possible to establish close relations with a very important group of French patriots. This contact would not have been successfully made without the personal visit of this officer". For his services, Bodington was decorated with the MBE and became a temporary major in July 1943.

Bodington's enthusiasm to the contrary, Carte began to fall apart from internal dissention by the end of 1942. Girard's "army" consisted of a list of 200 names, which was captured by the Germans. SOE gave weapons to Carte, but they rotted in a warehouse. Visiting the Riviera in March 1943, SOE agent Francis Cammaerts described Carte as "a shambles, lacking any sense of security or organizational rigor."

=== 1943 mission to France ===
The Prosper or Physician network (or reseau), based in Paris, was SOE's most important network in France. It was headed by Francis Suttill with Gilbert Norman as the wireless operator and second in command and Andrée Borrel as the courier. Jack Agazarian was a second wireless operator. Under its umbrella, Prosper had more than 30 SOE agents and hundreds of French collaborators in a number of sub-networks scattered over northern France.

In 1943, pilot Henri Déricourt was the air operations officer for Prosper with responsibility for the arrival and departure of clandestine flights of Westland Lysander and Lockheed Hudson aircraft that conveyed SOE agents to and from France. The airplanes landed in small farm fields at night and were met by Déricourt, his associates, groups of French supporters, and sometimes other SOE agents. Déricourt also acted as a postman, collecting uncoded mail and messages from SOE agents for transmittal to SOE headquarters in London with the Lysander pilots. He was successful at the job and came into contact with many agents. Déricourt, code named "Gilbert," as noted above, was a pre-war friend of Bodington. Déricourt was also agent BOE-48 of Karl Bomelcourt, Déricourt and Bodington's pre-war German friend, who was now the head of the Gestapo in Paris. Several SOE agents expressed doubts about Déricourt's loyalty, but SOE headquarters ignored them. Déricourt was running what seemed an effective operation.

In June and July 1943, Suttill, Norman, and Borrel and many other SOE agents were captured by the Germans. SOE was aware that Suttill and Borrel had been captured, but believed that Norman was still free. Ostensibly Norman was still in contact with SOE headquarters with wireless messages, although those messages were actually being sent by his German captors impersonating him.

To ascertain the situation with Prosper, Bodington and Jack Agazarian (then on leave in England), were flown to France on the night of 22–23 July by Lockheed Hudson, landing near Angers. Déricourt greeted them on the ground, escorted them to Paris, and placed them in apartments for their stay. Believing that Gilbert Norman was still free and through wireless contact, they arranged to meet him at an apartment. Fearing treachery, Agazarian went alone to the apartment and, instead of Norman, was greeted and arrested by Germans. Bodington said they flipped coins to see who would go to meet Norman and Agazarian lost. An eye witness said Bodington ordered Agazarian to go to the meeting. Whatever the reality, it was a breach of security for Agazarian to go or be sent to a meeting without reconnaissance in advance of what was a suspicious location. The usual procedure was to pay a uninvolved person, a random passerby or child, to visit the site and report what they saw.

Bodington remained in Paris for two more weeks, making contact with the few remaining SOE agents, including Noor Inayat Khan, the only wireless operator in Paris who had survived (temporarily) the Gestapo roundup of SOE agents. He was escorted by Déricourt to a clandestine airfield and returned to London via Lysander on the night of August 16/17.

Bodington's visit to Paris in July and August 1943 has incited speculation by historians about why he was not captured by the Germans. Capturing the Deputy Director of SOE's French Section him would have been a major triumph for the Germans. Déricourt knew Bodington's location and could have informed the Germans. The fact that the two had been pre-war friends may have caused Déricourt to protect Bodington. A second reason Bodington may not have been captured was that doing so would have unmasked Déricourt, and the Germans believed he was more valuable to them than Bodington. An intriguing factor is that Bodington knew that Déricourt was in contact with the Germans. Just prior to his departure for France on 23 June 1943 he left a note at SOE headquarters saying, "we know he [Déricourt] is in contact with the Germans and also how and why." The suspicion in post-war France was that Bodington was a German agent. An MI5 investigation in 1945 about Bodington's loyalty was "inconclusive."

Bodington may have been an agent for MI6 (SIS) infiltrated into SOE by Claude Dansey who had no love for SOE. SOE's Vera Atkins in 1994 said that Bodington "probably worked for SIS." The Dansey connection contributed to conspiracy theories that Prosper and SOE were deliberately sacrificed by SIS as part of a disinformation campaign to persuade the Germans that an allied invasion of France would occur in 1943. The theory goes that the deception had the objective of persuading the Germans to keep military units in France in 1943 rather than transferring them to the Soviet Union, where the German army was outnumbered and retreating.

After his return from France, Bodington spent six months lecturing and writing reports on the intricacies of the French political situation to troops preparing for the Allied invasion of France. Déricourt later told author Fuller that Bodington had been informally fired from his job.

In 1948, Henri Déricourt was being tried in France for treason, with a sentence of death a probability. Bodington showed up at the trial and was the lone witness to testify in Déricourt's defense. He said that SOE had known and approved of Déricourt's contacts with the Germans. Déricourt was acquitted and freed. It is a mystery why no former SOE officials (SOE had been abolished in 1946.) attended the trial to testify against Déricourt.

=== 1944 mission ===
On 11 February 1944 in London, Bodington interrogated Dericourt who had returned from France, to ascertain his loyalties.

In the spring of 1944 Bodington was due to return to France on an SOE mission to the southwest of France as the organiser of a resistance network but the mission was cancelled at the last moment, possibly due to concerns over an informant in France, later identified as a Frenchman named Bousquet, following the arrest of Charles Skepper, Eliane Plewman and Arthur Steele.

SFHQ sent him back to France under the codename Jean. Knowing that the Gestapo had a photograph of him and a price on his head Bodington parachuted on the night of 10 July 1944 into the dangerous Chalons-sur-Marne district to reactivate the Professor network in its new identity as the Pedlar network, and to assist the French Resistance. Accompanied by a small Special Air Service team of four men he provided useful information for RAF bombing objectives and, from 24 August, was attached to "Arnold" team of Operation Jedburgh. Jedburgh involved teams drawn from SAS, SOE, OSS and French intelligence operated behind German lines as liaison between French resistance groups and Allied command, supplying the resistance with equipment and directing them in acts of sabotage coordinated with the military situation. In total, 93 Jedburgh teams operated in 54 French metropolitan départements between June and December 1944. They were known by codenames which usually were first names (such as "Hugh"), with some names of medicines (such as "Novocaine") and a few random names thrown in to confuse German intelligence.

Bodington was recommended for a gallantry award, the Military Cross for his service in France, the recommendation recorded his previous missions to France and his return despite knowing that the Gestapo had his photograph and adds that – In the short time at his disposal Bodington arranged several receptions of arms and stores (parachuted by the Royal Air Force) to the French resistance in the Marne Department and organised guerrilla warfare against enemy garrisons and convoys passing through the area. In the St. Dizier, and Chaumont regions he took part in several clashes with the enemy and showed great courage in dealing with German formations by the use of the BAZOOKA and the PIAT. After his positions had been over-run by the American advance he passed through enemy lines several times to obtain valuable intelligence. He was recommended for a Military Cross for gallantry in action in Normandy but eventually received an OBE instead.

=== 1945 ===
Claims that Bodington had wartime contact with German intelligence agencies were investigated at the end of World War II. The National Archives in London has a file documenting the investigation carried out into these claims from February to July 1945 which states:

Nicholas Redner Bodington: British. Bodington was regarded as a distinguished member of SOE during the Second World War. However this file is mainly concerned with the suggestion that he may have been in touch with German Intelligence and have betrayed SOE agents to them. The allegations were not substantiated.

With rank of captain Bodington resigned his commission on 7 July 1945 and was granted permission to retain the rank of major.

=== After the war ===
In 1961 his second book, The Awakening Sahara. was published by Andre Deutsch,

== In popular culture ==
In the 6-episode TV docudrama "Lost Women Spies" (2024), which is about the life of the high-ranking SOE-spymaster Vera Atkins, Nicolas Bodington is portrayed by the actor Sean Pogmore. Around 15 minutes into episode one, Bodington's position in the SOE is discussed in detail, after which we see him return regularly in the rest of the story.

== Awards ==
- UK
  - Member of the Order of the British Empire Military Division (MBE). Awarded as captain, Temporary Major, British Army
  - Officer of the Order of the British Empire Military Division (OBE), Awarded as a major, British Army.
- France : Médaille de la Résistance

== Sources ==
- Patrick Howarth (1980). Undercover: The men and women of the SOE. Routledge. ISBN 0710005733.
- Foot, M. R. D. (1966). SOE in France. An account of the Work of the British Special Operations Executive in France, 1940–1944. London: HMSO. republished Whitehall History Publishing, in association with Frank Cass, 2004.
- André Gillois, L'Histoire secrète des Français à Londres, Le Cercle du nouveau Livre, Librairie Jules Taillandier, 1973.
- Verity, Hugh (2013). We Landed by Moonlight. Crecy Publishing. ISBN 9780947554750.
- Foot, M. R. D. (2006) [1966]. SOE in France (Revised ed.). Routledge. ISBN 0415408008.
- Nicolas Bodington (1938). Solo. Gollancz.
- Nicolas Bodington (1961). The Awakening Sahara. Andre Deutsch. ASIN B0000CL147.
- Paul Gaujac (1999). Special Forces in the Invasion of France. Histoire & Collections. ISBN 2-908-182-947.
