= George Bodington =

British general practitioner (1799–1882)

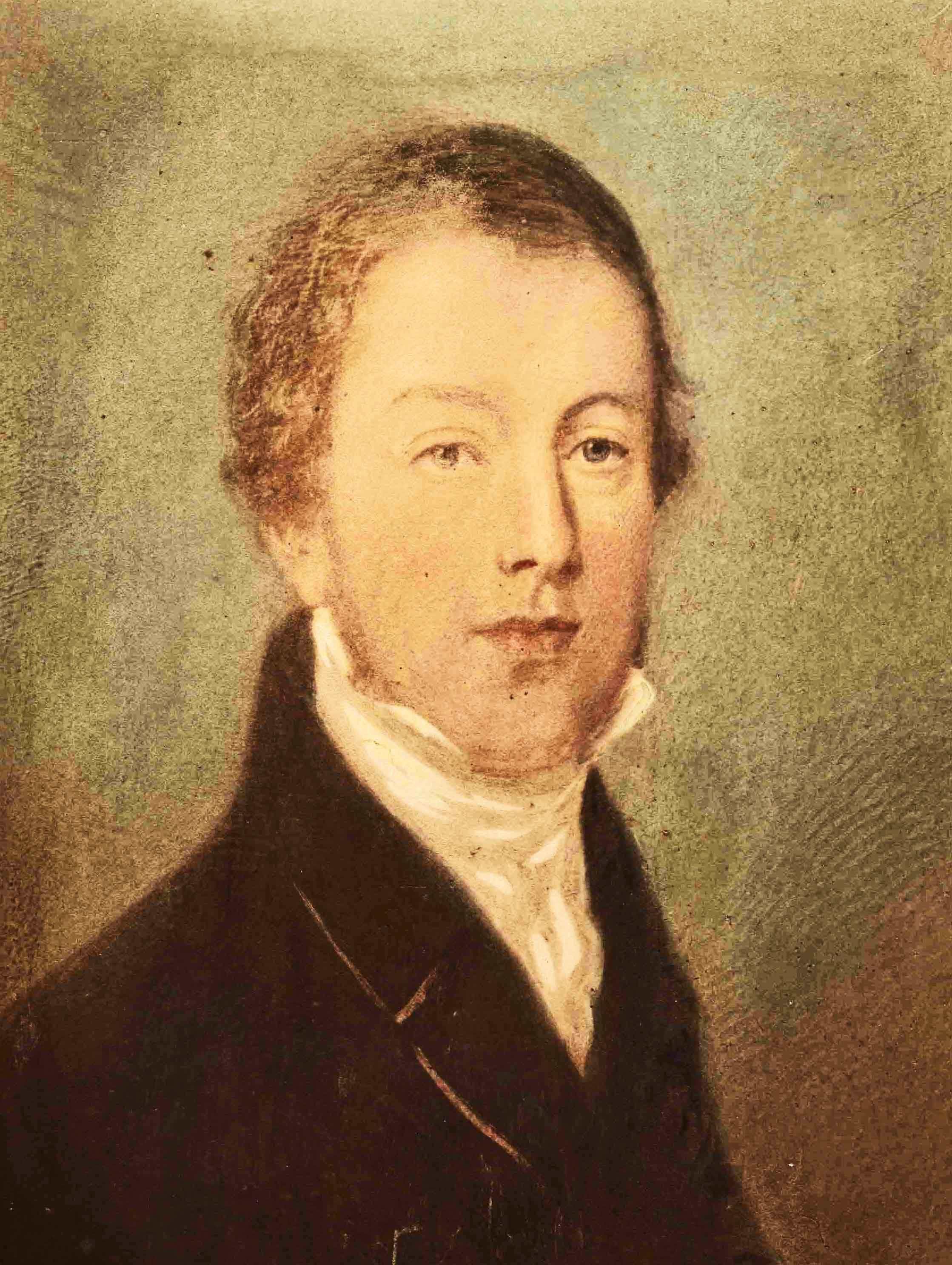
- Bodington in 1830
- Born: 1799; Calverton, Buckinghamshire, Kingdom of Great Britain
- Died: 5 February 1882 (aged 82–83); Rocksall House, Sutton Coldfield, Warwickshire, UKGBI
- Education: St Bartholomew's Hospital; Society of Apothecaries, LSA, 1825; University of Erlangen–Nuremberg, MD, 1843; Royal College of Physicians of Edinburgh, LRCP, 1859
- Spouse: Ann Bodington (m. 1827)
- Children: 6
- Relatives: Alice Bodington (daughter-in-law); Oliver Bodington (grandson); Nicolas Bodington (great-grandson)

George Bodington (1799–1882) was a British general practitioner and pulmonary specialist.

== Career ==
Bodington was born in 1799 in Calverton, Buckinghamshire. Educated at Magdalen College School, Bodington began an apprenticeship at age 17 under the surgeon Mr Sayer in Atherstone. A year later Bodington undertook a second apprenticeship under the surgeon Mr Wheelstone in the City of London.

Bodington continued his training at St Bartholomew's Hospital, which at the time did not have a formal medical college or grant formal qualifications. In 1825, Bodington obtained a Licentiate of the Society of Apothecaries.

== Career ==
Bodington became a physician and GP in Erdington (then in Warwickshire, now West Midlands).

His great professional interest was pulmonary disease and in 1836 he acquired the asylum and sanitorium at Driffold House, Maney, Sutton Coldfield.

In 1840 he published his essay, On the Treatment and Cure of Pulmonary Consumption, condemning contemporary treatments and advocating instead dry frosty air, gentle exercise, and a healthy diet. This was attacked by reviewers in the Lancet and he became disenheartened with his work.

In 1843, Bodington obtained his medical degree from the University of Erlangen–Nuremberg.

He later turned to the treatment of insanity. In 1851 the local census recorded eleven "lunatics" and six staff, including the doctor and his family, at Driffold House. In 1859, Bodington was awarded a Licentiate of the Royal College of Physicians of Edinburgh.

At some point the asylum was moved to the White House, Maney, which was demolished in 1935 to provide a site for an Odeon cinema (now part of the Empire Cinemas group). In 1881 the Doctor was living at Manor Hill where his two daughters ran a girls boarding school. The census of that year shows nine pupils of which five were nieces.

He was also a local politician and served on the Sutton Corporation for forty years (having as usual being appointed for life).

== Personal life ==
On 6 October 1827, Bodington married Ann Bodington (née Fowler) at the Church of St Peter and St Paul in Aston. The couple had six children, the eldest of whom was George Fowler Bodington, a physician who specialised in mental disorders. The grandfather of the lawyer and writer Oliver Bodington and the Canadian radio announcer Maurice Bodington, Bodington was the great-grandfather of the journalist and intelligence officer Nicolas Bodington and the father-in-law of the writer Alice Bodington.

Bodington died on 5 February 1882 at Rocksall House, Sutton Coldfield.

== Works ==
- An Essay on the Treatment and Cure of Pulmonary Consumption. Longman, Orme, Brown, Green and Longmans. 1840.
