= Vilmart & Cie =

Coordinates: 49.1647364°N 4.0415345°E

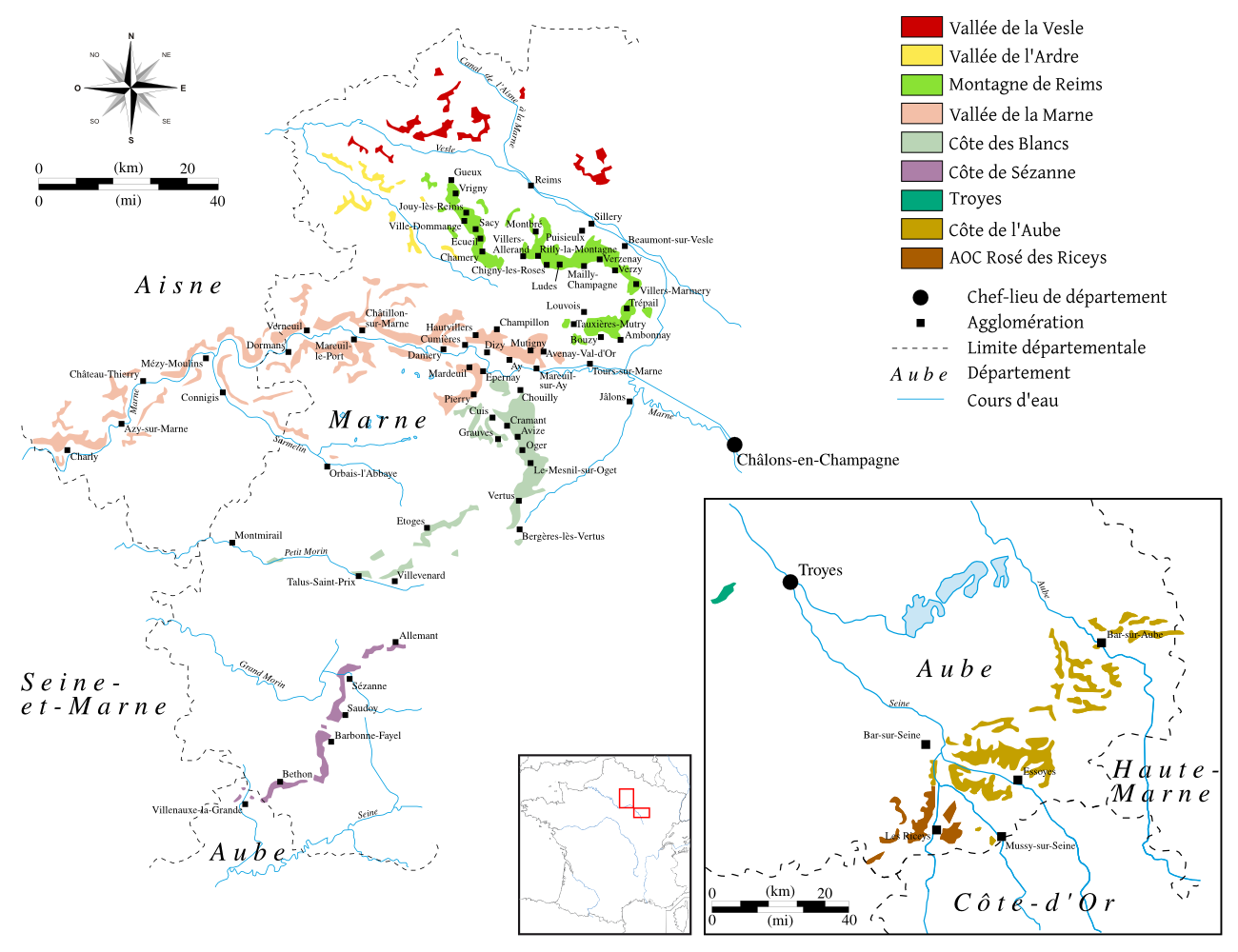
Vilmart & Cie is located in the Montagne de Reims region within the Champagne wine region

Vilmart & Cie is a Grower Champagne founded in 1890 in the Montagne de Reims region. Its Premier cru sites are in Rilly-la-Montagne and Villers-Allerand. On 11 hectares of vineyards the house produces 8,500 cases annually. The vineyards are planted with 60% chardonnay, 36% pinot noir, and 4% pinot meunier.

== See also ==
- List of Champagne houses
- Grower Champagne
- Biodynamic viticulture
