= Walther von Mumm =

German businessman and bobsledder

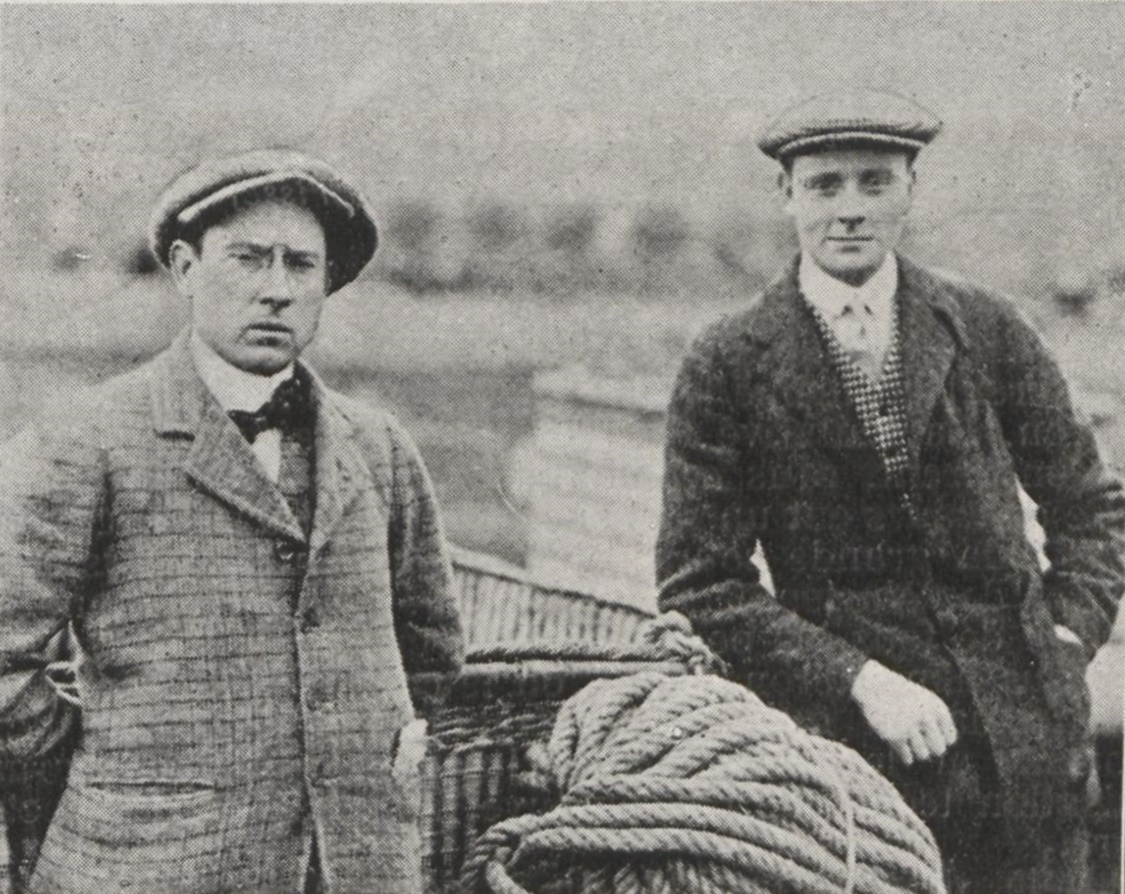
- George Blanchet (left) Mumm (right), November 1912

Personal information
- Nationality: German
- Born: January 13, 1887 Frankfurt am Main, Kingdom of Prussia, German Empire
- Died: August 10, 1959 (aged 72)

Sport
- Country: Germany
- Sport: Bobsled, Gas ballooning

Moritz Karl Ferdinand Wilhelm Hermann Walther Mumm von Schwarzenstein (13 January 1887 – 10 August 1959) was a German businessman and bobsledder who competed in the early 1930s. He was the one-time "champagne king" of Rheims in France, as part of the Mumm champagne making family.

== Early life ==
Von Mumm was born in Frankfurt am Main in 1887, son to Peter Arnold Gottlieb Hermann Mumm von Schwarzenstein and Emma Luise Marie Passavant.

Von Mumm's niece was prominent literary socialite, Elena Mumm Thornton Wilson, the fourth wife of Edmund Wilson, renowned essayist and critic. He was also related to Baron Alfons Mumm von Schwarzenstein, the German diplomat.

== Career ==
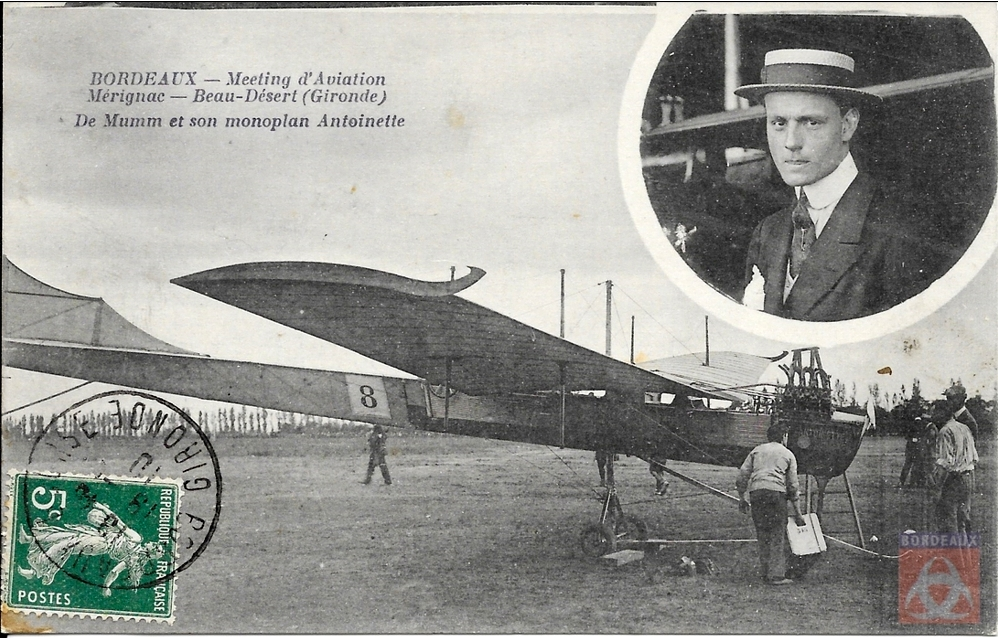
Bordeaux Beau-desert-Mérignac aviation week, September 1910

He was an aviation pioneer who went to the United States in 1910 as pilot of the French entry in the Gordon Bennett Cup.

Von Mumm returned to Germany at the outbreak of World War I. As his champagne winery was confiscated by the French, von Mumm sacrificed the prosperous 100-plus-year-old family business. After the war, von Mumm salvaged little of his fortune, and lost what remained in the 1929 Wall Street crash. Thus, the "champagne king" saw his fortunes wither until he was living in a $10-a-week Manhattan boarding house.

=== Olympic career ===
An avid sportsman, shortly after his accident he took part in the bobsleigh four-man event at the 1932 Winter Olympics in Lake Placid, New York. His team finished seventh and last; however, Germany won a bronze medal overall. The gold medal was given to the USA.

== Personal life ==
While in the U.S., he met Frances Scoville, daughter of Mary Lincoln (née Bergen) Scoville and Courtney C. K. Scoville, a Kansas lawyer and banker. They were married at St George's, Hanover Square in London in June 1913 and she was given away by her brother-in-law, Louis S. Treadwell. Guests at the wedding included Anthony Joseph Drexel III, the Earl and Countess of Portarlington, Count György Festetics, Chauncey McKeever and Mrs. Charles B. Wright. Before her death in France in 1920, they were the parents of one daughter:

- Mary Mumm von Schwarzenstein (1915-1938), who was educated at a school in Aiken, South Carolina; she died in an automobile accident together with her aunt, Josephine Scoville Treadwell.

Between meeting and marrying Frances Scoville, von Mumm became involved with Marie Van Rensimer, a former waitress from Philadelphia known for her wealthy lovers and admirers. After he became engaged to Scoville in 1912, he traveled from St. Moritz to Paris to tell Marie who shot him in his left lung her at her Paris apartment. Society barrister Oliver Bodington represented Mrs. Van Rensimer Barnes.

=== Second marriage ===
In 1924 von Mumm married Baroness Marie Julia Mathilde von dem Bussche-Haddenhausen, a daughter of Baron Hilmar von dem Bussche-Haddenhausen and Argentinian heiress, María Eleonore Martínez de Hoz. The couple divorced in 1928 and, in 1932, she married Prince Ulrich of Wchinitz and Tettau.

=== Suicide attempt ===
In 1931, he tried to take his own life by shooting himself above the heart in the Long Island home of his old friend William H. vom Rath. His suicide note read: "Bury me as I am and keep this out of the newspapers." Von Mumm rallied and recovered.

== See also ==
- List of pilots awarded an Aviator's Certificate by the Aéro-Club de France in 1910
