= Tsuguharu Foujita =

Japanese-French painter (1886–1968)

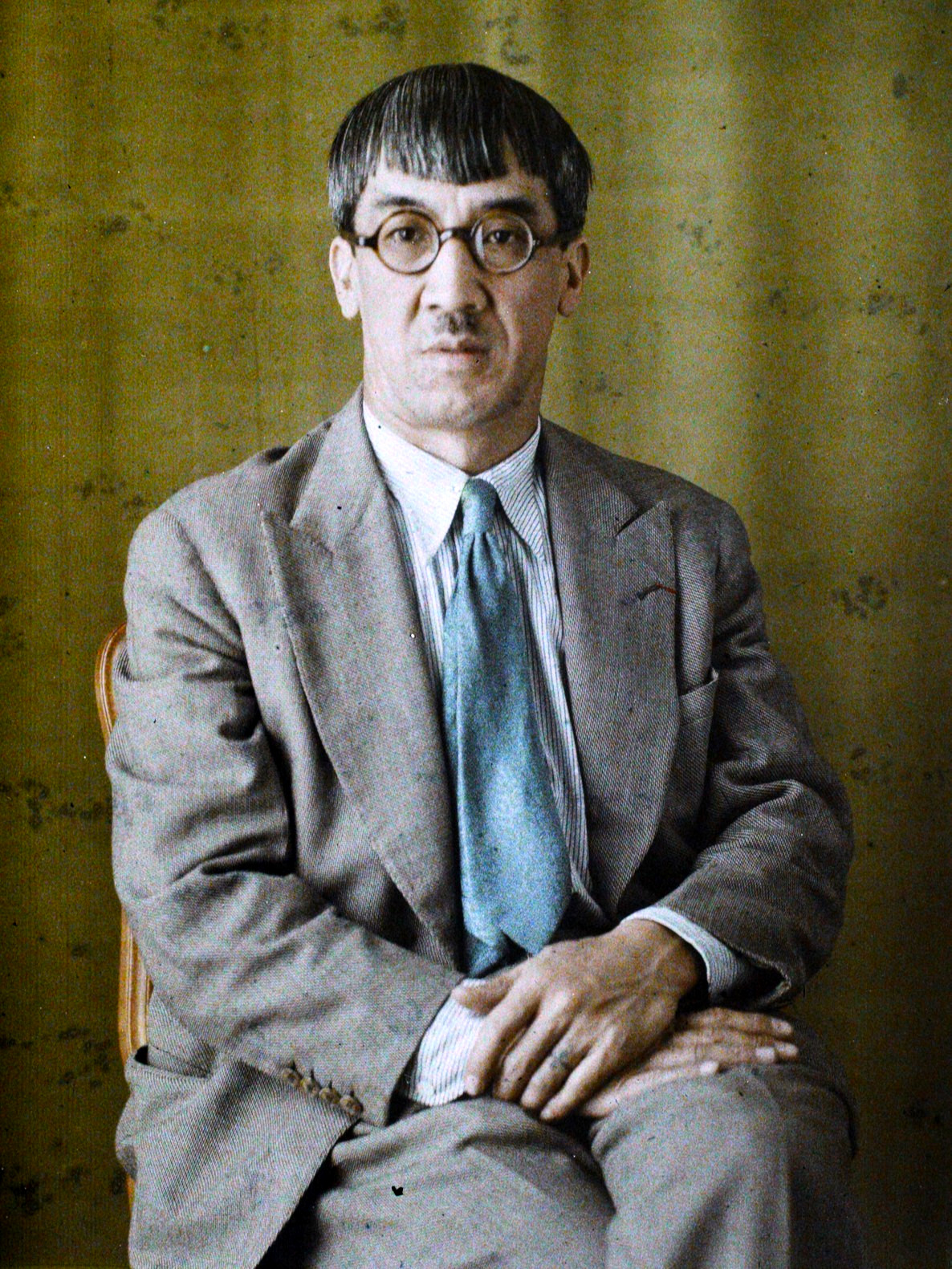
- 1930 autochrome by Georges Chevalier
- Born: Tsuguharu Fujita; 27 November 1886; Tokyo, Japan
- Died: 29 January 1968 (aged 81); Zürich, Switzerland
- Education: Tokyo National University of Fine Arts and Music
- Known for: Painting; printmaking
- Movement: School of Paris
- Spouses: Tomiko Tokita (m. 1912–1917) Fernande Barrey (m. 1917–1926): Lucie Badoul (1926–1930s); Madeleine Lequeux (1930s–1950s); Kimiyo Horiuchi (m. 1955)

Léonard Tsuguharu Foujita (藤田 嗣治, Fujita Tsuguharu; 27 November 1886 – 29 January 1968) was a Japanese-French painter. After studying Western-style painting in Japan, Foujita travelled to Paris, where he encountered the international modern art scene of the Montparnasse neighbourhood and developed an eclectic style that borrowed from both Japanese and European artistic traditions.

With his unusual fashion and distinctive figurative style, Foujita reached the height of his fame in 1920s Paris. His watercolour and oil works of nudes, still lifes, and self-portraits were a commercial success and he became a notable figure in the Parisian art scene.

Foujita spent three years traveling through South and North America before returning to Japan in 1933, documenting his observations in sketches and paintings. Upon his return home, Foujita became an official war artist during World War II, illustrating battle scenes to raise the morale of the Japanese troops and citizens. His oil paintings won him acclaim during the war, but public perception of him became mixed following the Japanese defeat.

Without significant prospects in the post-war Japanese art scene, Foujita returned to France in 1950, where he would spend the rest of his life. He received French nationality in 1955 and converted to Catholicism in 1959. His latter years were spent working on the frescoes for a small, Romanesque chapel in Reims that he had constructed. He died in 1968, shortly after the chapel officially opened.

In France, Foujita is remembered as part of the années folles of the 1920s, but public opinion of him in Japan remains mixed due to his monumental depictions of the war. Retrospective exhibitions organized since 2006 in Japan have sought to establish Foujita's place in Japanese twentieth-century art history.

== Biography ==
=== Early life in Japan and career beginnings: 1886–1913 ===
Foujita was born in 1886 in Ushigome, a former ward of Tokyo that is now part of the Shinjuku Ward. He was the son of Fujita Tsuguakira Fujita, an Army Medical Director. Two years after his birth, the family moved to Kumamoto, on the island of Kyushu. Following the premature death of his mother and his father's subsequent remarriage, the family moved back to Tokyo in 1892.

Foujita developed an interest in painting in primary school and as an adolescent decided to become a painter. When he was fourteen, one of Foujita's watercolors was exhibited at the Exposition Universelle in Paris as one of the representative artworks by Japanese middle schoolers.

Foujita began studying French as a high schooler and hoped to study in France after finishing school. However, his father, after consulting with his friend Ōgai Mori, a surgeon and novelist who had previously lived in Germany, encouraged him to continue his studies in fine art in Japan. He enrolled in 1905 at what is now the Tokyo National University of Fine Arts and Music and studied under Seiki Kuroda, who taught yōga, western-style painting. He also took courses on nihonga, Japanese-style painting, led by Seihō Takeuchi and Gyokushō Kawabata.

Foujita met his first wife, Tomiko Tokita, a school teacher, during a voyage to Chiba Prefecture during which he realized a number of paintings for his diploma, including the artist's first known self-portrait. The two married in 1911.

Foujita graduated in 1910. He exhibited in 1910 as part of the Salon Hakuba-Kai (White Horse Association), organized by Seiki Kuroda, which sought to popularize yōga with the Japanese public, and later at the first two exhibitions organized by Tokyo Kangyo, a structure that promoted art and industry. However, his paintings were refused for three consecutive years at the salon Bunten, an annual exhibition organized by the Ministry of Education. Foujita's paintings at this time—before he moved to France—were often signed "Fujita", rather than the francized "Foujita" which he later adopted.

Unsure of his personal style and never having lost sight of his dream to travel to Paris, Foujita decided to leave in 1913, when he was 27 years old. It was decided that he would receive an annuity from his father for three years, so that the artist would return to his home and his wife in Japan at the age of 30.

=== Arrival in Paris: 1913–1917 ===
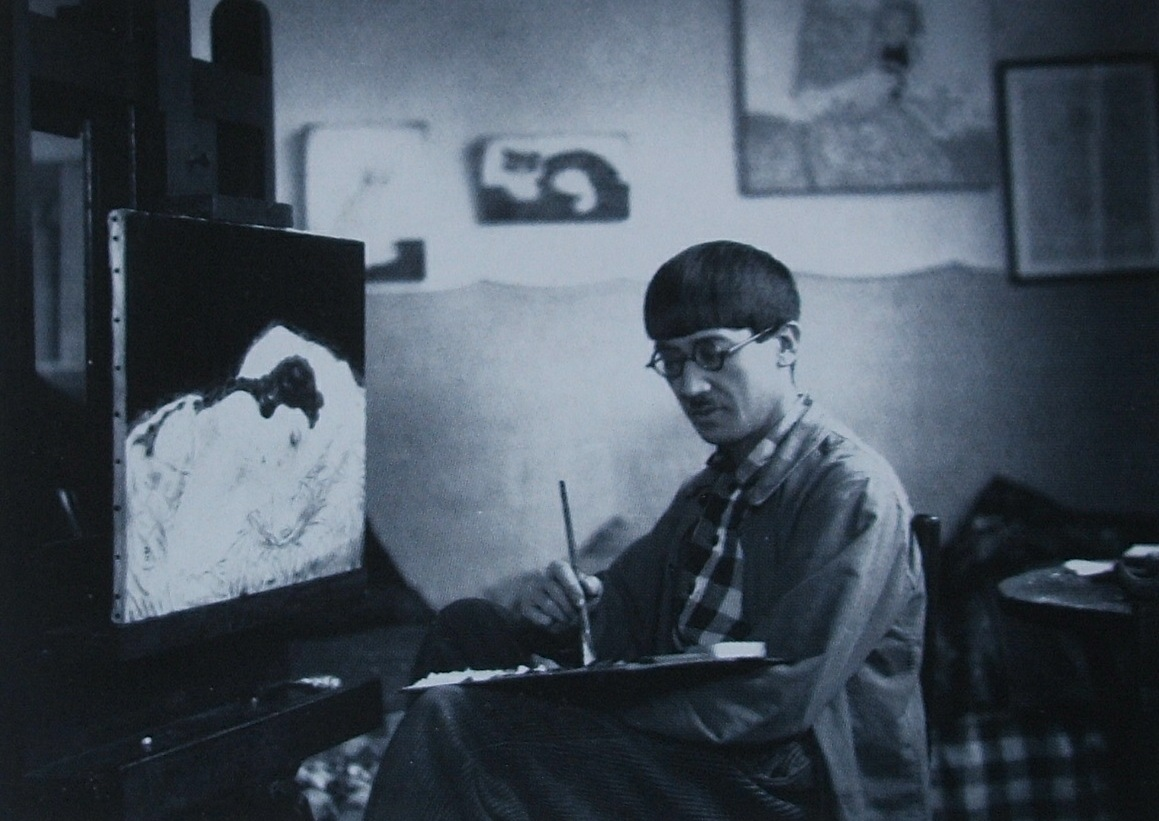
Foujita in his studio

Foujita moved to Paris in 1913, at a time when foreign artists flourished, hoping to develop their artistic sensibilities and gain recognition in the European art capital. He settled in Montparnasse, and quickly became part of the eclectic art scene there that, lacking a clear style or discipline, later became known as the École de Paris (School of Paris). He moved into the artists' residences at Bateau-Lavoir. He quickly made friends with the Japanese painter Riichirō Kawashima, who had many connections in the Paris art scene, as they shared a studio. Foujita also developed a friendship with photographer Shinzo Fukuhara, who piqued Foujita's interest in photography.

While many Japanese artists who came to Paris tended to live amongst themselves and struggled to adjust to the Parisian lifestyle, Foujita made great efforts to adapt to his new surroundings. He began signing his paintings with the French-looking spelling of his name, Foujita, rather than Fujita, and improved his French language skills. He also distinguished himself from many of his Japanese confrères, who sought to affirm their mastery of oil paint, as Foujita worked primarily in watercolor.

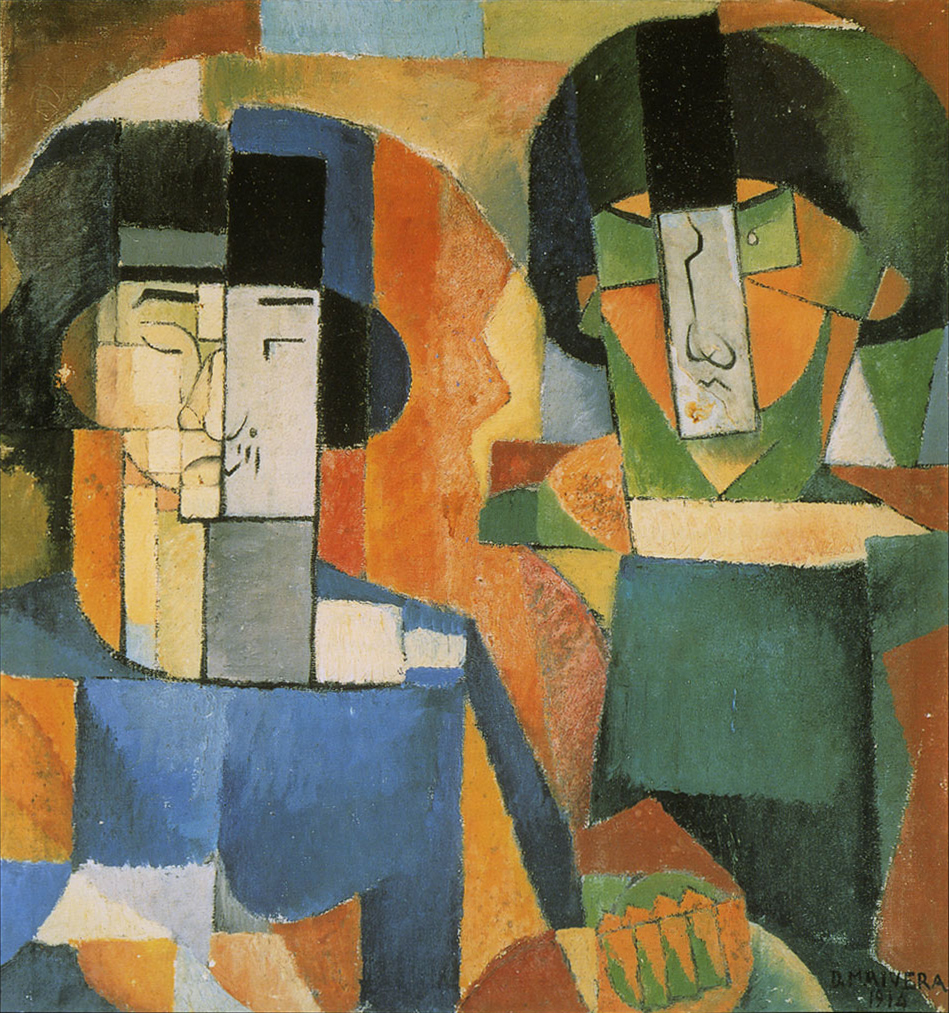
Portrait of Mr Kawashima and Foujita by Diego Rivera, (1914)

His network soon included artists of many nationalities. After moving his studio to the Cité Falguière, he met painters Amedeo Modigliani and Chaim Soutine, he took dance classes with Raymond Duncan, and he visited the studios of Pablo Picasso and Diego Rivera. This fruitful encounter, during which Foujita discovered cubism, led to his acquaintance with Guillaume Apollinaire, Georges Braque, Fernand Léger, Erik Satie, Kees van Dongen, Jean Metzinger, André Derain and Pierre Bonnard. His visit to Picasso's studio introduced him to the "naïve" style of Henri Rousseau, as Picasso owned one of Rousseau's works and had it hanging on his wall.

1914 marked the outbreak of World War I and the beginning of a complicated period for Foujita. Many foreign artists left Paris to fight in the war. Most Japanese artists also chose to return home. However, after having purchased a plot of land on the outskirts of Paris where they built a modest home, Foujita and Kawashima decided to stay. In the coming months, the two artists would work as volunteers, alongside sculptor Ossip Zadkine, for the Red Cross. In September, they returned to their home to find it destroyed. Additionally, Foujita had a financially difficult time because his father was no longer able to send him his annuity due to the war.

Following the departure of Kawashima for Tokyo in 1915, Foujita moved to London in January 1916. During this period, Foujita ended his relationship with his wife Tomiko. He also informed his father that he no longer needed financial support and would be staying indefinitely in Europe. Foujita returned to Paris in early 1917. In March, he met Fernande Barrey, who had been a model for Modigliani, in the Café de la Rotonde. Thirteen days later, Foujita and Fernande were married.

=== Artistic development and success: 1917–1930 ===
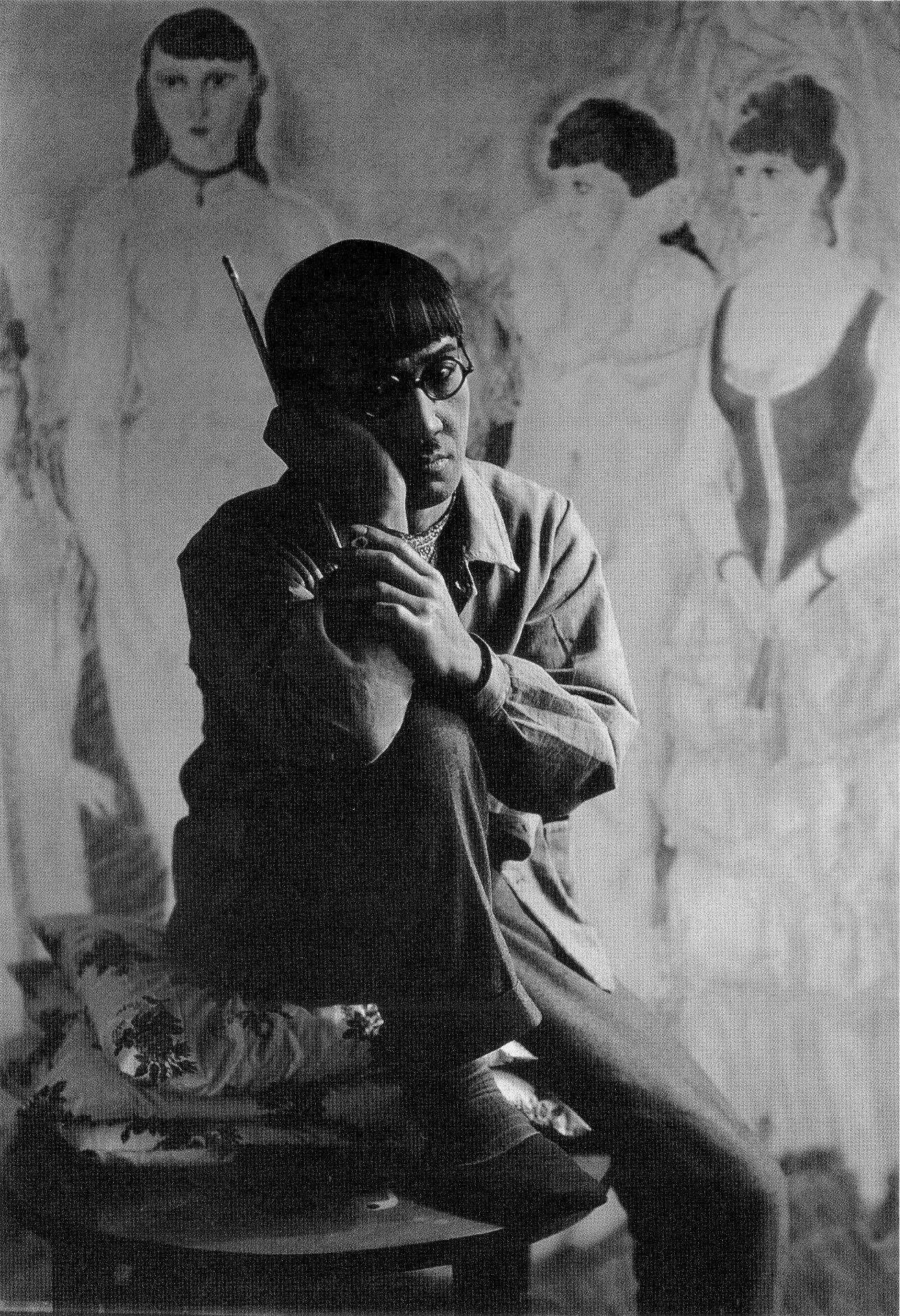
Portrait of Foujita, 1926–1927, by Nakayama Iwata

Fernande was instrumental in the artist's first professional success in Paris. A few weeks after marrying Foujita, she showed the art dealer Georges Chéron some of Foujita's drawings. Chéron went to Foujita's studio and bought all the works he was shown. She also secured an arrangement between Foujita and the Galerie Chéron, where he had his first solo exhibitions. His first solo show, in which he presented 110 of his watercolors, was a great success. The artist began exhibiting more frequently in Paris and in 1920 became a member of the Salon d'Automne.

This success coincided with the arrival of the Roaring Twenties in Paris, a time of relative economic prosperity that fueled a strong art market and thriving nightlife. Foujita was a regular at popular clubs and events, immediately recognizable thanks to his signature bowl-cut and round glasses.

Foujita's production in the early 1920s began to concentrate into three distinct genres: self-portraits, interior scenes (including many still lifes), and nudes. There was great interest in Foujita's style, which was often perceived as marrying "Eastern" and "Western" elements in an original manner.

Japanese artists in Paris who practiced Western-style painting were generally described by contemporary critics as simple copyists, or, in the words of André Warnod, "wanting to be European at all costs". Yet, Foujita was deemed the exception to this rule. Warnod states that Foujita "knew how to look with his own eyes and paint according to his temperament, without worrying too much about others": compared to other Japanese painters, Foujita was seen as having "personality". Art historian Asato Ikeda has argued that "in contrast to other Japanese artists in the city, Fujita [targeted] his paintings to French audiences by successfully negotiating the artistic heritage of his country and making something original from the perspective of European art history".

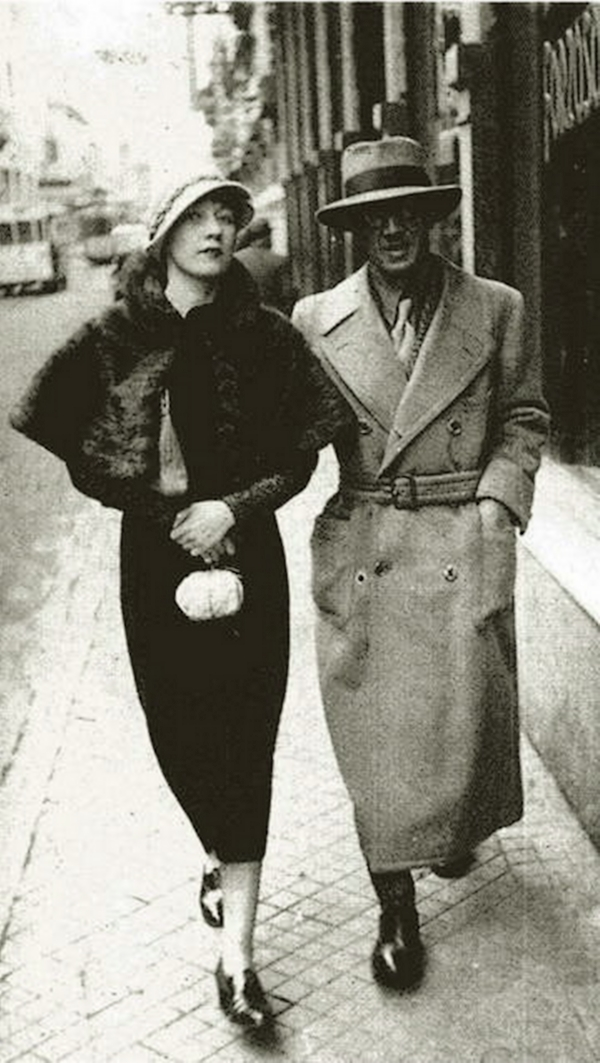
Kiki de Montparnasse and Tsuguharu Foujita, Paris, 1926, by Iwata Nakayama

Foujita's works in the late 1910s incorporated a blend of styles. From the beginning of his stay in Paris, Foujita took advantage of his proximity to the Louvre to study artists such as Raphael, Rembrandt, and Leonardo da Vinci. In 1917, Foujita began drawing figures in a highly stylized manner, often in profile, which appear to draw on both medieval primitive painting, as well as Amadeo Modigliani's simplified portraits. The artist, heavily inspired by Italian painting, also depicted Christian themes like the Virgin and Child and the Crucifixion of Christ. These themes would soon disappear from Foujita's oeuvre, but they later dominated his artistic production from 1951 onwards.

His works were appreciated as the harmonious meeting of Japanese and European aesthetics. One such painting, Reclining Nude with Toile de Jouy, for which French model Kiki de Montparnasse posed, was met with great success at the 1922 Salon d'Automne. This work referenced the classical genre of the nude, as well as more recent French examples like Edouard Manet's Olympia. He drew inspiration from ukiyo-e artists such as Suzuki Harunobu and Kitagawa Utamaro, who left their female figures' skin uncolored, though he painted the Black artists' model and performer Aïcha Goblet in a more Cubist style. Foujita wrote that the objective of his nudes was to "represent the quality of the most beautiful material there is: that of human skin".

Foujita received an important Parisian commission in the late 1920s that showcased his capacity to create in the Japanese artistic tradition. Painted at the Cercle de l'Union Interalliée, an exclusive social and dining club, it features two kachō-ga, or bird and flower painting panels created in a yamato-e style.

In 1922, Foujita met Lucie Badoul, whom he called "Youki", the Japanese word for "snow", and she became one of his models. In 1924, he divorced Fernande, and in 1929, he married Youki. Around the time of his marriage to Youki, Foujita was having serious financial woes. He had been living a luxurious life of celebrity in Paris but he had not been paying taxes since 1925. Now, the tax authorities caught up with him and demanded full payment. Foujita left for Japan with Youki, hoping he might be able to recoup his losses by exhibiting there. Foujita's reception in Japan was mixed. The general public packed his first one-man show there, and his works sold well, but the critics panned him as a mediocre artist imitating Western style. Foujita returned to France via the United States, traveling to Hawai'i, San Francisco, and New York. While in New York, he learned about the Wall Street Crash. He once again briefly returned to New York to organize a one-man exhibition at the Paul Reinhardt Gallery, but the show was not successful.

=== Travels, 1930–1933 ===
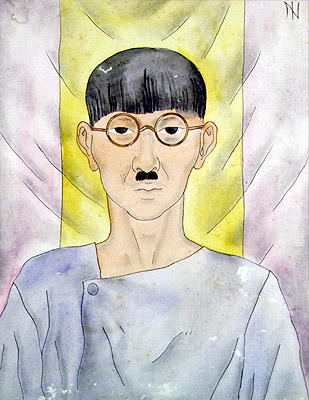
Portrait of Foujita by Ismael Nery (1930)

When Foujita returned to Paris in 1930, he was still short on funds, and shared a place with Robert Desnos whom he had met in 1928. During this time, Foujita experimented with painting in a more surrealist style. By 1931, Youki and Desnos had become a couple, and Foujita, who continued to have problems with his back taxes and suffered bankruptcy, left for South America with Madeleine Lequeux, a former dancer known as Mady Dormans who worked at the Casino de Paris.

Foujita and Madeleine traveled together to Brazil, staying in Rio de Janeiro for four months. During this time, they met Ismael Nery, who painted Foujita's portrait. After Brazil, they then went to Argentina. His exhibition in Buenos Aires was very successful and he stayed for five months. Afterwards, they traveled to Bolivia, Peru, and Cuba.

Foujita then went to Mexico, arriving in November 1932, where he would stay for seven months. Foujita found himself inspired by the Mexican Mural Movement, led by Diego Rivera, whom he had befriended in Paris. Impressed by the collaborative effort undertaken by the government and local artists, Foujita, as art historian Asato Ikeda describes, "claimed that art should not be produced just for wealthy individuals but also for the masses and the general public. In other words, his trip to South America made him aware of the social and political roles that large public art could play."

He also visited the artist Tamiji Kitagawa at his home in Taxco. Foujita had learned about Kitagawa through an exhibit of his student's plein-air works that had traveled through Europe. Foujita was so impressed by Kitagawa's students' works that he had sixty of the canvases brought back to Japan for an exhibition that was held in 1936. After his visit to Mexico, Foujita traveled through the Southwest of the United States, and then went on to San Francisco and Los Angeles, where he continued to exhibit and be treated as a celebrity.

=== Return to Japan and war painting: 1933–1949 ===
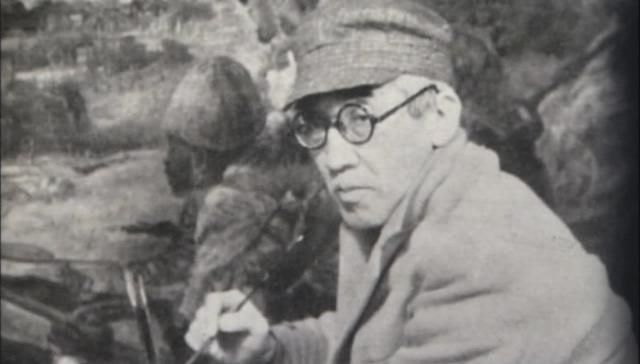
Foujita in the Army Art Association

Foujita returned to Japan with Madeleine at the end of 1933. Madeleine found the transition to Japanese culture difficult. In February 1935, she went back to Paris, but returned a year later. In June 1936, she unexpectedly died. Soon afterwards, Foujita began a relationship with Kimiyo Horiuchi, who in 1954 became his fifth wife.

During this time, Foujita's paintings began to be dominated by classical Japanese subjects, such as geisha, sumo wrestlers, and fishermen. His watercolors and oils received negative press when they were exhibited at the 21st Salon Nika in 1934. Critics felt as if his vision of Japan was old-fashioned and resembled that of a foreigner, with one critic noting that "the people and the scenes represented by this painter are not from the living and current Japan, but worn-out remnants from the past". Foujita's taste for bygone Japan was further confirmed in 1937 when he constructed a traditional Japanese home.

1937 marked the beginning of the Second Sino-Japanese War. Foujita sought to contribute to the war effort by going to the front, and these civilian volunteers formed the Association of War Artists of Imperial Japan. In 1938, Foujita began working with the Imperial Navy Information Office establishment as a war artist and created his first war painting (sensō ga), Nanchang Airport Fire.

In April 1939, the army reorganized the Association of War Artists of Imperial Japan as the Army Art Association, which commissioned monumental war paintings under the supervision of a new chairman, Matsui Iwane, who was an active military officer. Foujita and his fellow artist, Saburō Miyamoto were prominent members, and in 1943 Foujita became vice-chairman. In spite of his strong connections with the Army Art Association, Foujita decided to return to Paris in April 1939. He and Kimiyo stayed there for slightly more than a year, leaving France and returning to Japan in May 1940 after the German invasion of Belgium.

Upon return to Tokyo, Foujita dedicated himself as an artist supporting the war effort. He became the nation's leading war artist during World War II, creating a prolific number of war paintings and overseeing special exhibits for the military. He received important commissions, like the Battle of Nomonhan, painted in 1941, a monumental painting measuring 1.5 m × 4.5 m (4 ft 11 in × 14 ft 9 in). Despite the painting's depiction of one of the largest military defeats the Japanese had experienced up to that time, it focuses on glorifying the bravery of the Japanese soldiers.

Masaaki Ozaki divides Foujita's wartime production into two periods: the paintings of the first period, like Battle of Nomonhan, were supposed to document the war and boost the morale of troops. The second period, however, was a time in which the Japanese were experiencing more defeat than victory. The Japanese people began to lose confidence and the war effort became more desperate. The sources for Foujita's paintings were not the battlefields themselves, but his imagination, resulting in shocking dramatic compositions that Ozaki compares to representations of hell found in classical Japanese painting. Art historian Aya Louise McDonald also points out that his compositions were further enriched by Foujita's knowledge of 19th-century French painting in the Louvre.

His most famous painting from this period is Last Stand at Attu, completed in August 1943, which depicts a battle against American troops on the Aleutian Islands. Rather than surrendering to the Americans, the Japanese soldiers remaining in battle killed themselves. The work received visceral responses from viewers, who wept or prayed in front of it, as if it were an altar. Foujita made paintings in a similar vein to Last Stand at Attu until the war's end in 1945.

Following Japan's defeat, the Allied Powers in Japan made an effort to collect all war paintings to be sent to the United States, with Foujita's help. The paintings have never been officially "returned" to Japan, but they were placed on "indefinite loan" to the National Museum of Modern Art, Tokyo, which received the paintings from 1970 to 1977.

Foujita received much public criticism after the war in Japan. He defended himself by asserting that artists were pacifists in nature, but the Japan Art Association (Nihon Bijutsu-kai) listed him as an artist responsible for the war in 1946. Although Foujita's name did not appear on the list of war criminals published by the General Headquarters in 1947, his reputation suffered, partly due to using his art to serve as propaganda for the Imperial Japanese military and his refusal to confront accusations about his role as a war artist. The American poet Harry Roskolenko tried to support Foujita by putting on an exhibit of his paintings at the Kennedy and Company Galleries in New York, but none of the paintings were sold. Foujita and Roskolenko blamed Yasuo Kuniyoshi, who described Foujita as a fascist, imperialist, and expansionist. Ultimately, Foujita decided to leave Japan definitively.

=== Time in America and final years in France: 1949–1968 ===
Foujita was able to get a visa to the United States with the help of Henry Sugimoto and took up a teaching position at the Brooklyn Museum Art School in March 1949. Foujita put on another show, but was once more labelled a fascist by artists, including Ben Shahn, who organized a demonstration against him. His paintings of the time reflect a nostalgia for Paris. Unhappy and unwelcome in New York, Foujita sought to return to Paris, and once his visa was granted, Foujita and Kimiyo moved back to France in January 1950. Foujita declared that he would never leave again.

The couple moved to Montparnasse where Foujita began painting street scenes that he called "Paris Landscapes". He briefly became involved with costume design, creating the "Japanese" outfits for the May 1951 performance of Madame Butterfly at La Scala, (Note: An exhibition organized in the new Prada building of Tōkyō ... presented the costumes designed by Foujita for the performance [of Madame Butterfly] given in May 1951 at La Scala.) and did illustrations for a book by René Héron de Villefosse In 1954, Foujita married Kimiyo. They gained French nationality in 1955, renouncing their Japanese nationality, and Foujita was made an officer of the Legion of Honor by the French state in 1957. The couple converted to Catholicism and were baptised in Reims Cathedral on 14 October 1959, with René Lalou, the head of the Mumm Champagne House, and Françoise Taittinger as his godfather and godmother. Foujita took the Christian name of Léonard.

After his conversion in 1959, Foujita dedicated most of his production to the creation of religious subjects. In 1962, Foujita created a plan to construct and decorate his own chapel, as Matisse had done before him. Foujita hoped that the structure, named the Chapel of Our Lady of Peace and built with the help of Lalou's funding, would symbolize the completion of his career. As it turned out, the chapel would also be the artist's final project. From 1963 until its opening to the public in 1966, he designed almost every aspect of the structure, decorating the interior with frescoes of biblical scenes, many of which illustrated the life of Christ.

Only a few months after the opening of the chapel, Foujita was diagnosed with cancer. He died on 29 January 1968 in Zürich, Switzerland. He was first interred in the chapel, but Kimiyo had his body transferred to the Cimetière de Villiers-le-Bâcle, near her. In 2003, his coffin was reinterred at the Foujita Chapel under the flagstones in the position he originally intended when constructing the chapel.

== Legacy and collections ==
After the war, Foujita had a reputation in Japan as a war criminal. Writing in 1972, the artist Kikuhata Mokuma published an essay in the art magazine Bijutsu techō arguing that Foujita was one of many artists responsible for the horrors of war, describing Foujita as a narcissistic artist who took pleasure in depicting death. Foujita's reputation, and his place in Japanese twentieth-century art history, remains a contested subject in Japan today. A successful retrospective of his work was held at the National Museum of Modern Art, Tokyo, in 2006, entitled Léonard Foujita: Non-Japanese Who Fascinated Paris, and others have followed, indicating the will of Japanese museums to engage with Foujita's oeuvre. The 2006 retrospective featured five war paintings in an effort to address his war responsibility.

In France, Foujita remains associated primarily with the École de Paris and the années folles of the Roaring Twenties. He is known for his lighthearted and dainty subjects: Parisian streetscapes, cats, voluptuous women, everyday objects. An important exhibition of his work at the Musée Maillol in 2018, Foujita: peindre dans les années folles (Note: Translation: Foujita: Painting in the Roaring Twenties) focused on his production before his return to Japan.

An exhibition presenting the ensemble of Foujita's work, including his wartime production, was organized by the Centre Pompidou and the Museum of Modern Art, Tokyo in 1980, but was canceled at the last minute. In 2019, the exhibition Foujita 1886–1968. Œuvres d'une vie (Note: Translation: Foujita 1886–1968. A Life's Work) organized at the Japanese Culture House of Paris and based on the exhibition Foujita: A Retrospective, shown at the Tokyo Metropolitan Art Museum in 2018, presented for the first time in France an overview of Foujita's sixty years of artistic production. It included two of the artist's war paintings, shown for the first time outside of Japan, permitting the French public to understand Foujita's career beyond his years in Montparnasse.

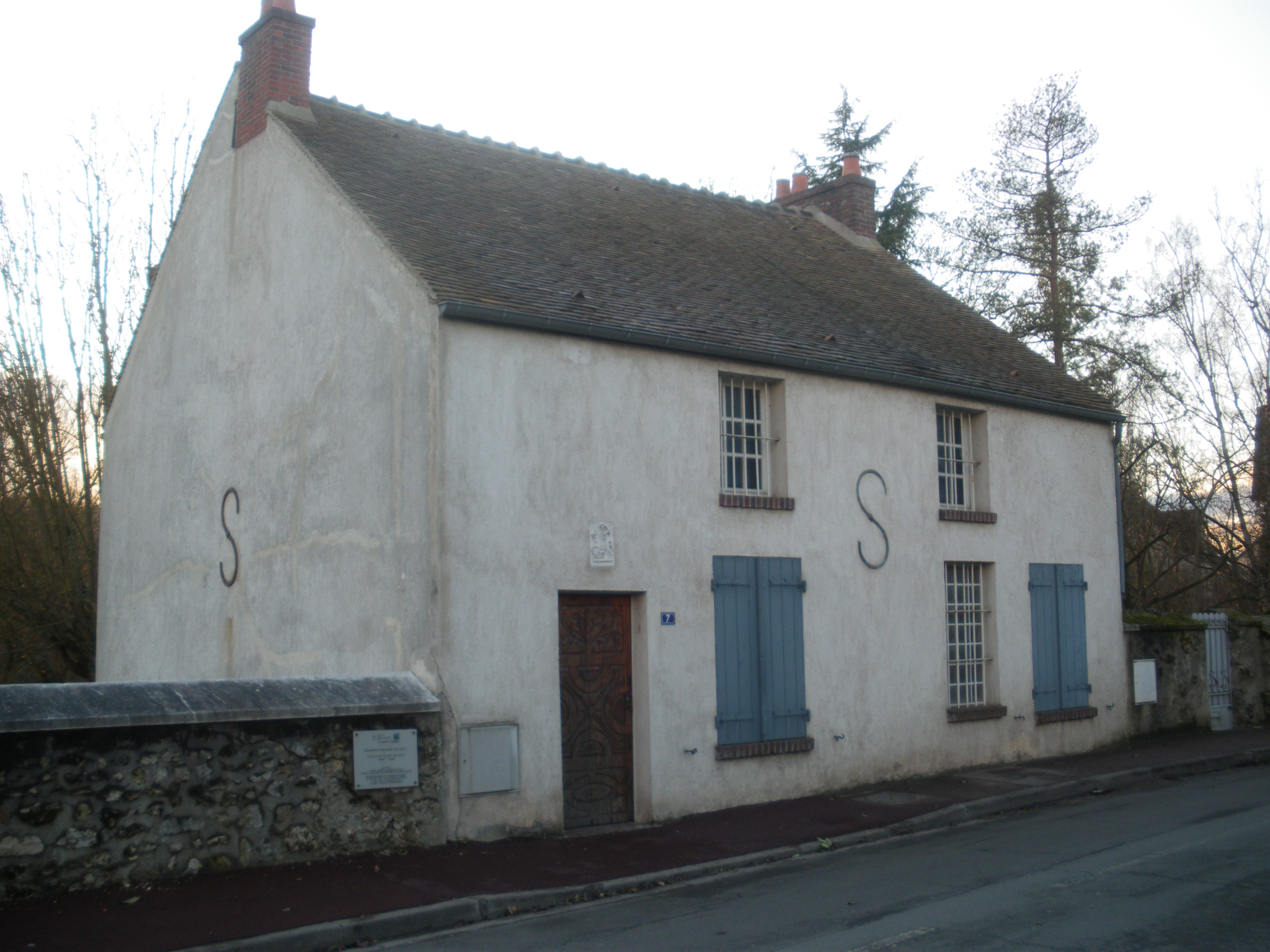
Maison-Atelier Foujita, Villiers le Bacle, Essonne, France

In 1990, Kimiyo Foujita donated the home she shared with the artist to the Departmental Council of Essonne so that Foujita's atelier could become a museum, the Maison-Atelier Foujita. In Japan, Foujita's works can be found in the Artizon Museum and the Museum of Contemporary Art in Tokyo, with more than 100 in the Hirano Masakichi Art Museum in Akita. His works are also part of major French collections, such as those of the Centre Pompidou, the Musée d'art moderne de la Ville de Paris, and Paris' Fonds national d'art contemporain. Further works can also be found at the Musée d'art moderne et contemporain of Strasbourg, the Musée de Grenoble, and the Musée de la Piscine in Roubaix. Foujita's nephew donated some of his works and writings to the Musée des beaux-arts of Reims in 2012.
