= Francis Brooke (cricketer, born 1810) =

British Army officer, landowner, and cricketer (1810–1886)

Captain Francis Brooke
- Born: Francis Capper Brooke; 18 September 1810; Ufford, Suffolk, England
- Died: 13 January 1886 (aged 75); Ufford, Suffolk, England
- Education: Christ Church, Oxford
- Spouses: Juliana Jemima Brooke (died 1840); Louisa Brooke (m. 1852)
- Children: 6, including Alice Bodington
- Military career
- Allegiance: British Army
- Branch: Grenadier Guards; Wilford Volunteer Rifles
- Cricket career

Cricket information

Domestic team information
- Years: Team
- 1836: Marylebone Cricket Club

Career statistics
Competition	First-class
Matches	1
Runs scored	8
Batting average	8.00
100s/50s	–/–
Top score	8
Catches/stumpings	1/–
- Source: Cricinfo, 8 September 2021

Captain Francis Capper Brooke (18 September 1810 – 13 January 1886) was a British Army officer, landowner and first-class cricketer.

The son of The Reverend Charles Brooke, he was born in September 1810 at Ufford, Suffolk. He was educated at Harrow School, where he played for the school cricket eleven and was Head of School in 1828. From Harrow he went up to Christ Church, Oxford. Brooke purchased the rank of ensign and lieutenant in the Grenadier Guards in November 1830, later purchasing the rank of captain in April 1834. Brooke made a single appearance in first-class cricket for the Marylebone Cricket Club (MCC) against Oxford University at Oxford in 1836. Batting once in the match, he opened the batting in the MCC first innings and was dismissed by J. C. Ryle for 8 runs; he did not opening the batting in the MCC second innings and was not called upon to bat, with the MCC reaching their fourth innings target of 87 for the loss of two wickets.

Brooke was appointed a captain in the Wilford Volunteer Rifles in January 1860, before resigning his commissions in December of the same year. He was appointed High Sheriff of Suffolk in February 1869, replacing Frederick William Schreiber.

== Personal life ==
Brooke was first married to Juliana Jemima Brooke (née Alix; 1818–1840), with whom he had the writer Alice Bodington. In 1852, Brooke married Louisa Brooke (née Duff) with whom he had 5 children.

Brooke died suddenly at Ufford in January 1886.
