= Edward William Derrington Bell =

Recipient of the Victoria Cross

Major-General Edward William Derrington Bell VC CB
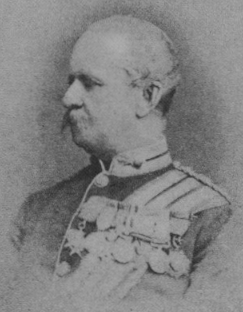
- Born: 18 May 1824; Essex, England
- Died: 10 November 1879 (aged 55); Belfast, Ireland
- Burial place: St. Mary the Virgin Churchyard, Kempsey
- Spouses: Alice Brooke (m. 1857; div. 1868); Charlotte Wadsworth Bartell (m. 1869)
- Children: 7
- Military career
- Allegiance: United Kingdom
- Branch: British Army
- Rank: Major-General
- Units: 23rd Regiment of Foot
- Conflicts: Crimean War; Indian Mutiny
- Awards: Victoria Cross; Companion of the Order of the Bath; Légion d'honneur (France); Order of the Medjidie (Ottoman Empire)

Major-General Edward William Derrington Bell, VC, CB (18 May 1824 – 10 November 1879) was a British Army officer and a recipient of the Victoria Cross, the highest award for gallantry in the face of the enemy that can be awarded to British and Commonwealth forces.

== Military career ==
Bell was the son of General Edward Wells Bell and entered the Royal Military College, Sandhurst, in 1838 at the age of 14. He was commissioned into the British Army in 1842 and was posted to Canada. He was promoted to captain in December 1848 and, during the Crimean War, was present at the Battles of Alma and Inkerman and the Siege of Sebastopol.

Bell was 30 years old, and a captain in the 23rd Regiment of Foot (later The Royal Welch Fusiliers) during the Crimean War when the following deed took place for which he was awarded the Victoria Cross (VC).

On 20 September 1854 in the Crimea, at the Battle of Alma, Captain Bell was the first to seize upon and capture one of the enemy's guns which was limbered up and being carried off. He moreover took over the command of his regiment, which he brought out of action, all his senior officers having been killed or wounded.

He was personally presented with the Victoria Cross by Queen Victoria at Southsea Common, Portsmouth, Hants on 2 August 1858.

Bell was also awarded the Legion of Honour by the French, and the Turkish War Medal. Posted to India during the Indian Mutiny in 1857, he was present at the Siege of Lucknow. After India, he commanded the 2nd Battalion of the Royal Welch Fusiliers for the next 12 years until 1872, achieving the rank of major general in 1868. His last command was in Belfast, where he died in 1879.

== Personal life ==
On 28 May 1857, Bell married the 17 year old (Note: Brooke's age was listed as 21 on the couple's marriage certificate.) Alice Brooke who was 16 years his junior. The couple had at least 3 children, of which only one survived to adulthood. The marriage was unhappy, and Brooke had an affair with Major Tyssen Sowley Holroyd (1838–1914) in 1865. Bell petitioned for a divorce in 1867, which was granted the following year.

Bell later married (Note: Bell is listed as a bachelor on the couple's marriage register.) Charlotte Wadsworth Bell, a widow, on 3 August 1869 with whom he had 4 children. On 10 November 1879, Bell died in Belfast aged 55. Bell is buried alongside his father at St. Mary the Virgin Churchyard in Kempsey, Worcestershire.
