= Egly-Ouriet =

Grower Champagne producer

Egly-Ouriet is a Grower Champagne producer.

Francis Egly is the fourth generation in the family business. Egly-Ouriet grand cru vineyards are located in Ambonnay, Verzenay and Bouzy; its premier cru Pinot Meunier vineyards are in Vrigny. Grand cru vineyards are planted to 70 percent Pinot Noir and 30 percent Chardonnay. The domaine chooses 3-4 years of barrel aging of the wine, far longer than most Champagne producers.

By 2023, Grower Champagne was among the top Grower Champagne producers to gain significant champagne market share. It was described by Eater as "the wine-geekiest grower Champagne of all". In 2024, it started distribution in Singapore Airlines' business class.

== Awards and honors ==
- Three stars in La Revue du vin de France’s Le guide des meilleurs vins de France.
- Top five producers of champagne by Andrew Jefford in The New France.

== See also ==
- Classification of Champagne vineyards
- Agrapart & Fils
