= Domaine Coche-Dury =

French wine grower and producer

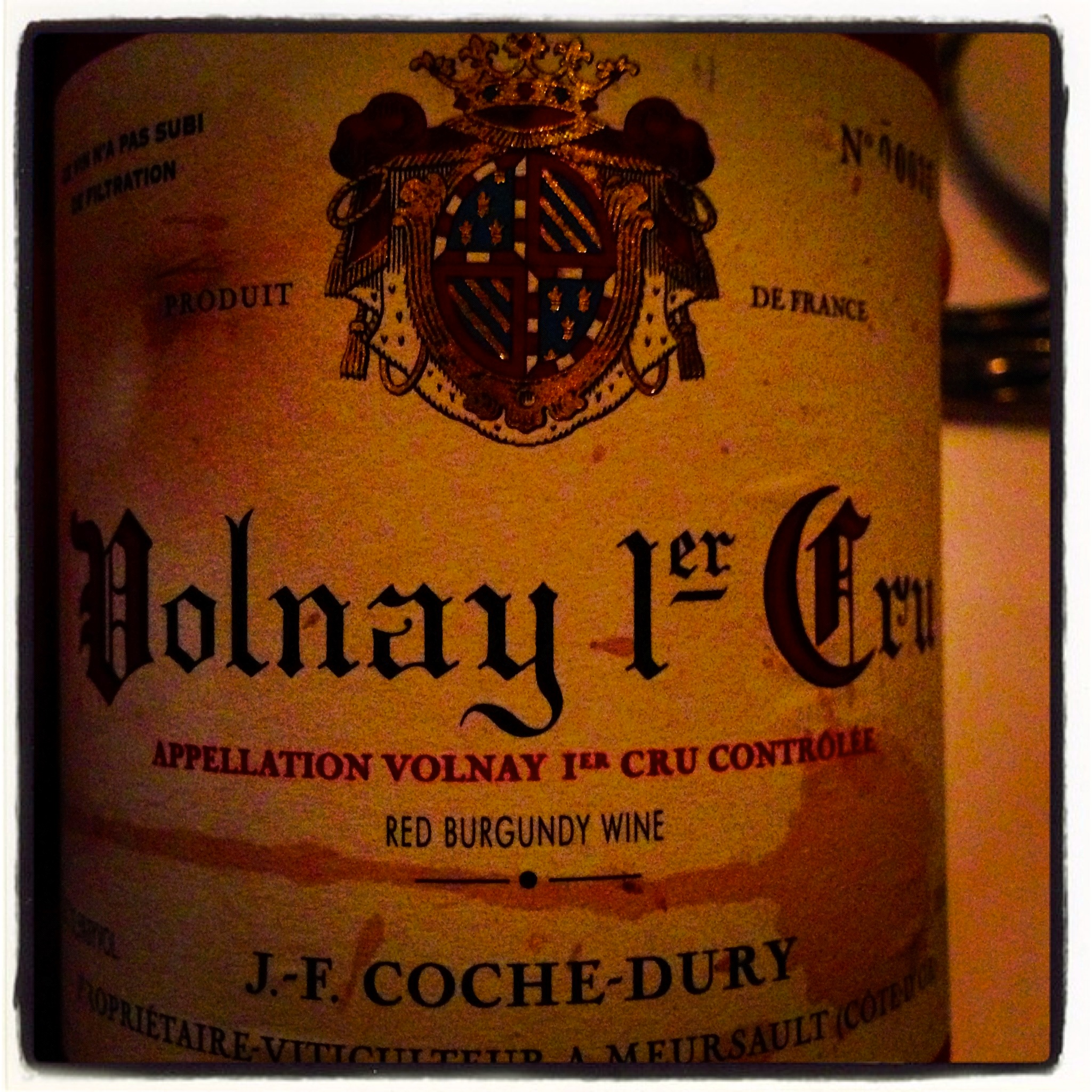
Coche Dury Volnay Premiere Cru

Domaine Coche-Dury is a French wine grower and producer. It is based in Meursault, in the Côte de Beaune wine region of Burgundy, France.

== History ==
The domaine was established in the 1920s by Léon Coche. Some vineyard plots with established grapevines were purchased and Léon bottled some wine himself as well as selling grapes to local negociants to bottle.

The vineyard land was passed down to Léon's three children, with Georges Coche taking control of his share in 1964 and continuing to run the estate and purchase new vineyard land.

Jean-François Coche took over from his father Georges, on his father's retirement in 1973. Jean-François's wife has the surname Dury which was added to the name of the estate.

In July 1998, Coche-Dury suffered damage to ten rows of its vines in Grand cru vineyard Corton-Charlemagne, after a helicopter spraying a neighboring parcel crashed.

In 1999 Jean-François was joined full-time by his son Raphaël Coche after Raphaël finished studying viticulture and oenology. Raphaël took over the winemaking role at the estate in 2010 with his father's retirement.

== Wines ==
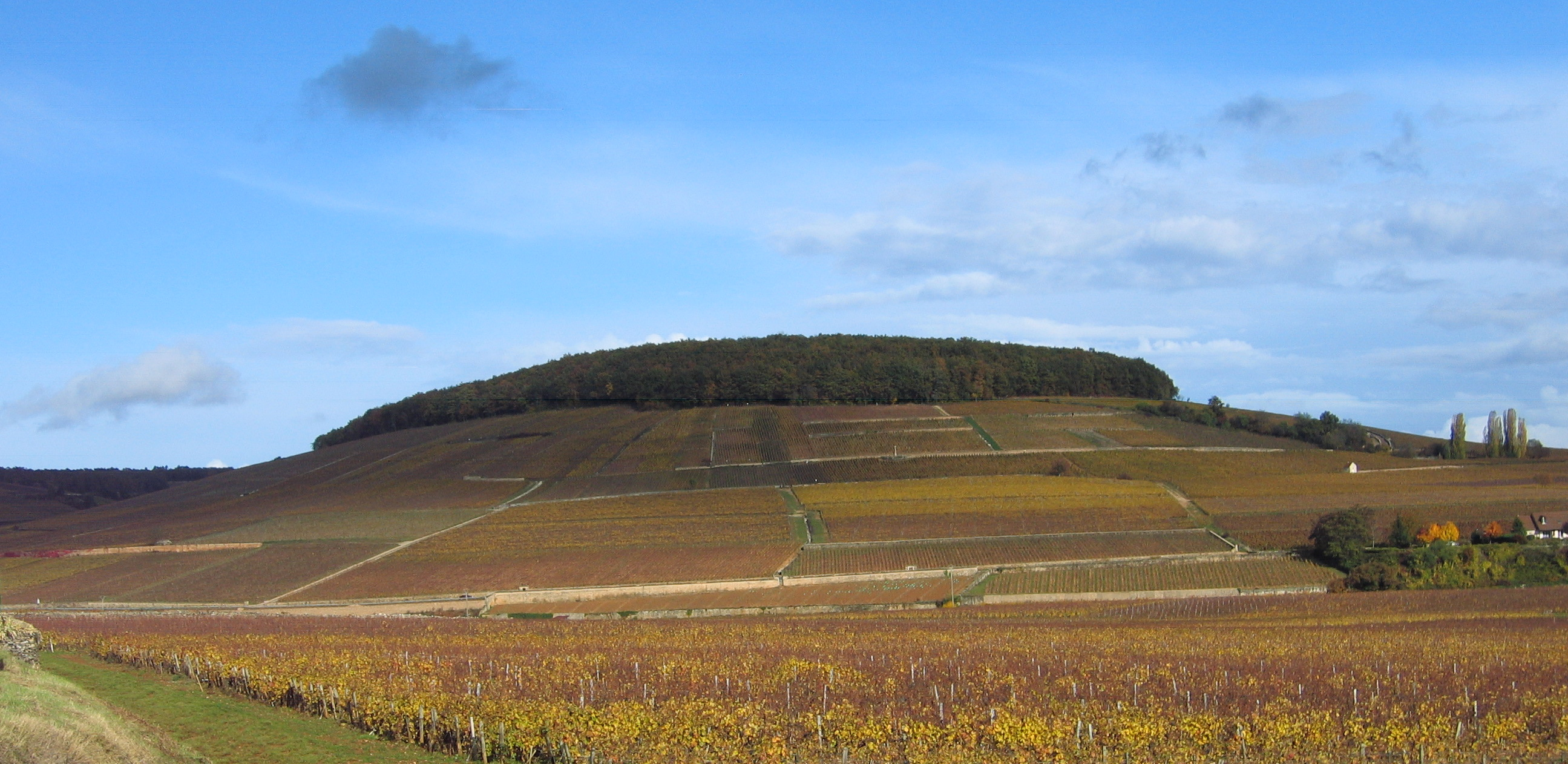
Corton hill, the source of Corton-Charlemagne produced by Coche-Dury

Coche-Dury cultivates around 9 hectares of vineyards and produces around 3,500 cases of estate bottled wine each year depending on the vintage conditions. The vineyards are planted with Aligoté, Chardonnay and Pinot noir grapevines. 70% of the harvested grapes are used by the domaine, with the remainder being sold to negociants including Louis Latour and Louis Jadot.

The domaine is best known for its white wines made from Chardonnay, with wine critics Clive Coates saying "This is one of the finest white wine domaines in the world" and describing Jean-François as "one of the superstars of white Burgundy", Robert M. Parker, Jr. saying "J.F. Coche-Dury is universally regarded as one of the five or six best white-wine makers in Burgundy", and Jancis Robinson noting that the estate is in her opinion "certainly the most reliable source of great white Burgundies".

The white wine Chardonnay vineyards cultivated by the estate include 0.34 hectares of Grand cru vineyard Corton-Charlemagne which was acquired in 1986 and three holdings of Premier Cru vineyards in Meursault with 0.5 acres in Perriéres, 0.18 acres in Caillerets and 0.21 acres in Genevriéres. Village classified vineyard holdings consist of 0.13 acres of Chevalières and 0.73 acres of Rougeots, both in Meursault, plus half an acre of the Puligny-Montrachet based Enseignières vineyard acquired in 1985.

In 2012, the domain acquired the previous hired Grand cru vineyard Corton-Charlemagne and doubled the surface whereof half of the plot is owned by the domain and the other half hired. Production will start in 2013.

A number of red wines are produced from Pinot noir grapes, vineyard holdings include 0.5 acres of Auxey-Duresses, 0.28 hectares of Monthelie, until 2012 0.34 hectares of Pommard Vaumuriens (then sold) and 0.39 acres of a Premier cru Volnay which is usually blended together but in 1999 was split into Clos des Chênes and Taillepieds specific bottlings.
