= Ivan LaHaie =

American electrical engineer

Ivan LaHaie is an American electrical engineer with Integrity Applications, Inc. in Ann Arbor, Michigan. He was named a Fellow of the Institute of Electrical and Electronics Engineers (IEEE) in 2014 (IEEE Antennas & Propagation Society) for his contributions to near-to-far field radar signature transformations and radar measurement error mitigation.
