= Benoît Lahaye =

French champagne producer

Benoît Lahaye is a Grower Champagne producer. He took over his family's domaine in the Montagne de Reims in 1993. The estate has 4.8 hectares (12 acres) of vines, became organic-certified in 2003, and biodynamic-certified in 2010. (Certified organic vineyards account for only around 1% of the total land in the Champagne wine region.) Eighty-eight percent of the vineyards are planted with pinot noir. Most of the vines are in Bouzy, there is one hectare (2.5 acres) in Ambonnay, and a bit of old vine Chardonnay in the Côte des Blancs.
