= Villiers-le-Bâcle =

Commune in Île-de-France, France

- Commune
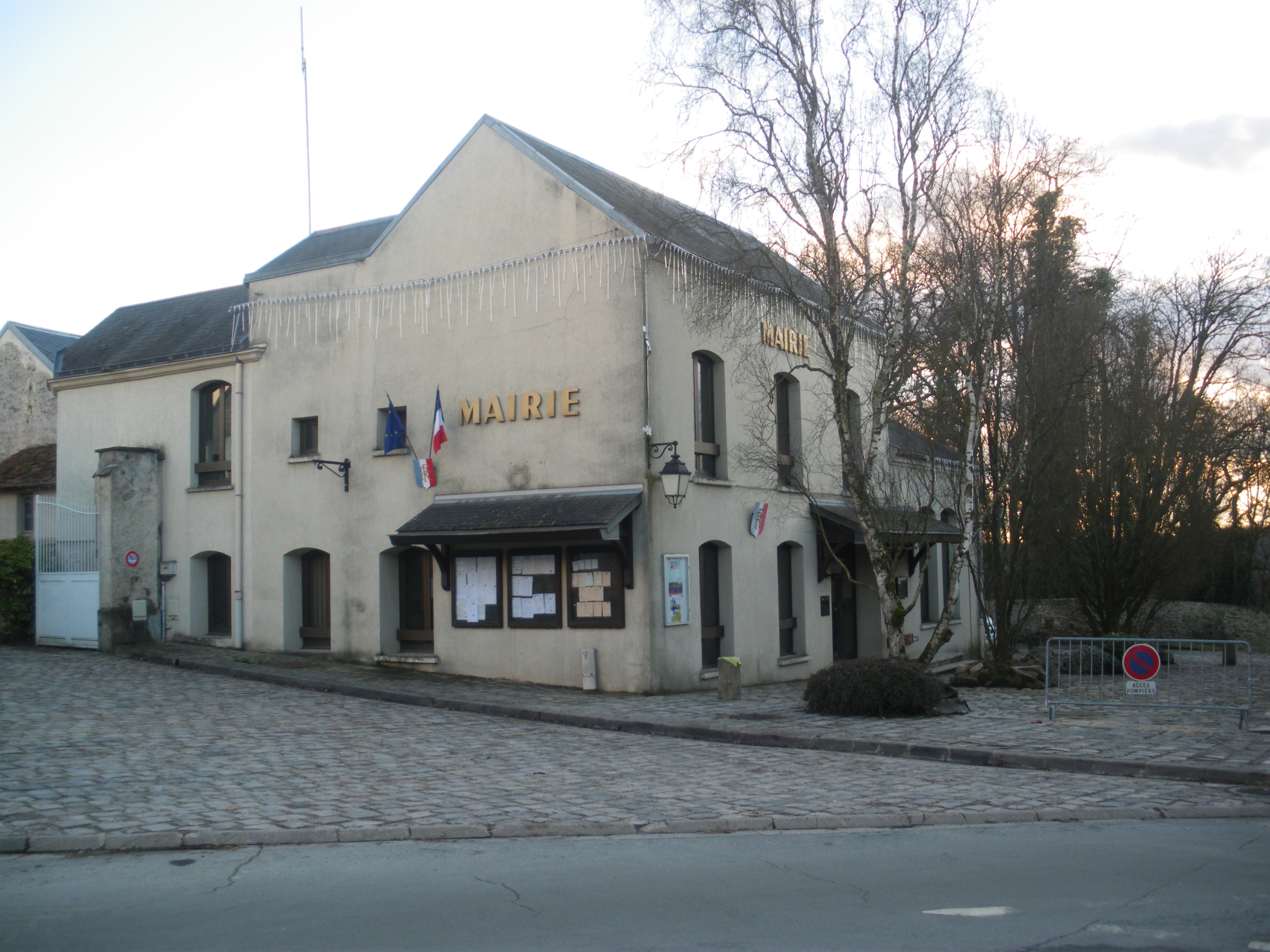
- The town hall in Villiers-le-Bâcle
- Location of Villiers-le-Bâcle
- Location within France Location within Île-de-France (region)
- Coordinates: 48°43′32″N 2°07′32″E
- Country: France
- Region: Île-de-France
- Department: Essonne
- Arrondissement: Palaiseau
- Canton: Gif-sur-Yvette
- Intercommunality: CA Paris-Saclay

Government
  - Mayor (2020–2026): Guillaume Valois
- Area^{1}: 6.03 km^{2} (2.33 sq mi)
- Highest elevation: 161 m (528 ft)
- Lowest elevation: 80 m (260 ft)
- Population (2023): 1,031
  - Density: 171/km^{2} (443/sq mi)
- Time zone: UTC+01:00 (CET)
  - Summer (DST): UTC+02:00 (CEST)
- INSEE/Postal code: 91679 /91190
- ^{1} French Land Register data, which excludes lakes, ponds, glaciers > 1 km^{2} (0.386 sq mi or 247 acres) and river estuaries.

Villiers-le-Bâcle (French pronunciation: [vilje lə bakl]) is a commune in the Essonne department in Île-de-France in northern France.

Inhabitants of Villiers-le-Bâcle are known as Villebaclais.

The painter Tsugouharu Foujita is buried in the commune's cemetery.

== See also ==
- Communes of the Essonne department
