= Woodlands (New Westminster) =

Former asylum (1876–1996)

Woodlands School

Geography
- Location: New Westminster, British Columbia, Canada
- Coordinates: 49°12′49″N 122°53′51″W

Organization
- Type: Specialist

Services
- Speciality: Psychiatry

History
- Opened: 1878
- Closed: 1996

Links
- Lists: Hospitals in Canada

Woodlands or Woodlands School was a hospital in New Westminster, British Columbia, Canada that served as a psychiatric hospital and later as a facility for children with a developmental disorder, as well as runaways and wards of the state. Many incidents of abuse took place there.

== History ==
Woodlands opened in 1878 as the Provincial Lunatic Asylum, which sat on approximately 40 hectares of crown land. By 1886, the resident population had reached 65. By 1896, the patient population had grown to 171. In 1897 the name was changed to The Provincial Hospital for the Insane. In 1950 the name was changed again to Woodlands School. By 1961, the facility had reached its highest resident population of 1,436. Severe overcrowding lead to some patients being transferred elsewhere in the province, such as Tranquille. The asylum continued to decline into the 1970s with many patients being moved to community placements and group homes. Woodlands closed in 1996.

Similar facilities elsewhere in British Columbia included Tranquille Sanatorium in Kamloops, Essondale or Riverview Hospital in Coquitlam, and Valleyview, also in Coquitlam.

== Controversy ==
During its peak, the asylum housed about 1,500 mentally and physically disabled children. Investigations by the Ministry of Children and Family Development found that about 20% of patients at the facility suffered some form of physical, mental, and sexual abuse. In 2002, a class action lawsuit was filed against the hospital. When settled, over 850 former students were eligible for compensation between $3,000 to $150,000 dependent on the level of abuse. Survivors who suffered from abuse before 1974 were excluded from this compensation due to the Crown Proceedings Act. While the case was settled in 2003, payout to the survivors did not occur until 2018.

== Post-Closure ==
After closure in 1996, the asylum sat abandoned. In July 2008, a major fire destroyed a number of buildings, including the second and third floors of the center block. After proposals to preserve Woodlands' Centre Block Tower were opposed by former residents, New Westminster council voted in July 2011 to demolish the tower. In October of 2011, the tower was demolished, with a crowd of about 150 watching. Many of the onlookers were former residents of the school.

The site of the former school was also considered for a station on the Expo Line portion of the SkyTrain system. However, plans to redevelop the site never materialized before the construction of the station, meaning that even though the tracks were built to accommodate the new station, it was never built. The neighborhood has since been renamed Victoria Hill, and is home to 1200 new homes.
