= Nowack =

Nowack is a surname of West Slavic origin, a Germanized spelling variant of Nowak. There are 1936 people in Germany surnamed Nowack. Nowack was attested in 1596 in the locality of Koppatz, Brandenburg.

Notable people with the surname include:

- Alfons Nowack (1868–1940), German historian and archivist
- Butch Nowack (1904–1952), American football player and coach
- Ernst Nowack (1891–1946), Austrian geologist
- Donald Nowack (1924–2008), American politician
- Wilhelm Nowack (1897–1990), German economist, journalist and politician

== Fictional characters ==
- Georg Nowack, a character from the musical She Loves Me inspired by The Shop Around the Corner

== See also ==
- Noack
