= Jacques Selosse =

French winemaker

Coordinates: 48.9714782°N 4.0021715°E

Jacques Selosse is a Champagne producer and grower based in the Avize region of Champagne. The house has been rated as one of Champagne’s top five producers by Andrew Jefford in The New France.

== History ==
The estate was founded by Jacques Selosse and his family in the 1950s, with the first vintage being bottled in 1960. The current proprietor of this estate is Anselme Selosse who took over from his father Jacques in 1980. Anselme studied at the Lycée viticole de Beaune and was one of the first winemakers to apply the winemaking techniques of white Burgundy to Champagne. In 1994 Anselme was named best French Winemaker by Gault Millau.

== Production ==
Jacques Selosse is a grower Champagne, which means the grapes used to produce the wines are grown in vineyards owned by the winery rather than being purchased from other growers, as is the case in most Champagne production. The entire production is grown according to biodynamic principles and Anselme is considered a pioneer of biodynamics in Champagne. Selosse wines are fermented using oak barrels, in contrast to the majority of Champagne producers who use stainless steel tanks.

Two of the wines in Selosse's range, the Substance and the Contraste, are produced using a solera system, the same process used in Sherry production.

Selosse holds 37 acres (15 ha) of vines, predominantly Chardonnay with the remainder Pinot noir. Around 55,000 bottles are produced each vintage, dependent on conditions.

== Partnerships ==
Anselme has partnered with winemaker Riccardo Cotarella on the sparkling wine production at Feudi di San Gregorio in the Southern Italian region of Campania. Rather than the traditional grapes used in Champagne, these wines are made with native Italian grapes such as Greco, Falanghina and Aglianico.

== See also ==
- List of Champagne houses
