= G. H. Mumm =

French champagne

Coordinates: 49.26245°N 4.03831°E

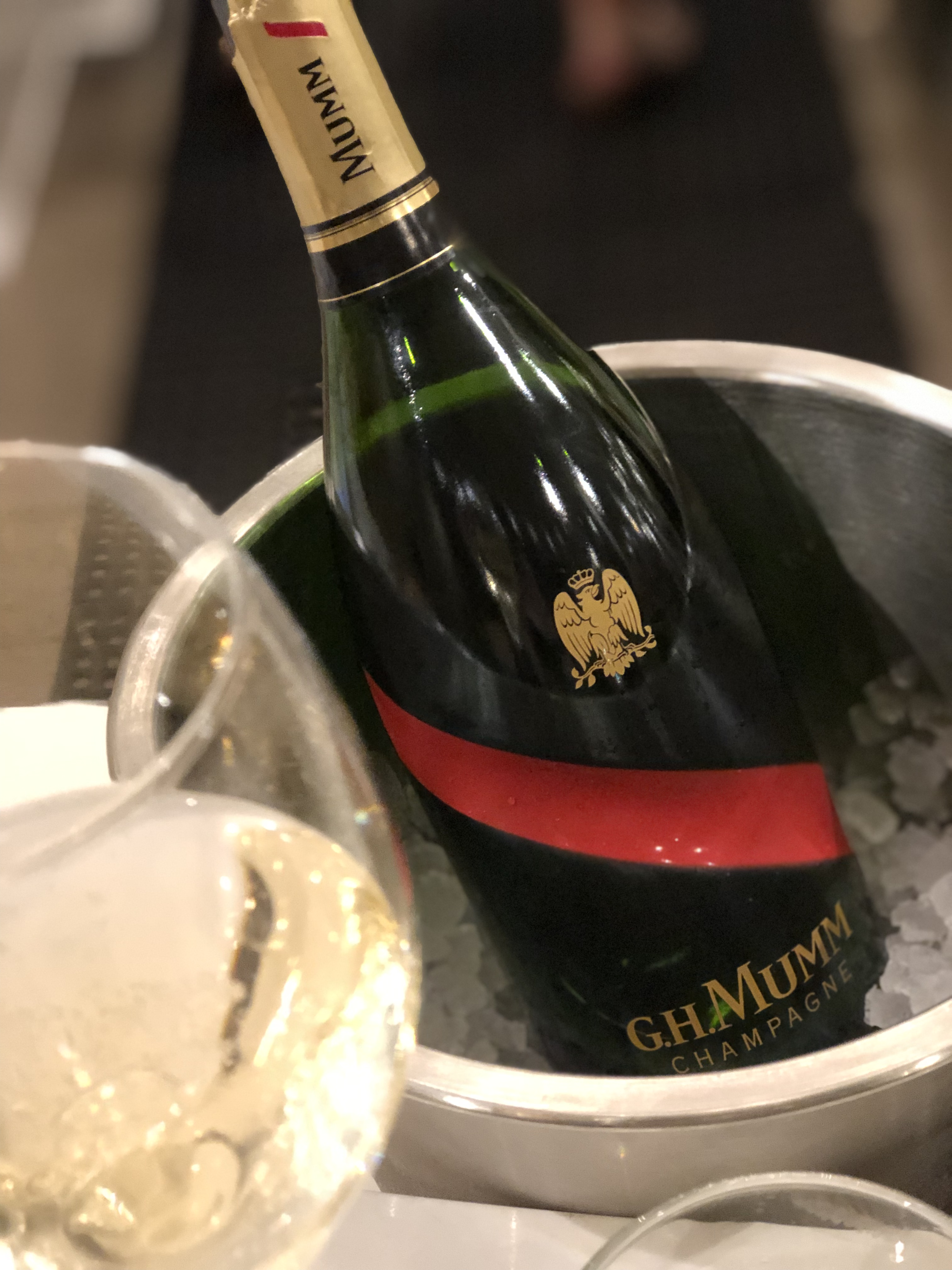
A bottle of G. H. Mumm Champagne

G. H. Mumm & Cie is a Champagne house founded in 1827 and based in Reims, France. G.H. Mumm is one of the largest Champagne houses and is currently ranked 4th globally based on number of bottles sold. The company is owned by Pernod Ricard.

G.H. Mumm was the official sponsor of F1 racing from 2000 until 2015 and provided the champagne bottles for the podium celebrations after each race.

G.H. Mumm Cordon Rouge is also the official champagne of the Kentucky Derby and the Melbourne Cup.

== History ==
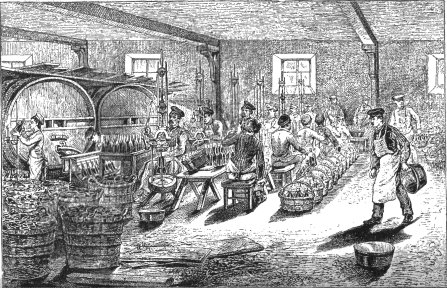
The tirage or bottling of champagne at G. H. Mumm & Co. (1879)

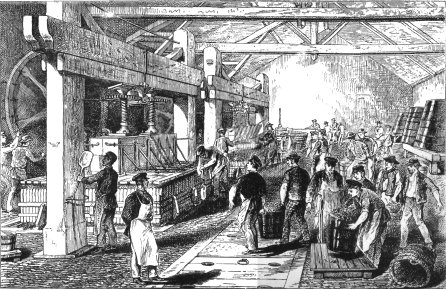
Messrs. G. H. Mumm & Co.'s vendangeoir at Verzenay (1879)

Mumm cellars in Reims

It was founded by three brothers: Jacobus, Gottlieb and Phillip Mumm, German winemakers from the Rhine valley, along with G. Heuser and Friedrich Giesler on March 1, 1827, as P. A. Mumm Giesler et Co. P.A. were the initials of the Mumms' father, Peter Arnold Mumm, a successful wine merchant from Solingen. Mumm's label is famous for its red ribbon (Cordon Rouge), patterned after and resembling the red sash of the Grand Cross (Grand-croix)—formerly called Grand Ribbon (Grand cordon)—the highest level of the French Legion of Honour.

Following the death of Gottlieb Mumm and due to disagreements within the family, the business split into two companies in 1852: G. H. Mumm & Co. (named after Gottlieb Mumm’s son, Georg Hermann) and Jules Mumm & Co. (named after Jacobus Mumm’s son, Julius Engelbert). For his company, Jules Mumm leveraged the recognition of the Legion of Honour’s red ribbon as a distinguishing feature for the Mumm brand; the "Cordon Rouge" brand was born. Nevertheless, the French confiscated all of the Mumms’ properties, although they had lived in Champagne for almost a century before World War I, because they had never become French citizens. The family returned to Germany. In 1920, Société G. H. Mumm was re-established in Reims. Two years later, Godefroy H. Mumm founded the sparkling wine house Mumm & Co. in Frankfurt am Main; from 1933 onwards, it operated under the name G. H. von Mumm & Co. Sektkellerei to distinguish itself from the French company. During the German occupation of France in World War II, the Mumm family briefly took over the management of Société G. H. Mumm, a move that was immediately reversed following the liberation.

In 1970, the German sparkling wine producer G. H. von Mumm & Co. in Frankfurt was separated from the winery of the same name at Johannisberg. The winery was acquired by Rudolf August Oetker in 1957 and continues to be operated by his heirs (Dr. Oetker group) to this day, together with the Schloss Johannisberg wine estate. The sparkling wine producer was acquired by the Canadian Seagram group, just as the Champagne house G. H. Mumm in Reims had been. On January 16, 2002, the G. H. von Mumm & Co. sparkling wine business, including the Matheus Müller sparkling wine factory in Eltville am Rhein, was resold to Rotkäppchen Sektkellerei from Freyburg, former East Germany, which took on the name Rotkäppchen-Mumm. Rotkäppchen itself had been acquired in 1993 through a management buy-out by long-standing employees led by Gunter Heise (42 percent), with liqueur producer Harald Eckes-Chantré (of Eckes-Granini Group) as a partner (58 percent). With a market share of around 36%, Rotkäppchen Sekt is the market leader in the German sparkling wine market.

Seagram sold the champagne brand G. H. Mumm to the French beverage group Pernod Ricard in 2001. This took place in the wake of the breakup and acquisition of the Seagram group by Vivendi and the subsequent sale of its spirits division.

== Sponsorships ==
G.H. Mumm was the official sponsor of F1 racing from 2000 until 2015 and provided the champagne bottles for the podium celebrations after each race. Now, they are the official sponsor of Formula E. G.H. Mumm Cordon Rouge is also the official champagne of the Kentucky Derby and Australia's Melbourne Cup, two major horse races. In October 2016, it was announced that G.H. Mumm would replace J&B after 39 years as the headline sponsor of South Africa's major horse race event, The Sun Met.

In November 2016, G.H. Mumm announced the appointment of eight-time Olympic gold medallist sprinter Usain Bolt as its "CEO" (Chief Entertainment Officer) to feature in a multi-media promotional campaign.

G.H. Mumm also played a central role in Thomas Coville's celebration after achieving his new world record of 49 days and 3 hours for yacht solo-navigation around the world on Christmas Day 2016.

== Mumm Napa ==
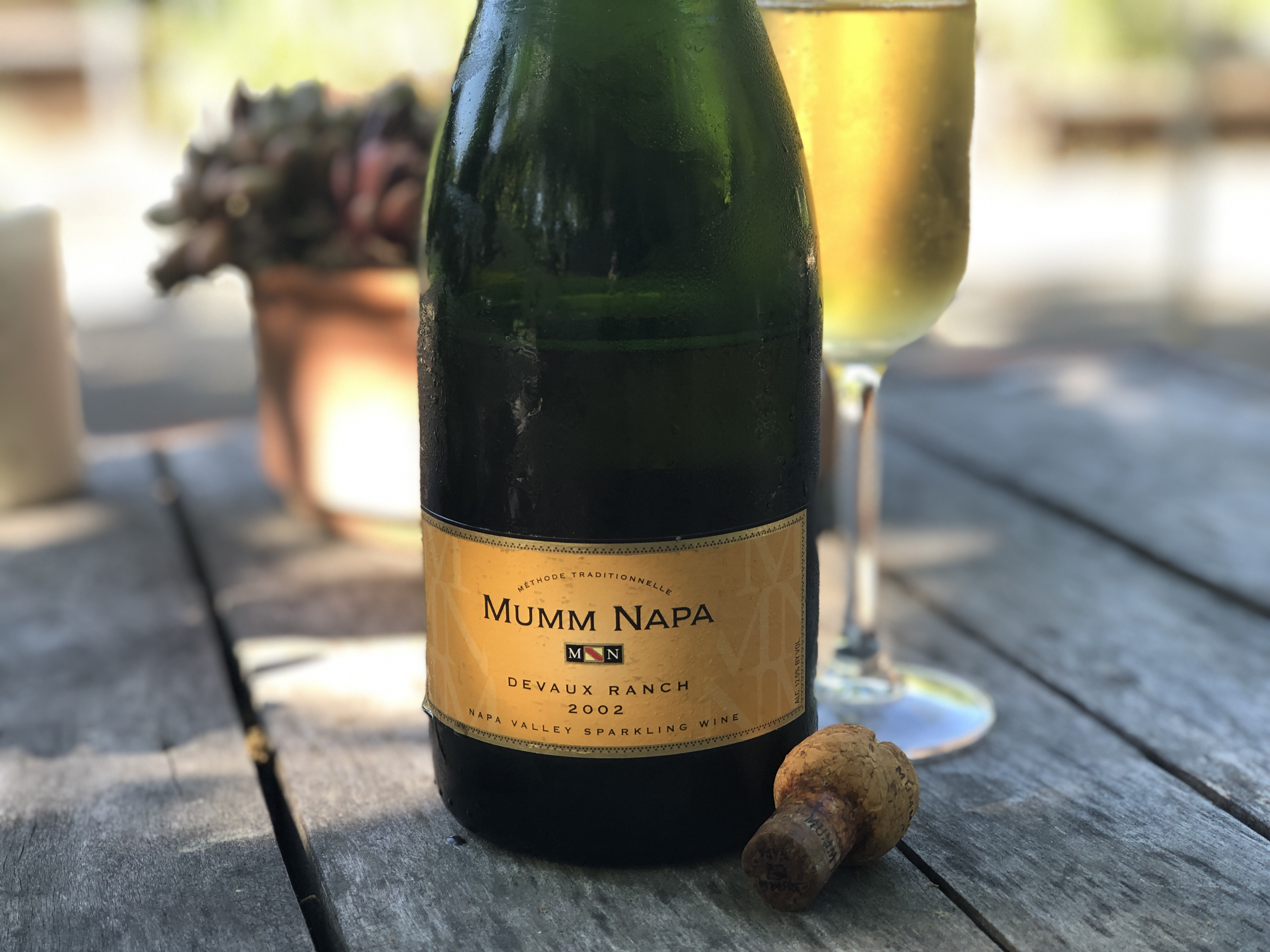
A bottle of Mumm Napa 2002 Devaux Ranch sparkling wine

Mumm Napa is one of California's traditional method sparkling wine producers, a joint venture between the G.H. Mumm & Cie and Joseph E Seagram & Sons. The location in Napa Valley was founded by Guy Deveaux, who determined Napa's long hot days and cold nights to be ideal for producing the right amount of acidity and ripeness.

In December 2025, it was announced that Mumm Napa would be acquired by Trinchero Family Wine & Spirits as part of a transaction with Pernod Ricard covering its US sparkling wine assets. The deal included the Mumm Napa winery and production facilities in Rutherford, California, and transferred US manufacturing and regional distribution rights, while excluding Champagne and non-US Mumm operations.

== Foujita chapel ==
In 1964, René Lalou, the head of the Mumm Champagne House, and Léonard Foujita (1886–1968), a Japanese painter belonging to the École de Paris school of art, decided to build a chapel in the gardens belonging to the Champagne house. Begun in 1965, the Foujita chapel was entirely designed by Foujita in the romanesque style, who drew the plans and designed the ironwork, stained glass and sculptures. He supervised the building and interior decoration. The chapel is decorated with frescos inspired by oriental art. The chapel was consecrated on 1 October 1966 and handed over to the City of Reims on 18 October 1966. The chapel was designated an historic monument in 1992.

Foujita also gave G.H. Mumm a fresco depicting The Virgin in the Vines. The rose featured in the painting became the cuvée's emblem and appears on the metallic cap on top of the cork of the rose Champagne.

== See also ==
- Walther von Mumm
- List of Champagne houses
