= Pierre Gimonnet & Fils =

Pierre Gimonnet & Fils is a producer of grower champagne and an original member of the Club Trésors de Champagne. The domaine has 28 hectares based in the Côte des Blancs with premiers crus sites in Cuis and Mareuil-sur Aÿ, and grands crus in Cramant, Chouilly, Oger, Vertus, and Aÿ; the fields are planted to 98% chardonnay and 2% pinot noir. The house produces 20,000 cases annually. The house is noted for old vines, with 70% over 30 years old, and even century-old vines in the grands crus lieux-dits of Le Fond du Bateau (planted in 1911) and Buisson (planted in 1913). Three generations of the family have produced champagne; today, the estate is managed by Didier and Olivier Gimonnet.
