= Club Trésors de Champagne =

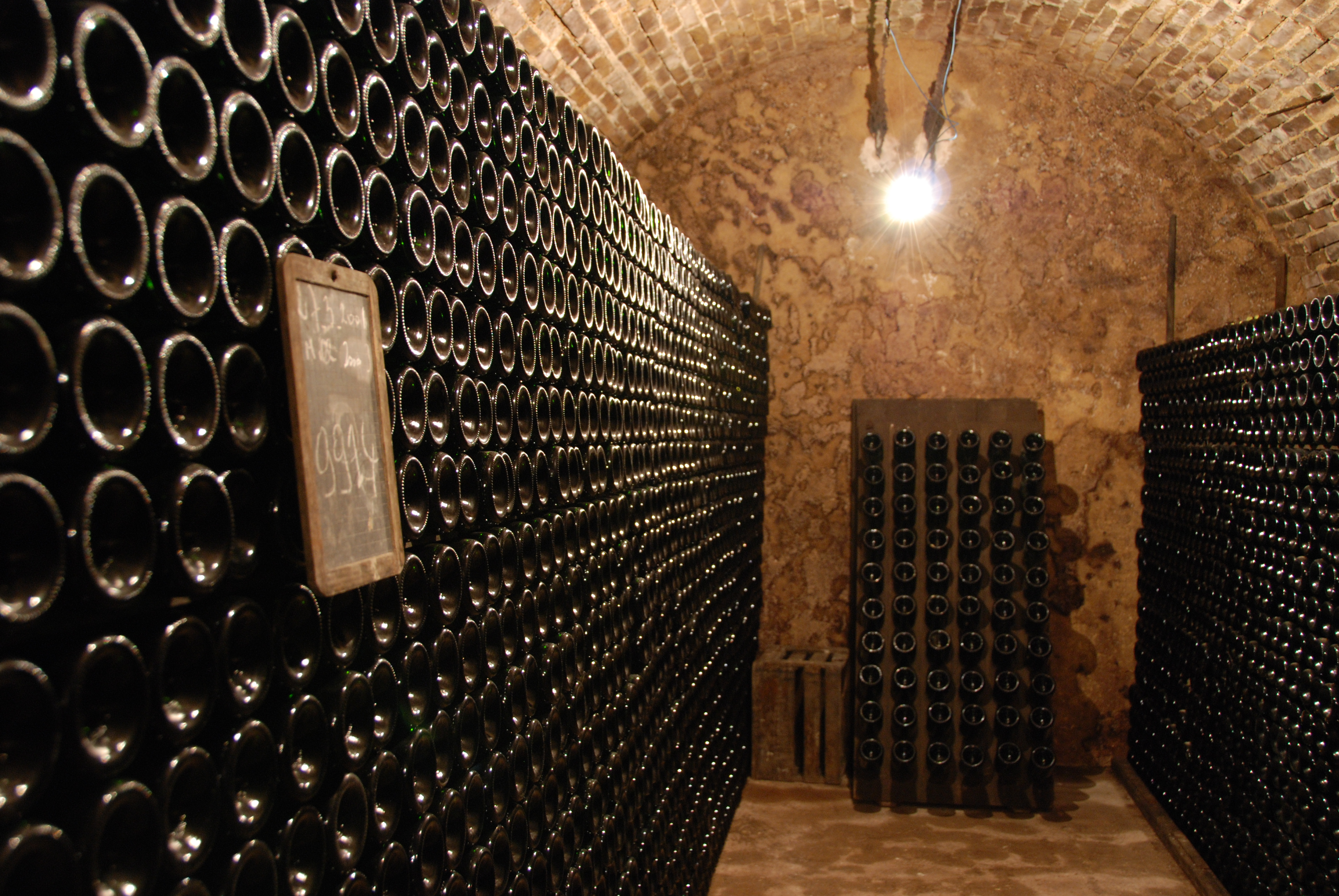
Champagne Dumenil in Chigny-les-Roses

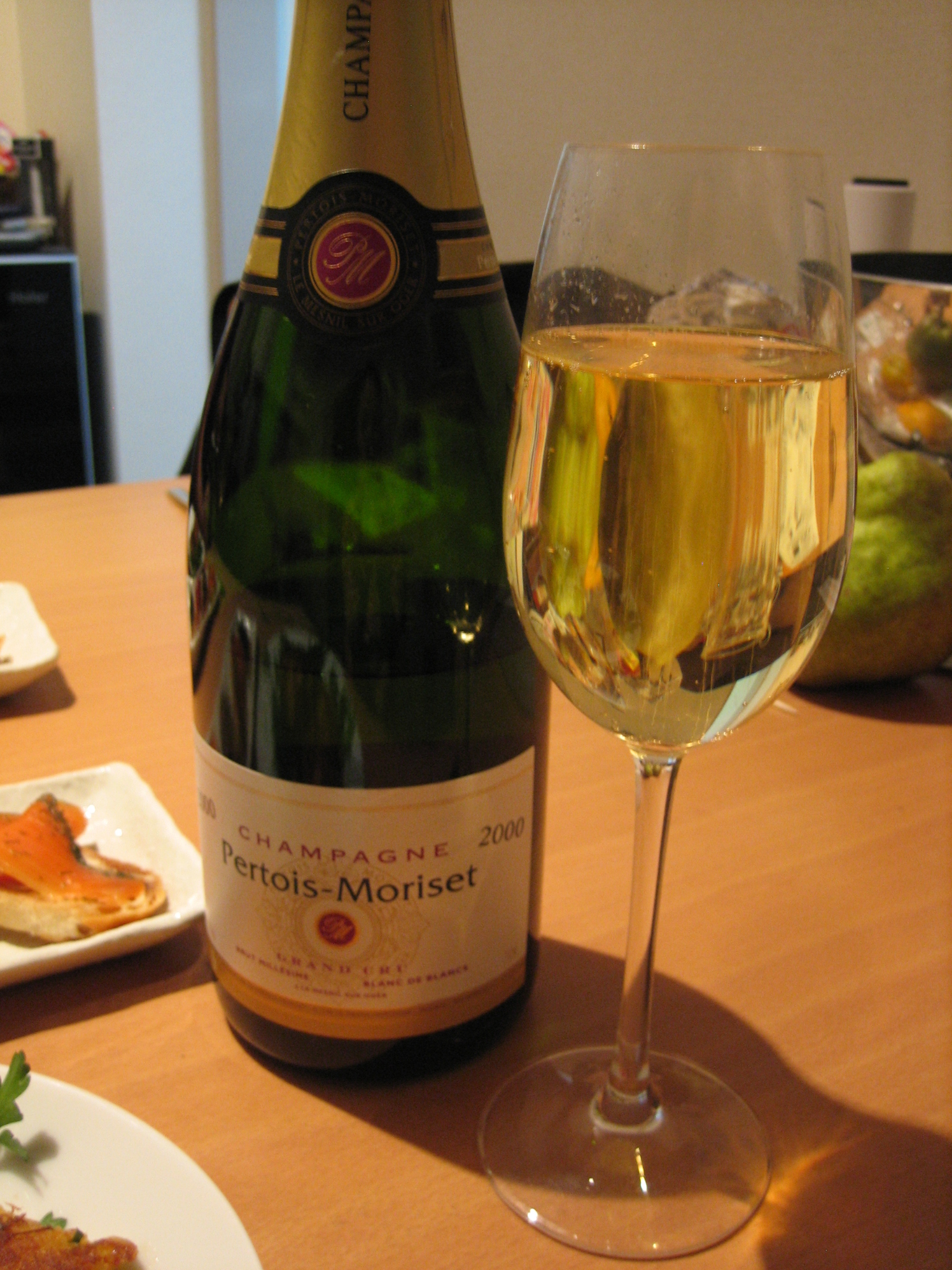
A bottle of Champagne Pertois-Moriset

Club Trésors de Champagne (also Special Club) is a French wine industry trade group founded in 1971. It began with 12 of the oldest families of the Champagne wine region, and its membership has expanded to include 25 producers of grower champagnes. The Special Club designated champagnes are the tête de cuvée of each producer. The original group of twelve growers first called it Club de Viticultures Champenois, and in 1999 changed their name to Club Trésors de Champagne. Special Club champagnes must be produced, bottled and aged at the member's estate, including a minimum of three years aging on lees. The purpose of the club is to highlight the unique terroir of each family holding. Current members who were part of the founding of the group include Pierre Gimonnet, Gaston Chiquet and Paul Bara. In 2003, the vintage was deemed unbalanced, and so the club decided not to produce any Special Club wines that year.

== Current members ==
24 members present in the 4 wine-growing regions of the Champagne appellation.

- Champagne Paul Bara, Bouzy
- Champagne Roland Champion, Chouilly
- Champagne Charlier & Fils, Montigny Sous Chatillon
- Champagne Gaston Chiquet, Dizy
- Champagne Dumenil, Sacy
- Champagne Forget-Chemin, Ludes-Le-Coquet
- Champagne Fresnet-Juillet, Verzy
- Champagne Pierre Gimonnet et Fils, Cuis
- Champagne Henri Goutorbe, Aÿ
- Champagne Grongnet, Etoges
- Champagne Marc Hebrart, Mareuil-Sur-Aÿ
- Champagne Hervieux-Dumez, Sacy
- Champagne Vincent Joudart, Fèrebrianges
- Champagne Juillet-Lallement, Verzy
- Champagne J. Lassalle, Chigny-les-Roses
- Champagne Pertois-Moriset, Le Mesnil-sur-Oger
- Champagne Loriot-Pagel, Festigny
- Champagne A. Margaine, Villers-Marmery
- Champagne Rémy Massin et Fils, Ville-sur-Arce
- Champagne José Michel, Moussy
- Champagne Nomine-Renard, Villevenard
- Champagne Salmon, Chaumuzy
- Champagne Sanchez Le Guedard, Cumières
- Champagne Vazart-Coquart et Fils, Chouilly
- Champagne Morel, Riceys
