= Côte des Blancs =

Area of champagne vineyards in France

Coordinates: 48.96°N 4.02°E

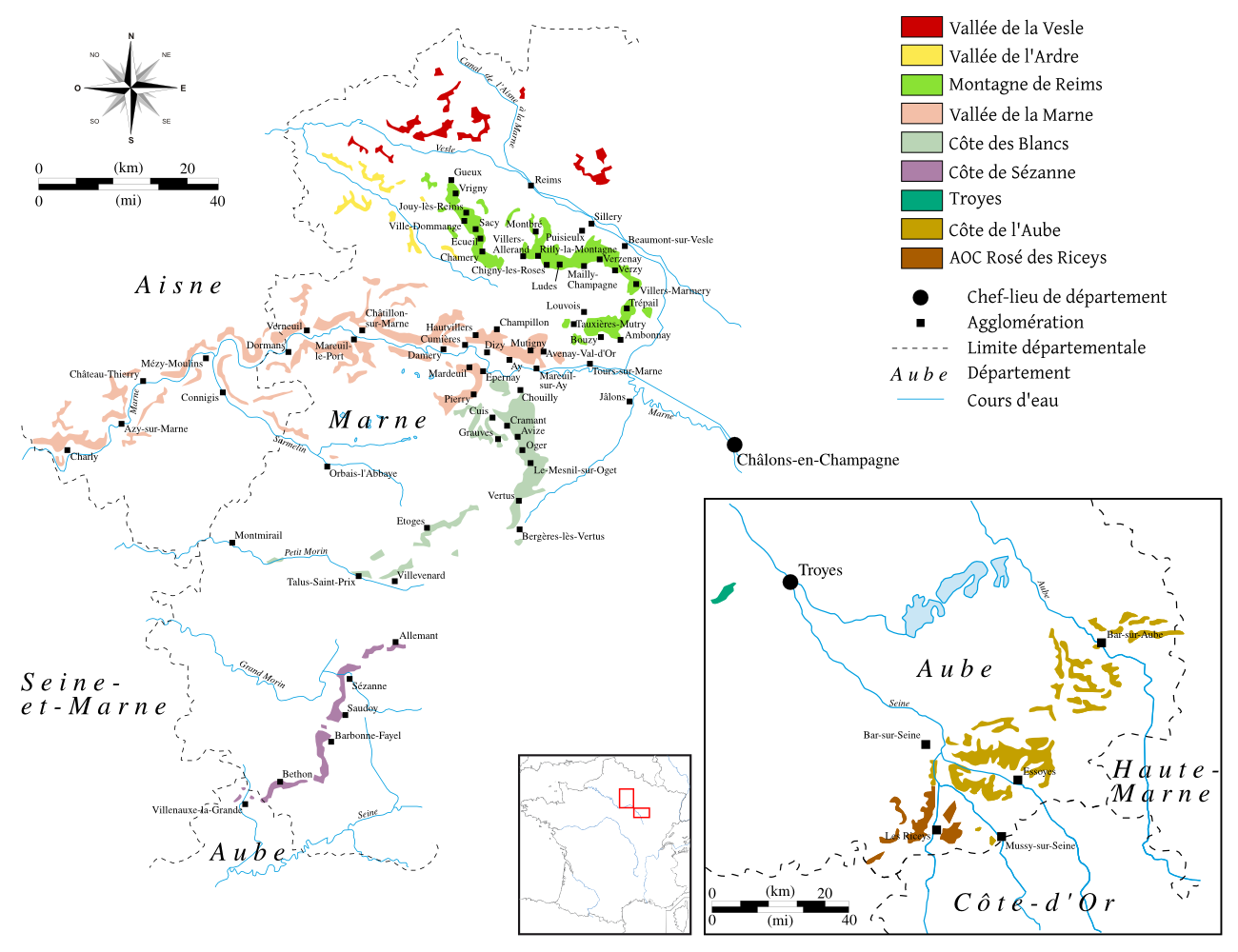
Map of the Champagne wine region.

The Côte des Blancs is an area of Champagne vineyards. Located in the department of Marne, it lies south of Epernay, stretches for about 20 km, and had a vineyard area of 3,313 hectares (8,190 acres) in 2006. The Côte des Blancs is a mostly eastern-facing slope that owes its name to the color of the grape that is planted: 95% Chardonnay. Champagnes in this area include the term "blanc de blancs".

Only four villages are located on the actual Côtes des Blancs slope, namely Avize, Cramant, Le Mesnil-sur-Oger and Oger but all municipalities between Cuis and Bergères-les-Vertus have their vineyards on the côtes. The Côte des Blancs has a high-quality reputation and yields popular champagnes, which are known for light and delicate aromas, finesse and elegance. The Côtes des Blancs is the source of Chardonnay for many vintage Champagnes and prestige cuvées from the large Champagne houses.

== Classification ==
Côte des Blancs includes six villages classified as grand cru.

- Avize
- Chouilly
- Cramant
- Le Mesnil-sur-Oger
- Oger
- Oiry
