= Épernay =

- Subprefecture and commune
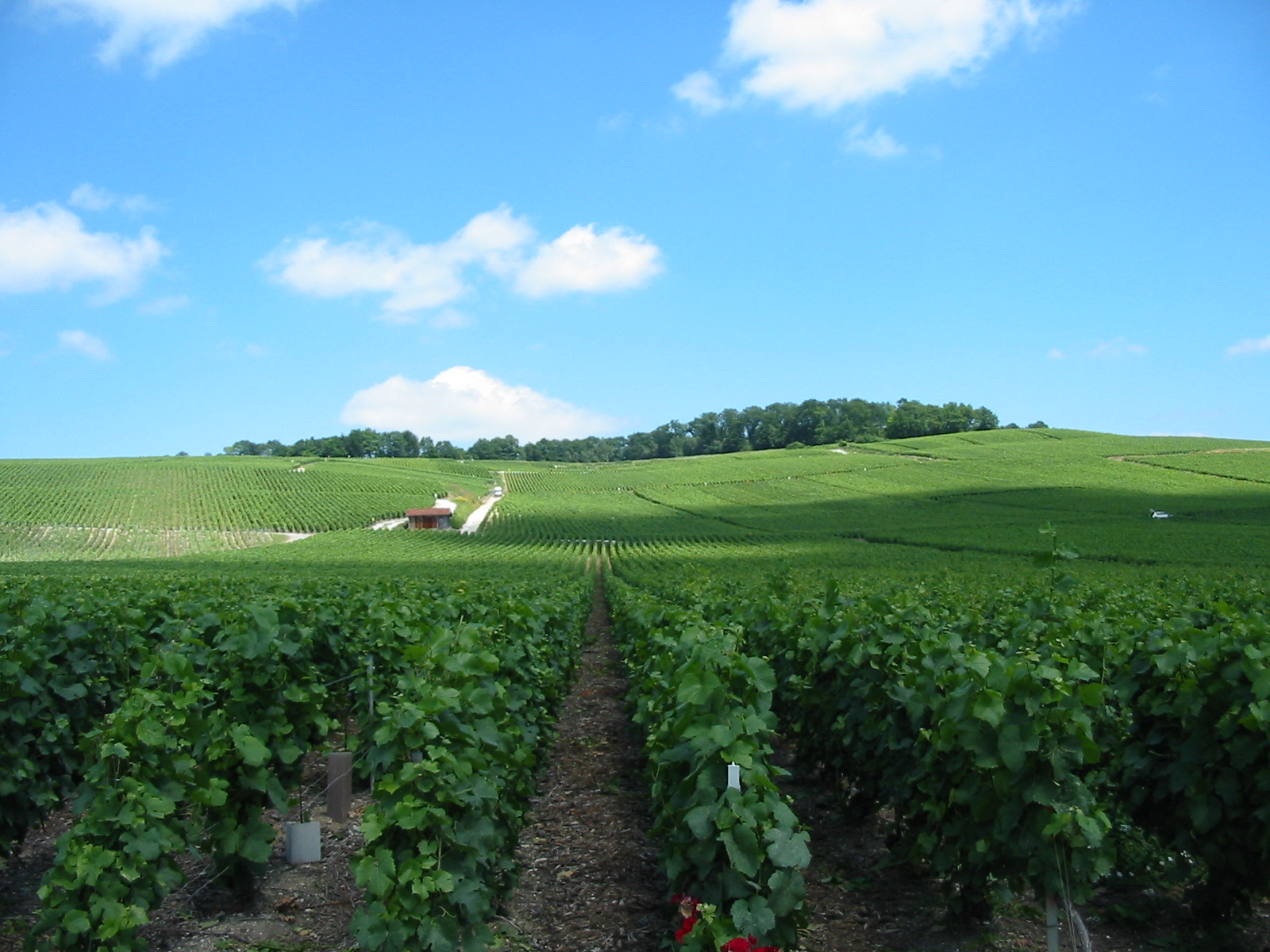
- Vineyards near Épernay

- Coat of arms
- Location of Épernay
- Location within France Location within Grand Est
- Coordinates: 49°02′25″N 3°57′36″E
- Country: France
- Region: Grand Est
- Department: Marne
- Arrondissement: Épernay
- Canton: Épernay-1 and 2
- Intercommunality: CA Épernay, Coteaux et Plaine de Champagne

Government
  - Mayor (2023–2026): Christine Mazy
- Area^{1}: 22.69 km^{2} (8.76 sq mi)
- Population (2023): 22,174
  - Density: 977.3/km^{2} (2,531/sq mi)
- Time zone: UTC+01:00 (CET)
  - Summer (DST): UTC+02:00 (CEST)
- INSEE/Postal code: 51230 /51200
- ^{1} French Land Register data, which excludes lakes, ponds, glaciers > 1 km^{2} (0.386 sq mi or 247 acres) and river estuaries.

Épernay (French pronunciation: [epɛʁnɛ]) is a commune in the Marne department of northern France, 130 km (80 miles) north-east of Paris on the mainline railway to Strasbourg. The town sits on the left bank of the Marne at the extremity of the Cubry valley which crosses it.

Épernay is a sub-prefecture of the department and seat of an arrondissement.

== History ==
Épernay (Sparnacum) belonged to the archbishops of Reims from the 5th until the 10th century, when it came into the possession of the counts of Champagne. It was badly damaged during the Hundred Years' War, and was burned by Francis I in 1544. It resisted Henry of Navarre in 1592, and Marshal Biron fell in the attack which preceded its eventual capture. In 1642 it was, along with Château-Thierry, named as a duchy and assigned to the duc de Bouillon.

=== French Revolution and Empire ===
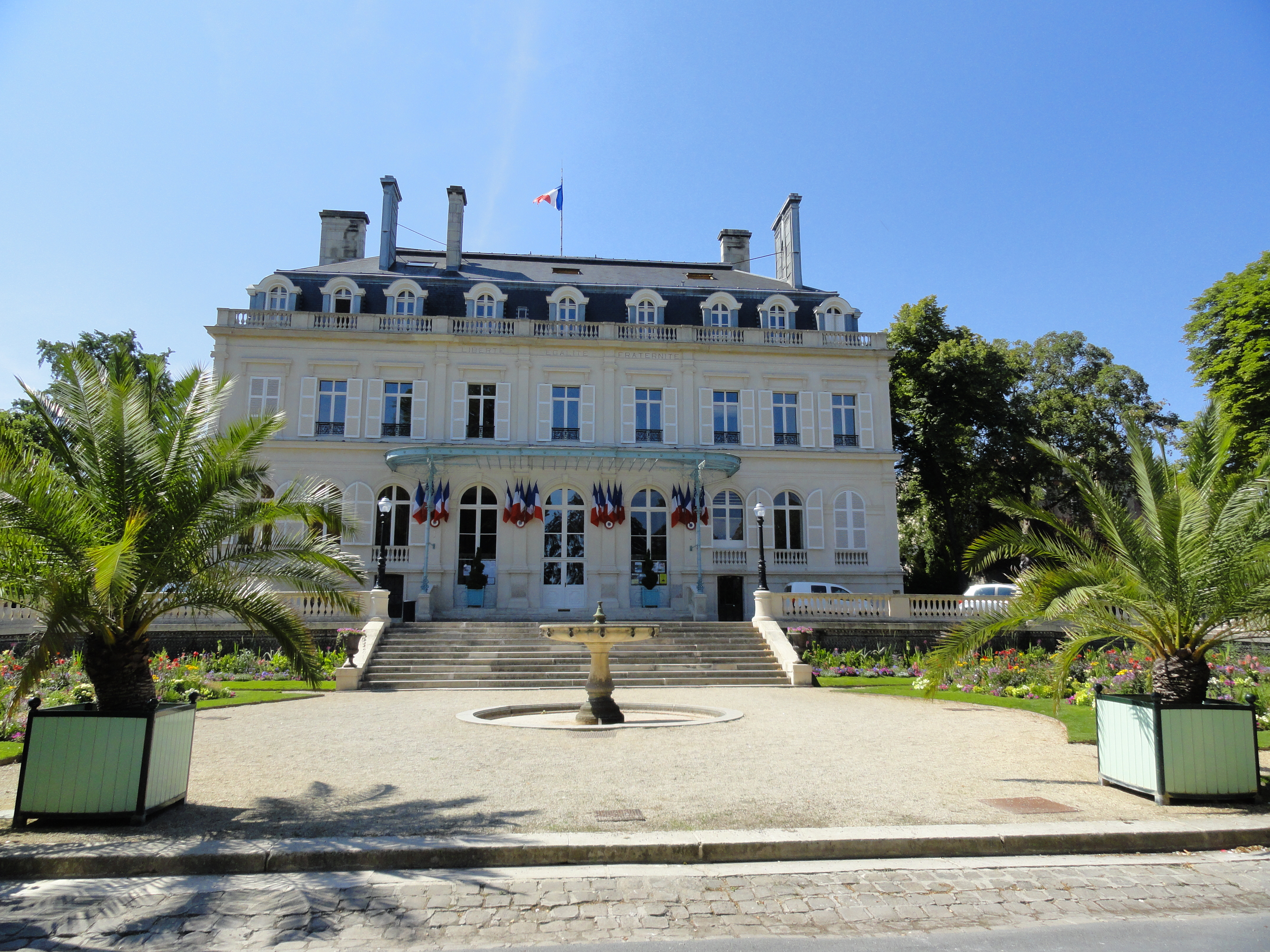
The Hôtel de Ville

During the French Revolution, Epernay became the capital of the canton and district of Épernay. In 1800, it became the subprefecture of the arrondissement of Épernay.

After the fall of the Empire, Épernay entered a period of calm, which allowed it to focus on its organization (in 1837, the town's streets were named and its houses numbered) and its facilities. On 26 December 1846, gas street lighting was installed. The Hôtel de Ville was built as a private residence and completed in 1858.

The Meaux-Épernay section of the Paris-Strasbourg railway line was inaugurated on 2 September 1849, by Prince-President Louis-Napoléon Bonaparte.

=== Contemporary period ===
With the Franco-Prussian War 1870/71, the territory was occupied by Prussians troops on 8 September and numerous restrictions were put in place, such as the ban on hunting. The railway line between Épernay and Romilly-sur-Seine was inaugurated. 1 November 1872 marked the end of the occupation.

Then the town grew. In 1900, the first power station was built, modernised in 1912 to supply alternating current. By 1934, it was no longer able to meet demand.

On 27 July 1903, the town was connected to Montmirail by the C.B.R. railway, then to Ambonnay on 8 April 1904, enabling travel to Reims or Châlons.

During the First World War, two-thirds of the town was destroyed. During the retreat from the Marne, from 4 to 11 September 1914, it was occupied by the German army, which blew up the Marne bridge during its retreat[73].

It subsequently became a rear-front town, as the front stabilised from late 1914 to May 1918 around Reims, 35 km to the north. As such, it was a transit point for the large numbers of troops stationed there, and Épernay became an important hospital centre. Its proximity to the front line meant that it was bombed many times, especially from 1917 onwards, and there were fears that it would fall into enemy hands during the German offensive in May 1918 (Operation Michael).

== Population ==
Historical population

Year	Pop.	±% p.a.
1793	3,736	—
1800	4,480	+2.63%
1806	4,544	+0.24%
1821	4,977	+0.61%
1831	5,318	+0.66%
1836	5,457	+0.52%
1841	5,978	+1.84%
1846	6,095	+0.39%
1851	7,386	+3.92%
1856	9,346	+4.82%
1861	10,598	+2.55%
1866	11,704	+2.01%
1872	12,927	+1.67%
1876	15,506	+4.65%
1881	16,388	+1.11%
1886	17,907	+1.79%
1891	18,361	+0.50%
1896	19,377	+1.08%
1901	20,478	+1.11%

Year	Pop.	±% p.a.
1906	21,637	+1.11%
1911	21,811	+0.16%
1921	21,806	−0.00%
1926	20,589	−1.14%
1931	20,381	−0.20%
1936	20,406	+0.02%
1946	19,703	−0.35%
1954	21,222	+0.93%
1962	21,882	+0.38%
1968	26,583	+3.30%
1975	29,677	+1.59%
1982	27,668	−1.00%
1990	26,682	−0.45%
1999	25,844	−0.35%
2007	24,591	−0.62%
2012	23,529	−0.88%
2017	22,671	−0.74%
2023	22,174	−0.37%

Source: EHESS and INSEE (1968-2023)

== Main sights ==
In the central and oldest quarter of the town, the streets are narrow and irregular; the surrounding suburbs, however, are modern and more spacious, with La Folie to the East, for example, containing many villas belonging to rich wine merchants. The town has also spread to the right bank of the Marne.

One of its churches retains a portal and stained-glass windows from the 16th century, but the other public buildings are of modern construction. The most famous street in Épernay is the Avenue de Champagne which features the leading Champagne manufacturers.

Other sights outside the town include:

- Château de Pierry
- Château de Montmort
- Château de Condé

== Economy ==
Épernay is best known as the principal "entrepôt" for champagne wines, which are bottled and kept in large cellars built into the chalk rock on which the town is built. The major grape varieties used in champagne are the pinot noir, the pinot meunier and the chardonnay. The production of the equipment and raw materials used in the champagne industry is a major source of local employment. Champagne Pannier, among others, was established in Épernay before moving to Château-Thierry in 1937. Brewing and sugar refinery and the production of hats and caps, are also major industries.

Épernay station has rail connections to Paris, Strasbourg, Reims, Metz, Nancy and several regional destinations.

The nearest airport is Paris's Charles de Gaulle Airport, which is located 132 km (82 mi) west of Épernay.

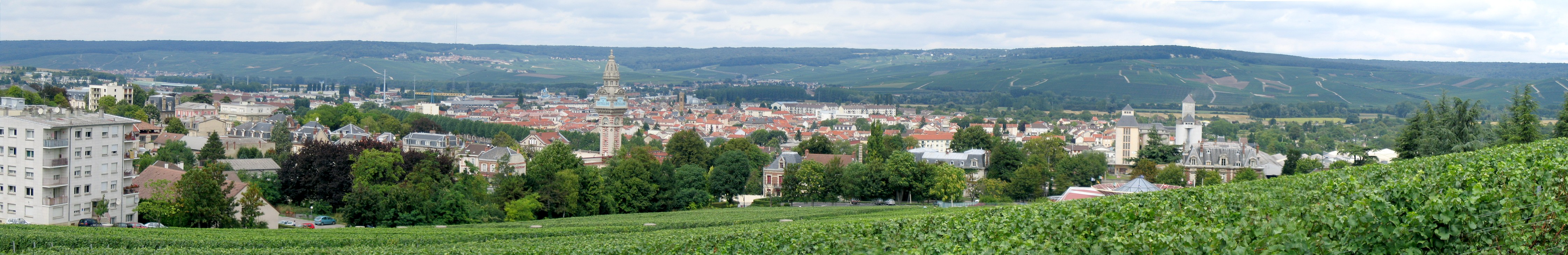
Mercier Champagne vineyards in Épernay

== Notable people ==
Épernay was the birthplace of:

- Flodoard (894–966), chronicler
- Jean-Baptiste-Maximien Parchappe de Vinay (1800–1866), psychiatrist
- Henri-Gustave Joly de Lotbinière (1829–1908), Québécois politician
- Léon Homo (1872–1957), historian
- Gabrielle Dorziat (1880–1979), actress
- Albert Louis Deullin (1890-1923), World War 1 flying ace
- Yohann Diniz (born 1978), athlete
- John Gadret (born 1979), cyclist
- Maakan Tounkara (born 1983), handball player
- Alex Vanopslagh (born 1991), Danish politician

Épernay is the final resting place of:

- Léon Azéma (1888–1978), French architect, died in Épernay and is buried in the cemetery there.
- Yvette Lundy (1916–2019), member of the French Resistance.

== Twin towns – sister cities ==
Épernay is twinned with:

- Ettlingen, Germany
- Clevedon, England, United Kingdom
- Fada N'gourma, Burkina Faso
- Middelkerke, Belgium
- Montespertoli, Italy

== Climate ==
Climate data for Épernay (Chouilly) (2004–2020 normals, extremes 2004–present)
Month	Jan	Feb	Mar	Apr	May	Jun	Jul	Aug	Sep	Oct	Nov	Dec	Year
Record high °C (°F)	14.6 (58.3)	21.1 (70.0)	24.7 (76.5)	27.6 (81.7)	31.6 (88.9)	36.1 (97.0)	40.3 (104.5)	37.5 (99.5)	33.5 (92.3)	27.0 (80.6)	21.7 (71.1)	17.0 (62.6)	40.3 (104.5)
Mean daily maximum °C (°F)	5.9 (42.6)	7.1 (44.8)	11.2 (52.2)	16.3 (61.3)	19.2 (66.6)	22.9 (73.2)	25.5 (77.9)	24.6 (76.3)	21.2 (70.2)	16.1 (61.0)	9.9 (49.8)	6.4 (43.5)	15.5 (59.9)
Daily mean °C (°F)	3.4 (38.1)	4.1 (39.4)	7.2 (45.0)	11.3 (52.3)	14.2 (57.6)	17.8 (64.0)	20.0 (68.0)	19.2 (66.6)	16.2 (61.2)	12.2 (54.0)	7.2 (45.0)	4.0 (39.2)	11.4 (52.5)
Mean daily minimum °C (°F)	1.0 (33.8)	1.1 (34.0)	3.2 (37.8)	6.3 (43.3)	9.3 (48.7)	12.7 (54.9)	14.5 (58.1)	13.8 (56.8)	11.2 (52.2)	8.4 (47.1)	4.4 (39.9)	1.6 (34.9)	7.3 (45.1)
Record low °C (°F)	−11.1 (12.0)	−12.3 (9.9)	−10.3 (13.5)	−3.0 (26.6)	0.8 (33.4)	4.9 (40.8)	7.9 (46.2)	6.6 (43.9)	3.7 (38.7)	−3.2 (26.2)	−4.7 (23.5)	−10.9 (12.4)	−12.3 (9.9)
Average precipitation mm (inches)	57.9 (2.28)	57.2 (2.25)	49.5 (1.95)	37.4 (1.47)	62.7 (2.47)	59.8 (2.35)	55.9 (2.20)	55.8 (2.20)	41.1 (1.62)	55.4 (2.18)	54.7 (2.15)	81.5 (3.21)	668.9 (26.33)
Average precipitation days (≥ 1.0 mm)	11.3	11.6	10.6	7.6	9.8	8.8	8.2	8.7	6.7	9.6	10.2	13.1	116.1
Source: Meteociel

== See also ==
- French wine
- Champagne Riots
