= RAMUF (graffiti artist) =

French graffiti artist

FUMAR on Paris Street

Fumar is a French graffiti artist and draughtsman associated with the Paris and Île-de-France graffiti scene. His work is centred on graffiti writing, lettering and mural painting in public space. The French graffiti archive Maquis-Art lists Fumar as an artist from the Île-de-France region.

== Graffiti practice ==
Fumar's work is primarily based on lettering and the graffiti tradition of writing. His murals combine constructed letterforms with figurative elements, characters and graphic compositions.

His graffiti work has been documented in the Île-de-France region by the French urban-art archive Maquis-Art.

== Public and collaborative projects ==
=== Champagne Pannier ===
In 2024, Fumar participated in the production of a large-scale mural commissioned for Champagne Pannier in Château-Thierry. The mural was designed by the French artist Romano and drew on characters from the fables of Jean de La Fontaine and the heritage of the Champagne house. Street-Heart identifies Fumar and Léo Rocchi as the two artists who assisted Romano in the production of the mural.

=== Caricartoons ===
In 2025, the Caricartoons campaign, organised by Européens Sans Frontières, Cartooning for Peace and Reporters Without Borders, combined press cartoons, animation, public debate and street art around the theme of freedom of the press.

The Paris programme included the creation of a monumental street-art mural in May 2025.

Reporters Without Borders also covered the Caricartoons campaign as part of its activities for World Press Freedom Day.

=== The Enchanted Forest ===
<ref>In 2026, Fumar took part in the production and installation of The Enchanted Forest (La Forêt enchantée), an immersive installation presented beneath the historic market halls of Questembert.

The project marked an extension of his practice from mural painting towards installation and work within an architectural environment.

=== Le Mouvement ===
Fumar later joined the French urban-art collective Le Mouvement.

== Style ==
Fumar's practice retains a close connection to traditional graffiti writing and public-space painting. Letterforms remain a central element of his work, alongside figurative characters and narrative compositions.

His murals commonly use large-scale constructed lettering, outlines, dimensional effects and graphic backgrounds. His practice frequently involves collaborative painting and temporary interventions in urban environments.

Fumar Artwork in Paris

Fumar working in Paris Street

Fumar on scale working
