= Morangis =

Morangis may refer to the following communes in France:

- Morangis, Essonne
- Morangis, Marne
