= Grauves =

- Commune
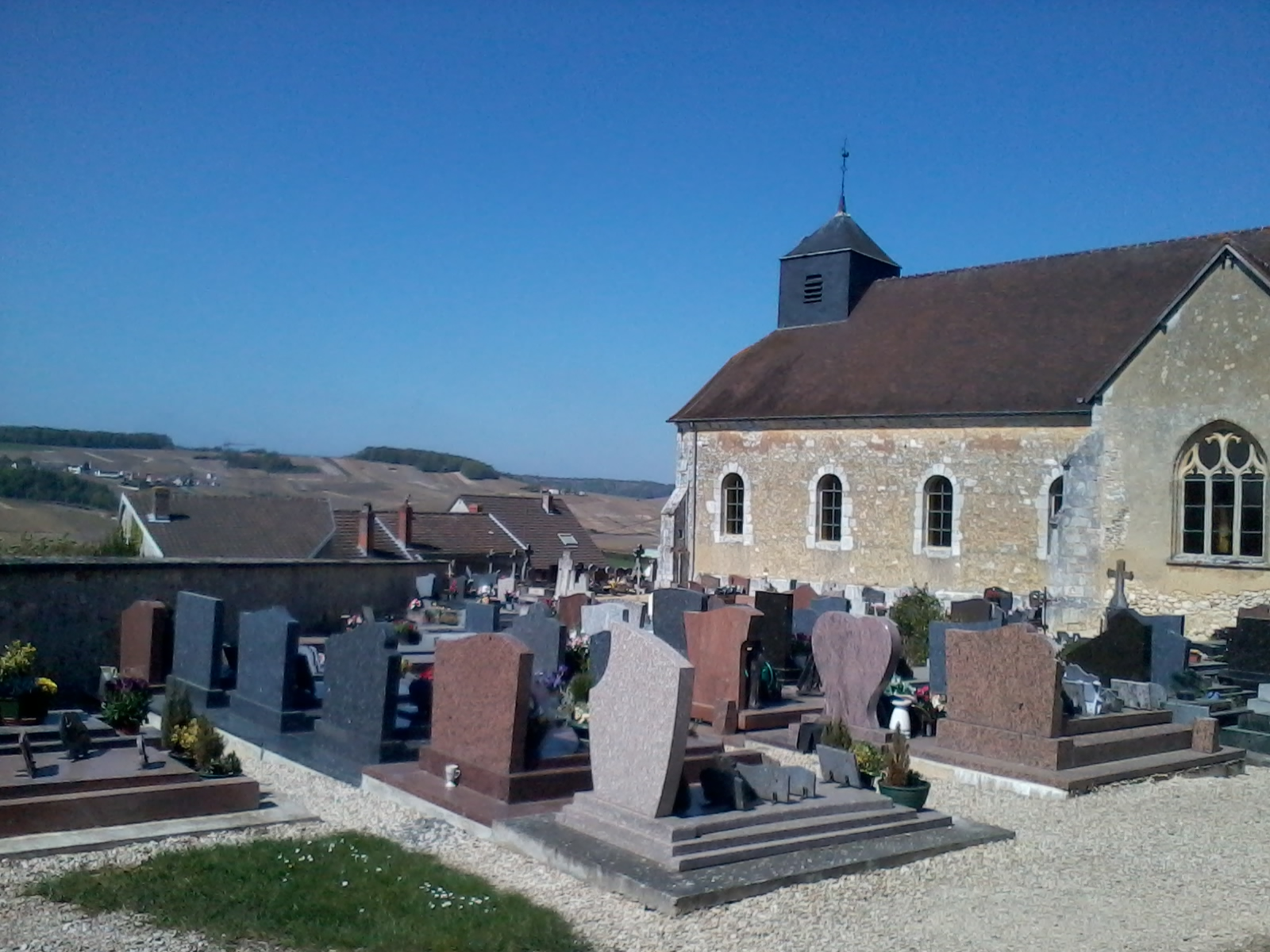
- The commune's cemetery overlooking the village and its surrounding fields
- Location of Grauves
- Location within France Location within Grand Est
- Coordinates: 48°58′28″N 3°57′56″E
- Country: France
- Region: Grand Est
- Department: Marne
- Arrondissement: Épernay
- Canton: Épernay-2
- Intercommunality: CA Épernay, Coteaux et Plaine de Champagne

Government
  - Mayor (2020–2026): Jean-Pierre Journé
- Area^{1}: 7.84 km^{2} (3.03 sq mi)
- Elevation: 127 m (417 ft)
- Population (2023): 618
  - Density: 78.8/km^{2} (204/sq mi)
- Time zone: UTC+01:00 (CET)
  - Summer (DST): UTC+02:00 (CEST)
- INSEE/Postal code: 51281 /51190
- ^{1} French Land Register data, which excludes lakes, ponds, glaciers > 1 km^{2} (0.386 sq mi or 247 acres) and river estuaries.

Grauves (French pronunciation: [ɡʁov]) is a commune in the Marne department in north-eastern France.

== See also ==
- Communes of the Marne department
