= Chavot-Courcourt =

- Commune
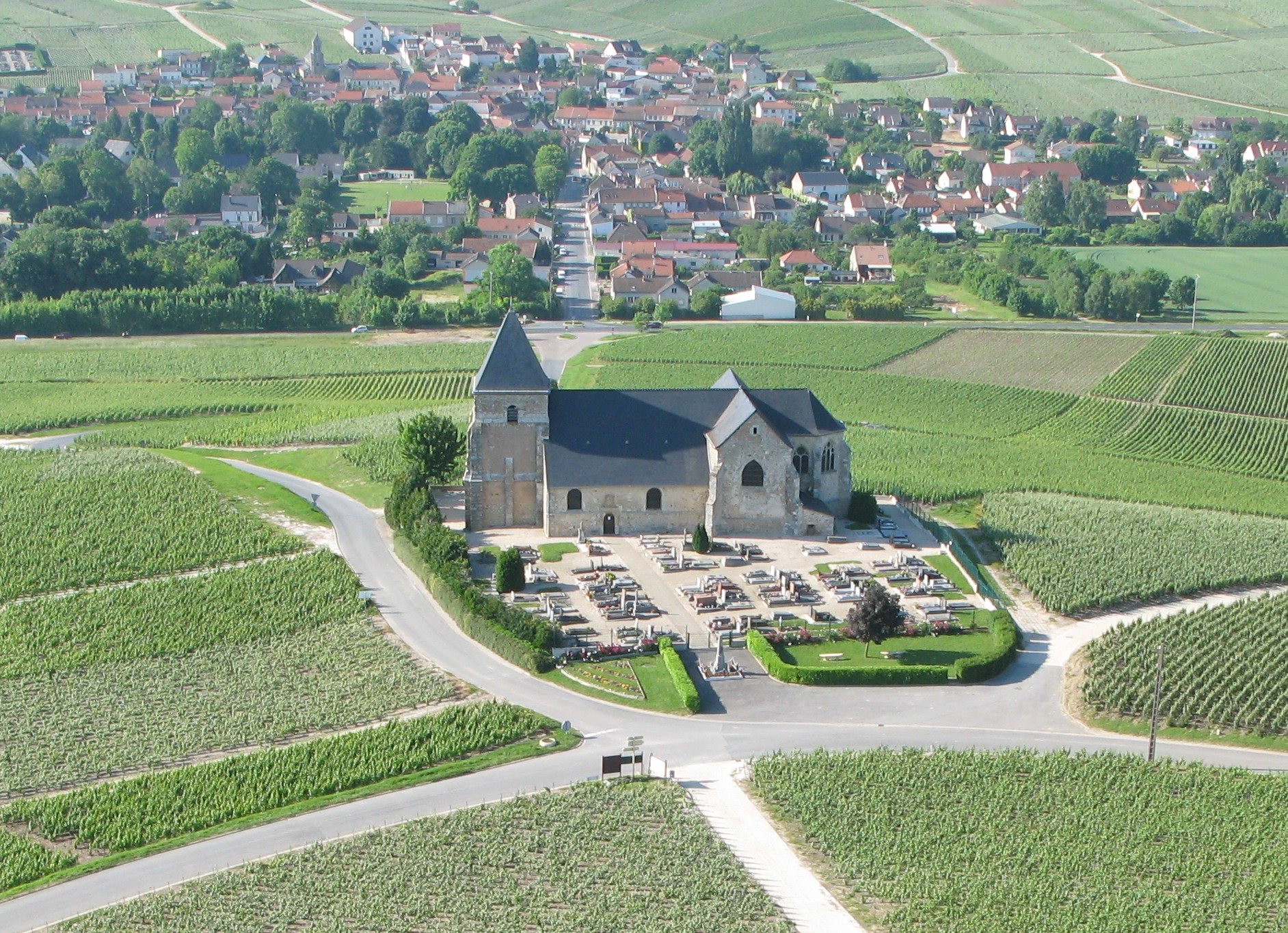
- The church in Chavot
- Location of Chavot-Courcourt
- Location within France Location within Grand Est
- Coordinates: 49°00′16″N 3°55′50″E
- Country: France
- Region: Grand Est
- Department: Marne
- Arrondissement: Épernay
- Canton: Épernay-2
- Intercommunality: CA Épernay, Coteaux et Plaine de Champagne

Government
  - Mayor (2020–2026): Gérard Butin
- Area^{1}: 4.42 km^{2} (1.71 sq mi)
- Elevation: 223 m (732 ft)
- Population (2023): 340
  - Density: 77/km^{2} (200/sq mi)
- Time zone: UTC+01:00 (CET)
  - Summer (DST): UTC+02:00 (CEST)
- INSEE/Postal code: 51142 /51530
- ^{1} French Land Register data, which excludes lakes, ponds, glaciers > 1 km^{2} (0.386 sq mi or 247 acres) and river estuaries.

Chavot-Courcourt (French pronunciation: [ʃavo kuʁkuʁ]) is a commune in the Marne department in north-eastern France.

== See also ==
- Communes of the Marne department
