= Les Istres-et-Bury =

Istres-et-Bury
- Commune
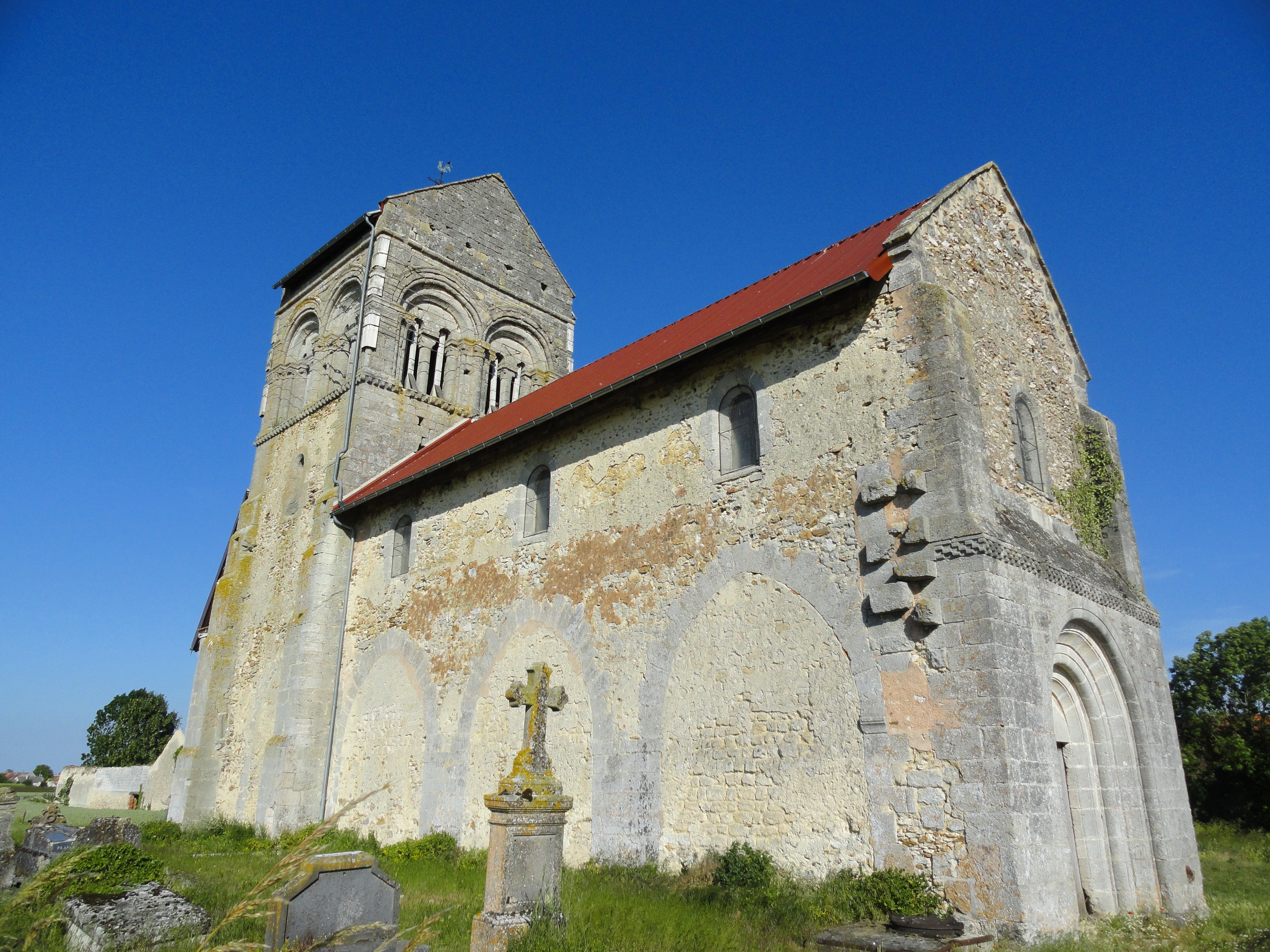
- The church in Les Istres
- Location of Istres-et-Bury
- Location within France Location within Grand Est
- Coordinates: 48°59′09″N 4°05′28″E
- Country: France
- Region: Grand Est
- Department: Marne
- Arrondissement: Épernay
- Canton: Épernay-2
- Intercommunality: CA Épernay, Coteaux et Plaine de Champagne

Government
  - Mayor (2020–2026): Jean-Michel Colin
- Area^{1}: 5.15 km^{2} (1.99 sq mi)
- Elevation: 84 m (276 ft)
- Population (2023): 92
  - Density: 18/km^{2} (46/sq mi)
- Time zone: UTC+01:00 (CET)
  - Summer (DST): UTC+02:00 (CEST)
- INSEE/Postal code: 51302 /51190
- ^{1} French Land Register data, which excludes lakes, ponds, glaciers > 1 km^{2} (0.386 sq mi or 247 acres) and river estuaries.

Les Istres-et-Bury (French pronunciation: [le.z‿istʁ e byʁi]) is a commune in the Marne department in the Grand Est region in north-eastern France.

== See also ==
- Communes of the Marne department
