= Flavigny, Marne =

Flavigny
- Commune
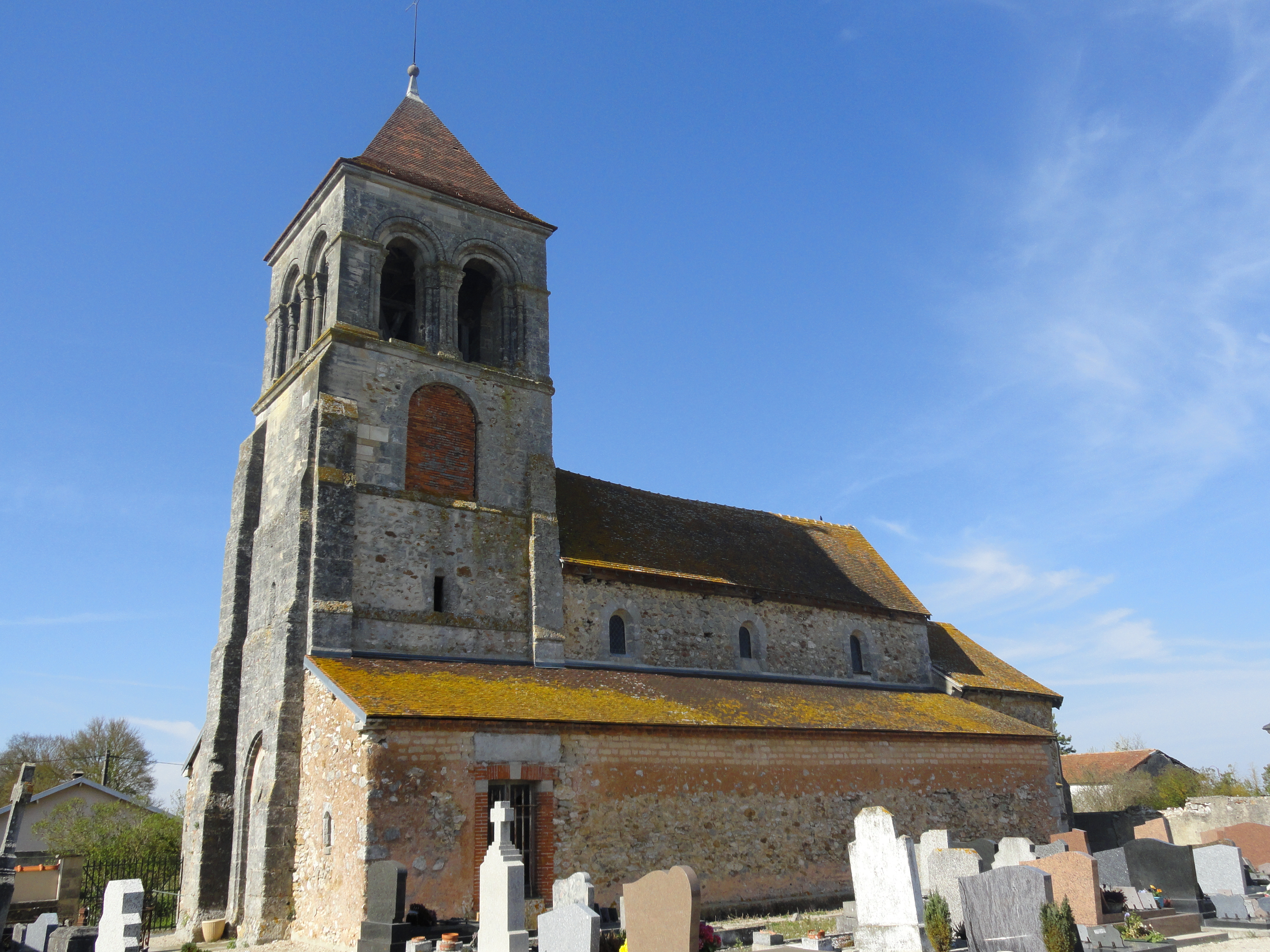
- The church in Flavigny
- Location of Flavigny
- Location within France Location within Grand Est
- Coordinates: 48°58′34″N 4°03′35″E
- Country: France
- Region: Grand Est
- Department: Marne
- Arrondissement: Épernay
- Canton: Épernay-2
- Intercommunality: CA Épernay, Coteaux et Plaine de Champagne

Government
  - Mayor (2020–2026): Amélie Pradalet
- Area^{1}: 7.98 km^{2} (3.08 sq mi)
- Elevation: 95 m (312 ft)
- Population (2023): 172
  - Density: 21.6/km^{2} (55.8/sq mi)
- Time zone: UTC+01:00 (CET)
  - Summer (DST): UTC+02:00 (CEST)
- INSEE/Postal code: 51251 /51190
- ^{1} French Land Register data, which excludes lakes, ponds, glaciers > 1 km^{2} (0.386 sq mi or 247 acres) and river estuaries.

Flavigny (French pronunciation: [flaviɲi]) is a commune in the Marne department in north-eastern France.

== See also ==
- Communes of the Marne department
