= Mancy, Marne =

Mancy
- Commune
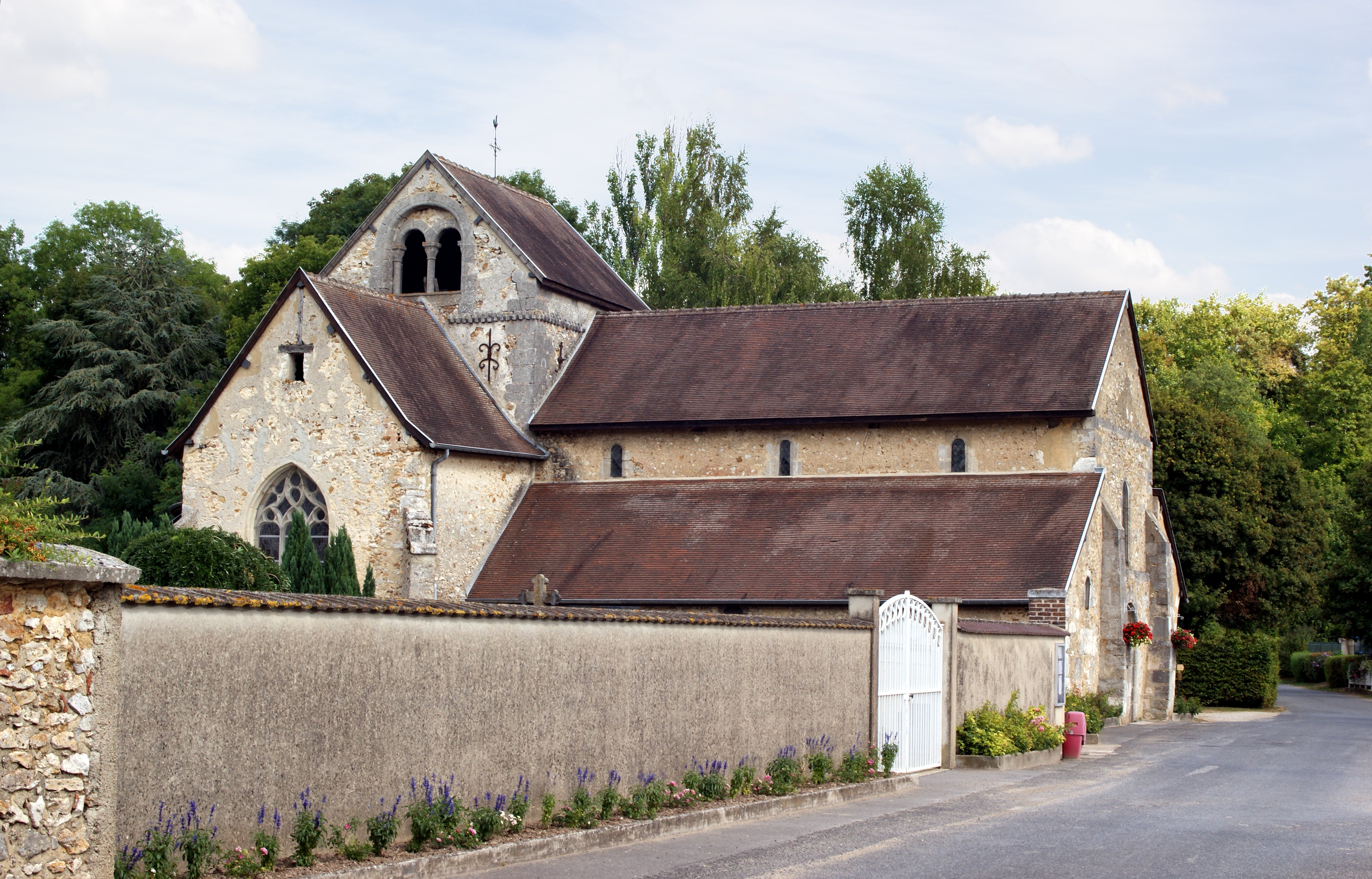
- The church in Mancy

- Coat of arms
- Location of Mancy
- Location within France Location within Grand Est
- Coordinates: 48°58′58″N 3°56′01″E
- Country: France
- Region: Grand Est
- Department: Marne
- Arrondissement: Épernay
- Canton: Épernay-2
- Intercommunality: CA Épernay, Coteaux et Plaine de Champagne

Government
  - Mayor (2020–2026): Christophe Desmarets
- Area^{1}: 3.57 km^{2} (1.38 sq mi)
- Elevation: 139 m (456 ft)
- Population (2023): 233
  - Density: 65.3/km^{2} (169/sq mi)
- Time zone: UTC+01:00 (CET)
  - Summer (DST): UTC+02:00 (CEST)
- INSEE/Postal code: 51342 /51530
- ^{1} French Land Register data, which excludes lakes, ponds, glaciers > 1 km^{2} (0.386 sq mi or 247 acres) and river estuaries.

Mancy (French pronunciation: [mɑ̃si]) is a commune in the Marne department in north-eastern France.

== See also ==
- Communes of the Marne department
