= Champagne Bricout =

Champagne company

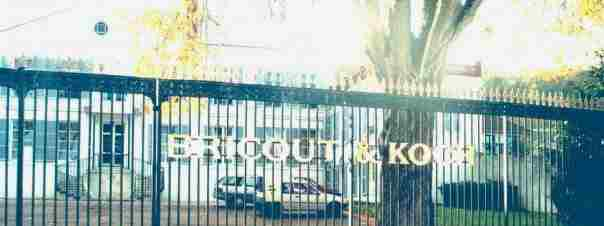
Bricout & Koch company headquarters in 1998

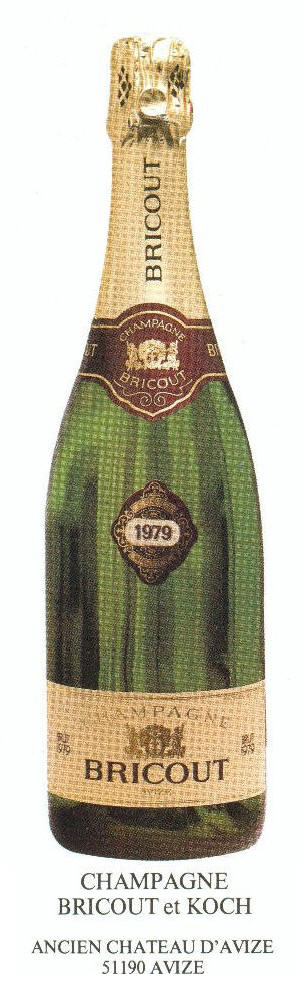
Bottle of Champagne Bricout vintage 79

Champagne Bricout is a champagne company founded in 1966 by Christian Andreas Kupferberg in Avize, France. It was a subsidiary of Kupferberg Sekt, producing 3 million bottles of champagne in 1998.

== History ==
Martin Financial acquired the company in 1998, but due to financial difficulties, sold it to the financial holding US-Luxembourg Opson Schneider in 2003. Opson Schneider filed for bankruptcy, which caused a scandal unprecedented in Champagne, Following the liquidation of the assets of Pierre Martin, LVMH, and Vranken-Pommery Monopole, 400 hectares of vineyards are now shared, including 200 hectares from Bricout, Avize.
