= Canton of Épernay-2 =

Coordinates: 49.04°N 3.95°E

The canton of Épernay-2 is an administrative division of the Marne department, northeastern France. Its borders were modified at the French canton reorganisation which came into effect in March 2015. Its seat is in Épernay.

It consists of the following communes:

1. Avize
2. Brugny-Vaudancourt
3. Chavot-Courcourt
4. Chouilly
5. Cramant
6. Cuis
7. Épernay (partly)
8. Flavigny
9. Grauves
10. Les Istres-et-Bury
11. Mancy
12. Monthelon
13. Morangis
14. Moussy
15. Oiry
16. Pierry
17. Plivot
18. Vinay
