= Monthelon, Marne =

Monthelon
- Commune
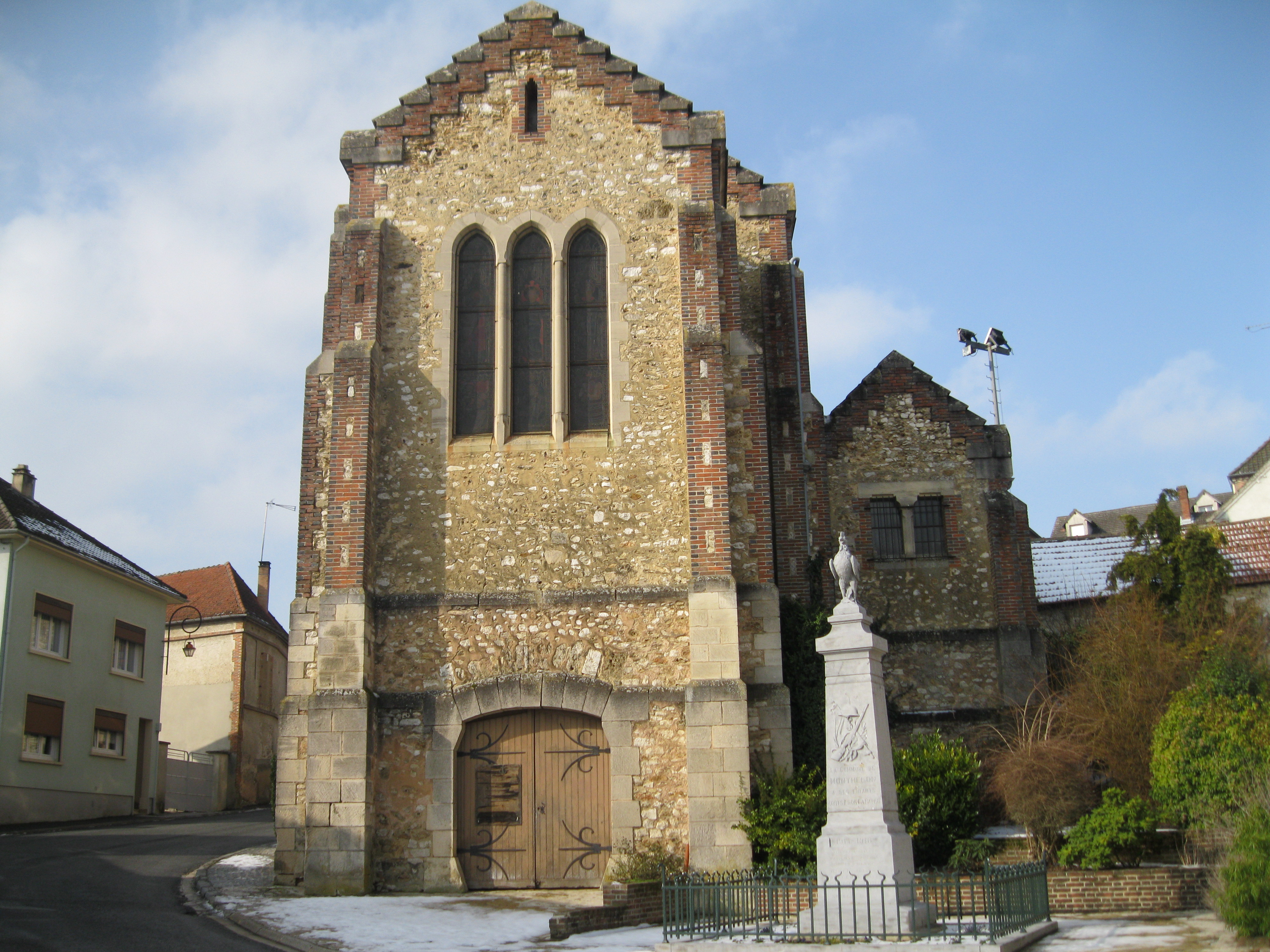
- The church in Monthelon

- Coat of arms
- Location of Monthelon
- Location within France Location within Grand Est
- Coordinates: 48°59′38″N 3°56′09″E
- Country: France
- Region: Grand Est
- Department: Marne
- Arrondissement: Épernay
- Canton: Épernay-2
- Intercommunality: CA Épernay, Coteaux et Plaine de Champagne

Government
  - Mayor (2020–2026): Cédric Pienne
- Area^{1}: 2.66 km^{2} (1.03 sq mi)
- Elevation: 166 m (545 ft)
- Population (2023): 334
  - Density: 126/km^{2} (325/sq mi)
- Time zone: UTC+01:00 (CET)
  - Summer (DST): UTC+02:00 (CEST)
- INSEE/Postal code: 51378 /51530
- ^{1} French Land Register data, which excludes lakes, ponds, glaciers > 1 km^{2} (0.386 sq mi or 247 acres) and river estuaries.

Monthelon (French pronunciation: [mɔ̃tlɔ̃]) is a commune in the Marne department in north-eastern France.

== See also ==
- Communes of the Marne department
