= Hôtel de Ville, Épernay =

Town hall in Épernay, France

Hôtel de Ville
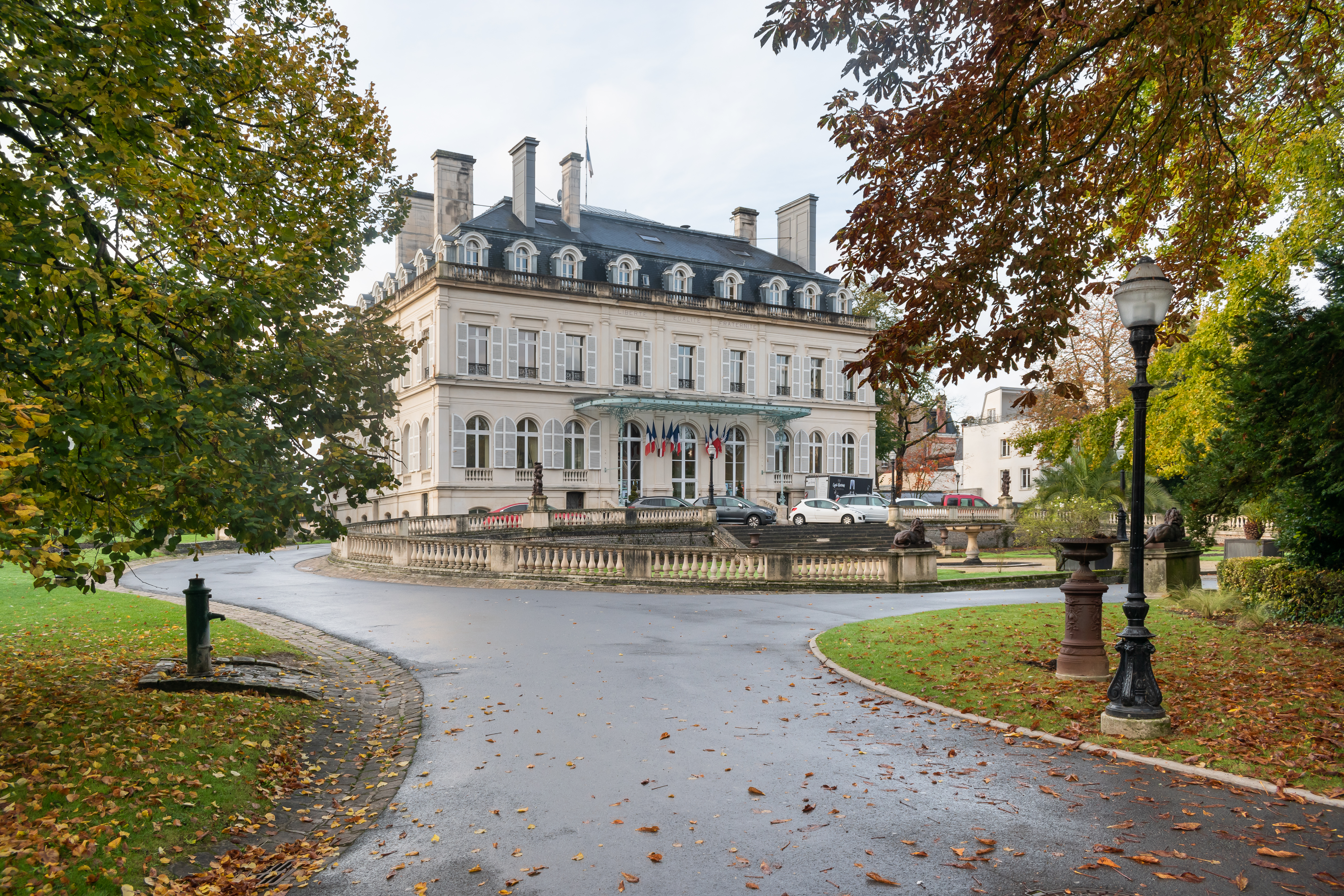
- The main frontage of the Hôtel de Ville in October 2021

General information
- Type: City hall
- Architectural style: Neoclassical style
- Location: Épernay, France
- Coordinates: 49.0438°N 3.9586°E
- Completed: 1858

Design and construction
- Architect: Victor Lenoir

Monument historique
- Official name: Hôtel de Ville, ancien hôtel Auban-Moët
- Type: Inscrit
- Designated: 2012
- Reference no.: PA51000018

The Hôtel de Ville (French pronunciation: [otɛl də vil], City Hall) is a municipal building in Épernay, Marne, in northern France, standing on Avenue de Champagne. It was designated a monument historique by the French government in 2012.

== History ==
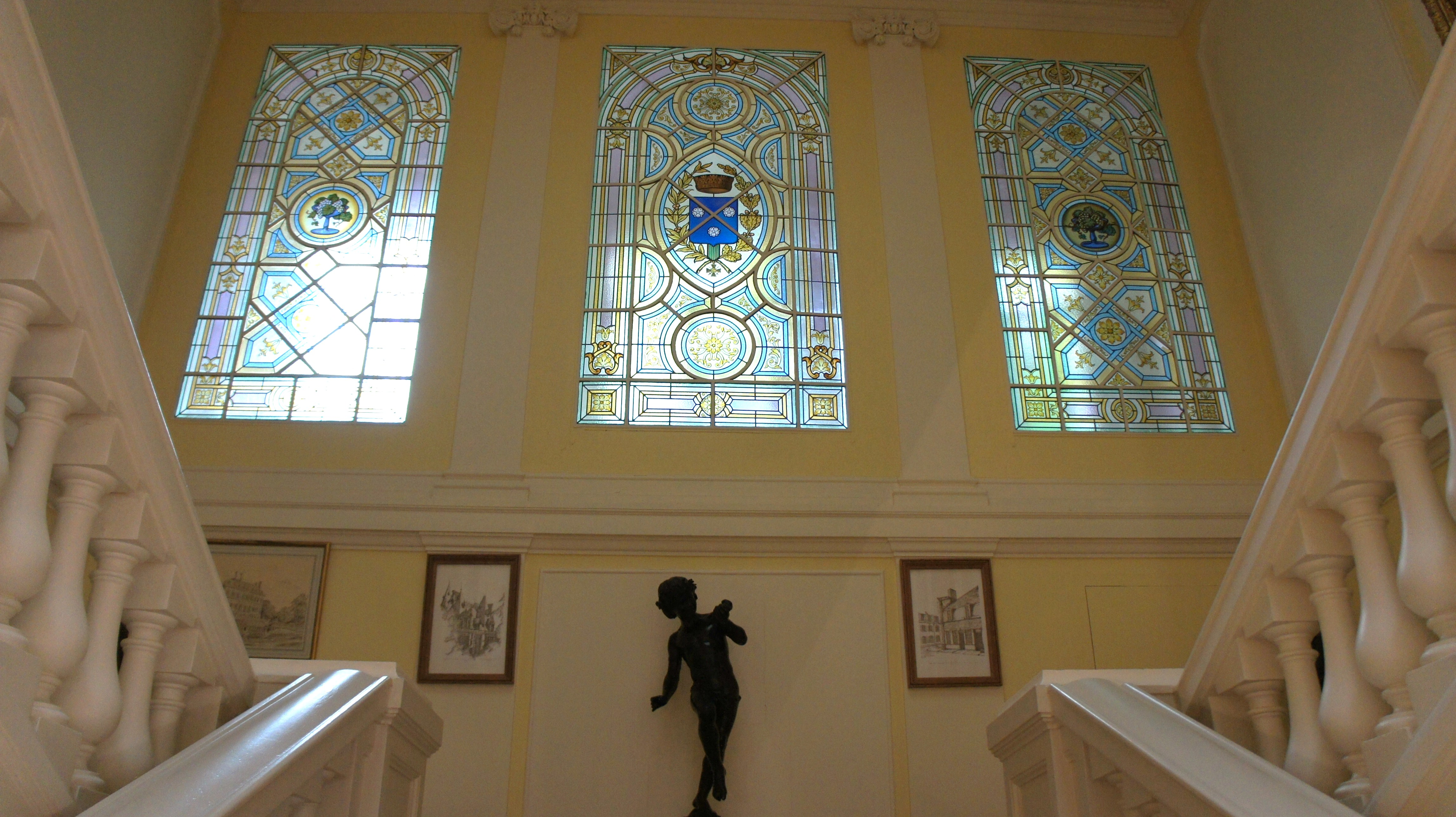
The grand staircase

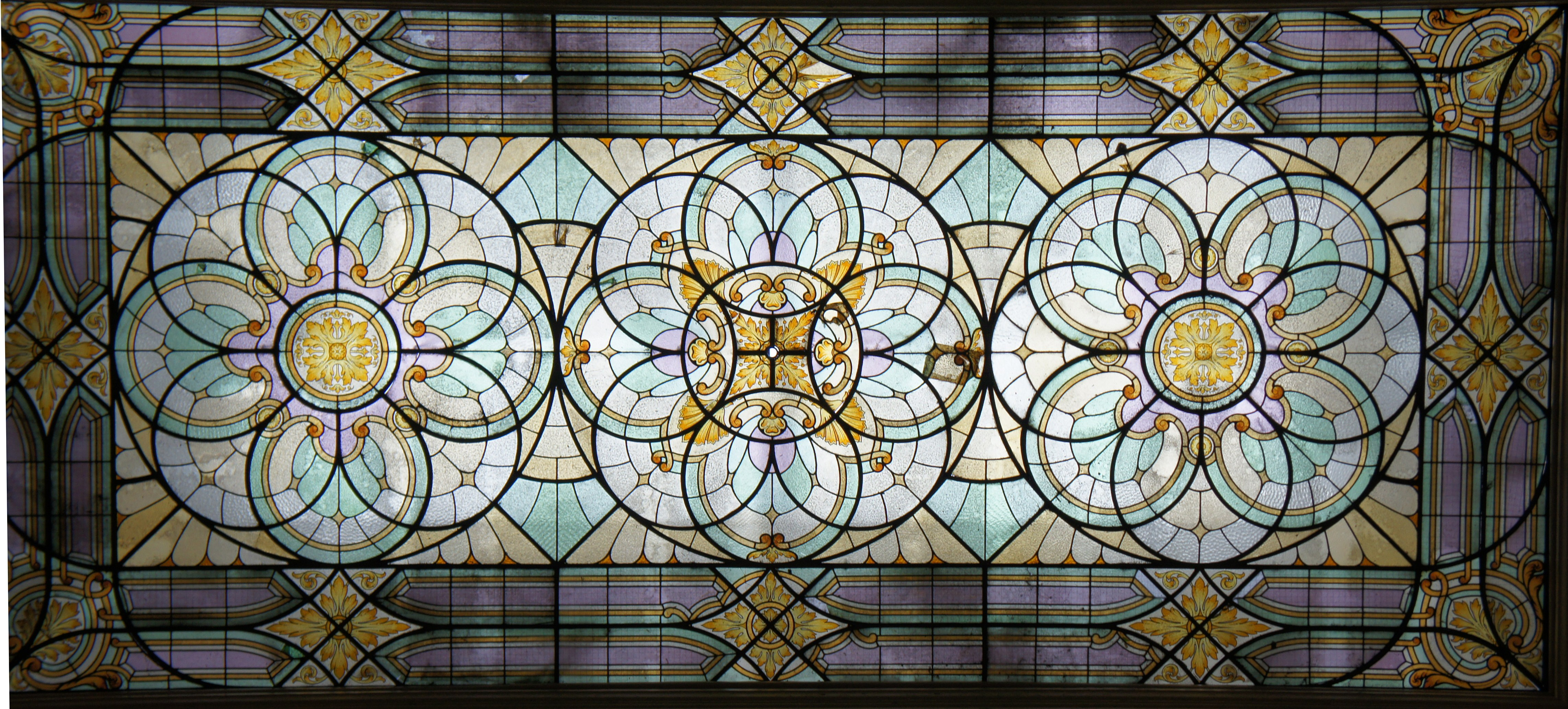
Glass ceiling in the entrance hall

Following the French Revolution, the new town council initially met in the Abbey of Saint-Martin which was stood on the east side of what is now Place Hugues Plomb from around 1032. After the Augustinian monks, who had lived in the abbey, were driven out in 1790, the building was seized by the state and handed over to the council in 1793. However, by the early 20th century, after a century of municipal use, it was in a dilapidated state and the council led by the mayor, Édouard Fleuricourt, decided to demolish it and to erect a new building on the same site. Although work was underway by the start of the First World War, progress was interrupted by the war and what works had been completed were destroyed by German shelling during the First Battle of the Marne in September 1914.

After the war, the council led by the mayor, Jean Chandon Moët, decided to acquire a suitable building for municipal purposes. The building they selected was the Hôtel Auban-Moët on the north side of what is now Avenue de Champagne. The building was commissioned by the wine merchant, Camille Jacques Victor Auban and his wife, Sidonie Rachel Moët de Romont, in the mid-19th century. It was designed in the neoclassical style, built in ashlar stone and was completed in 1858.

The design involved a symmetrical main frontage of nine bays facing north onto the garden. The central section of three bays featured three round-headed doorways with a glass canopy above. The rest of the north-facing frontage was fenestrated by round-headed windows with shutters on the ground floor and by square-headed windows with shutters and cornices on the first floor. The bays in the central section and the outer bays were flanked by pilasters supporting an entablature, a cornice and a balustrade. The rear façade, facing south onto Avenue de Champagne, was fenestrated in a similar style but the central bay was canted forward and was surmounted by a hexagonal roof.

Several outbuildings laid out in a horseshoe shape were constructed in red brick at the north end of the site to a design by Alphonse Gosset and completed in 1885. The garden was landscaped with an artificial grotto, a temple and two ponds to a design by Eugène Bühler and completed around the same time. After a major programme of conversion works had been completed, allowing the building to be used as a town hall, it was officially re-opened by the president of France, Raymond Poincaré, on 8 February 1920. The principal rooms created were the Salle des Mariages (wedding room) and the Salle du Conseil (council chamber).

A war memorial, designed by Henri Giraud in the form of an angel of victory standing in front of a semi-circular platform, intended the commemorate the lives of local people who had died in the war, was officially inaugurated on 6 July 1924. During the liberation of the town by the US Third Army, commanded by General George S. Patton, on 28 August 1944, during the Second World War, American troops advanced along Rue de Reims at the north end of the site, and a marker was placed there after the war to commemorate the route that they had taken.
