= Gaston Chiquet =

Gaston Chiquet is a producer of grower champagne and an original member of Club Trésors de Champagne.

The house has 23 hectares in Hautvillers, Dizy, Aÿ, Mareuil-sur-Aÿ, Crugny and Nanteuil-la-Forêt planted to 46% Chardonnay, 20% Pinot noir and 34% Pinot Meunier.
