= Plivot =

- Commune
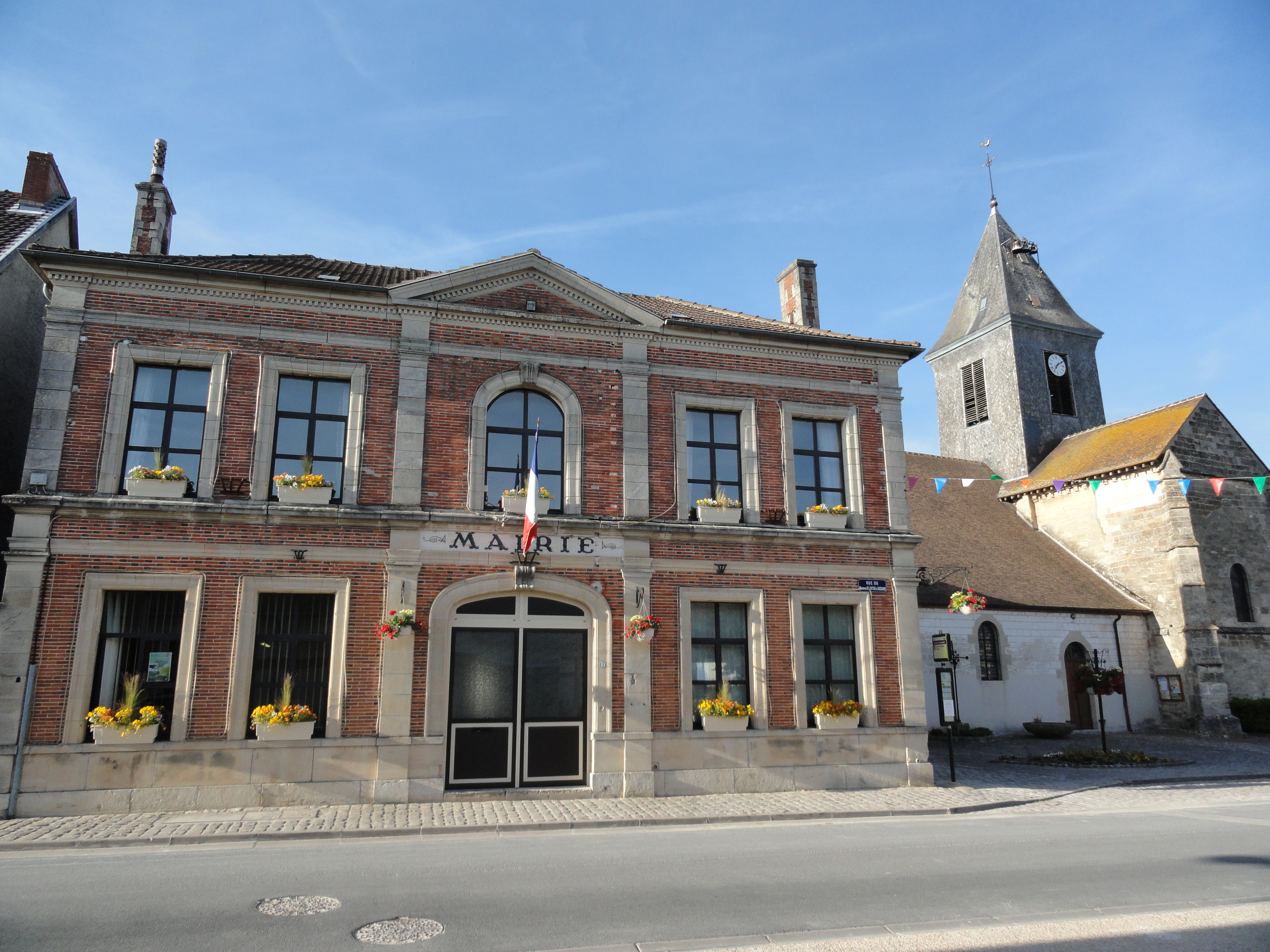
- The town hall in Plivot

- Coat of arms
- Location of Plivot
- Location within France Location within Grand Est
- Coordinates: 49°01′05″N 4°04′16″E
- Country: France
- Region: Grand Est
- Department: Marne
- Arrondissement: Épernay
- Canton: Épernay-2
- Intercommunality: CA Épernay, Coteaux et Plaine de Champagne

Government
  - Mayor (2020–2026): Gilles Varnier
- Area^{1}: 12.6 km^{2} (4.9 sq mi)
- Elevation: 76 m (249 ft)
- Population (2023): 755
  - Density: 59.9/km^{2} (155/sq mi)
- Time zone: UTC+01:00 (CET)
  - Summer (DST): UTC+02:00 (CEST)
- INSEE/Postal code: 51434 /51150
- ^{1} French Land Register data, which excludes lakes, ponds, glaciers > 1 km^{2} (0.386 sq mi or 247 acres) and river estuaries.

Plivot (French pronunciation: [plivo]) is a commune in the Marne department in north-eastern France. Between 2020 and 2026, the mayor is Gilles Varnier.

Between 1 December 1939 and 15 February 1940, the No. 139 Squadron RAF was deployed to a local airfield nearby with Blenheim IVs, forming part of the RAF Advanced Air Striking Force.

== See also ==
- Communes of the Marne department
