= Henri Goutorbe =

Champagne producers

Henri Goutorbe is a Grower Champagne and member of Club Trésors de Champagne. The 25 hectares of vines located in Vallée de la Marne produce 15,000 cases annually. The vineyards are planted to 70 percent pinot noir, 27 percent chardonnay and three percent pinot meunier. The family has Premier cru sites in Mareuil-sur-Ay, Mutigny and Bisseuil, and a Grand cru site in Aÿ.
