= Vinay, Marne =

Vinay
- Commune
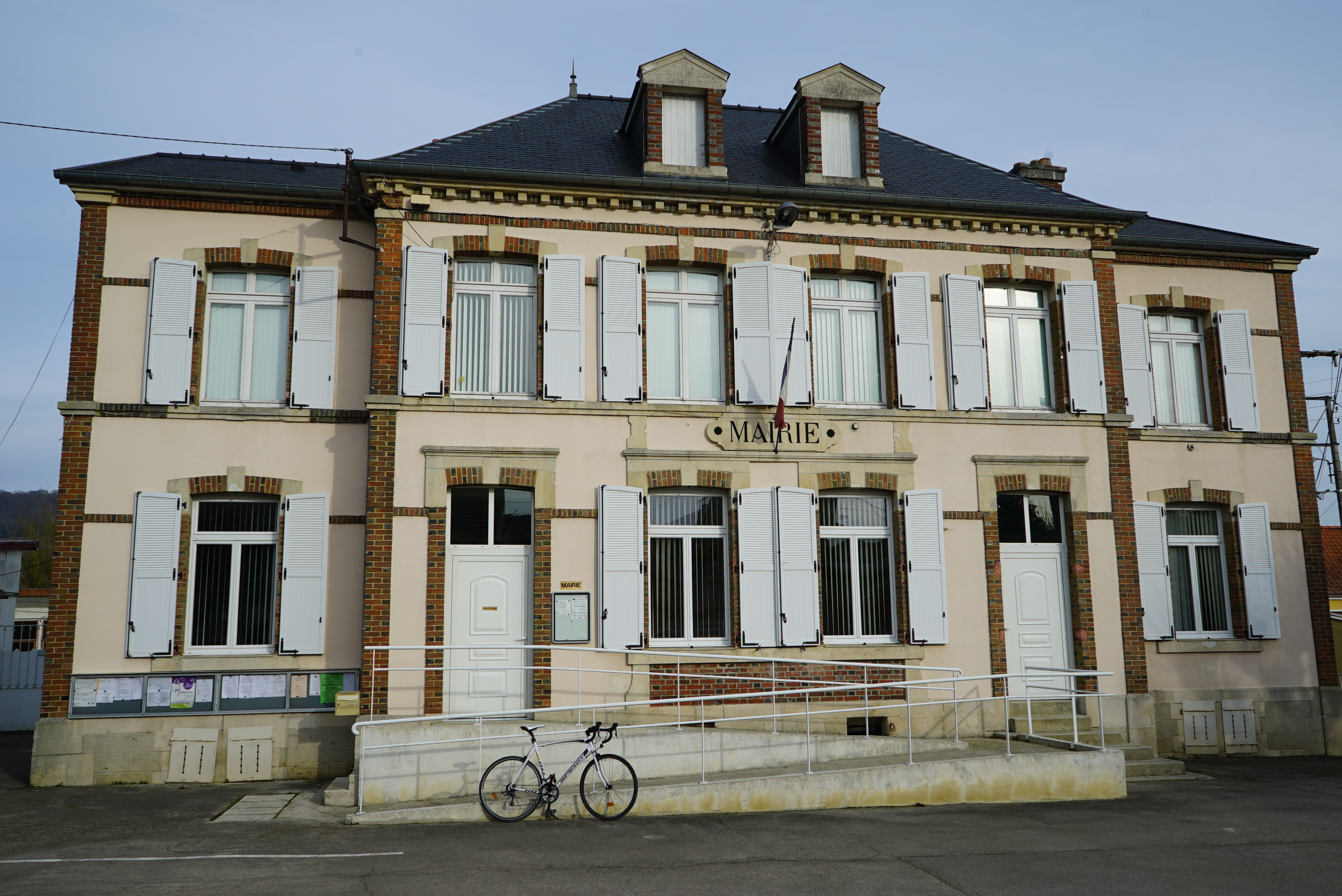
- The town hall in Vinay

- Coat of arms
- Location of Vinay
- Location within France Location within Grand Est
- Coordinates: 49°00′39″N 3°53′58″E
- Country: France
- Region: Grand Est
- Department: Marne
- Arrondissement: Épernay
- Canton: Épernay-2
- Intercommunality: CA Épernay, Coteaux et Plaine de Champagne

Government
  - Mayor (2020–2026): Éric Filaine
- Area^{1}: 3.09 km^{2} (1.19 sq mi)
- Elevation: 133 m (436 ft)
- Population (2023): 535
  - Density: 173/km^{2} (448/sq mi)
- Time zone: UTC+01:00 (CET)
  - Summer (DST): UTC+02:00 (CEST)
- INSEE/Postal code: 51643 /51530
- ^{1} French Land Register data, which excludes lakes, ponds, glaciers > 1 km^{2} (0.386 sq mi or 247 acres) and river estuaries.

Vinay (French pronunciation: [vinɛ]) is a commune in the Marne department in north-eastern France.

== See also ==
- Communes of the Marne department
