= Maakan Tounkara =

French handball player (born 1983)

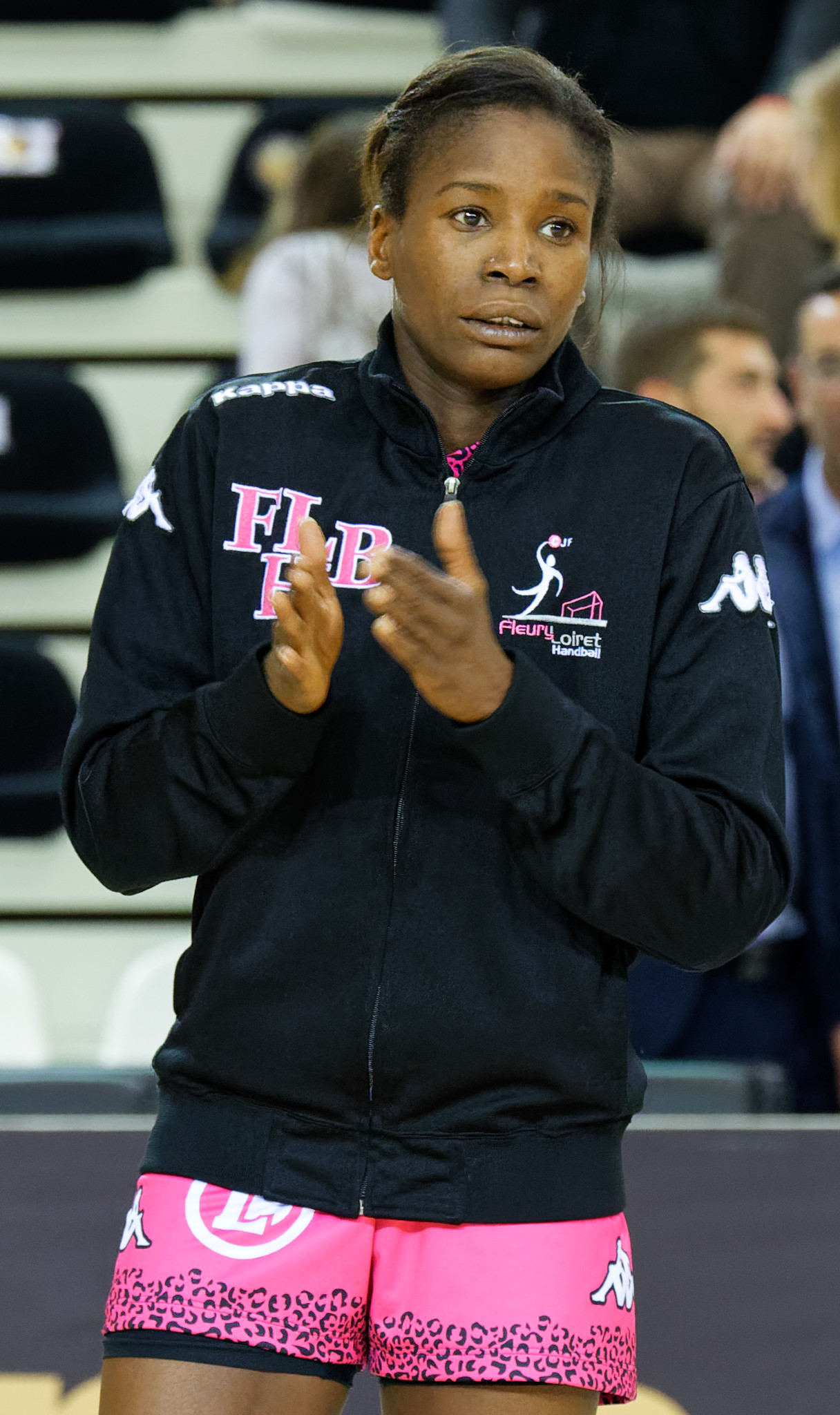
- Maakan Tounkara (2014)

Personal information
- Nationality: French
- Born: 12 March 1983 (age 43) Epernay, France
- Height: 1.64 m (5 ft 5 in)

Sport
- Sport: Handball
- Position: Right wing
- Number: 11
National team
Years	Team	Apps	(Gls)
2006-2016	France	75	(147)

Maakan Tounkara (born 1983) is a French former handball player, who played for the French national team. She participated at the 2008 Summer Olympics in China, where the French team placed fifth.
