= Brugny-Vaudancourt =

- Commune
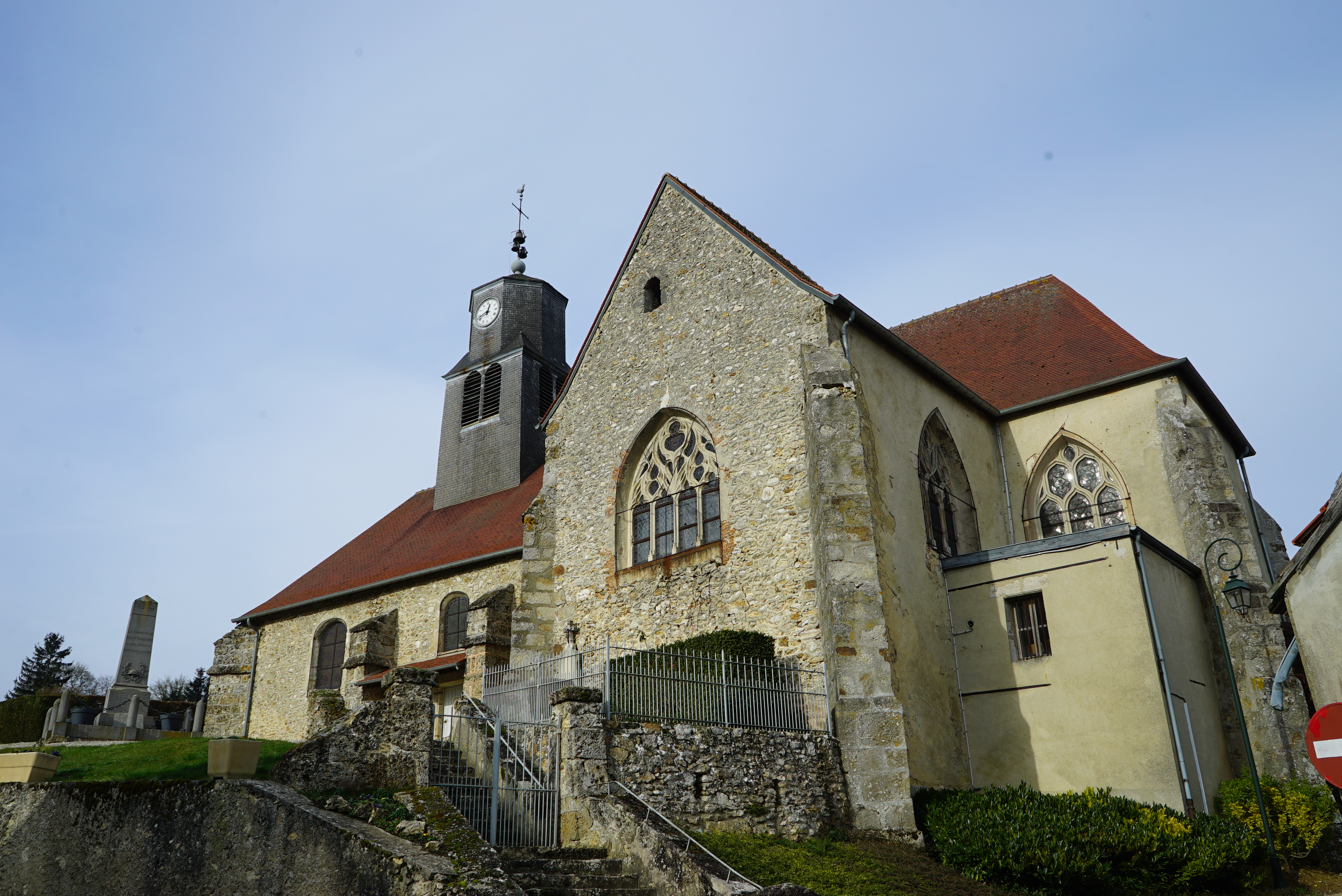
- The church in Brugny

- Coat of arms
- Location of Brugny-Vaudancourt
- Location within France Location within Grand Est
- Coordinates: 49°00′00″N 3°53′14″E
- Country: France
- Region: Grand Est
- Department: Marne
- Arrondissement: Épernay
- Canton: Épernay-2
- Intercommunality: CA Épernay, Coteaux et Plaine de Champagne

Government
  - Mayor (2020–2026): Alain Banchet
- Area^{1}: 19.87 km^{2} (7.67 sq mi)
- Elevation: 180 m (590 ft)
- Population (2023): 433
  - Density: 21.8/km^{2} (56.4/sq mi)
- Time zone: UTC+01:00 (CET)
  - Summer (DST): UTC+02:00 (CEST)
- INSEE/Postal code: 51093 /51530
- ^{1} French Land Register data, which excludes lakes, ponds, glaciers > 1 km^{2} (0.386 sq mi or 247 acres) and river estuaries.

Brugny-Vaudancourt (French pronunciation: [bʁyɲi vodɑ̃kuʁ]) is a commune in the Marne department in northeastern France.

== Population ==
Historical population
Year	Pop.	±% p.a.
1968	296	—
1975	292	−0.19%
1982	329	+1.72%
1990	310	−0.74%
1999	388	+2.53%
2007	433	+1.38%
2012	463	+1.35%
2017	450	−0.57%
2023	433	−0.64%
Source: INSEE

== See also ==
- Communes of the Marne department
