= Avize =

- Commune
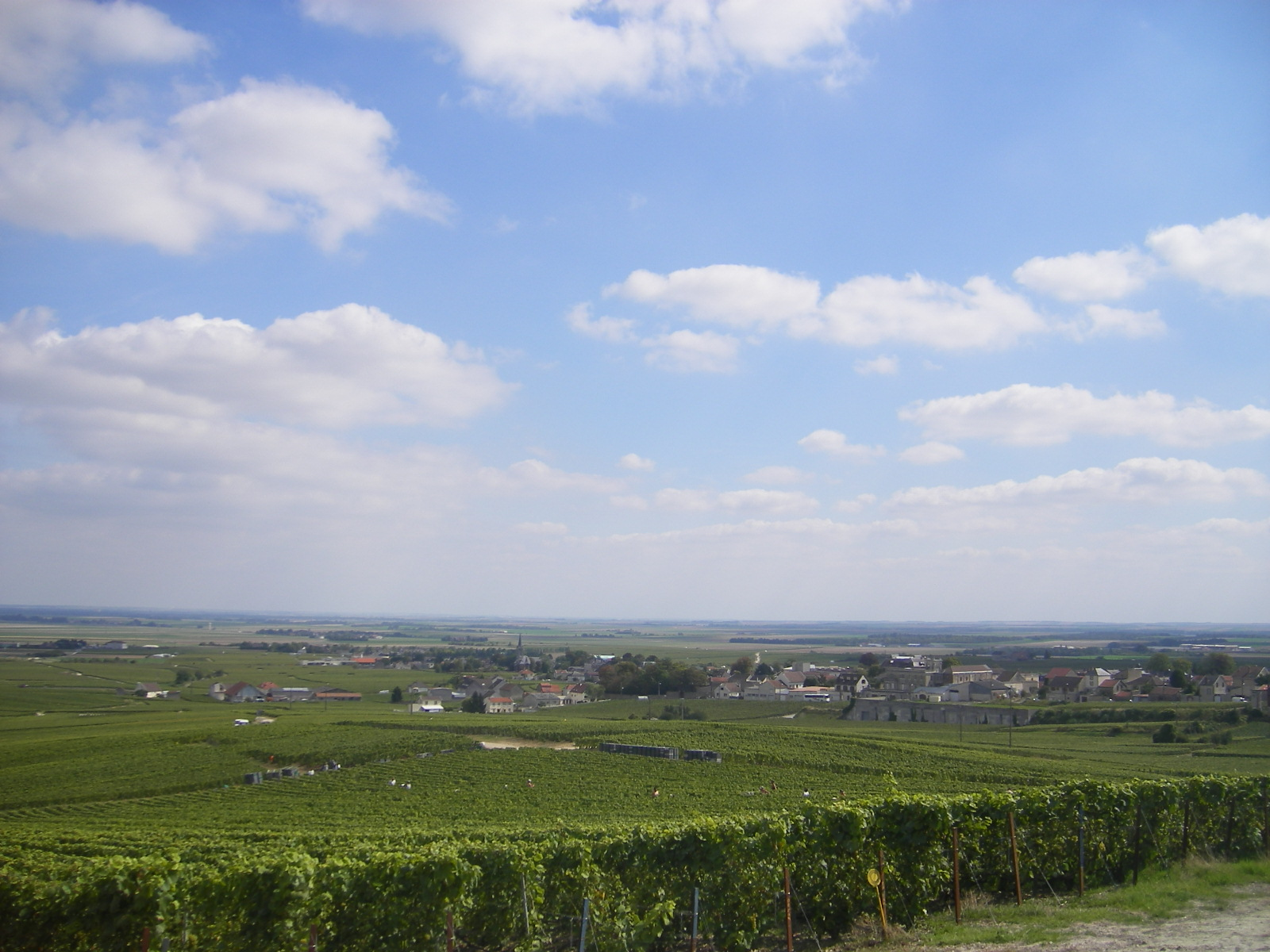
- A general view of Avize and its vineyards

- Coat of arms
- Location of Avize
- Location within France Location within Grand Est
- Coordinates: 48°58′20″N 4°00′37″E
- Country: France
- Region: Grand Est
- Department: Marne
- Arrondissement: Épernay
- Canton: Épernay-2
- Intercommunality: CA Épernay, Coteaux et Plaine de Champagne

Government
  - Mayor (2020–2026): Gilles Dulion
- Area^{1}: 7.62 km^{2} (2.94 sq mi)
- Elevation: 113 m (371 ft)
- Population (2023): 1,742
  - Density: 229/km^{2} (592/sq mi)
- Time zone: UTC+01:00 (CET)
  - Summer (DST): UTC+02:00 (CEST)
- INSEE/Postal code: 51029 /51190
- ^{1} French Land Register data, which excludes lakes, ponds, glaciers > 1 km^{2} (0.386 sq mi or 247 acres) and river estuaries.

Avize (French pronunciation: [aviz]) is a commune in the Marne department in northeastern France.

== Champagne ==
The village's vineyards are located in the Côte des Blancs subregion of Champagne, and are classified as grand cru (100%) in the Champagne vineyard classification.

Located in the heart of the Côte des Blancs, Avize is a village wine with many champagne houses. About 400 winegrowers harvest 3,350 tons of grapes annually. Its fermentation within the 12 km of the city cellars gave birth to the most prestigious wines of Champagne: blancs de blancs. Major champagne houses founded in Avize include De Cazanove (1811), Koch (1820), and Bricout (1966).

== Population ==
Historical population
Year	Pop.	±% p.a.
1968	1,980	—
1975	1,696	−2.19%
1982	1,836	+1.14%
1990	1,680	−1.10%
1999	1,619	−0.41%
2007	1,615	−0.03%
2012	1,791	+2.09%
2017	1,740	−0.58%
2023	1,742	+0.02%
Source: INSEE

== See also ==
- Communes of the Marne department
- Classification of Champagne vineyards
