= Paul Bara =

Paul Bara is a producer of grower champagne and an original member of the Club Trésors de Champagne. Paul Bara is a seventh-generation family business currently managed by Chantale Bara. Champagne Paul Bara is one of the few grower champagne producers in Bouzy. The planted vineyards are 11 hectares in area. Only the first pressing of the grapes is used in Paul Bara wines.
