= Champagne Pannier =

French champagne house

Champagne Pannier was founded in 1899 and its head office is situated in Château-Thierry, France. It is the largest champagne house in the western Marne Valley.

== History ==
Louis Eugène Pannier founded the Champagne House in 1899 near Épernay. In 1937, he moved the company to Château-Thierry where he purchased 12th century cellars, that measure 2.5 kilometres in length and 30 meters in depth. Here he found the perfect place to age his wines and this gave Champagne Pannier a new dimension. In 1974, a group of growers, now called Covama, joined forces and purchased the house of Pannier. This was the first and only time in Champagne that a group of growers purchased a négociant house. During a detailed study of the cellars, a group of archaeologists found a medieval stone carving of an archer in 2002. This archer became the symbol of Champagne Pannier extolling the same virtues of the wine: balance, precision, integrity.

== Certifications ==
Since 1997, the company received accreditation from the norms ISO and BRC. This framework is part of the ongoing policy of quality control.

== Activities ==
Pannier's cuvées are supplied all over France by a network of representatives (wine merchant, delicatessens, off-trade, B to B) and are exported to over twenty countries. These wines are distributed through traditional channels as well as duty-free. First class passengers on Virgin Atlantic, Eurostar and United Airlines are served Pannier champagne.

In addition to the medieval cellars which are one of the 6 proposed sites for the UNESCO charter, Champagne Pannier also has a state of the art 300 seats amphitheatre and function rooms.

== See also ==
- Champagne (wine)
- History of champagne
- Champagne production
- Grower champagne
- Château-Thierry
