= Sacy, Marne =

Sacy
- Commune
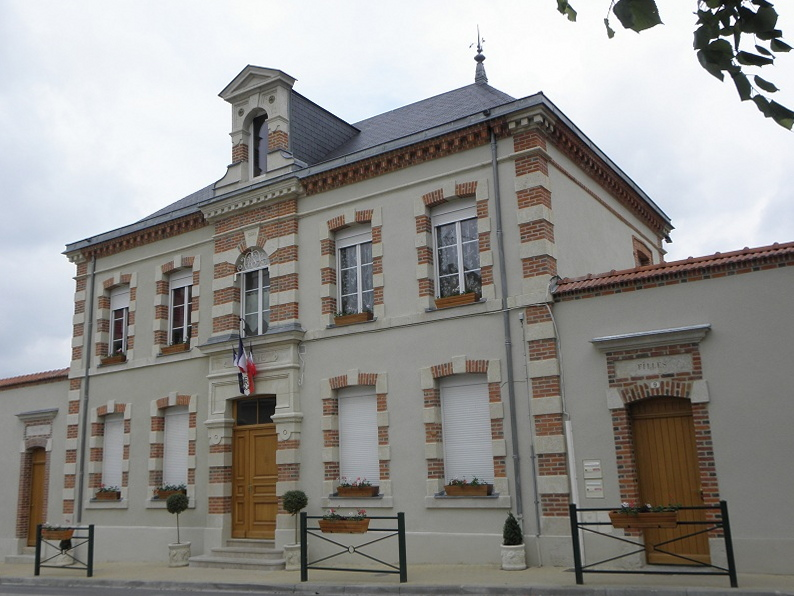
- The town hall in Sacy

- Coat of arms
- Location of Sacy
- Location within France Location within Grand Est
- Coordinates: 49°11′52″N 3°56′57″E
- Country: France
- Region: Grand Est
- Department: Marne
- Arrondissement: Reims
- Canton: Fismes-Montagne de Reims
- Intercommunality: CU Grand Reims

Government
  - Mayor (2020–2026): Éric Léger
- Area^{1}: 5.56 km^{2} (2.15 sq mi)
- Elevation: 125 m (410 ft)
- Highest elevation: 259 m (850 ft)
- Lowest elevation: 89 m (292 ft)
- Population (2023): 369
  - Density: 66.4/km^{2} (172/sq mi)
- Time zone: UTC+01:00 (CET)
  - Summer (DST): UTC+02:00 (CEST)
- INSEE/Postal code: 51471 /51500
- ^{1} French Land Register data, which excludes lakes, ponds, glaciers > 1 km^{2} (0.386 sq mi or 247 acres) and river estuaries.

Sacy (French pronunciation: [sasi]) is a commune in the Marne department in north-eastern France.

== See also ==
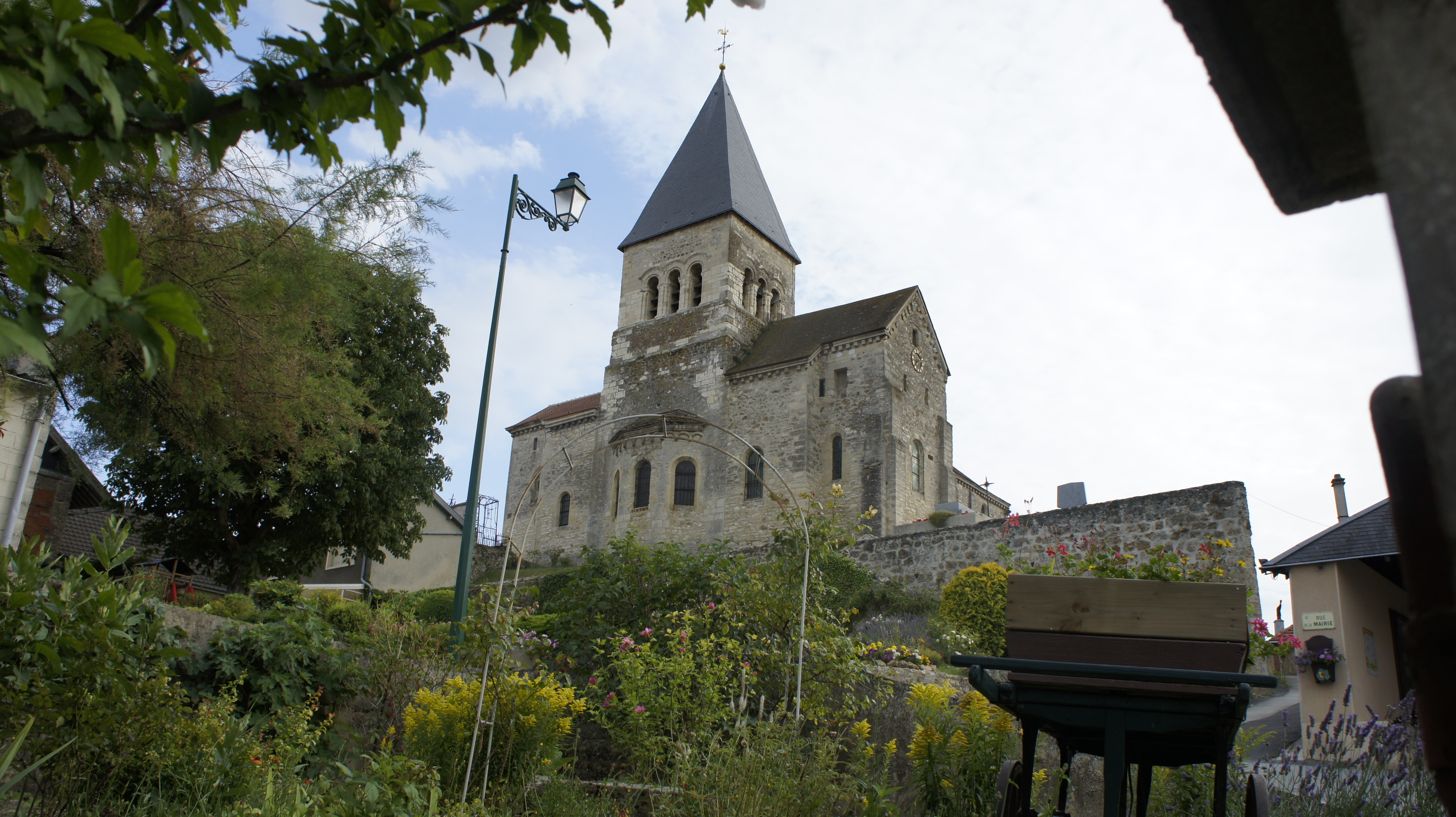

- Communes of the Marne department
- Montagne de Reims Regional Natural Park
