= Morangis, Marne =

Morangis
- Commune
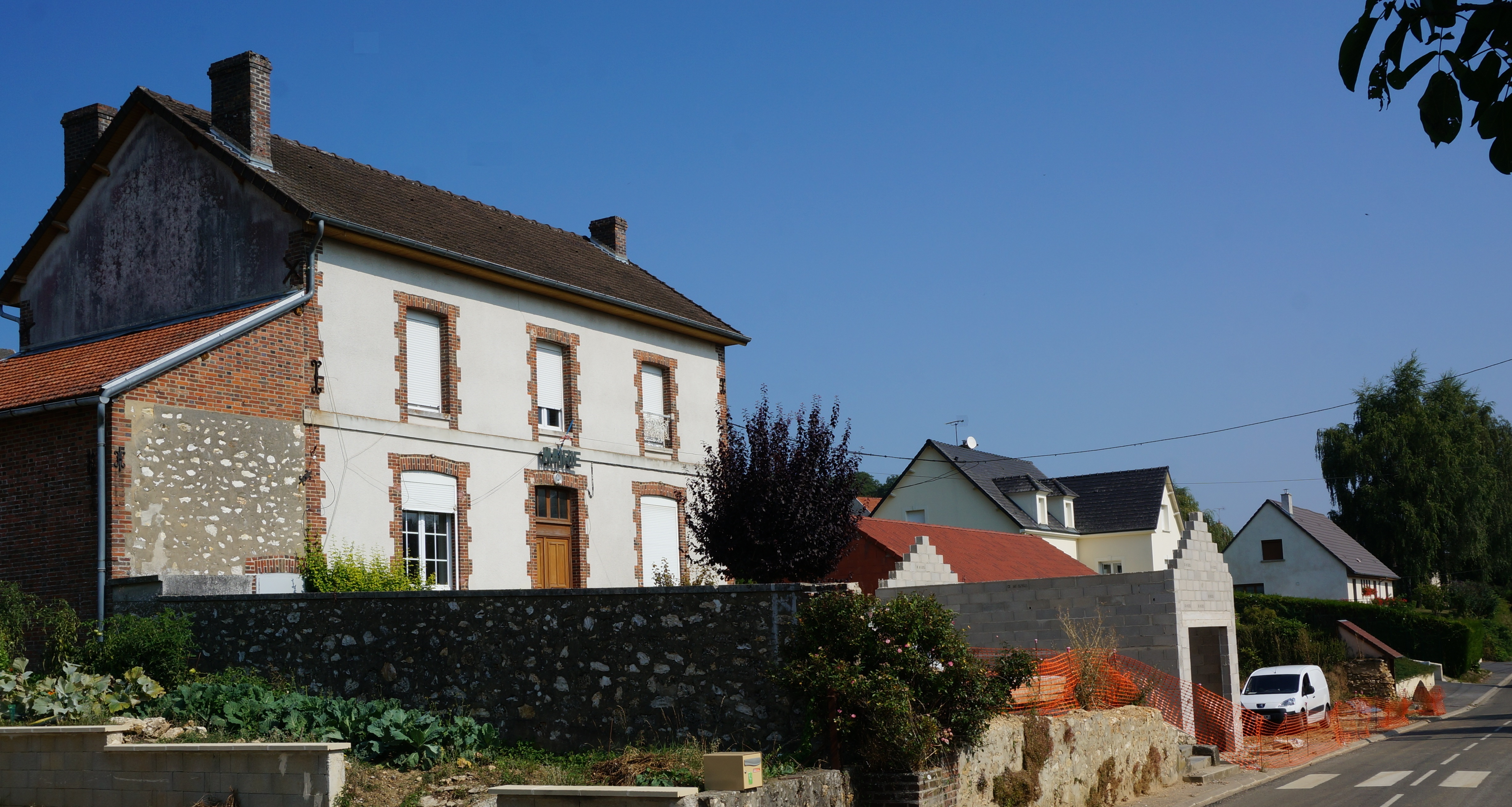
- The town hall in Morangis
- Location of Morangis
- Location within France Location within Grand Est
- Coordinates: 48°58′25″N 3°55′08″E
- Country: France
- Region: Grand Est
- Department: Marne
- Arrondissement: Épernay
- Canton: Épernay-2
- Intercommunality: CA Épernay, Coteaux et Plaine de Champagne

Government
  - Mayor (2020–2026): Patrice Durand
- Area^{1}: 8.65 km^{2} (3.34 sq mi)
- Elevation: 247 m (810 ft)
- Population (2023): 363
  - Density: 42.0/km^{2} (109/sq mi)
- Time zone: UTC+01:00 (CET)
  - Summer (DST): UTC+02:00 (CEST)
- INSEE/Postal code: 51384 /51530
- ^{1} French Land Register data, which excludes lakes, ponds, glaciers > 1 km^{2} (0.386 sq mi or 247 acres) and river estuaries.

Morangis (French: [mɔʁɑ̃ʒis]) is a commune in the Marne department in north-eastern France.

== See also ==
- Communes of the Marne department
