= Cramant =

- Commune
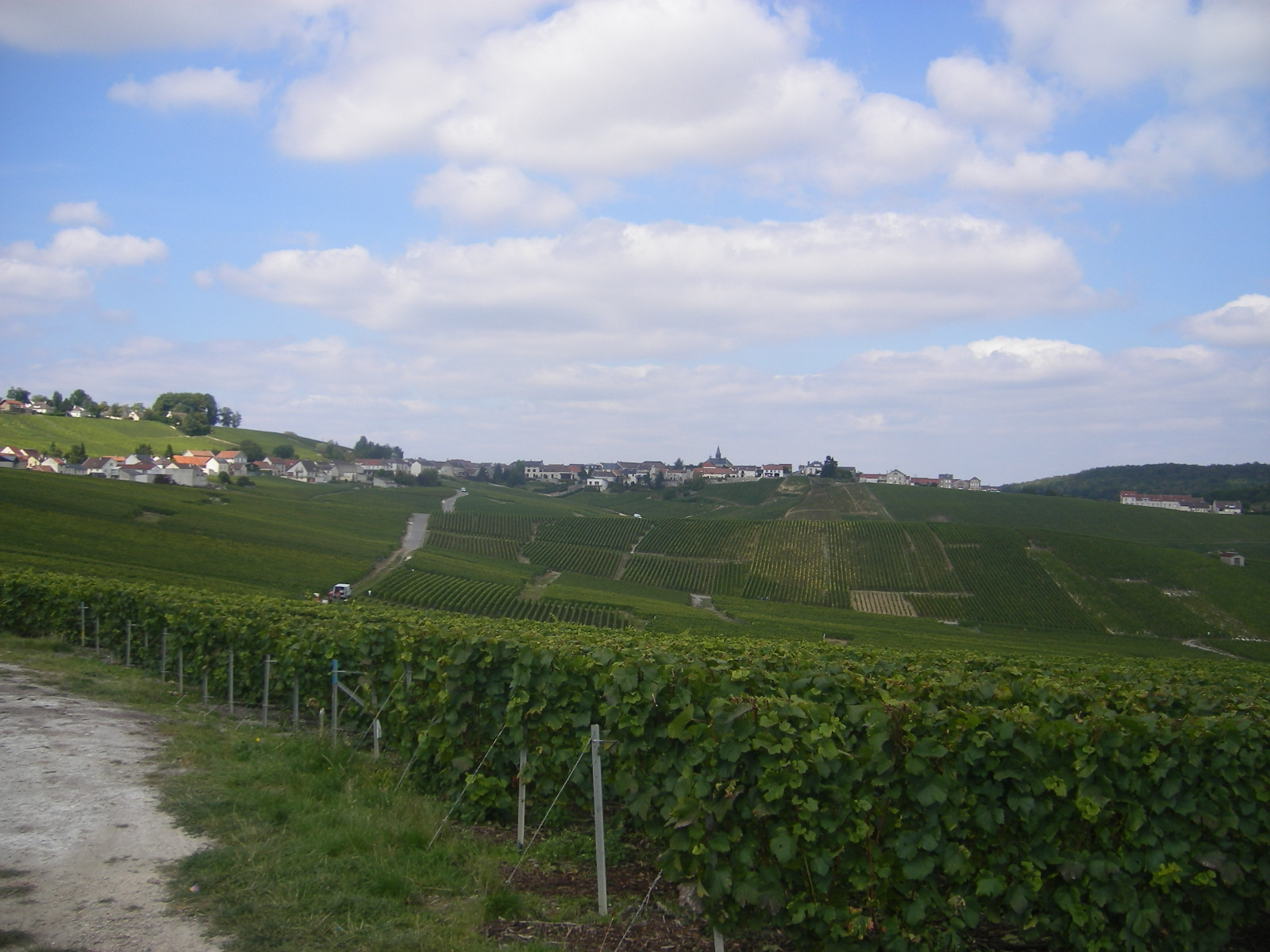
- Cramant as seen from the south, with its vineyards in the foreground.

- Coat of arms
- Location of Cramant
- Location within France Location within Grand Est
- Coordinates: 48°59′19″N 3°59′28″E
- Country: France
- Region: Grand Est
- Department: Marne
- Arrondissement: Épernay
- Canton: Épernay-2
- Intercommunality: CA Épernay, Coteaux et Plaine de Champagne

Government
  - Mayor (2020–2026): Claude Geraldy
- Area^{1}: 5.37 km^{2} (2.07 sq mi)
- Elevation: 146 m (479 ft)
- Population (2023): 871
  - Density: 162/km^{2} (420/sq mi)
- Time zone: UTC+01:00 (CET)
  - Summer (DST): UTC+02:00 (CEST)
- INSEE/Postal code: 51196 /51530
- ^{1} French Land Register data, which excludes lakes, ponds, glaciers > 1 km^{2} (0.386 sq mi or 247 acres) and river estuaries.

Cramant (French pronunciation: [kʁamɑ̃]) is a commune in the Marne department in north-eastern France.

== Champagne ==
The village's vineyards are located in the Côte des Blancs subregion of Champagne, and are classified as Grand Cru (100%) in the Champagne vineyard classification.

== See also ==
- Communes of the Marne department
- Classification of Champagne vineyards
