= Chouilly =

- Commune
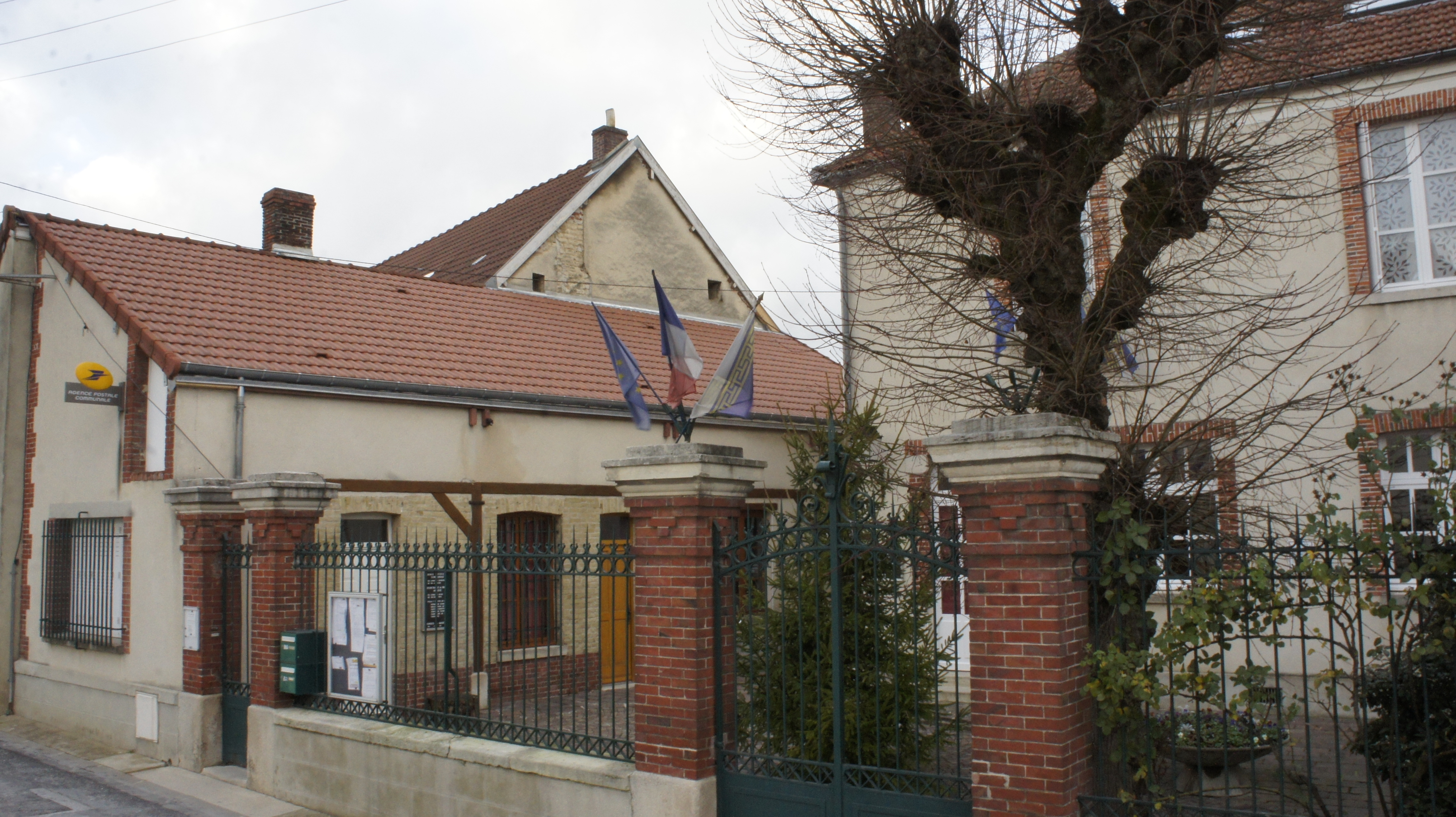
- The town hall (mairie, to the right in the picture) and the post office in Chouilly
- Location of Chouilly
- Location within France Location within Grand Est
- Coordinates: 49°01′34″N 4°00′52″E
- Country: France
- Region: Grand Est
- Department: Marne
- Arrondissement: Épernay
- Canton: Épernay-2
- Intercommunality: CA Épernay, Coteaux et Plaine de Champagne

Government
  - Mayor (2020–2026): Jacques Hostomme
- Area^{1}: 16.12 km^{2} (6.22 sq mi)
- Elevation: 137 m (449 ft)
- Population (2023): 1,064
  - Density: 66.00/km^{2} (171.0/sq mi)
- Time zone: UTC+01:00 (CET)
  - Summer (DST): UTC+02:00 (CEST)
- INSEE/Postal code: 51153 /51530
- ^{1} French Land Register data, which excludes lakes, ponds, glaciers > 1 km^{2} (0.386 sq mi or 247 acres) and river estuaries.

Chouilly (French pronunciation: [ʃuji]) is a commune in the Marne department in north-eastern France.

== Champagne ==
The village's vineyards are located in the Côte des Blancs subregion of Champagne, and are classified as Grand Cru (100%) in the Champagne vineyard classification.

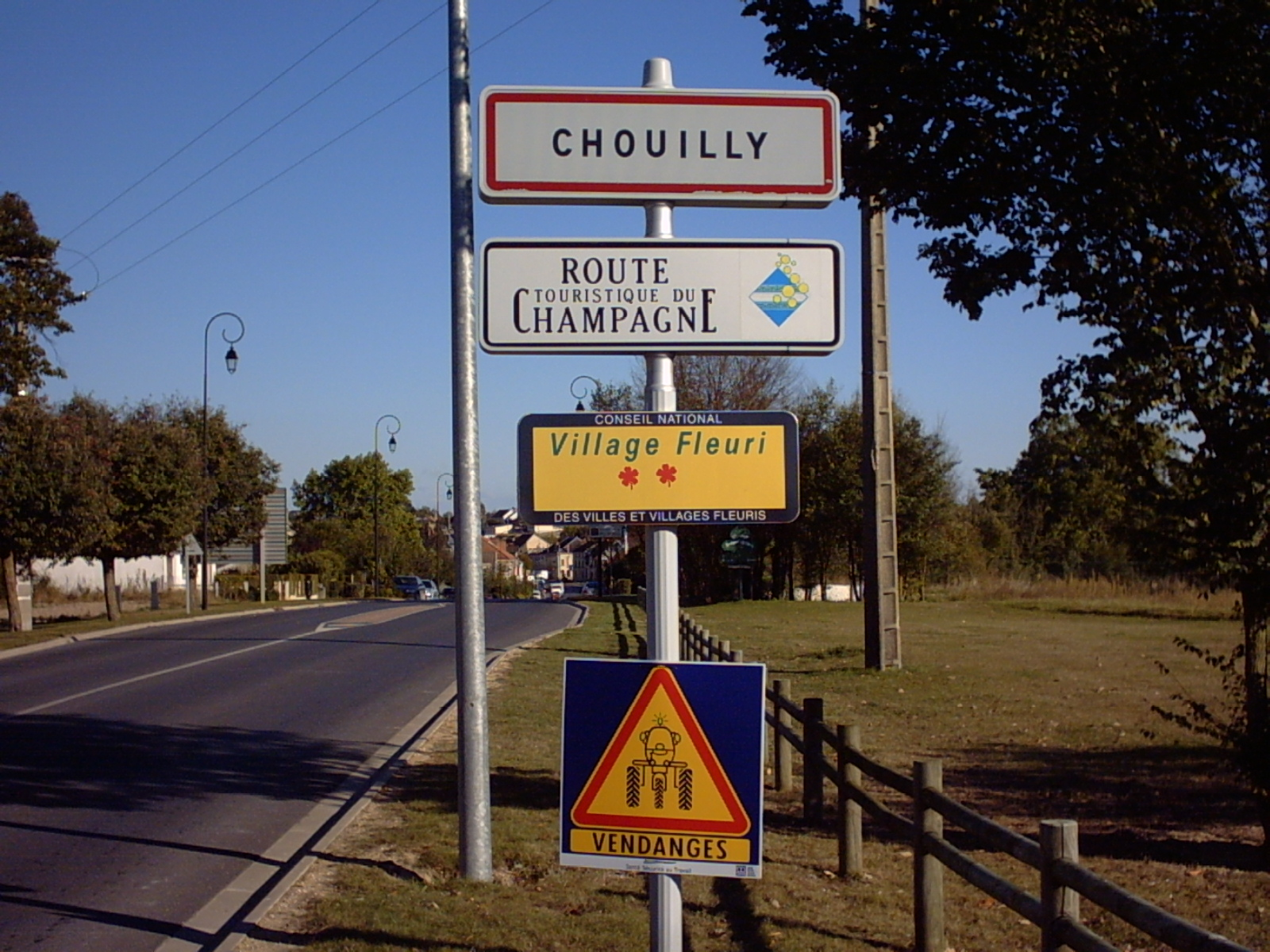
The road entrance to Chouilly.

== See also ==
- Communes of the Marne department
- Classification of Champagne vineyards
