= Cuis =

- Commune
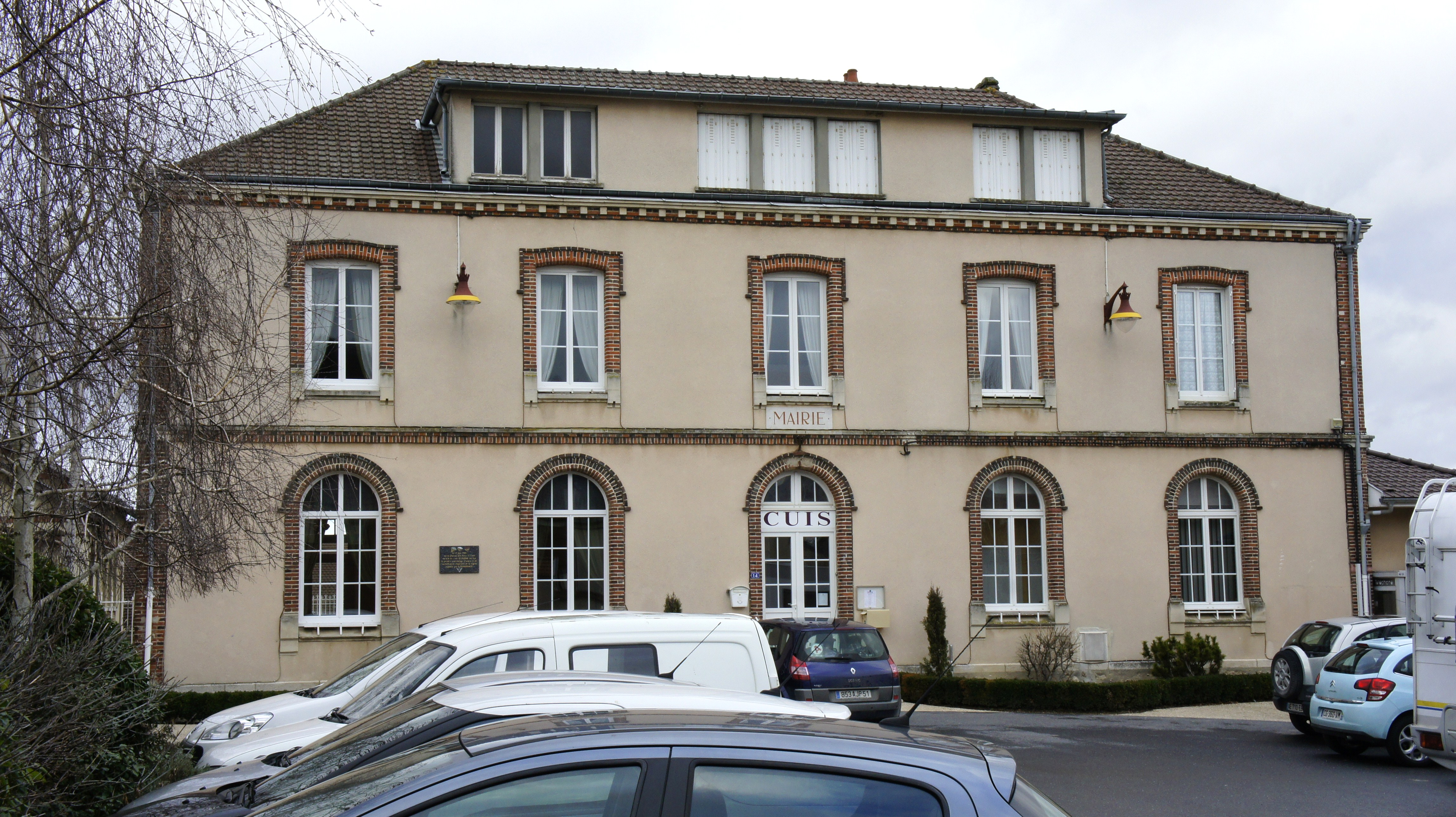
- The town hall in Cuis
- Location of Cuis
- Location within France Location within Grand Est
- Coordinates: 48°59′51″N 3°58′03″E
- Country: France
- Region: Grand Est
- Department: Marne
- Arrondissement: Épernay
- Canton: Épernay-2
- Intercommunality: CA Épernay, Coteaux et Plaine de Champagne

Government
  - Mayor (2020–2026): Patrick Buffry
- Area^{1}: 8.27 km^{2} (3.19 sq mi)
- Elevation: 154 m (505 ft)
- Population (2023): 368
  - Density: 44.5/km^{2} (115/sq mi)
- Time zone: UTC+01:00 (CET)
  - Summer (DST): UTC+02:00 (CEST)
- INSEE/Postal code: 51200 /51530
- ^{1} French Land Register data, which excludes lakes, ponds, glaciers > 1 km^{2} (0.386 sq mi or 247 acres) and river estuaries.

Cuis is a commune in the Marne department in north-eastern France.

== See also ==
- Communes of the Marne department
