= Berti =

Name list

Berti is both an Italian surname and a given name. It is also the German familiar form of Berthold.

Notable people with the name include:

Surname:

- Adam Berti (born 1986), Canadian ice hockey player
- Alfredo Berti (born 1971), Argentine football player and manager
- Antonio Berti (painter) (1830–1912), Italian painter
- Antonio Berti (sculptor) (1904–1990), Italian sculptor and medalist
- Antonio Berti (senator) (1812–1879), Italian politician and senator
- Dehl Berti (1921–1991), Native American actor
- Eduardo Berti (born 1964), Argentine writer
- Elisa De Berti (born 1974), Italian politician
- Enrico Berti (1935–2022), Italian philosopher
- Gasparo Berti (c. 1600 – 1643), Italian physicist and astronomer
- Gianluca Berti (born 1967), Italian football goalkeeper
- Gian Marco Berti (born 1982), Sammarinese sports shooter
- Giorgio Berti (1794–1863), Italian painter
- Giovanni Lorenzo Berti (1696–1766), Italian theologian
- Giovanni Pietro Berti (c. 1590 – 1638), Italian composer and organist
- Gláuber (footballer, born 1983), the nickname of Gláuber Berti (born 1983), Brazilian footballer
- Humberto Calderón Berti (born 1941), Venezuelan geologist, petroleum engineer, diplomat, politician and author
- Joel Berti (born 1971), American actor
- Jon Berti (born 1990), American baseball player
- László Berti (1875–1952), Hungarian fencer
- Maria Luisa Berti (born 1971), Sammarinese politician
- Marina Berti (1924–2002), Italian film actress
- Mario Berti (1881–1960), Italian general during the Spanish Civil War and World War II
- Marisela Berti (1950–2024), Venezuelan actress, singer and television show host
- Nicola Berti (born 1967), Italian football player
- Orietta Berti (born 1943), Italian pop-folk singer
- Pietro Berti (1741–1813), Italian jesuit and professor of rhetoric.
- Ruggero Berti (1909–1985), American cyclist
- Sergio Berti (born 1969), Argentine football player
- Silvia Berti, history professor at the University of Rome La Sapienza
- Simone Berti (born 1985), Italian basketball player
- Tommaso Berti (born 2004), Italian professional footballer
- Tony Berti (born 1972), American football player

Given name:

- Berti Vogts (born 1945), German football player and manager

== Other ==
- Berti people, an ethnic group living in Darfur, Sudan
- Berti language, an extinct language that was spoken by the Berti
- Berti Hills or Tagabo Hills, volcanic field in the region of Darfur in Sudan
- Berti Finno, settlement in Kenya's Mandera County

== See also ==
- Bertie (given name)
- Bertie (nickname)
- Bertie (surname)
- Berty, given name and surname
