= Bertie =

Bertie may refer to:

== People and fictional characters ==
- Bertie (given name), a list of people and fictional characters
- Bertie (nickname), a list of people
- Bertie (surname), a list of people

== Places ==
- Bertie County, North Carolina
- Bertie Township, subsequently amalgamated into Fort Erie, Ontario, Canada

== Other uses ==
- Bertie (TV series), a 2008 miniseries documenting the life of former Taoiseach Bertie Ahern
- Bertie Correctional Institution, Windsor, North Carolina, a state men's prison
- Bertie High School, Windsor, North Carolina
- Bertie Memorial Hospital, Windsor, Bertie County, North Carolina
- "Bertie", a song by Kate Bush from the album Aerial (album)

== See also ==
- Bert (name)
- Berti, a given name and Italian surname
- Bertrand (disambiguation)
- Berty (disambiguation), a given name and surname
