= Berty =

Berty is a given name and surname. Notable people with the name include:

- Berty Albrecht (1893–1943), French Resistance fighter
- Berty Premalal Dissanayake (1954–2013), Sri Lankan politician
- Berty Gunathilake (1924–2022), Sri Lankan actor and comedian
- Berty Heathcock (1903–1990), English footballer
- Berty Seneviratne (1916–1967), Sri Lankan actor and filmmaker
- Louis Berty Ayock (born 1983), Cameroonian footballer
- Adolphe Berty (1818–1867), French historiographer and archaeologist
- Charles Berty (1911–1944), French racing cyclist
- Maurice Berty (1884–1946), French illustrator

== See also ==
- Berti, given name and surname
- Bertie (given name)
- Bertie (nickname)
- Bertie (surname)
