= Yvette Lundy =

French resistance fighter (1916–2019)

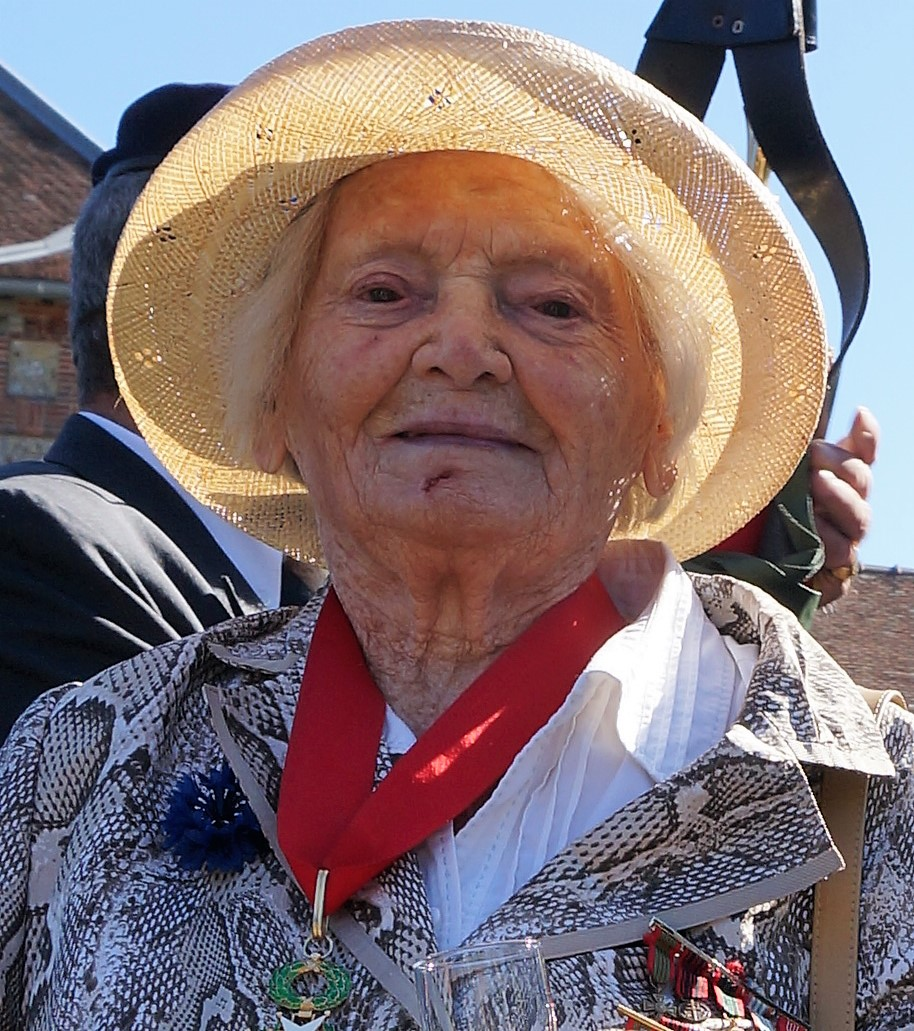
- Lundy in 2014
- Born: 22 April 1916; Oger, France
- Died: 3 November 2019 (aged 103); Epernay, France

Yvette Lundy (22 April 1916 – 3 November 2019) was a French resistance fighter during the French Resistance of World War II. She provided the inspiration for the character of Mademoiselle Lise Lundi in the 2009 film Korkoro, written and directed by Tony Gatlif.

== Early life ==
She was born on 22 April 1916 in Oger, France; she was the youngest of seven siblings in a family of agricultural workers originating from the Reims area. In 1938 she began working as a teacher at Gionges, and as secretary to the mayor there. During May 1940, as the Battle of France began, she fled the area, but returned two months later.

== Wartime activities ==
As a Resistance worker in occupied France, Lundy began supplying forged official documents to escapees from the camp at Bazancourt and to Jewish families. She assisted the Communist Marcel Nautré, and others involved in the Possum network, in avoiding detection by the authorities, as well as providing shelter at her brother Georges' farm for Free French fighters parachuted into the region.

Lundy was arrested on 19 June 1944 in her classroom at Gionges and was interrogated by the Gestapo at Châlons-sur-Marne, where she was subsequently imprisoned. During the interrogation, to protect her brothers and sister (René, Lucien, Georges and Berthe) who were also working for the resistance, she pretended to be an only child. From there she was taken to Romainville, and, on 18 July 1944, was deported, first to Saarbrücken Neue Bremm, and then to the Ravensbrück concentration camp (prisoner number 47360). On 16 November of the same year, she was transferred to the Schlieben subcamp of Buchenwald. Her sister Berthe was also imprisoned in Germany and her elder brother Lucien was interned at Auschwitz concentration camp; they both survived, but her other brother, Georges, did not and was murdered at Auschwitz-Birkenau in 1945.

Yvette Lundy was freed from Schlieben by the Red Army on 20 or 21 April 1945 and, after a march of some 200 kilometres to Halle, was flown back to France, arriving at le Bourget on 8 May 1945.

== Post-war ==
Lundy remained silent about her war experiences until 1959, for her family's sake. After that date, she began going into schools to share her testimony. Her visits proved extremely popular with pupils.

Lundy's memoir Le Fil de l'araignée (ISBN 979-1090911017), co-written with Laurence Barbarot-Boisson, was published in 2012.

At the age of 101, she was awarded the honour of Grand Officier de la Légion d'honneur. She died on 3 November 2019 at Epernay, aged 103.
