= Hathcock =

Hathcock is a surname. Notable people with the surname include:

- Carlos Hathcock (1942–1999), former United States Marine Corps sniper
- Dave Hathcock (born 1943), former American football defensive back
- Jessie Scott Hathcock (1894–1986), American humanitarian, educator, and civil rights leader

== See also ==
- Hatchcock's sign
- Heathcock (disambiguation)
