= Bertie (surname) =

Bertie is a surname. Notable people with the surname include:

- Earl of Lindsey and Duke of Ancaster and Kesteven, titles in the Peerage of England, including a list of titleholders, all of whom bear the surname Bertie
- Albemarle Bertie (disambiguation)
- Andrew Bertie (1929–2008), 78th Prince and Grand Master of the Sovereign Military Order of Malta
- Charles Bertie (disambiguation)
- Diego Bertie (1967–2022), Peruvian actor and singer
- Francis Bertie, 1st Viscount Bertie of Thame (1844–1919), British diplomat
- Henry Bertie (of Weston-on-the-Green) (died 1734), Member of Parliament for Oxford, Westbury, and Woodstock
- Henry Bertie (proprietor) (c. 1675–1735), Lord Proprietor of North Carolina and Member of Parliament for Beaumaris
- Montagu Bertie (disambiguation)
- Peregrine Bertie (disambiguation)
- Philip Bertie (c. 1660–1728), English courtier and politician
- Priscilla Bertie, 21st Baroness Willoughby de Eresby (1761–1828)
- Richard Bertie (courtier) (died 1582), English landowner and religious evangelical
- Robert Bertie (disambiguation)
- Thomas Bertie (1758–1825), Royal Navy admiral
- Willoughby Bertie, 3rd Earl of Abingdon (1692–1760)
- Willoughby Bertie, 4th Earl of Abingdon (1740–1799)
