= Heathcock (disambiguation) =

Heathcock is another name for the partridge, a class of medium-sized non-migratory gamebirds.

Heathcock may also refer to:

== Places ==
- Heathcock Peak located in the eastern part of the Caloplaca Hills in Antarctica

== People ==
- Alan Heathcock (born 1971), American fiction writer
- Berty Heathcock (1903–1990), English footballer
- Clayton Heathcock (born 1936), organic chemist at the University of California, Berkeley
- Colin Heathcock (born 2005), American fencer
- Ronald Jeffrey "Jeff" Heathcock (born 1959), American former Major League Baseball pitcher

== See also ==
- Hathcock
