= Korkoro =

- American DVD cover
- Directed by: Tony Gatlif
- Written by: Tony Gatlif
- Produced by: Tony Gatlif
- Starring: Marc Lavoine; Marie-Josée Croze; James Thiérrée; Rufus
- Cinematography: Julien Hirsch
- Edited by: Monique Dartonne
- Music by: Delphine Mantoulet; Tony Gatlif
- Production companies: Production Princes; France 3 Cinema; Rhone-Alpes Cinema
- Distributed by: UGC Distribution
- Release dates: August 2009 (Montréal Film Festival); 24 February 2010
- Running time: 111 minutes
- Country: France
- Languages: French; Romani

Korkoro ("Alone" in Romani) is a 2009 French drama film written and directed by Tony Gatlif, starring Francophone actors Marc Lavoine, Marie-Josée Croze and James Thiérrée. The film's cast were of many nationalities such as Albanian, Kosovar, Georgian, Serbian, French, Norwegian, and nine Romani people Gatlif recruited in Transylvania.

Based on an anecdote about the Second World War by the Romani historian Jacques Sigot, the film was inspired by a Romani who escaped the Nazis with help from French villagers. It depicts the rarely documented subject of Porajmos (the Romani Holocaust).

Other than a band of Romani people, the film has a character based on Yvette Lundy, a French teacher who was active in the French resistance and deported to a concentration camp for forging passports for Romani.

Gatlif had intended to make a documentary but the lack of supporting documents led him to present it as a drama.

The film premiered at the Montréal World Film Festival, winning the Grand Prize of the Americas, amongst other awards. It was released in France as Liberté in February 2010, where it grossed $601,252; revenues from Belgium and the United States brought the total to $627,088. The film's music, composed by Tony Gatlif and Delphine Mantoulet, received a nomination in the Best Music Written for a Film category at the 36th annual César Awards.

Korkoro has been described as a "rare cinematic tribute" to those killed in the Porajmos. In general, it received positive reviews from critics, including praise for having an unusually leisurely pace for a Holocaust film. Critics regarded it as one of the director's best works, and with Latcho Drom, the "most accessible" of his films. The film is considered to show Romani in a non-stereotypical way, far from their clichéd depictions as musicians.

== Plot ==
The film is set during World War II in rural Vichy France, and begins with a nine-year-old French boy, Claude (Mathias Laliberté) escaping from an orphanage. He decides to avoid state protection. He meets a Romani caravan, an extended family of 20 men, women and children, who decide to adopt him. The Romani start calling Claude, Korkoro, the free one. Fascinated by their nomadic lifestyle, Claude decides to stay with them.

The caravan sets up camp outside a small wine-growing village, hoping to find seasonal work in the vineyards and a place to sell their wares. The village, as was the trend, is divided into two factions—one welcomes the Romani, and the other sees them as an intrusion. Théodore Rosier (Marc Lavoine), the village mayor and veterinarian, and Mademoiselle Lundi (Marie-Josée Croze), a school teacher and clerk in city hall, are two of the friendlier villagers. The Vichy France gendarmerie used the documentation made in the passports of its citizens to monitor their movements for which a threshold was set, along with imprisonment for violations. This adversely affected the Romani. Lundi uses her powers as a clerk and forges their passports, removing the documentation about their movements.

Later, when Rosier has an accident outside the village, he is rescued by the Romani, who treat the mayor with their traditional healing practices. He sells them his father's house in order to protect them from the Fascist policy of imprisoning the homeless. Lundi enrolls the children in her school. The freedom-loving Romani recognize that these French are trying to help but struggle with life in a fixed place and the rules of formal education.

When the Nazis arrive, Rosier and Lundi are revealed to be members of the French Resistance; they are arrested and tortured during interrogation. The Nazis round up the Romani and send them to concentration camps. Claude, cared for by Rosier, chooses to go with the Romani.

== Production ==
=== Background ===
During World War II, the Porajmos was the attempt by Nazi Germany, the Independent State of Croatia, Horthy's Hungary and their allies to exterminate the Romani people of Europe. Under Hitler’s rule, both Romani and Jews were defined as "enemies of the race-based state" by the Nuremberg Laws; the two groups were targeted by similar policies and persecution, culminating in the near annihilation of both populations in Nazi-occupied countries. Estimates of the death toll of Romani people in World War II range from 220,000 to 1,500,000.

Because Eastern European Romani communities were less organised than Jewish communities, Porajmos was not well documented. There also existed a trend to downplay the actual figures, according to Ian Hancock, director of the Program of Romani Studies at the University of Texas at Austin. Tony Gatlif, whose films mostly have Romani people as subjects, had long wanted to make a documentary on this less well-known subject, but the lack of enough documented evidence coupled with the absence of accurate pre-war census figures for the Romani made it difficult.

=== Development ===
Gatlif's quest began in 1970 when he approached Matéo Maximoff, a French writer of Romani ethnicity. The two went to Montreuil to interview the Romani who were initially not very forthcoming discussing the subject of Porajmos. Gatlif was also researching the Justes, the French who attempted to shield the Romani from persecution. Following former French President Jacques Chirac's efforts to honour the Justes, Gatlif came across Yvette Lundy, a former schoolteacher in Gionges, La Marne, who had been deported for forging documents for the Romani. Gatlif also got hold of an anecdote by Jacques Sigot, a historian who has documented the Porajmos, which would later help with the story. The anecdote is about a Romani family saved from being sent to the camp at Montreuil-Bellay by a French lawyer who sold them his home for a single franc. Unable to adjust to a stationary lifestyle, the family took to the streets, which led to their arrest in northern France and eventual incarceration in the Auschwitz concentration camp.

The characters in Korkoro are drawn from Sigot's anecdote. The film traces the Romani familia's life during the war, from their disbelief at being forbidden to travel, their rejection by others when they stay in one place, to their arrest, incarceration, liberation with the help of a local French mayor and a notary, their struggle to live in a non-nomadic way, and then final arrest before being sent to the Death Camps. The character Théodore Rosier is based on the notary in the anecdote. The other Juste character, Lise Lundi, is based on Yvette Lundy and an old teacher of Gatlif's from Belcourt in Algeria who was a communist and an aide with the Front de Libération Nationale (National Liberation Front).

Intended to be a documentary, Korkoro became a drama because of the lack of sufficient supporting documents. Gatlif wrote the initial script in one month; further modifications later followed which made the film's style a narrative by the characters Rosier and Lundi. Gatlif used Lundy's help to write the scenes related to her, to which he added his own experiences with his teacher. The first appearance of the Romani in the film is inspired by the way the nomadic Romani showed up in the middle of nowhere after Gatlif had been working on the characterisation for over a year. Another year was spent in developing Taloche's character.

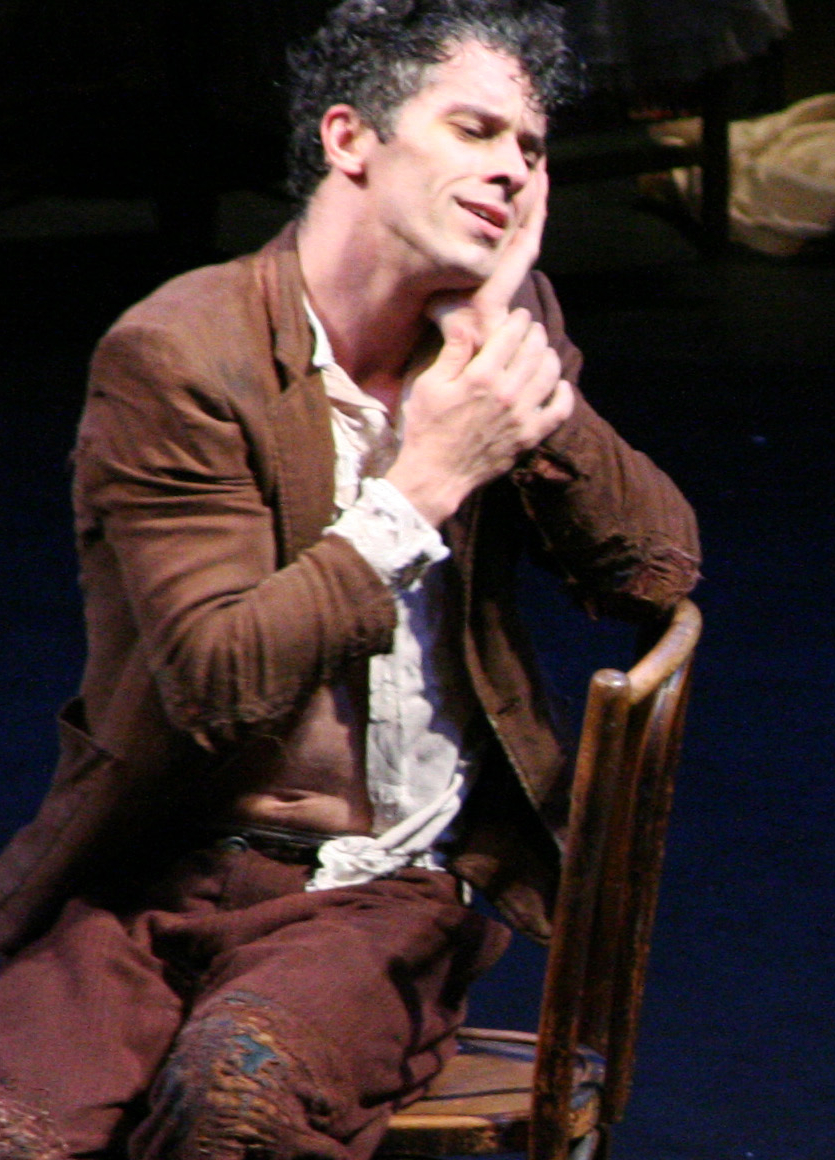
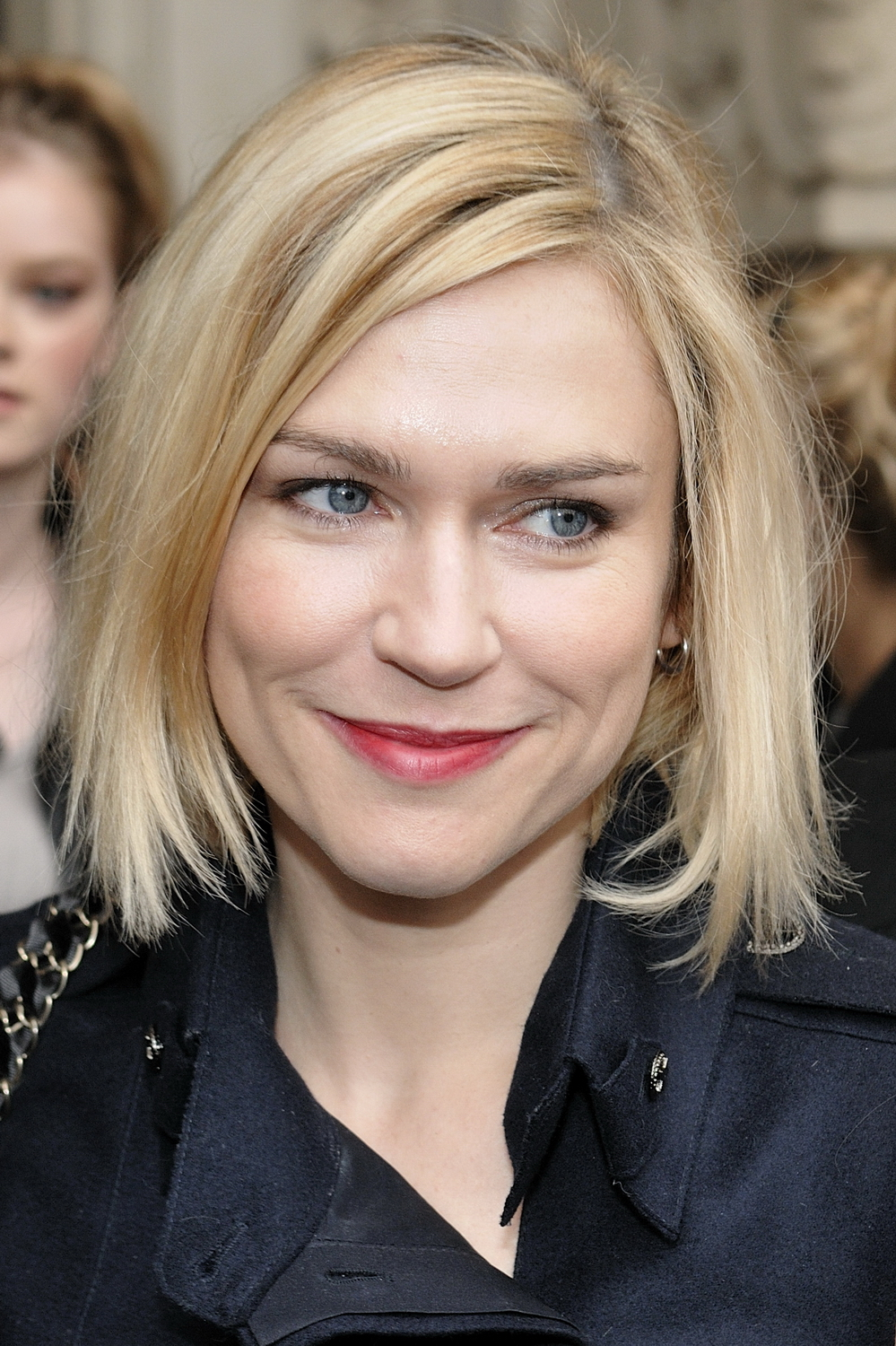
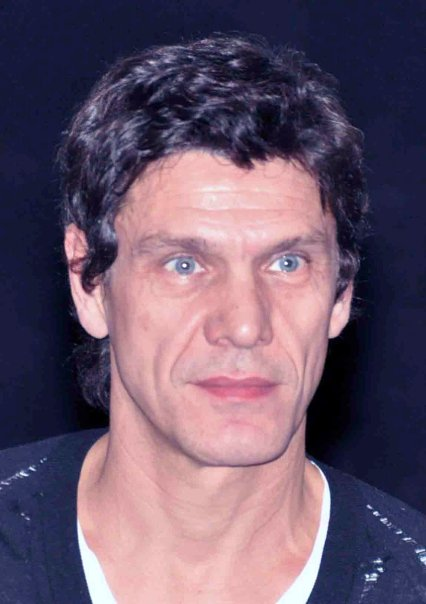
Principal cast : James Thiérrée (top), Marie-Josée Croze(middle) and Marc Lavoine(bottom)

=== Casting ===
Gatlif wanted to represent the entire Romani community in Félix Lavil dit Taloche's naiveté and purity. As an example, Taloche is shown as being afraid of ghosts, echoing the Romani phobia. For Taloche's role, Gatlif needed a musician with acrobatic skills; this proved very hard to find. In Paris at the Théâtre de la Ville, he was impressed by James Thiérrée, a grandson of Charlie Chaplin. A non-Romani, (though Chaplin's grandmother was Romani) Thiérrée learned Romanes and Romani swing music in six months.

For Théodore Rosier, Gatlif wanted someone to emulate a typical Frenchman of the time, with a "voice and face a little like that of Pierre Fresnay, Maurice Ronet, Jacques Charrier or Gérard Philippe", which he found in Marc Lavoine. Marie-Josée Croze was the obvious choice for Mademoiselle Lise Lundi. Gatlif had envisioned Lundi as a "Hitchcock character: fragile, mysterious and strong".

Pierre Pentecôte, the militia character played by Carlo Brandt, was presented with a pitiful look, rather than with a villainous caricature. His drooping hat and a few extra pounds symbolise the fat militia of the period. The orphan, P'tite Claude, was played by Mathias Laliberté. Rufus was chosen by Gatlif for the role of Fernand because of his typical French looks. Puri Dai, the grandmother, was played by Raya Bielenberg, a Soviet-born Norwegian artist and 2005 recipient of Oslo City art award who uses music and dance to make the Romani culture better known in Norway. The other notable characters in the movie, Darko, Kako, Chavo, Zanko and Tatane were played by Arben Bajraktaraj, Georges Babluani, Ilijir Selimoski, Kevyn Diana and Thomas Baumgartner respectively. Levis, a minor character was played by then 11-year-old great-grandson of Django Reinhardt, a virtuoso jazz guitarist and composer of Manouche Romani ethnicity. The cast included people of many nationalities, Albanian, Kosovar, Georgian, Serbian, French and Norwegian along with the nine Romani people Gatlif found living in extreme poverty in Transylvania. Arrangements were made for these Romani to stay in France for the three to four months it took to shoot the film.

=== Filming ===
The film was shot in Loire, in the Forez mountains, Rozier-Côtes-d'Aurec and Saint-Bonnet-le-Château. The tools used in the movie, which were very similar to the ones employed in 1943, came from Transylvania. The barbed wire fences of the concentration camps are genuine ones built by the Nazis in Romania which can be differentiated from the ones used for cattle by their denser spacing.

The male actors were asked to grow their hair and moustaches. The actors also had to diet to lose weight to achieve the look of World War II characters. The costumes had a faded look, a reflection that people of the period owned few clothes, often only two outfits. None of the actors knew the script in advance and were only informed each night before of what they were to do in their daily scenes. The Romani were not aware of the historic events that were the basis of the movie, and were only told that the story was set in hard times comparable to Ceaușescu's tenure in Romania. In the scene where the Romani revolt against the police over the death of Taloche, they were made aware of the character's death only when the scene was being shot, leading to a genuine outpouring of emotions, making their fight with the police appear more real. Gatlif later remarked in an interview that this scene stands for the actual revolt by the Romani in Auschwitz on May 16, 1944.

Thierrée was the only actor allowed to improvise. His characterisation of Taloche was built on spontaneity, and in many instances, Gatlif had no clue how he would act in a scene, such as in the tap scene in which he plunges into a stairwell. In another scene, in which he dances with war music in the background, Thierrée pretended to make love to the earth like an animal. Gatlif, who had wanted the character to have the ability to sense forthcoming danger, like animals often do, stated that Thierrée was suitable for the role because he is very much an animal. The dance scene where Taloche is shown falling from a tree was done without stunt doubles.

=== Music ===
Liberté

Soundtrack album Korkoro by Various
- Released: March 2, 2010
- Genre: Soundtrack
- Length: 50:52
- Language: French
- Label: Universal France
- Producer: Tony Gatlif

Music plays a very important role in all of Gatlif's films, such as Latcho Drom and Gadjo dilo, Scott Tobias noted in his review for NPR. Korkoro is no exception: the importance of music is evident from the opening credits in which barbed wire fences vibrate to the tune of plucked strings of a guitar and a cymbalum in line with the opening lines of the screenplay, "the barbed wire sings in the wind", to the oddest tools used to make music, such as the clanking of buckets and wagon wheels.

The background score was composed by Tony Gatlif and Delphine Mantoulet. The main theme of the songs is the Romani association with France. Despite the sad story, there are cheerful tracks too, with pieces for the waltz, tarantella and java. The film's music plays a prominent role from the opening credits to Catherine Ringer's track in the closing credits, "Les Bohemians", a waltz piece written by Gatlif and Mantoulet, which is described as setting the tone for the film. "Les Bohemians" is the first French song ever featured in a Gatlif movie. Gatlif chose Ringer for the track, inspired by the "blood in the mouth" feel to her voice. The song translates as "Good luck to you all, if anyone worries that we’re gone, tell them we’ve been thrown from the light and the sky, we the lords of this vast universe." The java dance piece composed by Delphine accompanies a scene where the characters secretly congregate in a barn for dancing, signifying the scenario then when public gatherings were prohibited. The track "Un Poulailler A La Bastilles", sung by Gatlif's son Valentin Dahmani, plays on the existing racist stereotype of Romani as chicken thieves. The film also incorporates sound effects of horses, explosions and a watch mechanism. The soundtrack also has a tune of the "Le Temps des cerises", the revolutionary song of the Paris Commune. The music for the song's version in the movie was composed by Gatlif, using clockwork sounds and banjo. Other soundtrack vocalists included Kalman Urszuj, Sandu Ciorba and Ikola.

A soundtrack album was released in February, 2010. It was nominated for the César Award in 2011 in the category Best Music Written for a Film, but lost to Alexandre Desplat's The Ghost Writer. Korkoro's soundtrack is said to invoke mixed feelings like good humour, nostalgia and fear, creating a universe parallel to the film.

== Themes and analysis ==
Kokoro has been compared to Schindler's List, a well-known American Holocaust drama. In his directing style Gatlif juxtaposed the vibrant Romani culture against the backdrop of war. In particular, reviewers commented on the subtle manner in which he dealt with the horrific aspects of war, and the manner in which he portrayed the Romani in a non-stereotypical way. In addition to the Romani characters, the film also has a spy for the French Resistance and a Dickensian orphan. Critics also made comparisons between the state of the Romani in the film, set during World War II, and their circumstances in the present.

=== Holocaust elements ===
Critics compared Korkoro to Steven Spielberg's Schindler's List because of the sacrifices Rosier made to protect the Romani from the Nazis. A review in Moving Pictures Network called it "Schindler's List minus the happy ending", citing a lack of comic relief, creating an inability to connect with the audience. The opening scene, a close-up shot of barbed wire fences stretched along wooden posts with internment camp barracks in the background, is an image common to many Holocaust films, wrote Scott Tobias, who also commented on the "Schindlerian" actions of Rosier who gives his home to the Romani—an assessment backed up by Eric Hynes's review in Time Out, New York. Sophie Benamon at L'Express observed that Gatlif dealt with the horrors of the Holocaust by hinting at them through symbolism, such as portraying an abandoned child, suggesting imprisoned parents, and a clock with Hebrew markings seen lying abandoned in the middle of the railroad tracks, implying the passage of a train taking Jews to a ghetto. Jr Glens Heath, writing forSlant Magazine, remarked that Gatlif's characterisation of the incomplete historic archives with which he was presented made the film a very "personal WWII historiography", where the characters "transcend victimisation" rather than mire themselves in melodrama, regarded as a typical Holocaust movie characteristic. Michael Nordine wrote for Hammer to Nail that this film cannot be compared with Life is Beautiful and other "uplifting tales" with Holocaust themes because of its straightforward portrayal of realistic events.

=== Freedom as a theme ===
A few critics suggested freedom as a theme in light of the importance shown by the characters to it. True to its title, which is a Romani word for freedom, Gatlif used his freedom to direct a tangential, poignant romantic story with the historical documents available to him, unlike other movies with similar themes, remarked Jacques Mandelbaum at Le Monde. The Village Voice review declared that it is "a magnificent paean to the mad ecstasy of freedom". The Arizona Reporter review added that, for the Romani, freedom means "being able to keep in motion, that is, the journey, not the destination, is the reward". It observed the importance the characters give to freedom, citing the scene where Taloche becomes concerned that water is being "held against its will" in the taps, and "releases" it to overflow the sink onto the bathroom floor, and then the stairs, with Taloche blissfully sliding down the stairs as if he were on a Disney ride. Alexis Campion at Le Journal du Dimanche remarked that Gatlif has refreshingly portrayed the Romani as "free-spirited" characters and added that this historic film is a tribute to those free souls who take to the streets even today. The Télérama review was of the opinion that the movie runs out of steam during the scenes depicting historic events, but gains momentum in the forests and on the roads, where its characters' passion for freedom, and hence Lavoine's and Croze's characters, get sidelined by that of Thierrée's, with his St. Vitus' dance and Dostoyevsky-like ruminations. It added that Taloche is the true "incarnation" of freedom.

=== Mirroring the current times ===
A section of critics wrote on the relevance of the movie to the current times. In an interview, Gatlif stated that he wanted the movie to mirror the current times, adding that the times have not changed much, and that while the political extermination has gone, the psychological and political views of Romani have not. He criticised the French law that allows wanderers to stay in one place only for 24 hours. He was also critical of the plight of Romani in Hungary, Romania and Italy. He went on that the state of the Romani now in many places, "with the rows of homeless people waiting for a bowl of soup with a tin can on their hands", is not very different from that in the concentration camps. Gatlif also lashed out against the fact that until 1969, Romani were required to have their papers stamped at a police station or city hall whenever they arrived at or left a French village. Bob Hill at Moving Pictures Network remarked that the movie draws parallels to the fact that "we are once again veering toward a culture in which regimes and wealth determine who has the right to live free — and who has no rights at all", and cited present happenings such as the developments in the Middle East, racial wars and inter-country disputes. It added that the movie makes the audience ask themselves if they live in a society that embraces or condemns diversity.

== Release ==
The film premiered at the 2009 Montreal World Film Festival, contending in the World Competition section, reserved for world and international premieres, for the awards Grand Prize of the Americas, Special Grand Prix of the Jury, Best Director, Best Actress, Best Actor, Best Screenplay, Best Artistic Contribution, and Innovation Award. Alongside the film, Gatlif released a novel under the same name, Liberté, which he co-authored with the French novelist Eric Kannay. The book follows the film's script.

In 2009, it vied with films with historical themes for the Prix du film d’histoire at the Festival international du film d'histoire de Pessac. The 2010 Alliance Française French Film Festival screened it in the Resistance section, with other films dealing with themes of oppression and resistance. Later in 2010 it competed in the official section, reserved for Mediterranean films, for the Eros and Psyche Award and Special Mention/Artistic Expression recognition at the MedFilm Festival. It also participated in the 2011 Providence French Film Festival. Korkoro was screened on the first day of the Santa Barbara Human Rights Film Festival in 2011, along with films on subjects related to human rights ranging from "abortion rights to post–civil-war Sierra Leone and the then ongoing political turmoil in Zimbabwe". In the same year, the Ankara International Film Festival placed it in its masters section, along with the works of other filmmakers such as Werner Herzog, Takeshi Kitano and Ken Loach. The Washington, DC International Film Festival also had a screening of the movie in 2011.

== Reception ==
=== Box office ===
Korkoro was released in France on February 24, 2010, grossing $601,252, and in Belgium on April 28, 2010, grossing $8,252, for an international total of $618,846. Korkoro premiered in North America on March 25, 2011 at New York's Cinema Village, with Lorber Films holding its distribution rights. The film grossed $1,224 over its opening weekend, and ranked 107th at the box office. It made $8,179 in 15 weeks in North American cinemas. This brought the total gross to $627,088.

=== Critical response ===
The film's tone and narrative style received mixed response from the critics. Ronnie Scheib at Variety found it to be filled with excessive pathos, "shuttling between the trite and the sublime", while Odile Tremblay (Le Monde) said in contrary that the film avoided excessive pathos, rendering it funny and tragic at the same time, an observation that was supported by Jacques Mandelbaum at Le Devoir, who wrote that the film mixes humour, sensitivity and drama. Hammer to Nail's review by Michael Nordine asserted that the film is "neither a pity party nor an emotionally manipulative attempt", but a straightforward portrayal of things as they were, citing Gatlif's portrayal of the Romani as "certainly sympathetic, but at no point does it seem overly so." The film provided insufficient analysis on the "anti-roaming laws" and their targeting of the Romani, observed the reviewer, to whom the Nazi and all other anti-Romani characters in the film came across as "one dimensional bigots". Bob Hill (Moving Pictures Network) criticised that the film failed to strike an emotional chord, unlike other movies and books with a similar theme. He conceded it to be an "important, but not a great movie—or even a particularly good one, for that matter." For a casual movie goer, he stated, "'Korkoro' feels like a slow burn, lagging on long after most of the audience has long since called it quits". In defence of the film's incoherent narrative style, Jr Glenn Heath at Slant Magazine explained that Gatlif intended it less as a historical drama and more as evoking the sense of a memory, imbibing the stream of consciousness techniques. Commenting on its tone, he wrote that "Korkoro is a reserved but lasting examination of collectively silent horror". At L'Express, Sophie Benamon declared that with the film's controlled pace, it keeps its viewers breathless and induces emotion. Alexis Campion at Le Journal du Dimanche stated that the film transcends the stereotypes while the reviewer at Arizona Reporter noted that some might consider it to be stereotyping the Romani.

On Gatlif's direction, Odile Tremblay at Le Monde remarked that he had taken a heavy burden in directing a Holocaust movie along with coupling it with the "poetic effervescence" that the Romani are known for. He added that this can be regarded the best among his films. Michael Nordine characterised Gatlif's directorial style as passive and "documentarian", such that it "sometimes verges on emotional distance". "What easily noticeable flourishes he adds tend to be understated", he added. Eric Hynes at TimeOut lauded Gatlif's work in making a celebration of textures and music of the Romani out of a melodramatic story. East County Magazine's negative review summed that Gatlif had too much faith on his audience, "expecting them to take everything at face value".

Taloche with the watch with Hebrew script on its dial, suggesting the passage of trains to internment camps. Horror is handled implicitly.

The film's plotting and characterisation was regarded flimsy by Nick Schager at The Village Voice, who added that the film's "robust emotion and cultural detail" offsets it. National Public Radio review by Scott Tobias stated that the film weds the exotic culture of the Romani to the clichéd themes of a war film with its characterisation as its means. With a "Schindlerian" Theodore Rosier, a Dickensian Claude, a hinted romance between Rosier and Miss Lundi, and the clown-like Taloche, it added, Gatlif has "weaved a tapestry out of the authentic and the chintzy". Sophie Benamon at L'Express declared that the madness of Taloche is the pivotal element of the film. In Taloche's face, Nick Schager perceived that "the film seethes with full-bodied fury and anguish". Arizona Reporter's review lauded "Taloche's manic antics" as "both the comic center of the film and a representation of the tragedy". Ronie Scheib (Variety) admired Taloche's characterisation, commenting on his acrobatic stunts and close-to-nature persona as gelling well with the film's title of "Freedom". Lavoine's and Croze's characters also received a positive mention in the review at L'Express with Sophie Benamon at L'Express calling them "compelling".

Julian Hirsch's cinematography can be regarded as a relief to the eyes from the film's gory Holocaust theme, stated Ronnie Scheib (Variety). Jacques Mandelbaum at Le Devoir added that the beauty of scenes such as the arrival of the Romani in caravans in their first scene and the gentle music is a stark contrast to the harsh themes of concentration camps and extermination. Odile Tremblay (Le Monde) made mention of a number of scenes, including the one where Taloche opens a tap to "free" water, and the scene with an abandoned watch implying the ghettos as the best moments of the film. Nick Schager (The Village Voice) stated that the film scores on its aesthetics in sequences depicting key elements, like the one with trains symbolising the Holocaust, and its detailed depiction of the characters' intimate practices, which bring depth to a rather predictable plot. Brian Lafferty (East County Magazine) criticised Julian Hirsch for making the sequences look dull and gloomy with insufficient lighting. The tap scene received a special mention in L'Express' review too.

On its historical aspects, Alexis Campion (Le Journal du Dimanche) stated that this is the first French film dealing with the Porajmos. Ronnie Scheib (Variety) lauded the film on its exposure of the French gendarmerie's role in the Holocaust, the reviewer added that this is the most "accessible" film of Gatlif after Latcho Drom. A review in the Independent Catholic News said that the film provides one a chance to remember the forgotten aspects of World War II and to learn more about French prejudice and the persecution of the Gypsies.

The movie received its highest rating of three stars from the reviewers at Le Journal du Dimanche and Slant Magazine while Arizona Reporter gave it a B+ as per its grading system.

Korkoro is rated at 75% on Rotten Tomatoes.

=== Awards ===
Year	Award	Category	Credits	Won	Ref.
2009	Montreal World Film Festival	Grand Prix of the Americas	Korkoro	Won	
2009	Montreal World Film Festival	Audience Award, International	Korkoro	Won	
2009	Montreal World Film Festival	Prize of the Ecumenical Jury – Special Mention	Korkoro	Won	
2010	Festival international du film d'histoire de Pessac	Prix du public	Korkoro	Won	
2010	MedFilm Festival	Special Mention	Korkoro	Won	
2010	The Time for Peace Film and Music Awards	Best Picture & Directing	Tony Gatlif	Florian Gallenberger – John Rabe	
2010	The Time for Peace Film and Music Awards	Founders' Choice Picture	Tony Gatlif	Won	
2011	César Awards	Best Music Written for a Film	Tony Gatlif, Delphine Mantoulet	Alexandre Desplat – The Ghost Writer	
