= Bertie (given name) =

Bertie is a given name. (For the nickname, see Bertie (nickname)). The name may refer to:

== Men ==
- Bertie Brownlow (1920–2004), Tasmanian cricket player
- Bertie Childs (1894–1960), British Olympic fencer
- Bertie Cooksley (1894–1980), New Zealand politician of the National Party
- Bertie Corbett (1875–1967), English footballer, cricketer and educator
- Bertie Cunningham, retired Irish Gaelic footballer (Irish name: Ailbhe Mac Cuinneagáin)
- Bertie Elkin (1886–1962), professional footballer
- Bertie Felstead (1894–2001), British First World War soldier and centenarian
- Bertie Fisher (1878–1972), British Army Second World War general
- Bertie Greatheed (1759–1826), English dramatist
- Berty Gunathilake (1949–2022), Sri Lankan Sinhala actor and comedian
- Bertie Kirby (1887–1953), British politician and Labour Member of Parliament
- Bertie Milliner (1911–1975), Australian trade unionist, politician and senator
- Bertie Stevens (1886–1943), English cricketer
- Bertie Óg Murphy (born 1954), retired Irish hurling manager and player (Irish name: Parthalan Óg Ó Murchú)

== Women ==
- Bertie Brandes (born 1990), British writer and screenwriter
- Bertie Ison Martin Conley (1873–1939), American first lady
- Bertie Dickens (1902–1994), American banjo player
- B. Sue Dueitt, American military officer

== Fictional characters ==
- Bertie Wooster, in P. G. Wodehouse's Jeeves novels
- Bertie Pollock ("The World According to Bertie", by Alexander McCall Smith)
- Hubie and Bertie, animated cartoon mouse characters in the Warner Bros. Looney Tunes and Merrie Melodies cartoons
- Bertie, the name given to Berthier in the English dub of the anime Sailor Moon
- Bertie Bassett, a mascot for the Bassett's brand of Liquorice Allsorts
- Bertie Beaver, the forest fire prevention character symbol of the Alberta Forest Service, similar in purpose to Smokey Bear

== See also ==
- Berti, given name and surname
- Berty, given name and surname
