= B. Sue Dueitt =

Retired American military officer (born 1945)

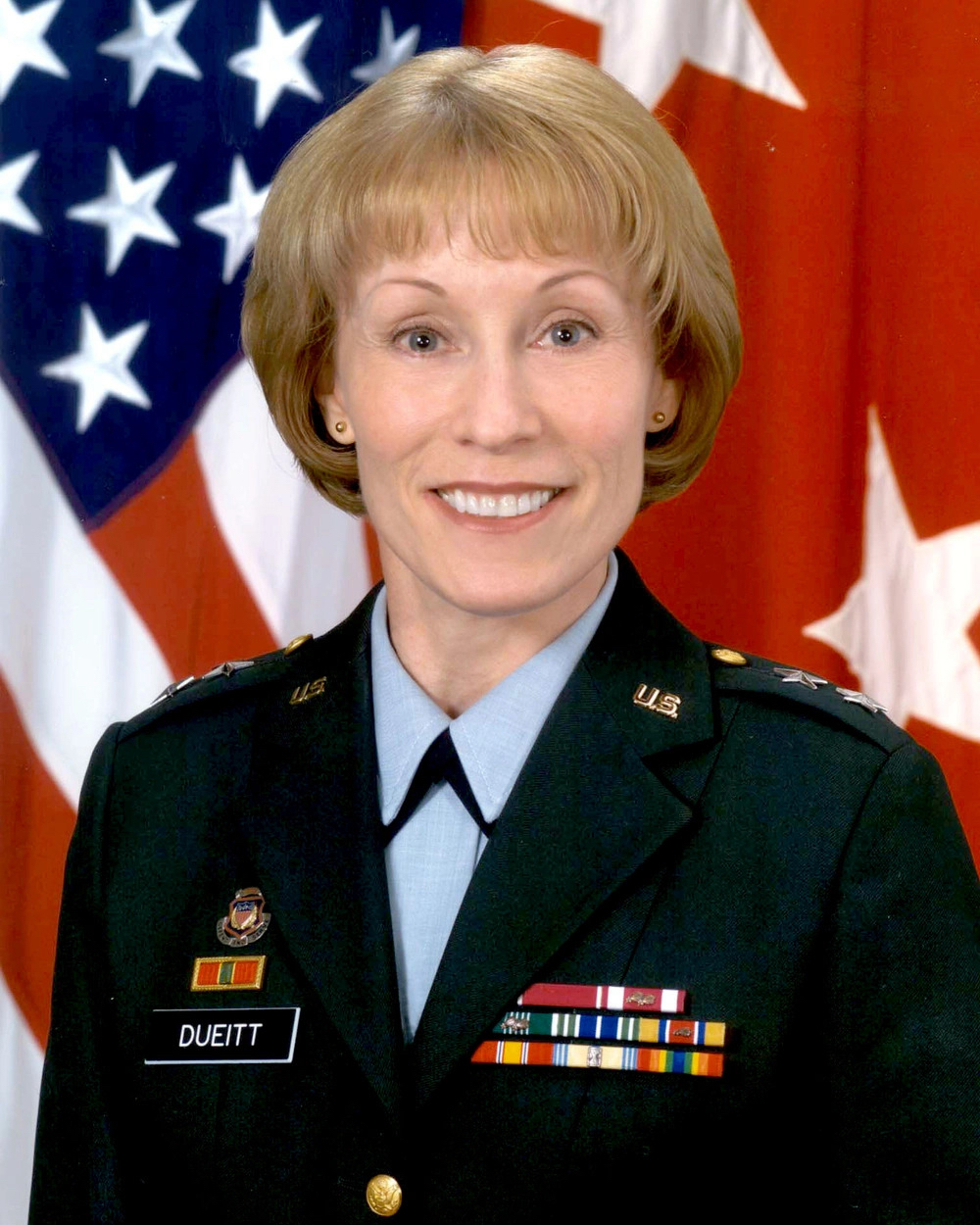
- Official portrait, 2000
- Born: Bertie Sue Dueitt; November 13, 1945 (age 80); Leakesville, Mississippi, U.S.
- Education: University of Southern Mississippi (BS, MS); University of Alabama (PhD); American University (MA); Army War College (MSS)
- Spouse: Thomas Moffett
- Military career
- Branch: United States Army; Army Reserve
- Service years: 1977–2005
- Rank: Major general
- Awards: Legion of Merit; Meritorious Service Medal (3)

Bertie Sue Dueitt (born November 13, 1945) is a retired American military officer. A Leakesville, Mississippi native, she moved to the Washington, D.C. area in 1977 to begin a job at the United States Department of Health, Education, and Welfare; later that year, she joined the United States Army Reserve. In June 1997, she became the first woman in the Army Reserve outside of the Nurse Corps to be promoted to brigadier general.

== Early life and education ==
Dueitt was born on November 13, 1945, in Leakesville, Mississippi and grew up in nearby McLain. She graduated from McLain High School in 1964, after which she attended the University of Southern Mississippi, graduating from the latter institution in three years.

She received a PhD in administration from the University of Alabama and performed other graduate work at American University and the United States Army War College.

== Career ==
Dueitt moved to the Washington, D.C. area in 1977 to work for the United States Department of Health, Education, and Welfare. Soon after, at a dinner, staff members of U.S. Senate Armed Services Committee chair John C. Stennis convinced her to commission as a reserve military officer. By 1997, Dueitt was a colonel in the Army's Adjutant General's Corps and deputy chief of public affairs at Army headquarters in The Pentagon. In June of that year, she was promoted to brigadier general, becoming the first female general officer in the Army Reserve not from the Nurse Corps.

Dueitt retired from the Army in 2005 and works as a consultant.

== See also ==
- Dorothy Pocklington, first woman to be promoted to brigadier general in the Army Reserve
