= Albemarle Bertie =

Albemarle Bertie may refer to:

- Albemarle Bertie (MP) (c. 1668–1742), MP for Lincolnshire 1705–1708, Cockermouth 1708–1710 and Boston 1734–1741
- Albemarle Bertie, 9th Earl of Lindsey (1744–1818), Army officer and MP for Stamford 1801–1909
- Sir Albemarle Bertie, 1st Baronet (1755–1824), British admiral

== See also ==
- Bertie (surname)
