= Blancs-Coteaux =

- Commune
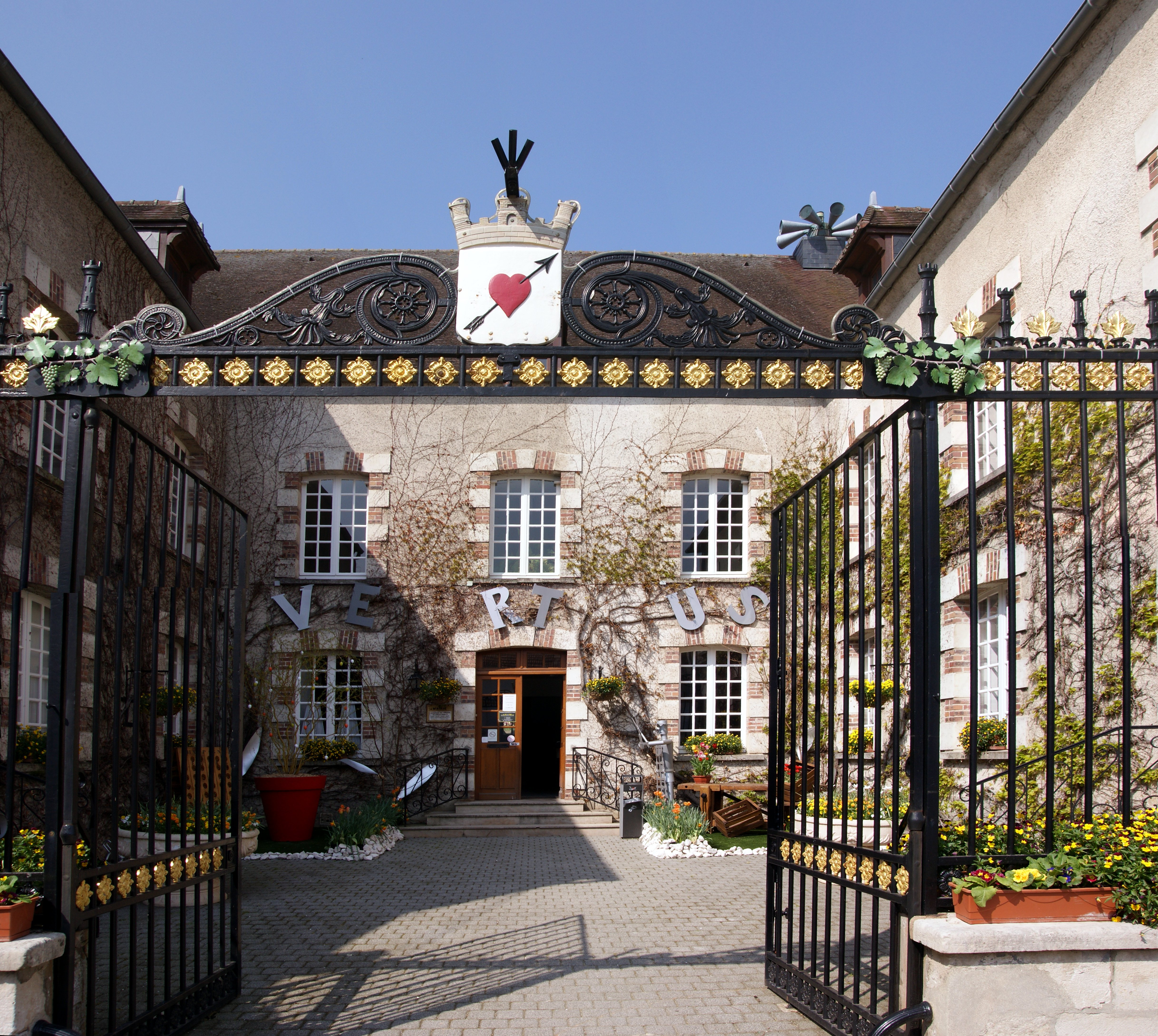
- The town hall in Vertus
- Location of Blancs-Coteaux
- Location within France Location within Grand Est
- Coordinates: 48°54′19″N 4°00′08″E
- Country: France
- Region: Grand Est
- Department: Marne
- Arrondissement: Épernay
- Canton: Vertus-Plaine Champenoise
- Intercommunality: CA Épernay, Coteaux et Plaine de Champagne

Government
  - Mayor (2020–2026): Pascal Perrot
- Area^{1}: 65.81 km^{2} (25.41 sq mi)
- Population (2023): 3,080
  - Density: 46.8/km^{2} (121/sq mi)
- Time zone: UTC+01:00 (CET)
  - Summer (DST): UTC+02:00 (CEST)
- INSEE/Postal code: 51612 /51130, 51190
- ^{1} French Land Register data, which excludes lakes, ponds, glaciers > 1 km^{2} (0.386 sq mi or 247 acres) and river estuaries.

Blancs-Coteaux (French pronunciation: [blɑ̃ kɔto]) is a commune in the department of Marne, northern France. The municipality was established on 1 January 2018 by merger of the former communes of Vertus (the seat), Gionges, Oger and Voipreux.

== Population ==
Population data refer to the area corresponding with the commune as of January 2025.

Historical population
Year	Pop.	±% p.a.
1968	3,575	—
1975	3,743	+0.66%
1982	3,759	+0.06%
1990	3,369	−1.36%
1999	3,381	+0.04%
2007	3,592	+0.76%
2012	3,444	−0.84%
2017	3,325	−0.70%
2023	3,080	−1.27%
Source: INSEE

== See also ==
- Communes of the Marne department
