= Voipreux =

- Part of Blancs-Coteaux
- Location of Voipreux
- Location within France Location within Grand Est
- Coordinates: 48°54′34″N 4°02′28″E
- Country: France
- Region: Grand Est
- Department: Marne
- Arrondissement: Épernay
- Canton: Vertus-Plaine Champenoise
- Commune: Blancs-Coteaux
- Area^{1}: 4.32 km^{2} (1.67 sq mi)
- Elevation: 107 m (351 ft)
- Population (2022): 208
  - Density: 48.1/km^{2} (125/sq mi)
- Time zone: UTC+01:00 (CET)
  - Summer (DST): UTC+02:00 (CEST)
- Postal code: 51130
- ^{1} French Land Register data, which excludes lakes, ponds, glaciers > 1 km^{2} (0.386 sq mi or 247 acres) and river estuaries.

Voipreux (French pronunciation: [vwapʁø]) is a former commune in the Marne department in north-eastern France. On 1 January 2018, it was merged into the new commune of Blancs-Coteaux.

== See also ==
- Communes of the Marne department
