= Bertie (nickname) =

Bertie is a nickname, often a diminutive form (hypocorism) of Albert, Bertram, Bertrand, Herbert, Robert, etc. The nickname may refer to:

== People ==
- Edward VII of the United Kingdom (1841–1910), called "Bertie" by his family; was known as "Albert, Prince of Wales" before becoming King.
- George VI of the United Kingdom (1895–1952), called "Bertie" by his family; was known as "Prince Albert, Duke of York" before becoming King.
- Bertie Ahern (born 1951), Taoiseach of Ireland (1997–2008)
- Bertie Auld (born 1938), Scottish football player and manager of the Lisbon Lions
- Bertie Blackman (born 1982), Australian singer-songwriter
- Bertie Bolton (1893–1964), Indian Army and British Army officer, police officer and cricketer
- Bertie Bowman (1931–2023), American congressional staffer
- Egbert Cadbury (1893–1967), British Royal Navy First World War pilot and businessman
- Bertie Carvel (born 1977), British actor
- Bertie Clarke (1918–1993), West Indian cricketer
- Bertie Coxall (1924–1993), founder of one of the world's first air courier companies
- Bertie Cozic (born 1978), French former footballer
- Bertie Fulton (1906–1979), amateur footballer from Northern Ireland
- Bertie Harragin (1877–1941), West Indian cricketer
- Bertie Higgins (born 1944), American singer-songwriter
- Bertie Higgins (footballer) (born 1945), Scottish footballer
- Bertie Kerr (1896–1973), Irish soccer player
- Bertie King (1912–1981), Jamaican jazz and mento musician
- Bertie Loel (born 1878), Australian rules footballer
- Bertie Marshall (born 1936), pioneer, musician and music instrument maker of the Steel Pan
- Bertie Mee (1918–2001), English football player and manager of Arsenal F.C.
- Bertie Miller (born 1949), former professional footballer
- Bertie Peacock (1928–2004), football player and manager
- Bertie Perkins (1905–1992), English cricketer
- R. M. "Bertie" Smyllie (1893–1954), editor of The Irish Times
- Herbert Sullivan (1868–1928), nephew, heir and biographer of the British composer Arthur Sullivan
- Bertie Troy (1930–2007), Roman Catholic priest and an All-Ireland Hurling Final-winning manager with Cork
- Bertie Wijesinha (1920–2017), Sri Lankan Sinhala cricketer
- Bertie Wright (1871–1960), British actor of the silent era

== Fictional characters ==
- Roberta "Bertie" Songthrush, one of the main characters from the Netflix/Adult Swim adult animated TV series Tuca & Bertie
- Bertie Wooster, principal character in many novels of P. G. Wodehouse
- Herbert "Bertie" Pelham, Marquess of Hexham, one of the main characters in last season and films of Downton Abbey.

== See also ==
- Bertie (surname)
- Bertie (given name)
- Bert (name)
