= Maurice Berty =

French illustrator

Maurice Berty (15 July 1884 – 23 December 1946), pseudonym of Jean Marie Pierre Henri de Lambertye was a French illustrator from Gionges, Marne.

== Biography ==
Henri de Lambertye was born at the Château de la Crolière in Gionges (Marne) on July 15, 1884, to Paul Marie Louis Joseph, a 33-year-old rentier, and Clémentine Marie Madeleine de Liron d'Airoles, who had no profession. He was the youngest of five children: Marie Louise Claire (1878–1914), Roger Marie Joseph Alexandre (1880), Bernard Marie Gustave Gabriel (1882), Guillemette Marie Cécile Henriette (1883–1968).

Henri de Lambertye adopted the Pseudonym Maurice Berty in order to distinguish himself from his grandfather, Léonce Auguste Marie (1810-1877), who was known for his work in horticulture. He fought in World War I and was wounded in the Battle of the Marne in September 1914.

In Paris, he began contributing to various magazines: Fantasy, Lectures pour tous, Bagatelles, but illustration was only a hobby for him, given his financial situation. It was only after World War I and his marriage that illustration became a full-time profession for him. He then began working for publishers of the time, mainly for Nilsson but also for the Nelson Collection. He illustrated the books in the Bibliothèque de Suzette. He also designed advertisements, including for the Le Bon Marché department store, the Établissements Th. Bourdier jewelry store, and for the programs of various theaters.

He also wrote a history book, Louis XIV, King of France 1638-1715 (Paris, Société d'impressions d'art, 1936), which earned him the Bordin Prize from the Académie des Inscriptions et Belles-Lettres in 1942.

Maurice Berty died in Paris on December 23, 1946.
