= Charles Bertie =

Charles Bertie may refer to:

- Charles Bertie (senior) (c. 1640–1711), British diplomat
- Charles Bertie (died 1730) (c. 1678–1730), his son, Member of Parliament for Stamford
- Charles Bertie (1683–1727), Member of Parliament for New Woodstock
- Charles Bertie (professor) (c. 1679–1746/7), Rector of Kenn and Sedleian Professor of Natural Philosophy
