= Silvia Berti =

Italian historian

Silvia Berti is a history professor at the University of Rome La Sapienza. Her fields of interest are the relationship between Jewish and Christian culture in the Moderna era, issues of history of historiography, European anti-Christian attitudes, Spinoza and Spinozism, the Huguenots, Jansenists, the Enlightenment, and other opposition groups within French history.

== Publications ==
Her most prominent published works include her introduction to the volume she also edited, Arnaldo Momigliano's Essays on Ancient and Modern Judaism. She is on the editorial board of Hebraic Political Studies and has published in the Journal of the History of Ideas, the Jewish Studies Quarterly, and Rivista storica italiana. She has been the recipient of fellowships from the Center for Advanced Judaic Studies (Philadelphia) (1999–2000), the Folger Shakespeare Library (1995–96), and the Shelby Cullom Davis Center for Historical Studies at Princeton University (1993–94).
