= Hatchcock's sign =

Clinical sign

- Differential diagnosis: mumps

Hatchcock's sign is a clinical sign in which upward pressure on the angle of the mandible causes pain due to parotitis in mumps, but no pain in adenitis.
