= Robert Bertie =

Robert Bertie may refer to:

- Robert Bertie (of Benham) (1677–1710), Member of Parliament for Westbury
- Robert Bertie, 1st Earl of Lindsey (1583–1642)
- Robert Bertie, 3rd Earl of Lindsey (1641–1701)
- Robert Bertie, 1st Duke of Ancaster and Kesteven (1660–1723)
- Robert Bertie, 4th Duke of Ancaster and Kesteven (1756–1779)
- Lord Robert Bertie (1721–1782), Army general and Member of Parliament
