= Bertie Loel =

Australian rules footballer

Personal information
- Full name: Bertram Benjamin Loel
- Born: 5 November 1878; Carlton, Victoria
- Died: 19 July 1957 (aged 78); Lane Cove, New South Wales
- Original team: Mercantile Rowing Club
- Position: Forward

Playing career^{1}
Years	Club	Games (Goals)
1901–02	Fitzroy	15 (2)
- ^{1} Playing statistics correct to the end of 1902.

Bertram Benjamin Loel (5 November 1878 – 19 July 1957), known as Bertie Loel, was an Australian rules footballer who played with Fitzroy in the Victorian Football League (VFL).

He was the younger brother of Herb Loel who played for Carlton in the Victorian Football Association (VFA) and West Perth in the West Australian Football Association (WAFA).

Loel served in the Boer War, World War I and World War II.
