= Peregrine Bertie =

Peregrine Bertie may refer to:

- Peregrine Bertie, 13th Baron Willoughby de Eresby (1555–1601)
- Peregrine Bertie (MP for Lincolnshire) (born c. 1584), MP for Lincolnshire 1614
- Peregrine Bertie (senior) (c. 1634–1701)
- Peregrine Bertie (died 1711) (c. 1663–1711), Privy Counsellor and politician
- Peregrine Bertie, 2nd Duke of Ancaster and Kesteven (1686–1742)
- Peregrine Bertie, 3rd Duke of Ancaster and Kesteven (1714–1778)
- Peregrine Bertie (of Low Leyton) (c. 1723–1786), MP for Westbury
- Peregrine Bertie (naval officer) (1741–1790), Royal Navy officer and MP for Oxford
