= Berti Finno =

- Location within Kenya
- Coordinates: 3.37°N 41.44°E
- Country: Kenya
- County: Mandera County
- Time zone: UTC+3 (EAT)

Berti Finno is a settlement in Kenya's Mandera County.
