= Bertie Higgins (footballer) =

Scottish footballer (1945–2026)

Personal information
- Full name: Cuthbert Edward Higgins
- Date of birth: 26 January 1945
- Place of birth: Dunoon, Scotland
- Date of death: 1 February 2026 (aged 81)
- Place of death: Burlington, Ontario, Canada
- Position: Outside left

Senior career*
Years	Team	Apps	(Gls)
- Dunoon Athletic
1963	Queen's Park	18	(0)

International career
1963	Scotland Amateurs	2	(1)
- * Club domestic league appearances and goals

Cuthbert Edward Higgins (26 January 1945 – 1 February 2026) was a Scottish amateur footballer who played in the Scottish League for Queen's Park as an outside left. He was capped by Scotland at amateur level.

== Personal life ==
Higgins completed a five-year apprenticeship as a sailmaker in 1966. He emigrated to Canada in 1970 and ran his own sailmaking business in Toronto. Higgins later ran a business making artificial bouquets. He was living in Burlington with Marilyn, his wife of 53 years, at the time of his death in February 2026. The couple had previously lived in Richmond Hill.
