= Bertie Beaver =

Bertie Beaver is the forest fire prevention character symbol of the Alberta Forest Service, similar in purpose to Smokey Bear.

"By the mid-1950s, Eric S. Huestis, Alberta's Forestry Director and Game Commissioner, strongly felt that Alberta should have its own distinct image to deliver fire prevention messages to the public. Walt Disney agreed, and set his staff to work preparing sample images for fire poster designs". He was created by Walt Disney Studios in 1958.
