= Simone Berti =

Italian basketball player (born 1985)

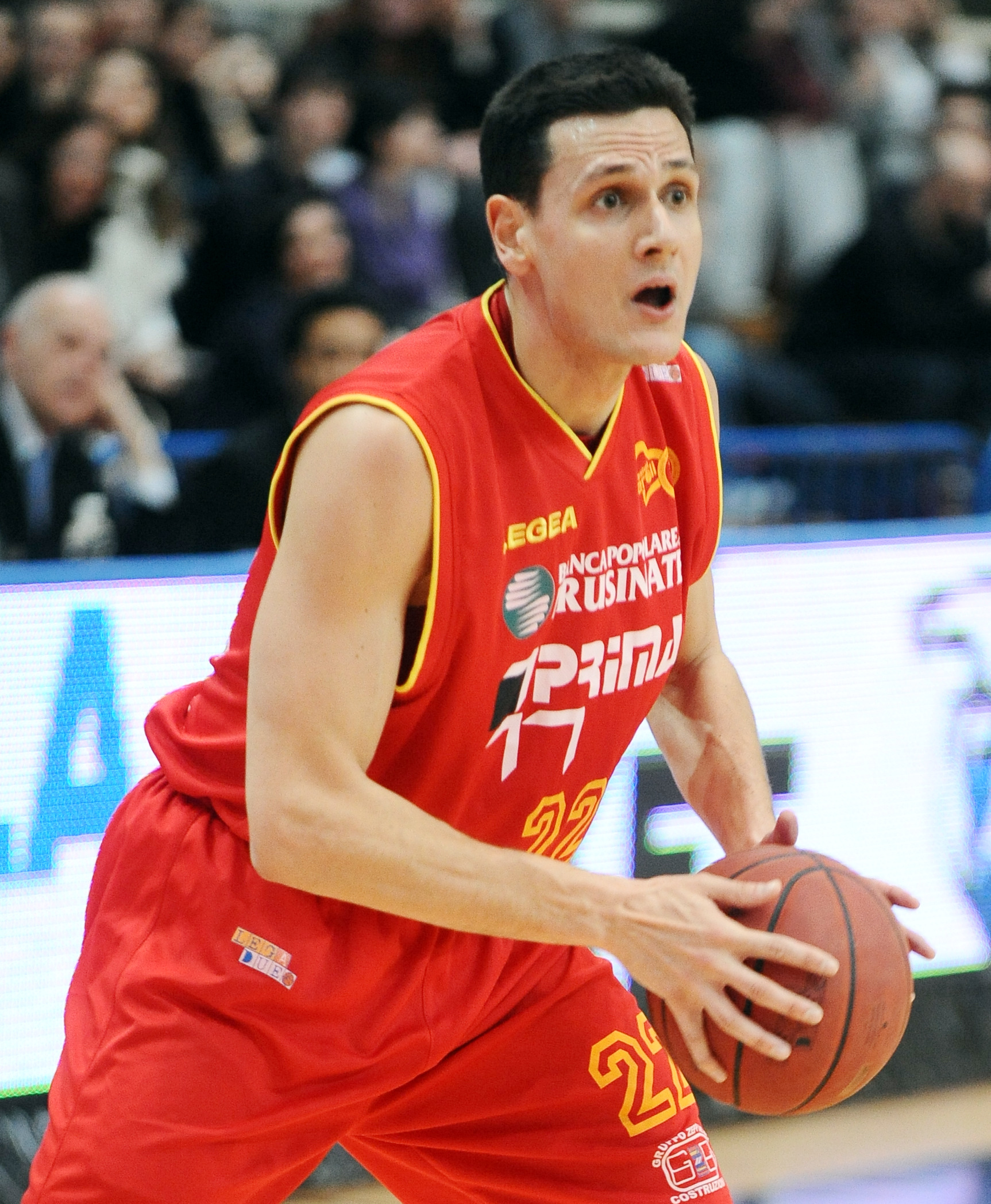

No. 13 – Angelico Biella
- Position: Point guard / shooting guard
- League: Legadue Basket

Personal information
- Born: 13 June 1985 (age 41) Florence, Italy
- Listed height: 1.96 m (6 ft 5 in)
- Listed weight: 93 kg (205 lb)

Career information
- Playing career: 2002–present

Career history
- 2002–2004: Montepaschi Siena
- 2004–2005: → Cecina Basket
- 2005–2006: → Pallacanestro Sant'Antimo
- 2006–2007: → New Basket Brindisi
- 2007–2008: Montepaschi Siena
- 2008–2009: NGC Cantù
- 2009–2011: → Pistoia Basket 2000
- 2011–2012: Novipiù Casale Monferrato
- 2012–2013: Prima Veroli
- 2013–present: Angelico Biella

Simone Berti (born 13 June 1985) is an Italian professional basketball player who plays for Angelico Biella of the Legadue Basket.

== Achievements ==
- Italian League: 1

Montepaschi Siena: 2007–2008

- Italian Supercup: 1

Montepaschi Siena: 2007
