= Oger, Marne =

Oger
- Part of Blancs-Coteaux
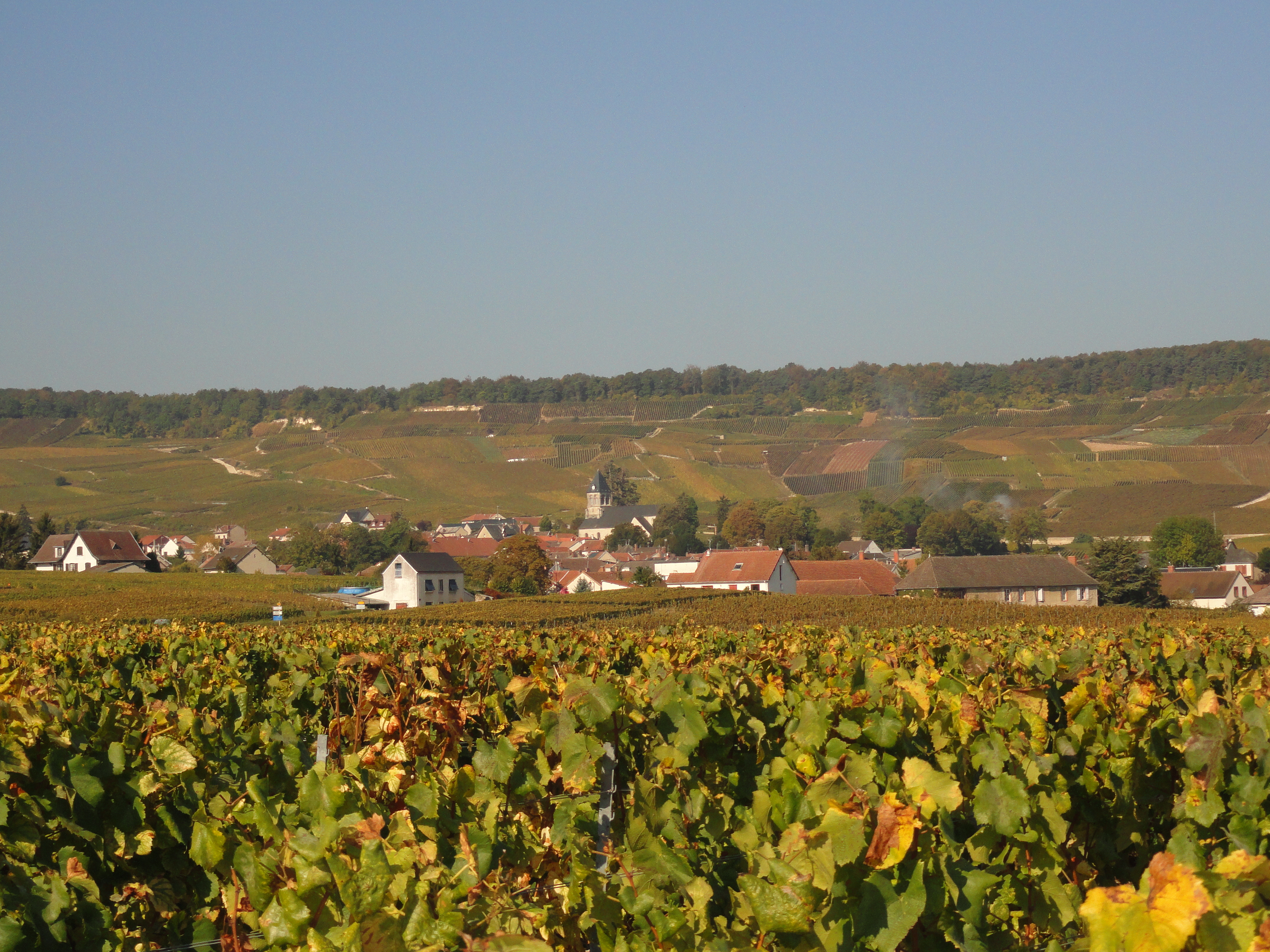

- Coat of arms
- Location of Oger
- Location within France Location within Grand Est
- Coordinates: 48°57′30″N 4°00′47″E
- Country: France
- Region: Grand Est
- Department: Marne
- Arrondissement: Épernay
- Canton: Vertus-Plaine Champenoise
- Commune: Blancs-Coteaux
- Area^{1}: 15.06 km^{2} (5.81 sq mi)
- Elevation: 115 m (377 ft)
- Population (2022): 515
  - Density: 34.2/km^{2} (88.6/sq mi)
- Time zone: UTC+01:00 (CET)
  - Summer (DST): UTC+02:00 (CEST)
- Postal code: 51190
- ^{1} French Land Register data, which excludes lakes, ponds, glaciers > 1 km^{2} (0.386 sq mi or 247 acres) and river estuaries.

Oger (French pronunciation: [ɔʒe]) is a former commune in the Marne department in north-eastern France. On 1 January 2018, it was merged into the new commune of Blancs-Coteaux.

== Champagne ==
The village's vineyards are located in the Côte de Blancs subregion of Champagne, and are classified as Grand Cru (100%) in the Champagne vineyard classification.

== See also ==
- Communes of the Marne department
- Classification of Champagne vineyards
