= Dorothy Pocklington =

American Army general (1934–2024)

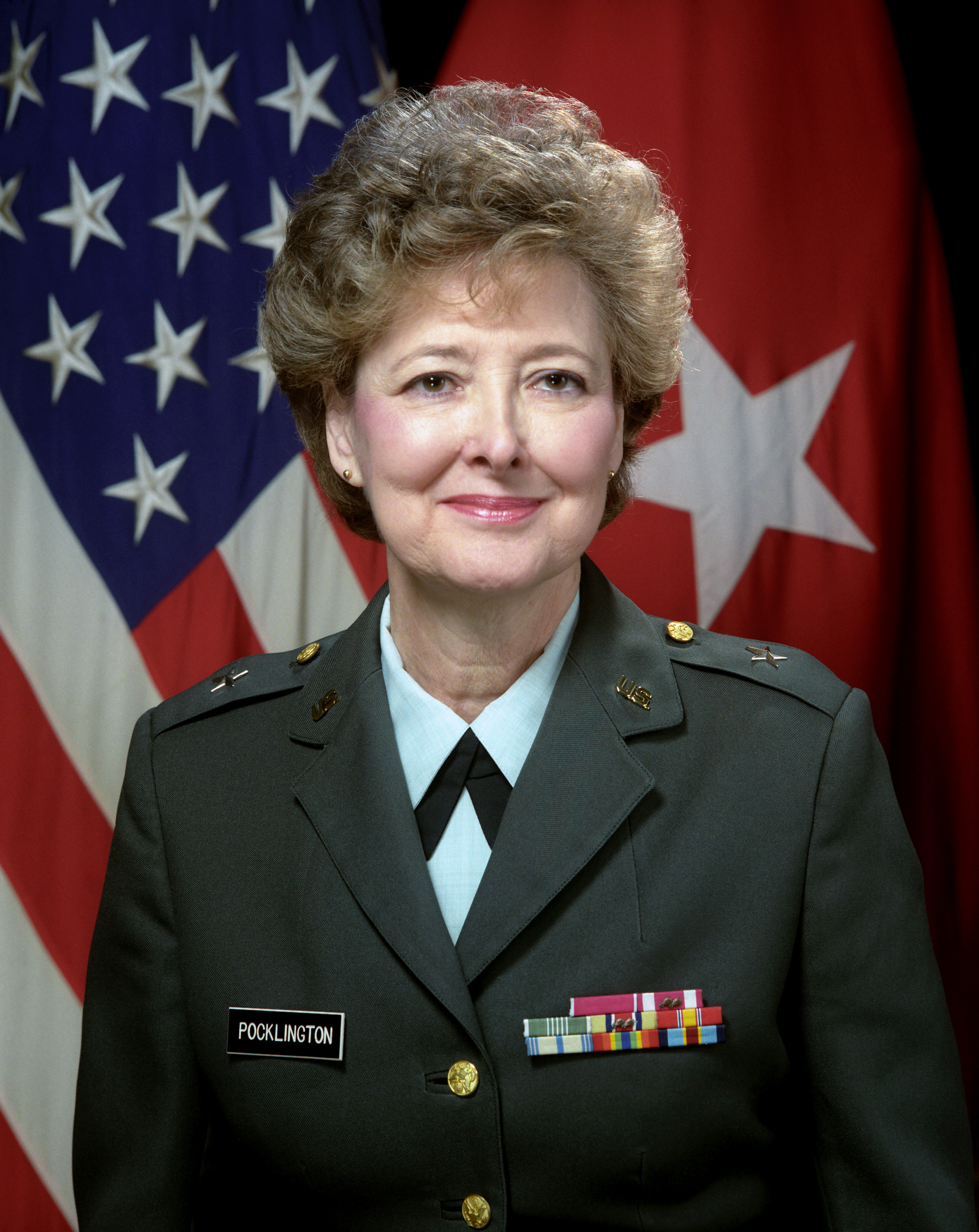
- Born: Dorothy Ann Butcher; 25 March 1934; Louisiana, U.S.
- Died: 3 October 2024 (aged 90)
- Education: Southwestern Louisiana Institute of Liberal and Technical Learning; Catholic University of America; University of Maryland
- Military career
- Allegiance: United States
- Branch: United States Army
- Years of service: 1964–1994
- Rank: Brigadier General
- Awards: Distinguished Service Medal; Legion of Merit

Dorothy Pocklington (born Dorothy Ann Butcher; 25 March 1934 – 3 October 2024) was a United States Army nurse. She was the first female member of the Army Reserve to attain the rank of brigadier general.

== Early life and education ==
Pocklington was born in Louisiana on 25 March 1934, and raised in Lafayette. She earned a B.S. degree in Nursing from the Southwestern Louisiana Institute of Liberal and Technical Learning in 1956. She received an M.S. degree in Nursing from the Catholic University of America in 1960. Pocklington continued to study for a Ph.D. degree at the University of Maryland while also working as a Nursing instructor at her alma mater, which had been renamed the University of Southwestern Louisiana.

== Military career ==
Pocklington joined the Army Nurse Corps in August 1964 and was commissioned as a captain. She served on active duty for thirteen years, attaining the rank of lieutenant colonel. Pocklington transferred to the Army Reserve and continued to serve for another seventeen years, attaining the rank of brigadier general in 1989. As a general officer, she helped to mobilize 20,000 nurses and other Reserve personnel for the Gulf War. Pocklington retired from the Army Reserve in April 1994. She remained an inactive member of the Army Nurse Corps until March 1999.

Her military honors include the Distinguished Service Medal, the Legion of Merit and three awards of the Meritorious Service Medal.

== Personal life ==
Pocklington was the daughter of Curtis Harold Butcher and Lena Cecile (DelaHoussaye) Butcher. She married Alvin Eugene Pocklington on 28 November 1970 in Fort Myer, Virginia. Her husband had enlisted as a seaman in the U.S. Navy, but transferred to the Army and retired from service as a sergeant. He later worked in the field of biomedical electronics. The couple lived in Ellicott City, Maryland. After his death, her husband was interred at Arlington National Cemetery on 1 July 2008.

Pocklington died on 3 October 2024, at the age of 90.
