= Pietro Berti =

Pietro Berti (1741–1813) was an Italian jesuit and professor of rhetoric.

Born in Venice, he entered the Jesuit order and taught rhetoric at Jesuit colleges in Parma and Reggio Emilia. In Reggio, the count Agostino Paradisi sponsored Berti for the Accademia degli Ipochondriaco. He returned to Venice where he was in demand for his erudition and knowledge of precious books. Among his writings are Funeral Oration for the Doge Alvise Giovanni Mocenigo (1779, in Latin). He also wrote Orazione per il solenne ingresso di sua excellenzia Pietro Mocenigo, Cavalieri e Procuratore di San Marco (1780). Esopo (Aesop) vulgarizzato per uno da Siena, testo di lingua (1811). His disciples published a poem posthumously, titled La Pesca di Commacchio, Stanze (1819).
