= Montagu Bertie =

Montagu(e) Bertie may refer to:

- Montagu Bertie, 2nd Earl of Lindsey (1608–1666), English peer
- Montagu Bertie, 5th Earl of Abingdon (1784–1854), English peer
- Montagu Bertie, 6th Earl of Abingdon (1808–1884), English peer and British politician
- Montagu Bertie, 7th Earl of Abingdon (1836–1928), English peer
- Montague Bertie, 11th Earl of Lindsey (1815–1899), English peer
- Montague Bertie, 12th Earl of Lindsey (1861–1938), English peer

== See also ==
- Montagu Venables-Bertie, 2nd Earl of Abingdon (1673–1743), English peer
- Montagu Towneley-Bertie, 13th Earl of Lindsey (1887–1963), English peer
