= Berty Heathcock =

English footballer (1903–1990)

Personal information
- Full name: Joseph Bert Heathcock
- Date of birth: 5 December 1903
- Place of birth: Cradley Heath, England
- Date of death: 1990 (aged 86–87)
- Position: Centre forward

Senior career*
Years	Team	Apps	(Gls)
1922–1923	Cradley Heath		
1923–1926	Leamington Town		
1926–1927	Leicester City	1	(2)
1928–1930	Nottingham Forest	20	(15)
1930–1931	Cradley Heath		
1931–1932	Hereford United		
1932–1933	Nuneaton Town		
1933	Cradley Heath		
1934	Vono Sports		
Total		21	(17)
- * Club domestic league appearances and goals

Joseph Bert Heathcock (5 December 1903 – 1990) was an English footballer who played in the Football League for Leicester City and Nottingham Forest.
